= Results of the 1938 South African general election =

- 18 May 1938

All 150 general roll seats in the House of Assembly 76 seats needed for a majority
- Registered: 1,052,652
- Turnout: 79.36% (▲45.59pp)
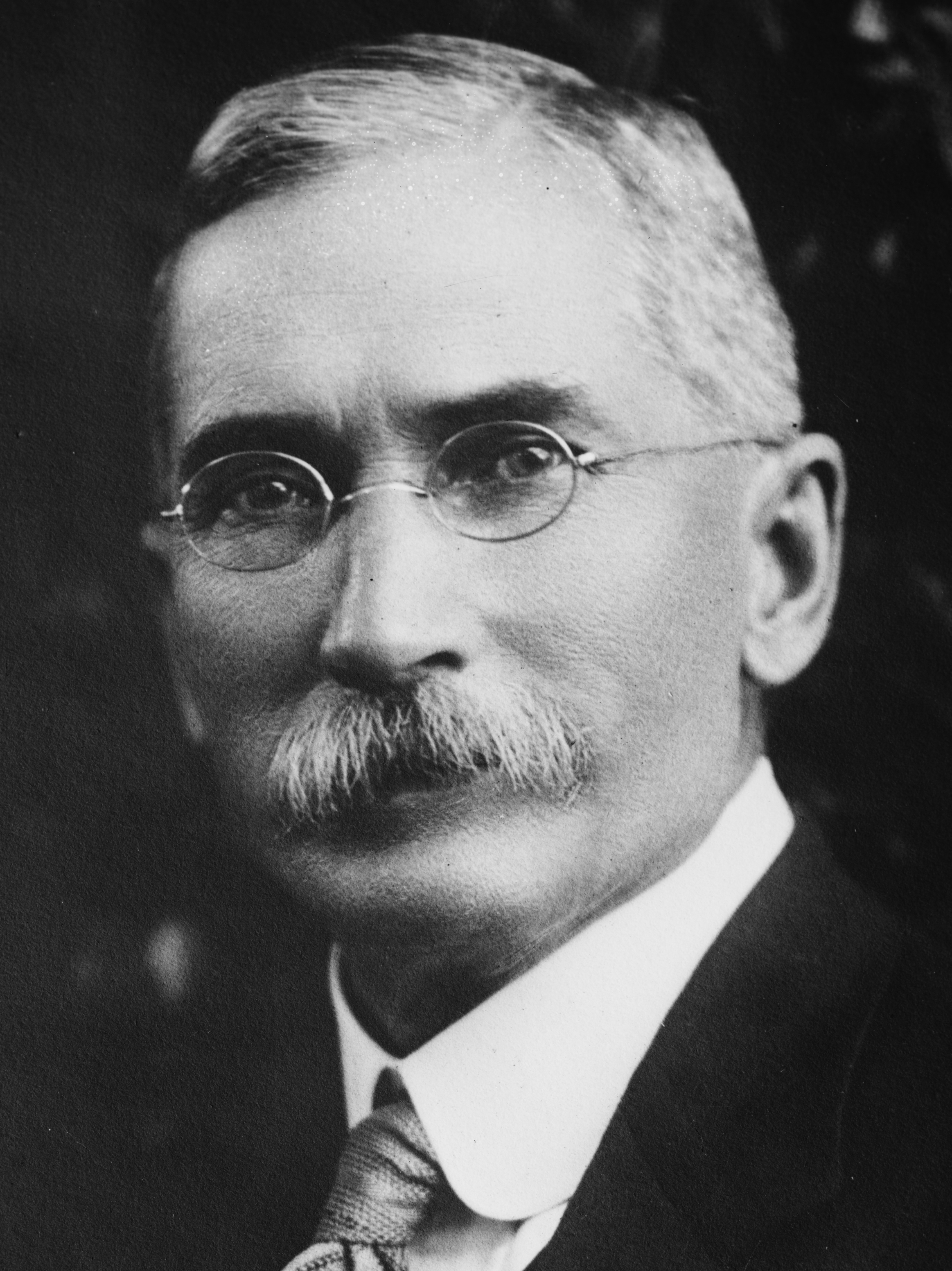

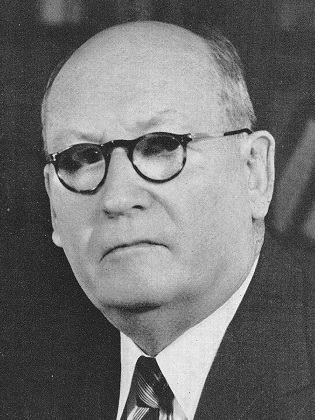

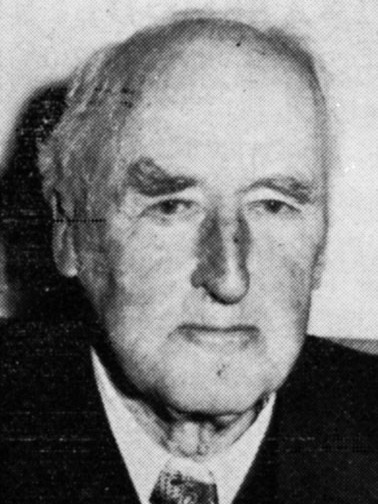

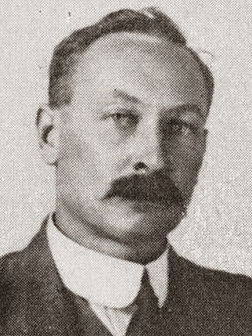
	First party	Second party
Leader	J. B. M. Hertzog	D. F. Malan
Party	United	Purified National
Leader's seat	Smithfield	Piketberg
Last election	53.95%, 136 seats (Note: National Party and South African Party combined.)	Did not exist
Seats won	111	27
Seat change	▼25	New party
Popular vote	446,032	259,543
Percentage	53.81%	31.31%
Swing	▼0.14pp	New party
	Third party	Fourth party
Leader	Charles Stallard	Walter Madeley
Party	Dominion	Labour
Leader's seat	Roodepoort (lost re-election)	Benoni
Last election	Did not exist	6.34%, 2 seats
Seats won	8	3
Seat change	New party	▲1
Popular vote	52,356	48,641
Percentage	6.32%	5.87%
Swing	New party	▼0.47pp
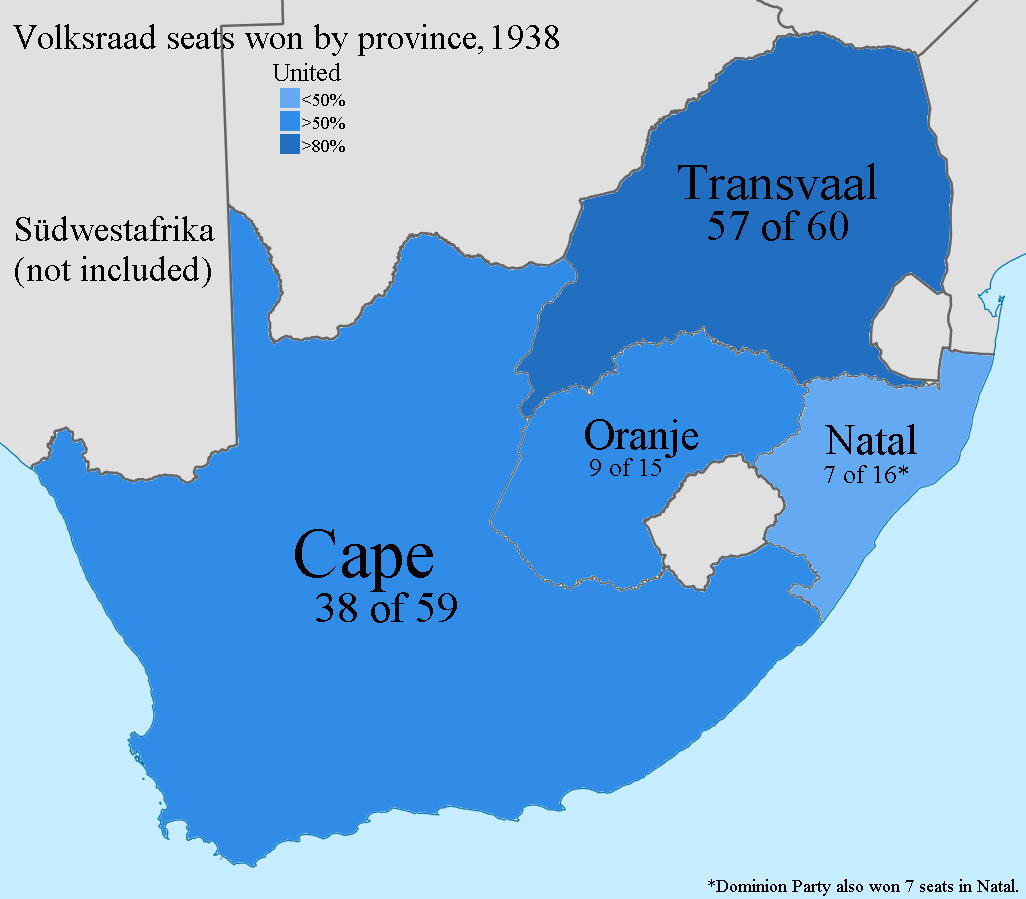
Prime Minister before election
J. B. M. Hertzog
United
Elected Prime Minister
J. B. M. Hertzog
United

This is a list of constituency results for the 1938 South African general election.

== Boundary and franchise changes ==
The Seventh Delimitation Commission (1937) maintained the overall size of the House of Assembly at 150 seats, but changed the apportionment between the four provinces - the Transvaal gained three seats, two from the Cape and one from the Orange Free State, making it the largest provincial delegation for the first time.

Province	Seats 1933	Created	Abolished	Seats 1938
Cape of Good Hope	61	Albert-Colesberg; Cape Flats; Griqualand East; Kimberley District; Port Elizabeth District; Vryburg	Albert; Beaconsfield; Bechuanaland; Bellville; Cathcart; Colesberg; Griqualand; Salt River	59
Natal	16	Durban Berea; Durban North; Pietermaritzburg City; South Coast	Dundee; Durban District; Pietermaritzburg North; Natal Coast	16
Orange Free State	16	Bloemfontein; Bloemfontein District; Smithfield	Bloemfontein North; Bloemfontein South; Smithfield-Rouxville; Wepener	15
Transvaal	57	Germiston North; Germiston South; Johannesburg West; North East Rand; Orange Grove; Pretoria City	Boksburg North; Germiston; Magaliesberg	60

Part of the reason for the Cape's loss of representation was the Representation of Natives Act, 1936, which had removed all black voters from the Cape's electoral roll and assigned them to a separate roll which elected three "Native Representative Members" (NRMs). The NRMs served five-year terms but were elected separately from the general elections - they'd been elected for the first time in June 1937, and sat for most of the 1938-43 Parliament until being replaced in by-elections in late 1942.

== Cape Province ==
Party	Votes	%	Seats
United Party	175,911	52.44	38
Purified National Party	121,591	36.25	20
Dominion Party	19,640	5.86	1
Labour Party	6,259	1.87	0
Socialist Party	2,522	0.75	0
Greyshirts	1,407	0.42	0
Independents	8,091	2.41	0
Total	335,421	100.00	59
Source: Schoeman

Unopposed candidates: UP 4.

=== Albany ===
General election 1938: Albany
Party	Candidate	Votes	%	±%
United	Thomas Bouchier Bowker	Unopposed		
United hold				

=== Albert-Colesberg ===
General election 1938: Albert-Colesberg
Party	Candidate	Votes	%	±%
Purified National	Frederik Hendricus Boltman	2,884	49.3	New
United	H. A. J. Wium	2,850	48.8	New
Labour	J. G. van Buuren	69	1.2	New
Rejected ballots		42	0.7	N/A
Majority		34	0.6	N/A
Turnout		5,845	90.3	N/A
Purified National win (new seat)				

=== Aliwal ===
General election 1938: Aliwal
Party	Candidate	Votes	%	±%
Purified National	Gert Hendrik Frans Strydom	2,996	50.7	New
United	A. M. la Grange	2,858	48.4	N/A
Rejected ballots		55	0.9	N/A
Majority		138	2.3	N/A
Turnout		5,909	91.5	N/A
Purified National gain from United		Swing	N/A	

=== Beaufort West ===
General election 1938: Beaufort West
Party	Candidate	Votes	%	±%
Purified National	Eric Hendrik Louw	3,347	63.5	N/A
United	V. de Villiers	1,873	35.6	New
Rejected ballots		47	0.9	N/A
Majority		1,474	28.0	N/A
Turnout		5,267	84.0	N/A
Purified National hold		Swing	N/A	

=== Bredasdorp ===
General election 1938: Bredasdorp
Party	Candidate	Votes	%	±%
United	Pieter Voltelyn Graham van der Byl	3,950	54.8	N/A
Purified National	M. J. Streicher	3,176	44.0	New
Rejected ballots		85	1.2	N/A
Majority		774	10.7	N/A
Turnout		7,211	92.4	N/A
United hold		Swing	N/A	

=== Caledon ===
General election 1938: Caledon
Party	Candidate	Votes	%	±%
United	Hendrik Christoffel de Wet	3,638	56.2	N/A
Purified National	L. H. Fick	2,793	43.2	New
Rejected ballots		39	0.6	N/A
Majority		845	13.1	N/A
Turnout		6,470	94.2	N/A
United hold		Swing	N/A	

=== Calvinia ===
General election 1938: Calvinia
Party	Candidate	Votes	%	±%
United	Willem Petrus Steenkamp	3,043	50.3	New
Purified National	A. E. Erlank	2,931	48.5	−7.8
Rejected ballots		74	1.2	N/A
Majority		112	1.9	N/A
Turnout		6,048	91.5	+9.3
United gain from Purified National		Swing	N/A	

=== Cape Flats ===
General election 1938: Cape Flats
Party	Candidate	Votes	%	±%
United	Reuben John du Toit	3,289	51.9	New
Greyshirt	W. R. Laubscher	1,407	22.2	New
Labour	J. W. Emmerich	950	15.0	New
Dominion	H. E. Sedgwick	637	10.1	New
Rejected ballots		51	0.7	N/A
Majority		1,882	29.7	N/A
Turnout		6,334	73.6	N/A
United win (new seat)				

=== Cape Town Castle ===
General election 1938: Cape Town Castle
Party	Candidate	Votes	%	±%
United	Morris Alexander	3,456	57.1	N/A
Socialist	H. Snitcher	2,113	34.9	New
Dominion	R. F. Strange	385	6.4	New
Rejected ballots		96	1.6	N/A
Majority		1,343	22.2	N/A
Turnout		6,050	73.9	N/A
United hold		Swing	N/A	

=== Cape Town Central ===
General election 1938: Cape Town Central
Party	Candidate	Votes	%	±%
United	Robert Walter Bowen	4,499	84.4	N/A
Dominion	H. J. Smith	792	14.9	New
Rejected ballots		39	0.7	N/A
Majority		3,707	69.6	N/A
Turnout		5,330	66.3	N/A
United hold		Swing	N/A	

=== Cape Town Gardens ===
General election 1938: Cape Town Gardens
Party	Candidate	Votes	%	±%
United	Basil Kellett Long	4,398	75.4	New
Dominion	C. W. A. Coulter	1,352	23.2	N/A
Rejected ballots		81	1.4	N/A
Majority		3,046	52.2	N/A
Turnout		5,831	70.5	N/A
United gain from Dominion		Swing	N/A	

=== Ceres ===
General election 1938: Ceres
Party	Candidate	Votes	%	±%
Purified National	Johannes Jacobus Marthinus van Zyl	3,082	50.2	New
United	E. M. Krige	3,017	49.1	New
Rejected ballots		45	0.7	-0.3
Majority		65	1.1	N/A
Turnout		6,144	91.5	+23.0
Purified National gain from United		Swing	N/A	

=== Claremont ===
General election 1938: Claremont
Party	Candidate	Votes	%	±%
United	Richard Stuttaford	4,104	66.2	N/A
Dominion	E. M. O. Clough	2,052	33.1	New
Rejected ballots		47	0.7	N/A
Majority		2,052	33.1	N/A
Turnout		6,203	74.1	N/A
United hold		Swing	N/A	

=== Cradock ===
General election 1938: Cradock
Party	Candidate	Votes	%	±%
United	Gerard François Hermanus Bekker	2,933	52.8	New
Purified National	J. F. van G. Bekker	2,536	45.7	N/A
Independent	P. J. J. Coetzee	36	0.6	New
Rejected ballots		48	0.9	N/A
Majority		397	7.1	N/A
Turnout		5,553	86.7	N/A
United gain from Purified National		Swing	N/A	

=== East London City ===
General election 1938: East London City
Party	Candidate	Votes	%	±%
United	John Alexander Bowie	2,558	38.0	−14.2
Dominion	F. E. Dalby	2,381	35.3	New
Labour	P. F. Webb	1,767	26.2	New
Rejected ballots		32	0.5	-0.3
Majority		177	2.6	N/A
Turnout		6,738	79.4	+8.0
United hold		Swing	N/A	

=== East London North ===
General election 1938: East London North
Party	Candidate	Votes	%	±%
Dominion	Richard Morgan Christopher	3,395	50.4	New
United	W. J. Klerck	3,311	49.1	−22.5
Rejected ballots		36	0.5	N/A
Majority		84	1.2	N/A
Turnout		6,742	81.3	N/A
Dominion gain from United		Swing	N/A	

=== Fort Beaufort ===
General election 1938: Fort Beaufort
Party	Candidate	Votes	%	±%
United	Vivian Gordon Fenner Solomon	2,858	60.3	N/A
Dominion	T. J. Farrell	1,832	38.7	New
Rejected ballots		47	1.0	N/A
Majority		1,026	21.7	N/A
Turnout		4,737	75.0	N/A
United hold		Swing	N/A	

=== George ===
General election 1938: George
Party	Candidate	Votes	%	±%
Purified National	Albertus Johannes Werth	3,913	62.0	New
United	J. M. Baker	2,356	37.3	New
Rejected ballots		43	0.7	N/A
Majority		1,557	24.7	N/A
Turnout		6,312	85.5	+17.1
Purified National gain from United		Swing	N/A	

=== Gordonia ===
General election 1938: Gordonia
Party	Candidate	Votes	%	±%
Purified National	Johannes Hendrik Conradie	3,143	55.5	New
United	Adriaan Paulus Johannes Fourie	2,404	42.4	N/A
Independent	N. van der Westhuizen	76	1.3	New
Rejected ballots		48	0.8	N/A
Majority		739	13.0	N/A
Turnout		5,666	88.8	N/A
Purified National gain from United		Swing	N/A	

=== Graaff-Reinet ===
General election 1938: Graaff-Reinet
Party	Candidate	Votes	%	±%
Purified National	Karl Bremer	3,169	56.5	−21.9
United	L. A. F. Slabbert	2,375	42.4	New
Rejected ballots		63	1.1	-0.2
Majority		794	14.2	N/A
Turnout		5,607	86.8	+19.6
Purified National hold		Swing	N/A	

=== Griqualand East ===
General election 1938: Griqualand East
Party	Candidate	Votes	%	±%
United	Louis Desormeaux Gilson	2,969	63.7	+19.6
Independent	J. J. Gray	1,628	34.9	New
Rejected ballots		66	1.4	+-0
Majority		1,341	28.8	N/A
Turnout		4,663	71.5	−5.2
United gain from Independent		Swing	N/A	

=== Hopetown ===
General election 1938: Hopetown
Party	Candidate	Votes	%	±%
United	Pieter Theron	2,912	52.0	N/A
Purified National	D. H. van Zyl	2,634	47.1	New
Rejected ballots		50	0.9	N/A
Majority		278	5.0	N/A
Turnout		5,596	90.8	N/A
United hold		Swing	N/A	

=== Hottentots Holland ===
General election 1938: Hottentots Holland
Party	Candidate	Votes	%	±%
United	Philippus Albertus Brand Faure	3,524	59.4	N/A
Purified National	F. W. Boonzaaier	2,331	39.3	New
Rejected ballots		82	1.3	N/A
Majority		278	20.1	N/A
Turnout		5,937	80.8	N/A
United hold		Swing	N/A	

=== Humansdorp ===
General election 1938: Humansdorp
Party	Candidate	Votes	%	±%
Purified National	Paul Oliver Sauer	3,322	56.5	N/A
United	L. A. F. Slabbert	2,539	43.2	New
Rejected ballots		20	0.3	N/A
Majority		783	13.3	N/A
Turnout		5,881	92.9	N/A
Purified National hold		Swing	N/A	

=== Kimberley City ===
General election 1938: Kimberley City
Party	Candidate	Votes	%	±%
United	William Benbow Humphreys	4,782	70.9	N/A
Purified National	P. J. Olivier	1,866	27.7	New
Rejected ballots		96	1.4	N/A
Majority		2,916	43.2	N/A
Turnout		6,744	79.8	N/A
United hold		Swing	N/A	

=== Kimberley District ===
General election 1938: Kimberley District
Party	Candidate	Votes	%	±%
United	Lourens Jacobus Steytler	3,024	52.0	New
Purified National	J. J. Versluis	2,705	46.5	New
Rejected ballots		88	1.5	N/A
Majority		319	5.5	N/A
Turnout		5,817	86.0	N/A
United win (new seat)				

=== King William's Town ===
General election 1938: King William's Town
Party	Candidate	Votes	%	±%
United	Arthur Capel Valentine Baines	Unopposed		
United hold				

=== Kuruman ===
General election 1938: Kuruman
Party	Candidate	Votes	%	±%
United	Ignatius van Wijk Raubenheimer	2,950	56.2	N/A
Purified National	J. C. C. Minnie	2,236	42.6	New
Rejected ballots		63	1.2	N/A
Majority		319	13.6	N/A
Turnout		5,249	88.6	N/A
United hold		Swing	N/A	

=== Maitland ===
General election 1938: Maitland
Party	Candidate	Votes	%	±%
United	James Wellwood Mushet	3,780	49.1	N/A
Purified National	P. J. H. Hofmeyr	3,427	44.5	New
Labour	W. A. Costello	431	5.6	New
Rejected ballots		66	0.8	N/A
Majority		353	4.6	N/A
Turnout		7,704	82.7	N/A
United hold		Swing	N/A	

=== Malmesbury ===
General election 1938: Malmesbury
Party	Candidate	Votes	%	±%
Purified National	Stephanus Malan Loubser	3,662	52.4	New
United	P. A. Euvrard	3,254	46.6	N/A
Rejected ballots		66	1.0	N/A
Majority		408	5.8	N/A
Turnout		6,982	93.2	N/A
Purified National gain from United		Swing	N/A	

=== Moorreesburg ===
General election 1938: Moorreesburg
Party	Candidate	Votes	%	±%
Purified National	François Christiaan Erasmus	3,545	56.4	−5.0
United	A. A. Melck	2,632	41.9	New
Rejected ballots		108	1.7	+0.9
Majority		408	14.5	N/A
Turnout		6,285	86.1	+10.0
Purified National hold		Swing	N/A	

=== Mossel Bay ===
General election 1938: Mossel Bay
Party	Candidate	Votes	%	±%
Purified National	Petrus Johan van Nierop	3,377	51.6	New
United	J. J. Scholtz	3,114	47.6	−9.9
Rejected ballots		56	0.8	-1.0
Majority		263	4.0	N/A
Turnout		6,547	92.5	+11.8
Purified National gain from United		Swing	N/A	

=== Mowbray ===
General election 1938: Mowbray
Party	Candidate	Votes	%	±%
United	François Allan Joubert	3,909	72.1	N/A
Purified National	J. W. van Zyl	1,461	27.0	New
Rejected ballots		48	0.9	N/A
Majority		2,448	45.2	N/A
Turnout		5,418	68.7	N/A
United hold		Swing	N/A	

=== Namaqualand ===
General election 1938: Namaqualand
Party	Candidate	Votes	%	±%
Purified National	Willem Adriaan Booysen	3,266	54.3	New
United	J. D. J. Scholtz	2,644	43.9	New
Rejected ballots		109	1.8	+0.6
Majority		622	10.3	N/A
Turnout		6,019	88.3	+4.7
Purified National gain from Independent		Swing	N/A	

=== Oudtshoorn ===
General election 1938: Oudtshoorn
Party	Candidate	Votes	%	±%
Purified National	Stephanus Petrus le Roux	3,997	57.5	−0.1
United	A. B. Beyers	2,891	41.6	New
Labour	B. van der Westhuizen	21	0.3	New
Rejected ballots		39	0.6	-0.9
Majority		1,106	15.9	N/A
Turnout		6,948	91.8	+6.2
Purified National hold		Swing	N/A	

=== Paarl ===
General election 1938: Paarl
Party	Candidate	Votes	%	±%
United	Paulus Philippus du Toit	3,991	51.8	−16.6
Purified National	P. J. Hugo	3,654	47.4	New
Rejected ballots		63	0.8	-1.2
Majority		337	4.4	N/A
Turnout		7,708	94.3	+20.5
United hold		Swing	N/A	

=== Piketberg ===
General election 1938: Piketberg
Party	Candidate	Votes	%	±%
Purified National	Daniël François Malan	4,029	66.6	New
United	J. H. Loock	1,971	32.6	New
Rejected ballots		46	0.8	-1.0
Majority		2,058	34.0	N/A
Turnout		6,046	86.1	−2.2
Purified National hold		Swing	N/A	

=== Port Elizabeth Central ===
General election 1938: Port Elizabeth Central
Party	Candidate	Votes	%	±%
United	Alexander Peter John Wares	3,568	59.4	−1.4
Dominion	J. S. Young	2,385	39.7	New
Rejected ballots		56	0.9	+0.2
Majority		1,183	19.7	N/A
Turnout		6,009	70.4	+13.2
United hold		Swing	N/A	

=== Port Elizabeth District ===
General election 1938: Port Elizabeth District
Party	Candidate	Votes	%	±%
United	George Nathaniel Hayward	3,203	49.2	New
Purified National	D. Hay	2,705	41.5	New
Independent	C. A. Retief	573	8.8	New
Rejected ballots		32	0.5	N/A
Majority		498	7.6	N/A
Turnout		6,513	83.4	N/A
United win (new seat)				

=== Port Elizabeth North ===
General election 1938: Port Elizabeth North
Party	Candidate	Votes	%	±%
United	Henry Albert Johnson	3,363	47.6	New
Purified National	F. J. A. Claassen	2,324	32.9	New
Dominion	J. R. Mellor	703	9.9	New
Labour	F. C. Gallant	638	9.0	New
Rejected ballots		40	0.6	N/A
Majority		1,039	14.7	N/A
Turnout		7,068	80.6	N/A
United hold		Swing	N/A	

=== Port Elizabeth South ===
General election 1938: Port Elizabeth South
Party	Candidate	Votes	%	±%
United	John Gauntlett Hirsch	2,963	47.7	−11.7
Dominion	J. R. More	1,787	28.7	New
Independent	S. H. Kemp	1,448	23.3	New
Rejected ballots		18	0.3	-0.6
Majority		1,176	18.9	N/A
Turnout		6,216	75.4	+5.0
United hold		Swing	N/A	

=== Prieska ===
General election 1938: Prieska
Party	Candidate	Votes	%	±%
Purified National	Coenraad Hermanus Geldenhuys	3,042	57.5	N/A
United	M. M. Louw	2,450	41.4	New
Rejected ballots		66	1.1	N/A
Majority		952	16.1	N/A
Turnout		5,918	90.0	N/A
Purified National hold		Swing	N/A	

=== Queenstown ===
General election 1938: Queenstown
Party	Candidate	Votes	%	±%
United	Clifford Meyer van Coller	3,064	51.6	N/A
Purified National	P. H. Malherbe	1,654	27.9	New
Dominion	H. Arnold	1,192	20.1	New
Rejected ballots		24	0.4	N/A
Majority		1,410	23.8	N/A
Turnout		5,934	84.9	N/A
United hold		Swing	N/A	

=== Riversdale ===
General election 1938: Riversdale
Party	Candidate	Votes	%	±%
Purified National	Adriaan Lodewicus Badenhorst	3,589	58.2	−3.6
United	A. L. D. van Wyk	2,520	40.9	New
Rejected ballots		58	0.9	-0.3
Majority		1,069	17.3	N/A
Turnout		6,167	93.5	+18.7
Purified National hold		Swing	N/A	

=== Rondebosch ===
General election 1938: Rondebosch
Party	Candidate	Votes	%	±%
United	Abraham Marais Moll	4,771	78.7	N/A
Dominion	G. B. Kipps	1,259	20.8	New
Rejected ballots		30	0.5	N/A
Majority		3,512	58.0	N/A
Turnout		6,060	71.4	N/A
United hold		Swing	N/A	

=== Sea Point ===
General election 1938: Sea Point
Party	Candidate	Votes	%	±%
United	Gideon Brand van Zyl	4,800	78.2	+28.3
Dominion	G. Parker	1,320	21.5	New
Rejected ballots		19	0.3	N/A
Majority		3,480	56.7	N/A
Turnout		6,139	73.4	N/A
United hold		Swing	N/A	

=== Somerset East ===
General election 1938: Somerset East
Party	Candidate	Votes	%	±%
Purified National	Lodewyk Johannes Vosloo	3,164	54.5	N/A
United	G. H. I Rood	2,597	44.7	New
Rejected ballots		44	0.8	N/A
Majority		567	9.8	N/A
Turnout		5,805	90.0	N/A
Purified National hold		Swing	N/A	

=== South Peninsula ===
General election 1938: South Peninsula
Party	Candidate	Votes	%	±%
United	Sidney Frank Waterson	Unopposed		
United hold				

=== Stellenbosch ===
General election 1938: Stellenbosch
Party	Candidate	Votes	%	±%
United	Henry Allan Fagan	3,734	49.8	New
Purified National	W. B. de Villiers	3,704	49.4	N/A
Rejected ballots		57	0.8	N/A
Majority		30	0.4	N/A
Turnout		7,495	91.3	N/A
United gain from Purified National		Swing	N/A	

=== Swellendam ===
General election 1938: Swellendam
Party	Candidate	Votes	%	±%
Purified National	Sidney Earle Warren	3,681	52.8	New
United	J. H. Coetzee	3,231	46.3	−14.9
Rejected ballots		65	0.9	-0.2
Majority		450	6.4	N/A
Turnout		6,977	91.3	+8.3
Purified National gain from United		Swing	N/A	

=== Tembuland ===
General election 1938: Tembuland
Party	Candidate	Votes	%	±%
United	Alfred Owen Balleine Payn	Unopposed		
United hold				

=== Uitenhage ===
General election 1938: Uitenhage
Party	Candidate	Votes	%	±%
United	Gordon Dolley	3,972	57.8	−9.6
Purified National	H. J. Killian	2,838	41.3	New
Rejected ballots		62	0.9	-0.7
Majority		1,134	16.5	N/A
Turnout		6,872	90.0	+17.2
United hold		Swing	N/A	

=== Victoria West ===
General election 1938: Victoria West
Party	Candidate	Votes	%	±%
United	Daniel Thomas du Plessis Viljoen	3,087	51.6	New
Purified National	P. J. H. Luttig	2,858	47.8	N/A
Rejected ballots		33	0.6	N/A
Majority		229	3.8	N/A
Turnout		5,978	90.9	N/A
United gain from Purified National		Swing	N/A	

=== Vryburg ===
General election 1938: Vryburg
Party	Candidate	Votes	%	±%
United	Petrus Johannes du Plessis	3,205	56.6	New
Purified National	B. J. de Klerk	2,410	42.5	New
Rejected ballots		50	0.9	N/A
Majority		795	14.0	N/A
Turnout		5,665	86.6	N/A
United win (new seat)				

=== Willowmore ===
General election 1938: Willowmore
Party	Candidate	Votes	%	±%
Purified National	Gabriel Pieter Steyn	3,395	61.7	+8.7
United	A. Taute	2,043	37.1	New
Rejected ballots		62	1.2	+0.4
Majority		1,352	24.6	N/A
Turnout		5,500	87.4	+6.0
Purified National hold		Swing	N/A	

=== Wodehouse ===
General election 1938: Wodehouse
Party	Candidate	Votes	%	±%
United	Stephanus Bekker	3,037	50.7	−19.3
Purified National	J. F. van Bekker	2,935	49.0	New
Rejected ballots		20	0.3	-0.9
Majority		102	1.7	N/A
Turnout		5,992	92.4	+20.6
United hold		Swing	N/A	

=== Woodstock ===
General election 1938: Woodstock
Party	Candidate	Votes	%	±%
United	Harry Gordon Lawrence	3,064	55.7	−14.4
Labour	R. Forsyth	2,383	43.3	+15.1
Rejected ballots		54	1.0	-0.7
Majority		681	12.4	−29.5
Turnout		5,501	67.9	+11.2
United hold		Swing	-14.8	

=== Worcester ===
General election 1938: Worcester
Party	Candidate	Votes	%	±%
Purified National	Gideon van Zyl Wolfaard	3,540	50.4	New
United	J. E. J. Krige	3,432	48.9	N/A
Rejected ballots		47	0.7	N/A
Majority		108	1.5	N/A
Turnout		7,019	90.8	N/A
Purified National gain from United		Swing	N/A	

=== Wynberg ===
General election 1938: Wynberg
Party	Candidate	Votes	%	±%
United	Alfred Friedlander	3,152	51.6	+20.3
Independent	J. B. Robinson	2,498	40.9	+1.4
Socialist	J. Copeland	409	6.7	New
Rejected ballots		50	0.8	-0.2
Majority		414	8.2	N/A
Turnout		6,109	76.9	+3.0
United gain from Independent		Swing	+9.5	

== Natal ==
Party	Votes	%	Seats
United Party	35,153	44.97	7
Dominion Party	24,788	31.71	7
Labour Party	7,008	8.97	1
Purified National Party	4,135	5.29	0
Socialist Party	2,441	3.12	1
Greyshirts	1,368	1.75	0
Ind. Labour Party	111	0.14	0
Independents	3,160	4.04	0
Total	78,164	100.00	16
Source: Schoeman

=== Durban Berea ===
General election 1938: Durban Berea
Party	Candidate	Votes	%	±%
Dominion	Edward Cecil Hooper	2,696	49.3	New
United	T. M. Wadley	2,439	44.6	New
Independent	J. T. Oliff	302	5.5	New
Rejected ballots		27	0.6	N/A
Majority		257	4.7	N/A
Turnout		5,464	77.7	N/A
Dominion win (new seat)				

=== Durban Greyville ===
General election 1938: Durban Greyville
Party	Candidate	Votes	%	±%
Dominion	John George Derbyshire	2,530	45.7	+0.2
Labour	A. T. Wanless	1,902	34.4	New
United	L. J. A. Coughlan	1,052	19.0	−17.5
Independent	J. S. D. Helps	9	0.2	New
Rejected ballots		38	0.7	+0.3
Majority		628	11.4	N/A
Turnout		5,531	77.0	+11.6
Dominion hold		Swing	N/A	

=== Durban North ===
General election 1938: Durban North
Party	Candidate	Votes	%	±%
Labour	Cecil Frank Miles-Cadman	3,509	64.6	New
United	A. H. J. Eaton	1,892	34.8	New
Rejected ballots		34	0.6	N/A
Majority		1,617	29.8	N/A
Turnout		5,435	83.0	N/A
Labour win (new seat)				

=== Durban Point ===
General election 1938: Durban Point
Party	Candidate	Votes	%	±%
Dominion	Vernon Lyall Shearer	3,201	55.0	New
United	O. Shearer	2,072	35.6	−28.0
Labour	J. J. de Smidt	397	6.8	New
Independent	R. S. Webb	75	1.3	New
Independent	P. H. Tomlinson	47	0.8	New
Rejected ballots		27	0.5	N/A
Majority		1,129	19.4	N/A
Turnout		5,819	73.5	+19.9
Dominion gain from United		Swing	N/A	

=== Durban Stamford Hill ===
General election 1938: Durban Stamford Hill
Party	Candidate	Votes	%	±%
Dominion	Frank Horace Acutt	3,004	51.3	New
United	Leif Egeland	2,703	46.1	−19.3
Labour	H. H. S. Dold	111	1.9	N/A
Rejected ballots		43	0.7	+0.2
Majority		301	5.1	N/A
Turnout		5,861	80.4	+17.4
Dominion gain from United		Swing	N/A	

=== Durban Umbilo ===
General election 1938: Durban Umbilo
Party	Candidate	Votes	%	±%
Socialist	Duncan Campbell Burnside	2,441	44.0	New
Dominion	C. F. Johnstone	2,219	40.0	New
United	A. H. Mitchell	761	13.7	−17.6
Independent	R. MacKensie	96	1.7	New
Rejected ballots		32	0.6	-0.1
Majority		222	4.0	N/A
Turnout		5,549	76.0	+5.6
Socialist Party gain from Labour		Swing	N/A	

=== Durban Umlazi ===
General election 1938: Durban Umlazi
Party	Candidate	Votes	%	±%
Dominion	Abraham Goldberg	2,447	45.8	New
United	J. C. de Wet	1,676	31.4	−15.7
Labour	S. S. Sutton	1,200	22.5	−29.8
Rejected ballots		20	0.3	-0.3
Majority		771	14.4	N/A
Turnout		5,343	81.4	+7.7
Dominion gain from Labour		Swing	N/A	

=== Illovo ===
General election 1938: Illovo
Party	Candidate	Votes	%	±%
Dominion	John Sydney Marwick	2,576	59.5	N/A
United	W. E. Thrash	1,724	39.8	New
Rejected ballots		30	0.7	N/A
Majority		852	19.7	N/A
Turnout		4,330	80.5	N/A
Dominion hold		Swing	N/A	

=== Klip River ===
General election 1938: Klip River
Party	Candidate	Votes	%	±%
United	George Alfred Friend	1,997	45.6	−21.5
Independent	J. W. Sinclair	1,360	31.0	New
Purified National	J. A. Beneke	1,012	23.1	New
Rejected ballots		15	0.3	-1.5
Majority		637	14.5	N/A
Turnout		4,384	81.7	+18.4
United hold		Swing	N/A	

=== Newcastle ===
General election 1938: Newcastle
Party	Candidate	Votes	%	±%
United	Overbeek Radyn Nel	2,936	61.3	N/A
Purified National	C. A. Pienaar	1,799	37.5	New
Rejected ballots		58	1.2	N/A
Majority		1,137	23.7	N/A
Turnout		4,793	80.7	N/A
United hold		Swing	N/A	

=== Pietermaritzburg City ===
General election 1938: Pietermaritzburg City
Party	Candidate	Votes	%	±%
United	William Arthur Deane	2,848	61.5	New
Independent	R. Dunlop	1,721	37.2	New
Rejected ballots		59	1.3	N/A
Majority		1,127	24.4	N/A
Turnout		4,628	70.8	N/A
United win (new seat)				

=== Pietermaritzburg District ===
General election 1938: Pietermaritzburg District
Party	Candidate	Votes	%	±%
United	Francis Napier Broome	2,755	59.7	+6.6
Dominion	C. G. Leftwich	1,839	39.9	New
Rejected ballots		17	0.4	-0.1
Majority		916	19.9	N/A
Turnout		4,611	79.2	+7.4
United hold		Swing	N/A	

=== South Coast ===
General election 1938: South Coast
Party	Candidate	Votes	%	±%
Dominion	Charles Neate	2,460	53.0	New
United	Douglas Edgar Mitchell	2,158	46.5	New
Rejected ballots		27	0.5	N/A
Majority		302	6.5	N/A
Turnout		4,645	79.6	N/A
Dominion win (new seat)				

=== Vryheid ===
General election 1938: Vryheid
Party	Candidate	Votes	%	±%
United	Ernest George Jansen	2,658	59.9	−11.4
Purified National	D. P. du Toit	1,324	29.9	New
Greyshirt	T. Stofberg	418	9.4	New
Rejected ballots		35	0.8	+-0
Majority		1,334	30.0	N/A
Turnout		4,435	86.6	+10.4
United hold		Swing	N/A	

=== Weenen ===
General election 1938: Weenen
Party	Candidate	Votes	%	±%
United	Harold Abrahamson	2,949	75.0	N/A
Greyshirt	C. L. S. Cherry	950	24.1	New
Rejected ballots		35	0.9	N/A
Majority		1,999	50.8	N/A
Turnout		3,934	76.3	N/A
United hold		Swing	N/A	

=== Zululand ===
General election 1938: Zululand
Party	Candidate	Votes	%	±%
United	George Heaton Nicholls	2,533	58.1	N/A
Dominion	F. H. Palairet	1,816	41.6	New
Rejected ballots		14	0.3	N/A
Majority		717	16.4	N/A
Turnout		4,363	81.7	N/A
United hold		Swing	N/A	

== Orange Free State ==
Party	Votes	%	Seats
United Party	51,148	52.25	9
Purified National Party	46,231	47.22	6
Labour Party	68	0.07	0
Independents	453	0.46	0
Total	97,900	100.00	15
Source: Schoeman

=== Bethlehem ===
General election 1938: Bethlehem
Party	Candidate	Votes	%	±%
Purified National	Roelof Abraham Theodorus van der Merwe	3,305	51.2	N/A
United	F. T. Edeling	3,082	47.8	New
Rejected ballots		65	1.0	N/A
Majority		223	3.5	N/A
Turnout		6,452	90.7	N/A
Purified National hold		Swing	N/A	

=== Bloemfontein City ===
General election 1938: Bloemfontein City
Party	Candidate	Votes	%	±%
United	Colin Fraser Steyn	4,618	63.3	New
Purified National	P. J. C. du Plessis	2,132	29.2	New
Independent	Fred Shaw	453	6.2	New
Rejected ballots		93	2.3	N/A
Majority		2,486	34.1	N/A
Turnout		7,296	81.1	N/A
United win (new seat)				

=== Bloemfontein District ===
General election 1938: Bloemfontein District
Party	Candidate	Votes	%	±%
Purified National	Jan Jacobus Haywood	3,772	54.5	New
United	W. C. Easby	3,046	44.0	New
Labour	J. A. Olivier	68	1.0	New
Rejected ballots		30	0.5	N/A
Majority		726	10.5	N/A
Turnout		6,916	82.0	N/A
Purified National win (new seat)				

=== Boshof ===
General election 1938: Boshof
Party	Candidate	Votes	%	±%
Purified National	Jan Jonathan Serfontein	3,169	51.1	New
United	J. J. van Rensburg	3,002	48.4	N/A
Rejected ballots		36	0.5	N/A
Majority		167	2.7	N/A
Turnout		6,207	93.9	N/A
Purified National gain from United		Swing	N/A	

=== Fauresmith ===
General election 1938: Fauresmith
Party	Candidate	Votes	%	±%
United	Nicolaas Christiaan Havenga	3,328	52.2	N/A
Purified National	Fredrik William Beyers	2,997	47.0	New
Rejected ballots		51	0.8	N/A
Majority		331	5.2	N/A
Turnout		6,376	94.6	N/A
United hold		Swing	N/A	

=== Frankfort ===
General election 1938: Frankfort
Party	Candidate	Votes	%	±%
United	Hermanus Nicolaas Wilhelmus Botha	3,333	55.6	N/A
Purified National	J. L. Uys	2,621	43.7	New
Rejected ballots		44	0.7	N/A
Majority		712	11.9	N/A
Turnout		5,998	83.0	N/A
United hold		Swing	N/A	

=== Harrismith ===
General election 1938: Harrismith
Party	Candidate	Votes	%	±%
Purified National	Esaias Renier Strauss	3,376	51.6	New
United	D. J. de Jager	3,117	47.6	−18.9
Rejected ballots		52	0.8	+0.2
Majority		259	4.0	N/A
Turnout		6,545	91.6	+37.7
Purified National gain from United		Swing	N/A	

=== Heilbron ===
General election 1938: Heilbron
Party	Candidate	Votes	%	±%
United	Johan Louis Venter Liebenberg	3,416	51.2	N/A
Purified National	J. G. F. van der Merwe	3,183	47.7	New
Rejected ballots		73	1.1	N/A
Majority		233	3.5	N/A
Turnout		6,672	93.6	N/A
United hold		Swing	N/A	

=== Hoopstad ===
General election 1938: Hoopstad
Party	Candidate	Votes	%	±%
United	Johannes Hendrikus Viljoen	3,414	52.9	N/A
Purified National	Theophilus Ebenhaezer Dönges	3,021	46.7	New
Rejected ballots		24	0.4	N/A
Majority		402	6.2	N/A
Turnout		6,450	95.8	N/A
United hold		Swing	N/A	

=== Kroonstad ===
General election 1938: Kroonstad
Party	Candidate	Votes	%	±%
United	George James Fullard	3,830	54.8	−27.2
Purified National	J. H. Serfontein	3,096	44.3	New
Rejected ballots		63	0.9	-0.1
Majority		734	10.5	N/A
Turnout		6,989	89.2	+42.1
United hold		Swing	N/A	

=== Ladybrand ===
General election 1938: Ladybrand
Party	Candidate	Votes	%	±%
United	Jan Cloete de Wet	3,476	52.3	New
Purified National	Charles Robberts Swart	3,112	46.8	N/A
Rejected ballots		58	0.9	N/A
Majority		364	5.5	N/A
Turnout		6,646	93.3	N/A
United gain from Purified National		Swing	N/A	

=== Senekal ===
General election 1938: Senekal
Party	Candidate	Votes	%	±%
Purified National	Pieter Willem Adriaan Pieterse	3,269	51.1	New
United	P. A. Froneman	3,114	48.6	N/A
Rejected ballots		19	0.3	N/A
Majority		155	2.4	N/A
Turnout		6,402	93.7	N/A
Purified National gain from United		Swing	N/A	

=== Smithfield ===
General election 1938: Smithfield
Party	Candidate	Votes	%	±%
United	James Barry Munnik Hertzog	3,566	53.5	N/A
Purified National	Jacobus Johannes Fouché	3,040	45.6	New
Rejected ballots		63	0.9	N/A
Majority		526	7.9	N/A
Turnout		6,669	94.2	N/A
United hold		Swing	N/A	

=== Vredefort ===
General election 1938: Vredefort
Party	Candidate	Votes	%	±%
United	Edwin Alfred Conroy	3,448	55.1	N/A
Purified National	E. J. J. van der Horst	2,748	43.9	New
Rejected ballots		57	1.0	N/A
Majority		700	11.2	N/A
Turnout		6,253	85.2	N/A
United hold		Swing	N/A	

=== Winburg ===
General election 1938: Winburg
Party	Candidate	Votes	%	±%
Purified National	Nicolaas Johannes van der Merwe	3,399	50.0	N/A
United	H. J. Edeling	3,358	49.4	New
Rejected ballots		40	0.6	N/A
Majority		41	0.6	N/A
Turnout		6,797	95.3	N/A
Purified National hold		Swing	N/A	

== Transvaal ==
Party	Votes	%	Seats
United Party	185,323	58.49	57
Purified National Party	75,625	23.87	1
Labour Party	29,859	9.42	2
Dominion Party	12,909	4.07	0
Ind. Labour Party	419	0.13	0
Independents	12,686	4.00	0
Total	316,821	100.00	60
Source: Schoeman

=== Barberton ===
General election 1938: Barberton
Party	Candidate	Votes	%	±%
United	Deneys Reitz	2,574	67.6	N/A
Purified National	W. C. J. Brink	1,193	31.3	New
Rejected ballots		39	1.1	N/A
Majority		1,381	36.3	N/A
Turnout		3,806	73.3	N/A
United hold		Swing	N/A	

=== Benoni ===
General election 1938: Benoni
Party	Candidate	Votes	%	±%
Labour	Walter Bayley Madeley	2,920	55.9	−8.0
United	R. Hilton-Howie	1,434	27.4	−7.9
Purified National	C. S. H. Potgieter	836	16.0	New
Rejected ballots		36	0.7	-0.1
Majority		1,486	28.4	−0.2
Turnout		5,226	79.2	−3.7
Labour hold		Swing	-0.1	

=== Bethal ===
General election 1938: Bethal
Party	Candidate	Votes	%	±%
United	Joseph Petrus Jooste	3,180	63.5	N/A
Purified National	W. C. J. Brink	1,795	35.8	New
Rejected ballots		32	0.7	N/A
Majority		1,385	27.7	N/A
Turnout		5,007	89.4	N/A
United hold		Swing	N/A	

=== Bezuidenhout ===
General election 1938: Bezuidenhout
Party	Candidate	Votes	%	±%
United	Harold Augustus Tothill	3,867	67.9	+8.0
Dominion	H. G. Trollip	1,134	19.9	New
Labour	A. S. Kotze	668	11.7	−3.1
Independent	S. S. Friedman	8	0.1	New
Rejected ballots		21	0.4	-0.7
Majority		2,733	48.0	N/A
Turnout		5,698	70.6	+9.9
United hold		Swing	N/A	

=== Boksburg ===
General election 1938: Boksburg
Party	Candidate	Votes	%	±%
United	Louis Botha Klopper	2,974	49.0	New
Labour	P. A. Venter	1,309	21.6	−7.3
Purified National	F. B. van K. Crots	1,276	21.0	New
Dominion	A. F. Green	487	8.0	New
Rejected ballots		20	0.4	+-0
Majority		1,665	27.4	N/A
Turnout		6,066	79.1	+5.1
United gain from Roos		Swing	N/A	

=== Brakpan ===
General election 1938: Brakpan
Party	Candidate	Votes	%	±%
United	Alfred Ernest Trollip	3,377	48.0	+23.5
Purified National	S. D. de Kock	2,276	32.4	New
Labour	F. W. Lippiatt	1,346	19.1	−3.0
Rejected ballots		34	0.5	+0.1
Majority		1,101	15.7	N/A
Turnout		7,033	74.7	+1.4
United hold		Swing	N/A	

=== Brits ===
General election 1938: Brits
Party	Candidate	Votes	%	±%
United	Jan Harm Grobler	2,673	56.0	−7.4
Purified National	C. G. du Toit	2,034	42.6	New
Rejected ballots		64	1.4	+0.9
Majority		639	13.4	N/A
Turnout		4,771	85.2	+10.8
United hold		Swing	N/A	

=== Carolina ===
General election 1938: Carolina
Party	Candidate	Votes	%	±%
United	Johannes Petrus Fourie	2,573	62.7	+10.7
Purified National	J. C. Fourie	1,481	36.1	New
Rejected ballots		51	1.2	+0.4
Majority		1,092	26.6	N/A
Turnout		4,105	78.9	+1.4
United hold		Swing	N/A	

=== Christiana ===
General election 1938: Christiana
Party	Candidate	Votes	%	±%
United	Jan Johannes Wentzel	2,794	56.1	−16.9
Purified National	J. L. Brill	2,148	43.1	New
Rejected ballots		40	0.8	-0.7
Majority		646	13.0	N/A
Turnout		4,982	85.8	+10.6
United hold		Swing	N/A	

=== Delarey ===
General election 1938: Delarey
Party	Candidate	Votes	%	±%
United	Johannes Stephanus Labuschagne	2,849	59.9	N/A
Purified National	C. J. Claassen	1,869	39.3	New
Rejected ballots		39	0.8	N/A
Majority		980	20.6	N/A
Turnout		4,757	89.5	N/A
United hold		Swing	N/A	

=== Ermelo ===
General election 1938: Ermelo
Party	Candidate	Votes	%	±%
United	David Jackson	2,701	59.2	N/A
Independent	J. J. Smit	1,842	40.4	New
Rejected ballots		21	0.4	N/A
Majority		859	18.8	N/A
Turnout		4,564	84.6	N/A
United hold		Swing	N/A	

=== Fordsburg ===
General election 1938: Fordsburg
Party	Candidate	Votes	%	±%
United	Barend Jacobus Schoeman	2,582	51.1	+15.5
Labour	Thomas Chalmers Robertson	1,455	28.8	New
Purified National	M. van der Ahee	972	19.2	New
Rejected ballots		43	0.9	-0.2
Majority		113	2.9	N/A
Turnout		5,052	68.6	+6.7
United hold		Swing	N/A	

=== Germiston North ===
General election 1938: Germiston North
Party	Candidate	Votes	%	±%
United	Sylvester Cornelius Quinlan	2,813	42.5	New
Purified National	H. J. Zwanepoel	1,707	25.8	New
Labour	T. Stark	1,108	16.8	New
Independent	R. Strachan	873	13.2	New
Independent	P. J. J. van V. Zietsman	61	0.9	New
Rejected ballots		52	0.8	N/A
Majority		1,106	16.7	N/A
Turnout		6,614	78.4	N/A
United win (new seat)				

=== Germiston South ===
General election 1938: Germiston South
Party	Candidate	Votes	%	±%
United	Jacobus Gideon Nel Strauss	3,705	58.1	New
Purified National	Jan Hendrik Boneschans	1,823	28.6	New
Labour	W. T. Lever	790	12.4	New
Rejected ballots		57	0.9	N/A
Majority		1,882	29.5	N/A
Turnout		6,375	79.8	N/A
United win (new seat)				

=== Gezina ===
General election 1938: Gezina
Party	Candidate	Votes	%	±%
United	Oswald Pirow	3,436	63.7	N/A
Purified National	T. Wassenaar	1,907	35.4	New
Rejected ballots		50	0.9	N/A
Majority		1,529	28.4	N/A
Turnout		5,393	73.3	N/A
United hold		Swing	N/A	

=== Heidelberg ===
General election 1938: Heidelberg
Party	Candidate	Votes	%	±%
United	David Albert Stephen de Bruyn	2,876	59.8	N/A
Purified National	L. J. Buys	1,878	39.1	New
Rejected ballots		54	1.1	N/A
Majority		998	20.8	N/A
Turnout		4,808	77.2	N/A
United hold		Swing	N/A	

=== Hospital ===
General election 1938: Hospital
Party	Candidate	Votes	%	±%
United	Robert Hugh Henderson	4,449	77.7	+14.7
Dominion	G. H. Kretzschmer	911	15.9	New
Labour	S. Freedman	319	5.6	New
Rejected ballots		45	0.8	-0.7
Majority		3,538	61.8	N/A
Turnout		5,724	63.5	+10.8
United hold		Swing	N/A	

=== Jeppes ===
General election 1938: Jeppes
Party	Candidate	Votes	%	±%
United	Bertha Solomon	2,477	43.0	New
Labour	James Dominic Francis Briggs	2,184	37.9	+3.9
Purified National	N. J. van Schalkwyk	1,059	18.4	New
Rejected ballots		45	0.7	N/A
Majority		293	5.1	N/A
Turnout		5,765	69.3	+13.1
United gain from Roos		Swing	N/A	

=== Johannesburg North ===
General election 1938: Johannesburg North
Party	Candidate	Votes	%	±%
United	Jan Hendrik Hofmeyr	4,721	76.6	N/A
Purified National	A. H. Swartz	1,387	22.5	New
Rejected ballots		53	0.9	N/A
Majority		3,334	54.1	N/A
Turnout		6,161	74.6	N/A
United hold		Swing	N/A	

=== Johannesburg West ===
General election 1938: Johannesburg West
Party	Candidate	Votes	%	±%
United	Botho Helmuth Lindhorst	2,959	43.9	New
Purified National	Charl Wynand Markelbach du Toit	2,487	36.9	New
Labour	M. J. du Plessis	942	14.0	New
Independent	S. F. du Toit	316	4.7	New
Rejected ballots		42	0.6	N/A
Majority		472	7.0	N/A
Turnout		6,746	72.7	N/A
United win (new seat)				

=== Kensington ===
General election 1938: Kensington
Party	Candidate	Votes	%	±%
United	Leslie Blackwell	3,198	54.6	−16.5
Dominion	E. T. Stubbs	2,618	44.7	New
Rejected ballots		36	0.7	+0.1
Majority		580	9.9	N/A
Turnout		5,852	78.4	+17.1
United hold		Swing	N/A	

=== Klerksdorp ===
General election 1938: Klerksdorp
Party	Candidate	Votes	%	±%
United	Jan Wilkens	3,306	55.9	N/A
Purified National	E. Jooste	2,560	43.3	New
Rejected ballots		50	0.8	N/A
Majority		746	12.6	N/A
Turnout		5,916	87.3	N/A
United hold		Swing	N/A	

=== Krugersdorp ===
General election 1938: Krugersdorp
Party	Candidate	Votes	%	±%
Labour	Marthinus Johannes van den Berg	2,522	38.7	New
United	W. G. Delport	2,429	37.2	N/A
Purified National	Charl Wynand Markelbach du Toit	1,545	23.7	New
Rejected ballots		25	0.4	N/A
Majority		93	1.4	N/A
Turnout		6,521	80.2	N/A
Labour gain from National		Swing	N/A	

=== Langlaagte ===
General election 1938: Langlaagte
Party	Candidate	Votes	%	±%
United	William Bawden	2,631	48.8	−2.9
Labour	John Christie	1,963	36.4	−10.8
Purified National	W. P. Thorn	571	10.6	New
Independent	J. R. Hull	190	3.5	New
Rejected ballots		33	0.7	-0.4
Majority		668	12.4	+7.9
Turnout		5,388	72.4	+4.6
United hold		Swing	+4.0	

=== Lichtenburg ===
General election 1938: Lichtenburg
Party	Candidate	Votes	%	±%
United	Andries Johannes Swanepoel	2,466	58.3	−4.4
Purified National	F. J. Truter	1,715	40.5	New
Rejected ballots		48	1.2	-0.2
Majority		751	17.8	N/A
Turnout		4,229	83.3	+20.8
United hold		Swing	N/A	

=== Losberg ===
General election 1938: Losberg
Party	Candidate	Votes	%	±%
United	Gideon Petrus Brits	2,787	61.1	N/A
Purified National	J. I. F. Brits	1,430	31.4	New
Independent	J. J. le Grange	314	6.9	New
Rejected ballots		28	0.6	N/A
Majority		1,357	29.8	N/A
Turnout		4,559	80.1	N/A
United hold		Swing	N/A	

=== Lydenburg ===
General election 1938: Lydenburg
Party	Candidate	Votes	%	±%
United	Nicolaas Johannes Schoeman	2,683	63.6	N/A
Purified National	H. Neethling	1,416	33.6	New
Independent	A. Op't Hof	94	2.2	New
Rejected ballots		26	0.6	N/A
Majority		1,357	30.0	N/A
Turnout		4,219	82.9	N/A
United hold		Swing	N/A	

=== Marico ===
General election 1938: Marico
Party	Candidate	Votes	%	±%
United	Johannes Jacobus Pienaar	2,533	53.5	N/A
Purified National	H. C. M. Fourie	2,179	46.0	New
Rejected ballots		24	0.5	N/A
Majority		354	7.5	N/A
Turnout		4,736	91.9	N/A
United hold		Swing	N/A	

=== Middelburg ===
General election 1938: Middelburg
Party	Candidate	Votes	%	±%
United	Petrus Jacobus Bosman	2,632	60.2	N/A
Purified National	T. McDonald	1,692	38.7	New
Rejected ballots		46	1.1	N/A
Majority		940	21.5	N/A
Turnout		4,370	85.2	N/A
United hold		Swing	N/A	

=== North East Rand ===
General election 1938: North East Rand
Party	Candidate	Votes	%	±%
United	Gerhardus Coenraad Scheepers Heyns	3,608	69.0	New
Purified National	F. D. van Alphen	1,569	30.0	New
Rejected ballots		49	1.0	N/A
Majority		2,039	39.0	N/A
Turnout		5,226	71.3	N/A
United win (new seat)				

=== North Rand ===
General election 1938: North Rand
Party	Candidate	Votes	%	±%
United	Abraham Stephan de Kock	3,343	55.9	N/A
Purified National	Martha Mabel Jansen	1,392	23.3	New
Labour	A. E. Carlisle	1,222	20.4	New
Rejected ballots		23	0.4	N/A
Majority		1,357	32.6	N/A
Turnout		5,980	77.6	N/A
United hold		Swing	N/A	

=== Orange Grove ===
General election 1938: Orange Grove
Party	Candidate	Votes	%	±%
United	Colin Bain-Marais	4,549	68.2	New
Dominion	P. A. Moore	1,783	26.7	New
Labour	J. Liebman	311	4.7	New
Rejected ballots		30	0.4	N/A
Majority		2,766	41.5	N/A
Turnout		6,673	78.8	N/A
United win (new seat)				

=== Parktown ===
General election 1938: Parktown
Party	Candidate	Votes	%	±%
United	Leila Agnes Buissinné Reitz	4,261	72.4	N/A
Independent	F. Brickman	1,181	20.1	New
Labour	F. A. W. Lucas	419	7.1	New
Rejected ballots		21	0.4	N/A
Majority		3,080	52.4	N/A
Turnout		5,882	75.8	N/A
United hold		Swing	N/A	

=== Pietersburg ===
General election 1938: Pietersburg
Party	Candidate	Votes	%	±%
United	Jozua François Naudé	2,391	53.8	−14.4
Purified National	C. Hofmeyr	2,004	45.1	New
Rejected ballots		47	1.1	+0.2
Majority		387	8.7	N/A
Turnout		4,442	83.4	+11.9
United hold		Swing	N/A	

=== Potchefstroom ===
General election 1938: Potchefstroom
Party	Candidate	Votes	%	±%
United	Hubert van der Merwe	3,217	61.0	+7.5
Purified National	W. J. de Klerk	2,032	38.5	New
Rejected ballots		23	0.5	-0.4
Majority		1,185	22.5	N/A
Turnout		5,272	84.7	+9.2
United hold		Swing	N/A	

=== Potgietersrus ===
General election 1938: Potgietersrus
Party	Candidate	Votes	%	±%
United	Schalk Willem Naudé	2,255	50.4	−9.2
Purified National	D. J. Naudé	2,176	48.6	New
Rejected ballots		45	1.0	-0.8
Majority		79	1.8	N/A
Turnout		4,476	84.3	+7.6
United hold		Swing	N/A	

=== Pretoria Central ===
General election 1938: Pretoria Central
Party	Candidate	Votes	%	±%
United	Percy Vivian Pocock	3,667	78.8	N/A
Dominion	M. R. Atteridge	949	20.4	New
Rejected ballots		37	0.8	N/A
Majority		2,718	58.4	N/A
Turnout		4,653	67.9	N/A
United hold		Swing	N/A	

=== Pretoria City ===
General election 1938: Pretoria City
Party	Candidate	Votes	%	±%
United	Albrecht Ernest Campbell	2,937	58.4	New
Purified National	D. J. G. van den Heever	1,467	29.2	New
Labour	M. Retief	586	11.7	New
Rejected ballots		40	0.7	N/A
Majority		1,470	29.2	N/A
Turnout		5,030	90.6	N/A
United win (new seat)				

=== Pretoria District ===
General election 1938: Pretoria District
Party	Candidate	Votes	%	±%
United	Harm Oost	2,554	55.3	N/A
Purified National	J. J. Erasmus	2,027	43.9	New
Rejected ballots		40	0.8	N/A
Majority		527	11.4	N/A
Turnout		4,621	83.2	N/A
United hold		Swing	N/A	

=== Pretoria East ===
General election 1938: Pretoria East
Party	Candidate	Votes	%	±%
United	Charles William Clark	3,926	74.5	−2.1
Independent	G. H. Wilsenach	1,323	25.1	New
Rejected ballots		18	0.4	-0.4
Majority		2,603	49.4	N/A
Turnout		5,267	71.2	+3.2
United hold		Swing	N/A	

=== Pretoria West ===
General election 1938: Pretoria West
Party	Candidate	Votes	%	±%
United	Izaak Wallach	2,330	44.4	+5.6
Purified National	M. D. C. de W. Nel	2,178	41.5	New
Labour	T. P. C. Boezaart	715	13.6	New
Rejected ballots		21	0.5	+-0
Majority		152	2.9	N/A
Turnout		5,244	71.9	+6.5
United hold		Swing	N/A	

=== Roodepoort ===
General election 1938: Roodepoort
Party	Candidate	Votes	%	±%
United	Frederick Brewster Allen	2,493	38.3	New
Dominion	Charles Frampton Stallard	2,119	32.5	N/A
Purified National	A. S. van Hees	956	14.7	New
Labour	A. M. Merkel	912	14.0	New
Rejected ballots		33	0.5	N/A
Majority		374	5.7	N/A
Turnout		6,513	78.4	N/A
United gain from Dominion		Swing	N/A	

=== Rosettenville ===
General election 1938: Rosettenville
Party	Candidate	Votes	%	±%
United	Frederick Theunis Howarth	3,206	59.6	−0.9
Labour	C. Beckett	2,139	39.8	+1.2
Rejected ballots		32	0.6	-0.3
Majority		1,067	19.8	−2.1
Turnout		5,377	73.9	+13.1
United hold		Swing	-1.1	

=== Rustenburg ===
General election 1938: Rustenburg
Party	Candidate	Votes	%	±%
United	Johannes Marthinus Conradie	2,260	48.3	−7.2
Purified National	N. J. J. Combrink	1,599	34.2	New
Independent	P. W. C. de Wit	786	16.8	New
Rejected ballots		32	0.7	-0.5
Majority		661	14.1	N/A
Turnout		4,677	87.6	+8.3
United hold		Swing	N/A	

=== Soutpansberg ===
General election 1938: Soutpansberg
Party	Candidate	Votes	%	±%
United	Edward Alexander Rooth	2,386	57.8	−27.7
Purified National	S. W. Spies	1,686	40.8	New
Rejected ballots		56	1.4	+0.7
Majority		700	17.0	N/A
Turnout		4,128	79.9	+16.3
United hold		Swing	N/A	

=== Springs ===
General election 1938: Springs
Party	Candidate	Votes	%	±%
United	George James Sutter	4,276	63.9	+1.3
Labour	P. J. Baird	2,363	35.3	New
Rejected ballots		53	0.8	+-0
Majority		1,913	28.6	N/A
Turnout		6,692	70.2	+0.4
United hold		Swing	N/A	

=== Standerton ===
General election 1938: Standerton
Party	Candidate	Votes	%	±%
United	Jan Christian Smuts	3,220	66.9	N/A
Independent	P. v.d. M. Martins	1,552	32.2	New
Rejected ballots		43	0.9	N/A
Majority		1,668	34.6	N/A
Turnout		4,815	87.0	N/A
United hold		Swing	N/A	

=== Swartruggens ===
General election 1938: Swartruggens
Party	Candidate	Votes	%	±%
United	Joseph Dearlove Hardy Verster	2,272	50.1	N/A
Independent	J. D. Roos	1,871	41.3	New
Purified National	W. J. Loots	372	8.2	New
Rejected ballots		16	0.4	N/A
Majority		401	8.9	N/A
Turnout		4,531	88.4	N/A
United hold		Swing	N/A	

=== Troyeville ===
General election 1938: Troyeville
Party	Candidate	Votes	%	±%
United	Morris Kentridge	3,818	72.3	N/A
Labour	D. H. Epstein	1,375	26.0	New
Rejected ballots		86	1.7	N/A
Majority		1,913	46.3	N/A
Turnout		5,179	70.4	N/A
United hold		Swing	N/A	

=== Turffontein ===
General election 1938: Turffontein
Party	Candidate	Votes	%	±%
United	Frederick Claud Sturrock	3,142	54.6	New
Labour	J. McPherson	1,224	21.3	New
Purified National	J. P. Pienaar	762	13.2	New
Dominion	W. E. J. Clarke	591	10.3	N/A
Rejected ballots		35	0.6	N/A
Majority		1,918	33.3	N/A
Turnout		5,754	74.1	N/A
United hold		Swing	N/A	

=== Ventersdorp ===
General election 1938: Ventersdorp
Party	Candidate	Votes	%	±%
United	Jacob Wilkens	2,838	60.7	+0.8
Purified National	M. C. Eloff	1,822	38.9	New
Rejected ballots		19	0.4	-0.3
Majority		1,016	21.7	N/A
Turnout		4,679	88.2	+7.6
		Swing	N/A	

=== Vereeniging ===
General election 1938: Vereeniging
Party	Candidate	Votes	%	±%
United	Karel Rood	4,820	73.8	N/A
Purified National	Willem Frederik Hendrik Huyzers	1,634	25.0	New
Rejected ballots		78	1.2	N/A
Majority		3,186	48.8	N/A
Turnout		6,532	84.2	N/A
		Swing	N/A	

=== Von Brandis ===
General election 1938: Von Brandis
Party	Candidate	Votes	%	±%
United	John Waterston Higgerty	4,240	74.5	+1.1
Dominion	B. D. Coplans	1,395	24.5	New
Rejected ballots		57	1.0	-0.3
Majority		2,845	50.0	N/A
Turnout		5,692	67.2	+18.0
United hold		Swing	N/A	

=== Vrededorp ===
General election 1938: Vrededorp
Party	Candidate	Votes	%	±%
United	Carolina Cathrina Elizabeth Badenhorst	3,121	44.7	New
Purified National	D. A. J. de Flemingh	2,614	37.4	New
Labour	G. C. V. Odendaal	1,184	17.0	New
Rejected ballots		63	0.9	-0.1
Majority		507	7.3	N/A
Turnout		6,982	73.4	+12.2
United hold		Swing	N/A	

=== Wakkerstroom ===
General election 1938: Wakkerstroom
Party	Candidate	Votes	%	±%
United	William Richard Collins	2,687	54.1	New
Independent	P. v.d. M. Martins	2,225	44.8	N/A
Rejected ballots		56	1.1	N/A
Majority		462	9.3	N/A
Turnout		4,968	87.3	N/A
United gain from Independent		Swing	N/A	

=== Waterberg ===
General election 1938: Waterberg
Party	Candidate	Votes	%	±%
Purified National	Johannes Gerhardus Strijdom	2,355	52.1	N/A
United	W. I. S. Driver	2,113	46.8	New
Rejected ballots		49	1.1	N/A
Majority		242	5.4	N/A
Turnout		4,517	89.9	N/A
Purified National hold		Swing	N/A	

=== Witbank ===
General election 1938: Witbank
Party	Candidate	Votes	%	±%
United	Jacobus Theodorus Bezuidenhout	3,051	64.2	N/A
Purified National	H. I. J. van Rensburg	1,356	28.5	New
Labour	J. S. M. Stone	302	6.4	New
Rejected ballots		43	0.9	+0.5
Majority		1,695	35.7	N/A
Turnout		4,752	79.5	+9.4
United hold		Swing	N/A	

=== Wolmaransstad ===
General election 1938: Wolmaransstad
Party	Candidate	Votes	%	±%
United	Jan Christoffel Greyling Kemp	2,836	59.8	N/A
Purified National	H. C. W. van der Merwe	1,859	39.2	New
Rejected ballots		48	1.0	N/A
Majority		977	20.6	N/A
Turnout		4,743	90.9	N/A
United hold		Swing	N/A	

=== Wonderboom ===
General election 1938: Wonderboom
Party	Candidate	Votes	%	±%
United	Johannes Albertus Petrus Venter	2,539	49.2	−4.2
Purified National	A. E. du Toit	2,530	49.0	New
Independent	J. P. Joubert	51	1.0	New
Rejected ballots		49	0.8	-0.2
Majority		9	0.2	N/A
Turnout		5,161	80.1	+12.5
United hold		Swing	N/A	

=== Yeoville ===
General election 1938: Yeoville
Party	Candidate	Votes	%	±%
United	Henry Gluckman	5,288	84.6	New
Dominion	M. G. de B. Epstein	922	14.7	N/A
Rejected ballots		41	0.7	N/A
Majority		4,366	69.8	N/A
Turnout		6,251	78.5	N/A
United hold		Swing	N/A	

== Sources ==
- Schoeman, B.M. (1977). Parlementêre verkiesings in Suid-Afrika 1910-1976. Pretoria: Aktuele Publikasies.
- Standard Encyclopaedia of Southern Africa (1972). "House of Assembly" (vol. 5, pp. 617–636). Cape Town: Nasionale Opvoedkundige Uitgewery (Nasou).
- South Africa Government Gazette dated 1938-06-10 number 2534 (1938). Pretoria
