= Pietermaritzburg City (House of Assembly of South Africa constituency) =

Constituency in the Natal Province of South Africa

- Pietermaritzburg-Stad
- Former constituency for the South African House of Assembly
- Province: Natal
- Electorate: 14,154 (1970)

Former constituency
- Created: 1938
- Abolished: 1974
- Number of members: 1
- Last MHA: W. J. B. Smith (UP)
- Created from: Pietermaritzburg North
- Replaced by: Pietermaritzburg North; Pietermaritzburg South

Pietermaritzburg City (Afrikaans: Pietermaritzburg-Stad) was a constituency in the Natal Province of South Africa, which existed from 1938 to 1974. As the name implies, it covered the inner parts of Pietermaritzburg, the provincial capital. Throughout its existence it elected one member to the House of Assembly.

== Franchise notes ==
When the Union of South Africa was formed in 1910, the electoral qualifications in use in each pre-existing colony were kept in place. The franchise used in the Natal Colony, while theoretically not restricted by race, was significantly less liberal than that of the Cape, and no more than a few hundred non-white electors ever qualified. In 1908, an estimated 200 of the 22,786 electors in the colony were of non-European descent, and by 1935, only one remained. By 1958, when the last non-white voters in the Cape were taken off the rolls, Natal too had an all-white electorate. The franchise was also restricted by property and education qualifications until the 1933 general election, following the passage of the Women's Enfranchisement Act, 1930 and the Franchise Laws Amendment Act, 1931. From then on, the franchise was given to all white citizens aged 21 or over, which remained the case until the end of apartheid and the introduction of universal suffrage in 1994.

== History ==
Despite its Afrikaans name, Pietermaritzburg's white population (and consequently, its pre-1994 electorate) is predominantly English-speaking, and like the rest of Natal, its politics were largely supportive of the pro-British side of South African politics. The city was initially divided into a North and a South seat, but in 1929, it was reconfigured and the District seat created. Unusually, for its first nine years, the District seat coexisted with Pietermaritzburg North, and no City seat existed, but this was created in 1938 and Pietermaritzburg's constituencies were brought into line with those of other mid-sized South African cities like Bloemfontein and Kimberley.

Pietermaritzburg City's first MP, William Arthur Deane, had previously represented the abolished seat of Pietermaritzburg North, and like most Natal MPs of the era, was a member of the United Party. This party would hold the seat at every election, but not quite throughout its existence: Howard George Oliver Odell, elected for the UP in 1961, defected to the governing National Party sometime during his term, and attempted to recontest the seat under their banner in 1966. He was narrowly defeated by the UP candidate, William John Brafield Smith, who held the seat until its abolition in 1974. As with all other mid-sized South African cities except Germiston, Pietermaritzburg's constituencies were reconfigured in that year to abolish the City and District seats and return to compass-point constituencies - in this case, the North and South seats were recreated. Odell returned in 1974 to contest the newly-recreated Pietermaritzburg North seat, but again failed in his bid.

== Members ==
Election	Member	Party
1938	W. A. Deane	United
1943	O. L. Shearer	United
1948	O. L. Shearer	United
1953	O. L. Shearer	United
1958	O. L. Shearer	United
1961	H. G. O. Odell	United
	H. G. O. Odell	National
1966	W. J. B. Smith	United
1970	W. J. B. Smith	United
1974	Constituency abolished	

== Detailed results ==
=== Elections in the 1930s ===
General election 1938: Pietermaritzburg City
Party	Candidate	Votes	%	±%
United	W. A. Deane	2,848	61.5	New
Independent	R. Dunlop	1,721	37.2	New
Rejected ballots		59	1.3	N/A
Majority		1,127	24.4	N/A
Turnout		4,628	70.8	N/A
United win (new seat)				
