= Pietermaritzburg District (House of Assembly of South Africa constituency) =

Constituency in the Natal Province of South Africa

- Pietermaritzburg-Distrik
- Former constituency for the South African House of Assembly
- Province: Natal
- Electorate: 13,027 (1970)

Former constituency
- Created: 1929
- Abolished: 1974
- Number of members: 1
- Last MHA: W. T. Webber (UP)
- Created from: Pietermaritzburg South
- Replaced by: Pietermaritzburg North; Pietermaritzburg South

Pietermaritzburg District (Afrikaans: Pietermaritzburg-Distrik) was a constituency in the Natal Province of South Africa, which existed from 1929 to 1974. As the name implies, it covered the area surrounding Pietermaritzburg, the provincial capital. Throughout its existence it elected one member to the House of Assembly.

== Franchise notes ==
When the Union of South Africa was formed in 1910, the electoral qualifications in use in each pre-existing colony were kept in place. The franchise used in the Natal Colony, while theoretically not restricted by race, was significantly less liberal than that of the Cape, and no more than a few hundred non-white electors ever qualified. In 1908, an estimated 200 of the 22,786 electors in the colony were of non-European descent, and by 1935, only one remained. By 1958, when the last non-white voters in the Cape were taken off the rolls, Natal too had an all-white electorate. The franchise was also restricted by property and education qualifications until the 1933 general election, following the passage of the Women's Enfranchisement Act, 1930 and the Franchise Laws Amendment Act, 1931. From then on, the franchise was given to all white citizens aged 21 or over, which remained the case until the end of apartheid and the introduction of universal suffrage in 1994.

== History ==
Despite its Afrikaans name, Pietermaritzburg's white population (and consequently, its pre-1994 electorate) is predominantly English-speaking, and like the rest of Natal, its politics were largely supportive of the pro-British side of South African politics. The city was initially divided into a North and a South seat, but in 1929, it was reconfigured and the District seat created. Unusually, for its first nine years, the seat coexisted with Pietermaritzburg North, and no City seat existed, but this was created in 1938 and Pietermaritzburg's constituencies were brought into line with those of other mid-sized South African cities like Bloemfontein and Kimberley.

Pietermaritzburg District's first MP, William John O'Brien, had previously represented the abolished seat of Pietermaritzburg South, and like most Natal MPs of the era, was a member of the South African Party. He followed most of the SAP into the United Party in 1934, and the UP held the seat in 1938, but the MP elected that year left parliament in 1939, and this provided an opportunity for Dominion Party leader Charles Stallard, who had lost his own seat in Roodepoort, to re-enter parliament. Stallard would represent Pietermaritzburg District until his retirement in 1948, at which point the seat reverted to the UP, who would hold it through the remainder of its history. In 1974, like every other "District" seat in South Africa except for Germiston District, it was abolished, and Pietermaritzburg returned to its original north–south division. Warwick Trollip Webber, the seat's final MP, was elected for Pietermaritzburg South and served one more term for that seat, retiring in 1977.

== Members ==
Election	Member	Party
1929	W. J. O'Brien	South African
1933	W. J. O'Brien	South African
1934	W. J. O'Brien	United
1938	F. N. Broome	United
1939 by	Charles Stallard	Dominion
1943	Charles Stallard	Dominion
1948	B. H. Henwood	United
1953	B. H. Henwood	United
1958	B. H. Henwood	United
1961	B. H. Henwood	United
1966	W. T. Webber	United
1970	W. T. Webber	United
1974	Constituency abolished	

== Detailed results ==
=== Elections in the 1920s ===
General election 1929: Pietermaritzburg District
Party	Candidate	Votes	%	±%
South African	W. J. O'Brien	Unopposed		
South African win (new seat)				

=== Elections in the 1930s ===
General election 1933: Pietermaritzburg District
Party	Candidate	Votes	%	±%
South African	W. J. O'Brien	2,389	53.1	N/A
Natal Home Rule Party	N. P. Palmer	2,087	46.4	New
Rejected ballots		24	0.5	N/A
Majority		302	6.7	N/A
Turnout		4,500	71.8	N/A
South African hold		Swing	N/A	

General election 1938: Pietermaritzburg District
Party	Candidate	Votes	%	±%
United	F. N. Broome	2,755	59.7	+6.6
Dominion	C. G. Leftwich	1,839	39.9	New
Rejected ballots		17	0.4	-0.1
Majority		916	19.9	N/A
Turnout		4,611	79.2	+7.4
United hold		Swing	N/A	

Pietermaritzburg District by-election, 19 April 1939
Party	Candidate	Votes	%	±%
Dominion	Charles Stallard	2,893	94.0	+54.1
United	Charles Francis Clarkson	148	4.8	−54.9
Rejected ballots		36	1.2	+0.7
Majority		2,745	89.2	N/A
Turnout		3,077	53.0	−26.2
Dominion hold		Swing	+54.5	
