= Pretoria City (House of Assembly of South Africa constituency) =

South African constituency, 1938–1958

- Pretoria-Stad
- Former constituency for the South African House of Assembly
- Province: Transvaal
- Electorate: 11,003 (1953)

Former constituency
- Created: 1938
- Abolished: 1958
- Number of members: 1
- Last MHA: J. H. Visse (NP)
- Created from: Pretoria Central
- Replaced by: Prinshof

Pretoria City (Afrikaans: Pretoria-Stad) was a constituency in the Transvaal Province of South Africa, which existed from 1938 to 1958. It covered parts of the city centre of Pretoria, the administrative capital of South Africa. Throughout its existence it elected one member to the House of Assembly and one to the Transvaal Provincial Council.

== Franchise notes ==
When the Union of South Africa was formed in 1910, the electoral qualifications in use in each pre-existing colony were kept in place. In the Transvaal Colony, and its predecessor the South African Republic, the vote was restricted to white men, and as such, elections in the Transvaal Province were held on a whites-only franchise from the beginning. The franchise was also restricted by property and education qualifications until the 1933 general election, following the passage of the Women's Enfranchisement Act, 1930 and the Franchise Laws Amendment Act, 1931. From then on, the franchise was given to all white citizens aged 21 or over. Non-whites remained disenfranchised until the end of apartheid and the introduction of universal suffrage in 1994.

== History ==
Pretoria City was a relatively short-lived seat, existing only for twenty years, and confusingly coexisted for that entire period with Pretoria Central - the two seats covering different parts of Pretoria's inner city. Like the rest of Pretoria, the seat initially favoured the United Party, but fell in 1953 to the governing National Party, whose MP, Jan Hendrik Visse, moved to the newly created seat of Prinshof on Pretoria City's abolition.

== Members ==
Election	Member	Party
1938	A. E. Campbell	United
1939 by	Adolf Davis	United
1943	Adolf Davis	United
1948	Adolf Davis	United
1953	J. H. Visse	National
1958	constituency abolished	

== Detailed results ==
=== Elections in the 1930s ===
General election 1938: Pretoria City
Party	Candidate	Votes	%	±%
United	A. E. Campbell	2,937	58.4	New
Purified National	D. J. G. van den Heever	1,467	29.2	New
Labour	M. Retief	586	11.7	New
Rejected ballots		40	0.7	N/A
Majority		1,470	29.2	N/A
Turnout		5,030	90.6	N/A
United win (new seat)				

Pretoria City by-election, 8 March 1939
Party	Candidate	Votes	%	±%
United	Adolf Davis	2,193	44.3	−14.1
Purified National	D. J. G. van den Heever	2,003	40.4	+11.2
Dominion	J. J. Cooke	728	14.7	New
Rejected ballots		28	0.6	-0.1
Majority		190	3.8	−25.4
Turnout		4,952	69.4	−21.2
United hold		Swing	-12.7	
