= Kimberley District (House of Assembly of South Africa constituency) =

South African constituency, 1938–1958

- Kimberley-Distrik
- Former constituency for the South African House of Assembly
- Province: Cape of Good Hope
- Electorate: 9,671 (1953)

Former constituency
- Created: 1938
- Abolished: 1958
- Number of members: 1
- Last MHA: H. T. van G. Bekker (NP)
- Created from: Beaconsfield
- Replaced by: Kimberley North; Kimberley South

Kimberley District (Afrikaans: Kimberley-Distrik) was a constituency in the Cape Province of South Africa, which existed from 1938 to 1958. It covered a rural area of the Northern Cape surrounding the city of Kimberley. Throughout its existence it elected one member to the House of Assembly and one to the Cape Provincial Council.

== Franchise notes ==
When the Union of South Africa was formed in 1910, the electoral qualifications in use in each pre-existing colony were kept in place. The Cape Colony had implemented a “colour-blind” franchise known as the Cape Qualified Franchise, which included all adult literate men owning more than £75 worth of property (controversially raised from £25 in 1892), and this initially remained in effect after the colony became the Cape Province. As of 1908, 22,784 out of 152,221 electors in the Cape Colony were “Native or Coloured”. Eligibility to serve in Parliament and the Provincial Council, however, was restricted to whites from 1910 onward.

The first challenge to the Cape Qualified Franchise came with the Women's Enfranchisement Act, 1930 and the Franchise Laws Amendment Act, 1931, which extended the vote to women and removed property qualifications for the white population only – non-white voters remained subject to the earlier restrictions. In 1936, the Representation of Natives Act removed all black voters from the common electoral roll and introduced three “Native Representative Members”, white MPs elected by the black voters of the province and meant to represent their interests in particular. A similar provision was made for Coloured voters with the Separate Representation of Voters Act, 1951, and although this law was challenged by the courts, it went into effect in time for the 1958 general election, which was thus held with all-white voter rolls for the first time in South African history. The all-white franchise would continue until the end of apartheid and the introduction of universal suffrage in 1994.

== History ==
Kimberley District was, much like other "District" seats across South Africa, politically marginal. Of the four general elections contested in the seat, the first two were won by the United Party and the later two by the National Party - this corresponded with nationwide victories for those parties, making Kimberley District a bellwether seat throughout its short existence (not counting by-elections). Its first MP, Lourens Jacobus Steytler, had earlier represented the seat of Albert for the National Party, but stayed in the UP throughout his time representing Kimberley District, leaving in 1945. At the resulting by-election, the NP captured the seat with Hermanus Theodorus van Ginkel Bekker, who would hold the seat for the remainder of its existence. In 1958, Kimberley was reconfigured into a North and a South seat, and Bekker continued to represent Kimberley North until 1964.

== Members ==
Election	Member	Party
1938	L. J. Steytler	United
1943	L. J. Steytler	United
1948	H. T. van G. Bekker	HNP
1953	H. T. van G. Bekker	National
1958	constituency abolished	

== Detailed results ==
=== Elections in the 1930s ===
General election 1938: Kimberley District
Party	Candidate	Votes	%	±%
United	L. J. Steytler	3,024	52.0	New
Purified National	J. J. Versluis	2,705	46.5	New
Rejected ballots		88	1.5	N/A
Majority		319	5.5	N/A
Turnout		5,817	86.0	N/A
United win (new seat)				
