= South Coast (House of Assembly of South Africa constituency) =

South African constituency, 1910–1994

- Suidkus
- Former constituency for the South African House of Assembly
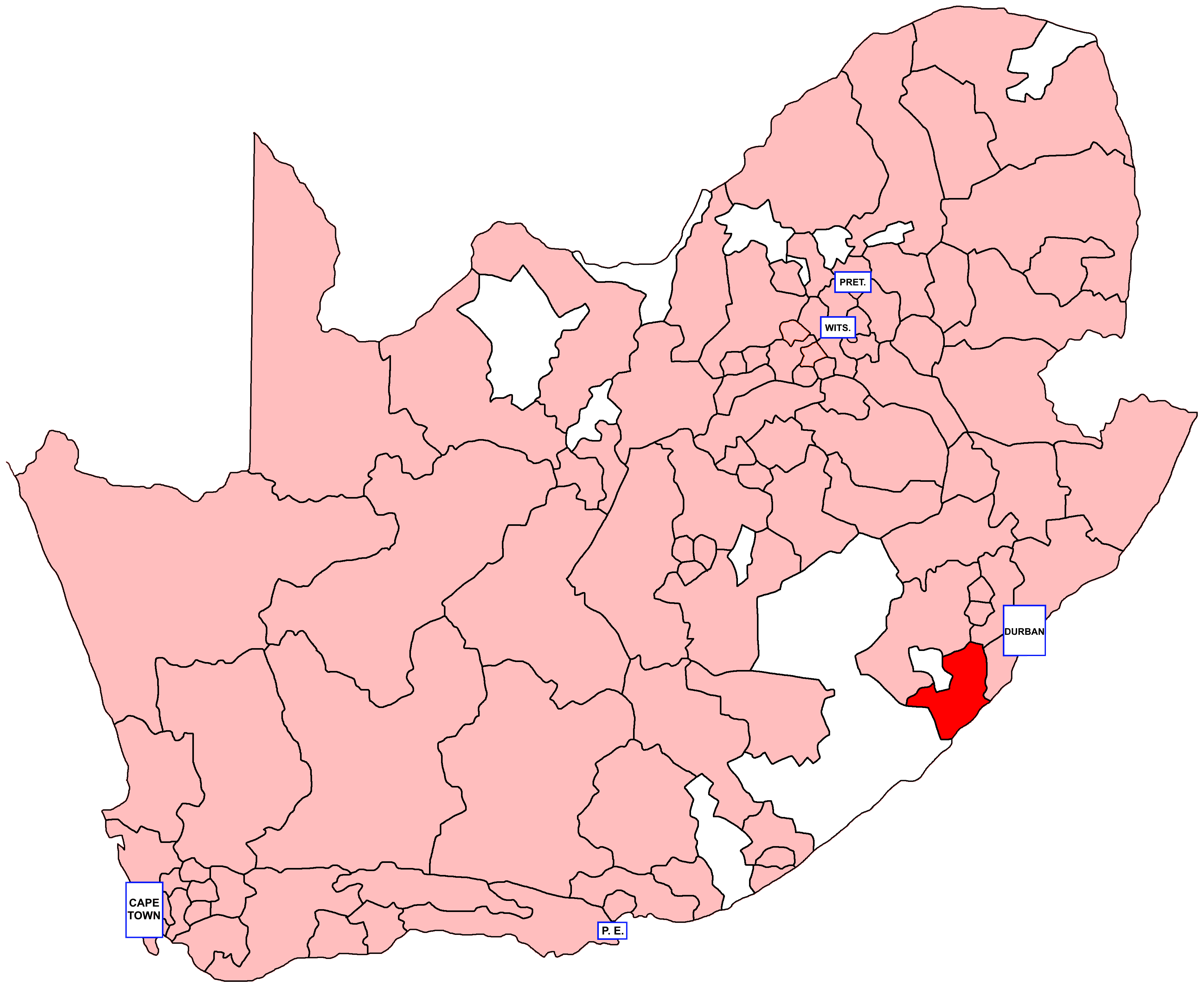
- Location of South Coast within South Africa (1981)
- Province: Natal

Former constituency
- Created: 1938
- Abolished: 1994
- Number of members: 1
- Replaced by: KwaZulu-Natal

South Coast was a constituency in the Natal Province of South Africa, which existed from 1938 to 1994. Named for the South Coast, throughout its existence it elected one member to the House of Assembly.

== Members ==
Election	Parliament	Member	Party	Ref.
1989	21st South African Parliament	Aubrey Gordon Thompson	NP	

== Election results ==
=== 1938 ===
General election 1938: South Coast
Party	Candidate	Votes	%	±%
Dominion	Charles Neate	2,460	53.0	New
United	D. E. Mitchell	2,158	46.5	New
Rejected ballots		27	0.5	N/A
Majority		302	6.5	N/A
Turnout		4,645	79.6	N/A
Dominion win (new seat)				
