= Aliwal (House of Assembly of South Africa constituency) =

- Former constituency for the South African House of Assembly
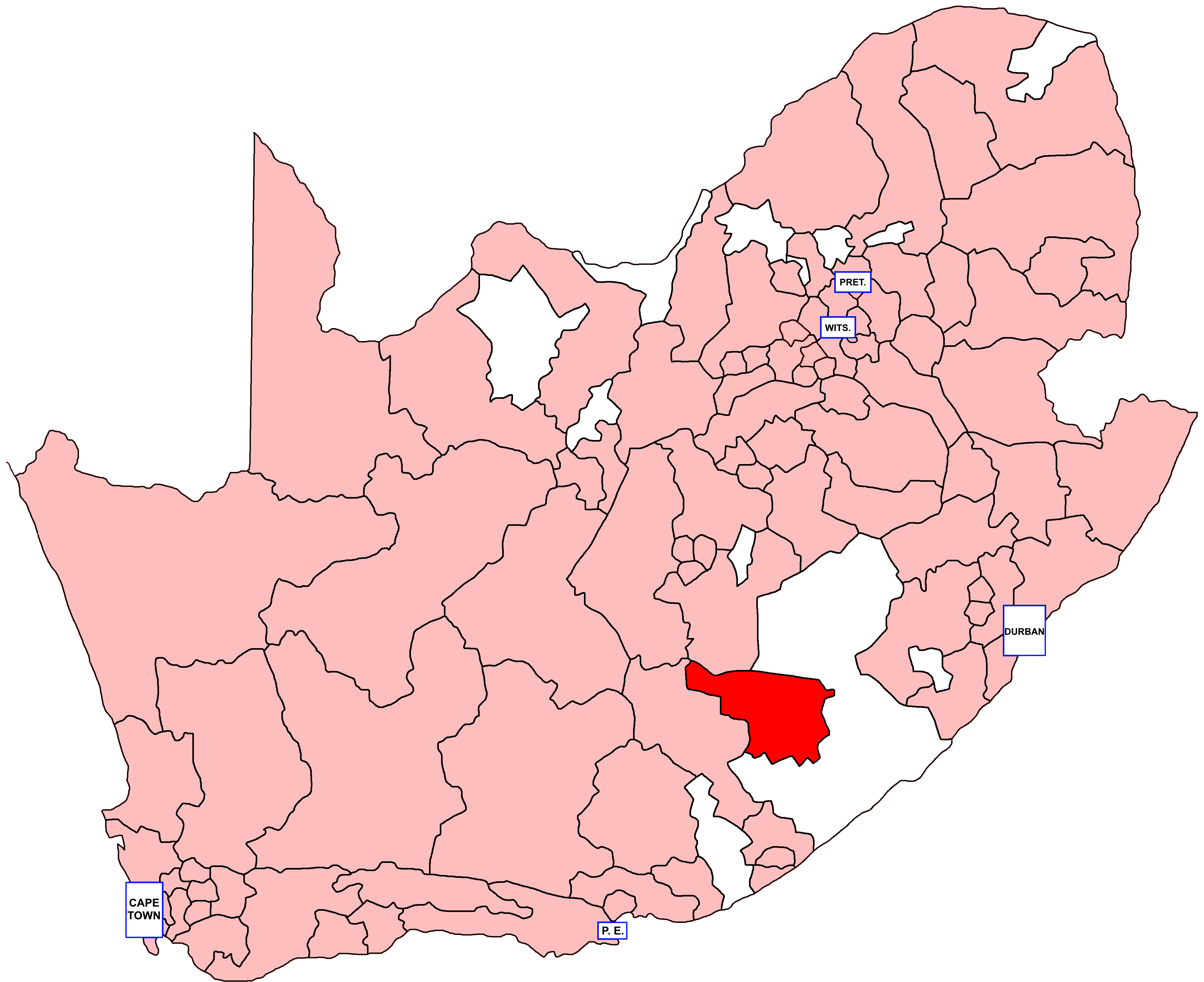
- Location of Aliwal within South Africa (1981)
- Province: Cape of Good Hope
- Electorate: 9,903 (1989)

Former constituency
- Created: 1910; 1924
- Abolished: 1920; 1994
- Number of members: 1
- Last MHA: J. F. Pretorius (NP)
- Created from: Albert-Aliwal (1924)
- Replaced by: Albert-Aliwal (1920); Eastern Cape (1994)

Aliwal was a constituency in the Cape Province of South Africa, which existed throughout the first-past-the-post era (1910 to 1994) with the exception of the 1920 and 1921 elections. Named after the town of Aliwal North, the seat covered a large rural area along the Cape’s northeastern frontier, bordering the Orange Free State province as well as Lesotho and, after its nominal independence in 1976, the Transkei bantustan. Throughout its existence it elected one member to the House of Assembly and one to the Cape Provincial Council.

== Franchise notes ==
When the Union of South Africa was formed in 1910, the electoral qualifications in use in each pre-existing colony were kept in place. The Cape Colony had implemented a “colour-blind” franchise known as the Cape Qualified Franchise, which included all adult literate men owning more than £75 worth of property (controversially raised from £25 in 1892), and this initially remained in effect after the colony became the Cape Province. As of 1908, 22,784 out of 152,221 electors in the Cape Colony were “Native or Coloured”. Eligibility to serve in Parliament and the Provincial Council, however, was restricted to whites from 1910 onward.

The first challenge to the Cape Qualified Franchise came with the Women's Enfranchisement Act, 1930 and the Franchise Laws Amendment Act, 1931, which extended the vote to women and removed property qualifications for the white population only – non-white voters remained subject to the earlier restrictions. In 1936, the Representation of Natives Act removed all black voters from the common electoral roll and introduced three “Native Representative Members”, white MPs elected by the black voters of the province and meant to represent their interests in particular. A similar provision was made for Coloured voters with the Separate Representation of Voters Act, 1951, and although this law was challenged by the courts, it went into effect in time for the 1958 general election, which was thus held with all-white voter rolls for the first time in South African history. The all-white franchise would continue until the end of apartheid and the introduction of universal suffrage in 1994.

== History ==
Like most rural seats, Aliwal was reliably conservative for most of its history. Throughout its first existence, the seat was held by the South African Party, which won it in 1910 when Jacobus Wilhelmus Sauer, a veteran of the pre-union Cape colonial government, was elected unopposed. Sauer died in 1913, and SAP candidate Stephanus Bekker won the seat in a by-election contested only by the independent candidate W. C. Orsmond. The SAP won again in 1915, with Constantine Alexander Schweizer representing the seat until its abolition in 1920. Following two elections consolidated with neighbouring Albert, Aliwal was recreated in 1924, and incumbent MHA C.A.A. Sephton won the seat narrowly over the National Party’s H.S. van Zyl. Sephton held the seat in 1929 and 1933, unopposed in the latter election, but in 1938 the Purified National Party captured it. Gert Hendrik Frans “Kappie” Strydom would go on to represent the seat until 1961, and all his successors in the seat were from the NP.

== Members ==
Election	Member	Party
1910	Jacobus Wilhelmus Sauer	South African
1913 by	S. Bekker	South African
1915	C. A. Schweizer	South African
1920	constituency abolished	

Election	Member	Party
1924	C. A. A. Sephton	South African
1929	C. A. A. Sephton	South African
1933	C. A. A. Sephton	South African
1933 by	A. M. la Grange	South African
1934	A. M. la Grange	United
1938	G. H. F. Strydom	GNP
1943	G. H. F. Strydom	HNP
1948	G. H. F. Strydom	HNP
1953	G. H. F. Strydom	National
1958	G. H. F. Strydom	National
1961	H. J. Botha	National
1966	H. J. Botha	National
1970	H. J. Botha	National
1974	J. W. Greeff	National
1977	J. W. Greeff	National
1981	J. W. Greeff	National
1987	J. F. Pretorius	National
1989	J. F. Pretorius	National
1994	constituency abolished	

== Detailed results ==
=== Elections in the 1910s ===
General election 1910: Aliwal
Party	Candidate	Votes	%	±%
South African	Jacobus Wilhelmus Sauer	Unopposed		
South African win (new seat)				

Aliwal by-election, 15 November 1913
Party	Candidate	Votes	%	±%
South African	S. Bekker	1,100	59.3	N/A
Independent	W. C. Orsmond	756	40.7	N/A
Majority		344	18.6	N/A
Turnout		1,856		N/A
South African hold		Swing	N/A	

General election 1915: Aliwal
Party	Candidate	Votes	%	±%
South African	C. A. Schweizer	1,405	64.7	N/A
National	H. S. van Zyl	768	35.3	New
Majority		637	29.4	N/A
Turnout		2,173	81.5	N/A
South African hold		Swing	N/A	

=== Elections in the 1920s ===
General election 1924: Aliwal
Party	Candidate	Votes	%	±%
South African	C. A. A. Sephton	1,553	52.5	New
National	H. S. van Zyl	1,381	46.6	New
Rejected ballots		27	0.9	N/A
Majority		172	5.9	N/A
Turnout		2,961	86.1	N/A
South African win (new seat)				

General election 1929: Aliwal
Party	Candidate	Votes	%	±%
South African	C. A. A. Sephton	1,518	51.3	−1.2
National	H. McKinnell	1,367	46.3	−0.3
Rejected ballots		69	2.4	+1.5
Majority		151	5.0	−0.9
Turnout		2,954	85.9	−0.2
South African hold		Swing	-0.5	

=== Elections in the 1930s ===
General election 1933: Aliwal
Party	Candidate	Votes	%	±%
South African	C. A. A. Sephton	Unopposed		
South African hold				

Aliwal by-election, 25 September 1933
Party	Candidate	Votes	%	±%
South African	A. M. la Grange	Unopposed		
South African hold				

General election 1938: Aliwal
Party	Candidate	Votes	%	±%
Purified National	G. H. F. Strydom	2,996	50.7	New
United	A. M. la Grange	2,858	48.4	N/A
Rejected ballots		55	0.9	N/A
Majority		138	2.3	N/A
Turnout		5,909	91.5	N/A
Purified National gain from United		Swing	N/A	

=== Elections in the 1940s ===
General election 1943: Aliwal
Party	Candidate	Votes	%	±%
Reunited National	G. H. F. Strydom	3,958	52.9	+1.7
United	D. E. S. Marais	3,523	47.1	−1.7
Majority		435	5.8	+3.4
Turnout		7,481	87.1	−3.5
Reunited National hold		Swing	+1.7	

General election 1948: Aliwal
Party	Candidate	Votes	%	±%
Reunited National	G. H. F. Strydom	5,017	58.0	+5.1
United	K. H. Hockley	3,632	42.0	−5.1
Majority		1,385	16.0	+3.4
Turnout		8,649	89.2	+2.1
Reunited National hold		Swing	+5.1	
