= Pietermaritzburg South (House of Assembly of South Africa constituency) =

Constituency in the Natal Province of South Africa

- Pietermaritzburg-Suid
- Former constituency for the South African House of Assembly
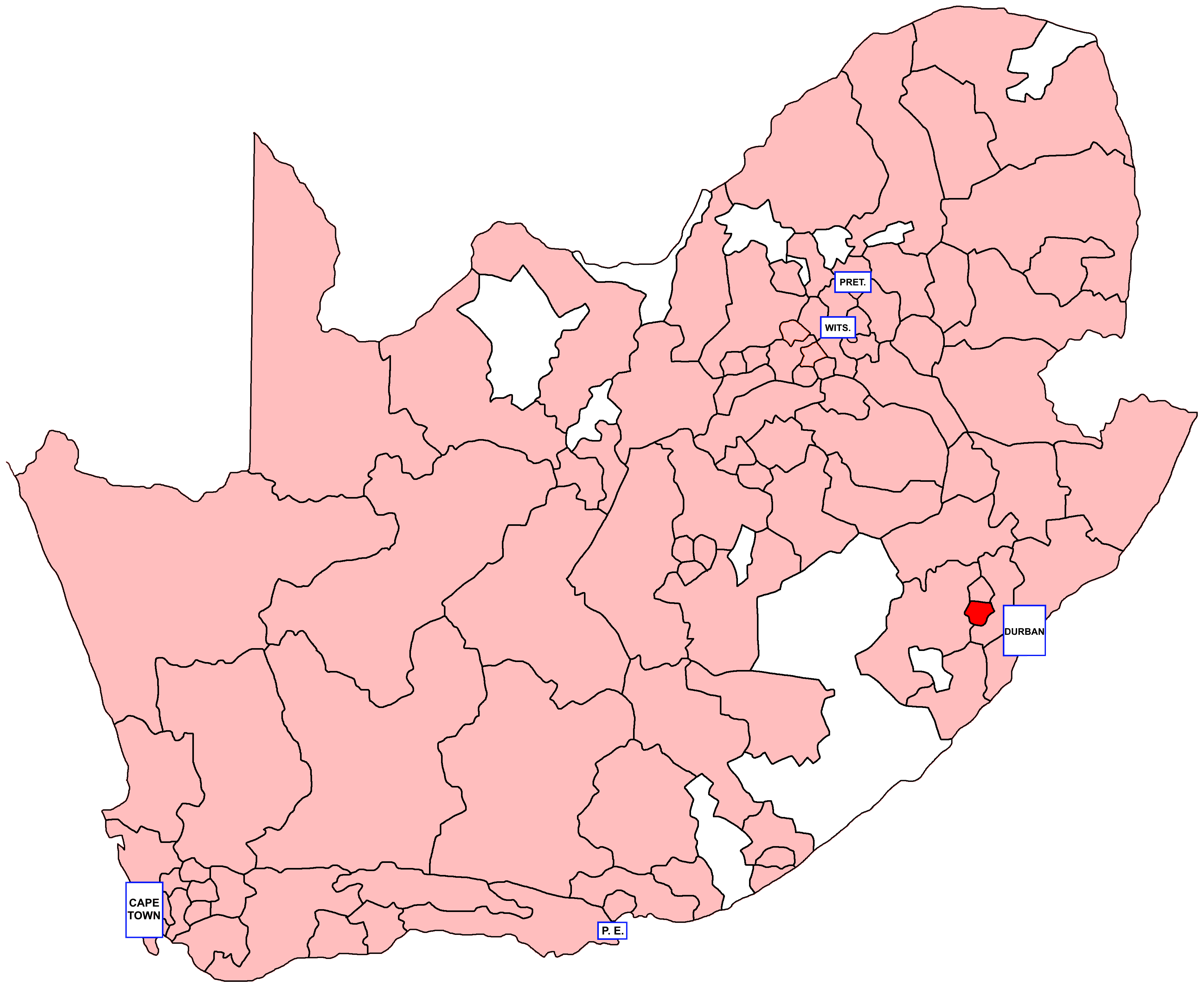
- Location of Pietermaritzburg South within South Africa (1981)
- Province: Natal
- Electorate: 21,499 (1989)

Former constituency
- Created: 1910; 1974
- Abolished: 1929; 1994
- Number of members: 1
- Last MHA: R. F. Haswell (DP)
- Created from: Pietermaritzburg; Pietermaritzburg District
- Replaced by: Pietermaritzburg District (1929); KwaZulu-Natal (1994)

Pietermaritzburg South (Afrikaans: Pietermaritzburg-Suid) was a constituency in the Natal Province of South Africa, which existed from 1910 to 1929 and again from 1974 to 1994. As the name implies, it covered the southern half of Pietermaritzburg, the provincial capital. Throughout its existence it elected one member to the House of Assembly.

== Franchise notes ==
When the Union of South Africa was formed in 1910, the electoral qualifications in use in each pre-existing colony were kept in place. The franchise used in the Natal Colony, while theoretically not restricted by race, was significantly less liberal than that of the Cape, and no more than a few hundred non-white electors ever qualified. In 1908, an estimated 200 of the 22,786 electors in the colony were of non-European descent, and by 1935, only one remained. By 1958, when the last non-white voters in the Cape were taken off the rolls, Natal too had an all-white electorate. The franchise was also restricted by property and education qualifications until the 1933 general election, following the passage of the Women's Enfranchisement Act, 1930 and the Franchise Laws Amendment Act, 1931. From then on, the franchise was given to all white citizens aged 21 or over, which remained the case until the end of apartheid and the introduction of universal suffrage in 1994.

== History ==
Despite its Afrikaans name, Pietermaritzburg's white population (and consequently, its pre-1994 electorate) is predominantly English-speaking, and like the rest of Natal, its politics were largely supportive of the pro-British side of South African politics. Its first MP, William Henry Griffin, was elected as an independent (Natal having had no party system before unification), but stood for re-election in 1915 for the Labour Party. He lost, however, and the constituency would be represented by the South African Party for the remainder of its first iteration - from 1918 onwards, by a single man, William John O'Brien, who moved to the newly created Pietermaritzburg District constituency when Pietermaritzburg South was abolished in 1929.

The city of Pietermaritzburg formed a single constituency until 1974, when it and the surrounding Pietermaritzburg District were reconfigured, resurrecting Pietermaritzburg North and South as larger urban-rural hybrid seats. Where Pietermaritzburg had been a safe seat for the opposition United Party, the two new seats were considerably more marginal - although this was partially due to the UP's general decline in the era. In its second iteration, Pietermaritzburg South changed hands at every election. Its inaugural election in 1974 saw a straight contest between former Pietermaritzburg District MP Warwick Trollip Webber and H. B. Klopper of the governing National Party, which Webber won handily. He stood down at the next general election, at which point the UP had dissolved into liberal and conservative factions - the conservative faction, the New Republic Party, contested and won Pietermaritzburg South against an NP opponent. In 1981, in a three-cornered race, the liberal Progressive Federal Party took the seat with Michael Ashton Tarr, who lost it to the Nationals again in 1987. In 1989, the newly created Democratic Party, which reunified the PFP with parts of the NRP and some liberal defectors from the governing party, successfully took both Pietermaritzburg seats back, and held them until the first non-racial elections in 1994.

== Members ==
Election	Member	Party
1910	W. H. Griffin	Independent
1915	R. A. Buntine	South African
1918 by	W. J. O'Brien	South African
1920	W. J. O'Brien	South African
1921	W. J. O'Brien	South African
1924	W. J. O'Brien	South African
1929	Constituency abolished	

Election	Member	Party
1974	W. T. Webber	United
1977	G. de Jong	NRP
1981	M. A. Tarr	PFP
1987	B. V. Edwards	National
1989	R. F. Haswell	Democratic
1994	Constituency abolished	

== Detailed results ==
=== Elections in the 1910s ===
General election 1910: Pietermaritzburg South
Party	Candidate	Votes	%	±%
Independent	W. H. Griffin	519	38.2	New
Independent	C. Yonge	357	26.3	New
Independent	M. O'Meara	290	21.4	New
Socialist	R. Shaw	119	8.8	New
Unionist	L. H. Green	72	5.3	New
Majority		162	8.9	N/A
Independent win (new seat)				

General election 1915: Pietermaritzburg South
Party	Candidate	Votes	%	±%
South African	R. A. Buntine	868	67.2	New
Labour	W. H. Griffin	424	32.8	−5.4
Majority		444	34.4	N/A
Turnout		1,292	67.6	N/A
South African gain from Labour		Swing	N/A	

Pietermaritzburg South by-election, 22 November 1918
Party	Candidate	Votes	%	±%
South African	W. J. O'Brien	654	46.3	−20.9
Labour	T. G. Strachan	384	27.1	−5.7
Unionist	P. H. Taylor	375	26.5	New
Majority		270	19.2	−15.2
Turnout		1,413	58.8	−8.8
South African hold		Swing	-7.6	

=== Elections in the 1920s ===
General election 1920: Pietermaritzburg South
Party	Candidate	Votes	%	±%
South African	W. J. O'Brien	891	67.8	+0.6
Labour	W. Cox	424	32.2	−0.6
Majority		467	35.6	+1.2
Turnout		1,315	60.5	−7.1
South African hold		Swing	+0.6	

General election 1921: Pietermaritzburg South
Party	Candidate	Votes	%	±%
South African	W. J. O'Brien	Unopposed		
South African hold				

General election 1924: Pietermaritzburg South
Party	Candidate	Votes	%	±%
South African	W. J. O'Brien	1,000	68.3	N/A
Labour	G. Stobie	446	30.5	New
Rejected ballots		18	0.8	N/A
Majority		554	37.8	N/A
Turnout		1,464	81.0	N/A
South African hold		Swing	N/A	
