= Pretoria Central (House of Assembly of South Africa constituency) =

South African constituency, 1915–1994

- Pretoria-Sentraal
- Former constituency for the South African House of Assembly
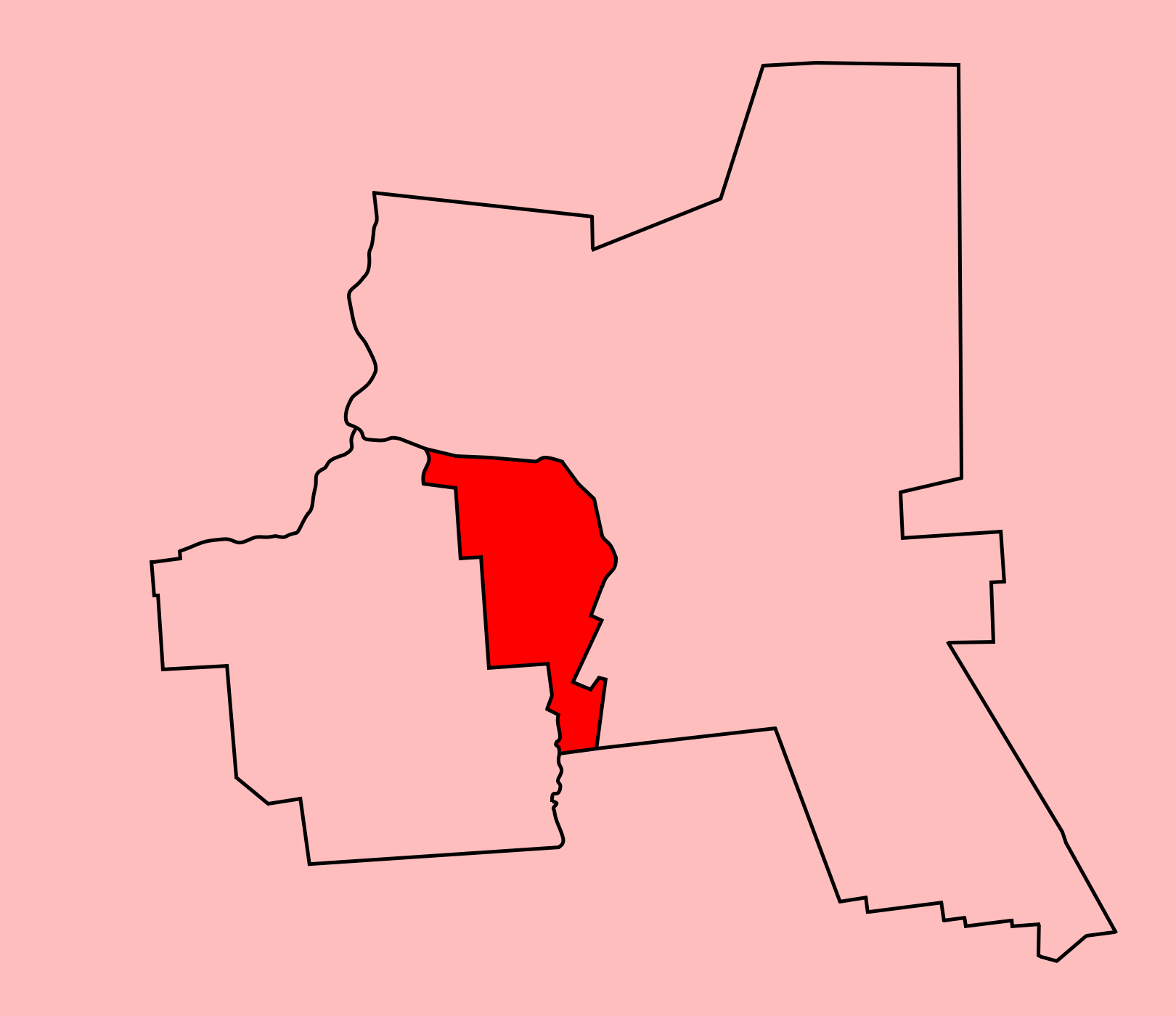
- Location of Pretoria Central within Pretoria (1915)
- Province: Transvaal
- Electorate: 18,882 (1989)

Former constituency
- Created: 1915
- Abolished: 1994
- Number of members: 1
- Last MHA: Gert Oosthuizen (NP)
- Replaced by: Gauteng

Pretoria Central (Afrikaans: Pretoria-Sentraal) was a constituency in the Transvaal Province of South Africa, which existed from 1915 to 1994. It covered the city centre of Pretoria, the administrative capital of South Africa. Throughout its existence it elected one member to the House of Assembly and one to the Transvaal Provincial Council.

== Franchise notes ==
When the Union of South Africa was formed in 1910, the electoral qualifications in use in each pre-existing colony were kept in place. In the Transvaal Colony, and its predecessor the South African Republic, the vote was restricted to white men, and as such, elections in the Transvaal Province were held on a whites-only franchise from the beginning. The franchise was also restricted by property and education qualifications until the 1933 general election, following the passage of the Women's Enfranchisement Act, 1930 and the Franchise Laws Amendment Act, 1931. From then on, the franchise was given to all white citizens aged 21 or over. Non-whites remained disenfranchised until the end of apartheid and the introduction of universal suffrage in 1994.

== History ==
Pretoria Central was first created in 1915, as part of a general increase in representation for the Transvaal. It was the third constituency in Pretoria, alongside Pretoria West and East, and several others would be created over the years. Its first MP, Edward Rooth, was elected for the Unionist Party, but defected to the governing South African Party well ahead of the parties' formal merger. From then until 1948, the seat generally favoured the SAP and its successor, the United Party, but the Herenigde Nasionale Party captured the seat in 1948 as part of their nationwide victory. The NP held the seat for the remainder of its existence, in spite of challenges from the UP in the early years and the Conservative Party towards the end. Its final MP, Gert Oosthuizen, had a long political career after the end of apartheid, eventually joining the ANC and serving as a deputy minister until 2019.

== Members ==
Election	Member	Party
1915	Edward Rooth	Unionist
1920	Edward Rooth	South African
1921	Edward Rooth	South African
1924	Charles Te Water	National
1929	P. V. Pocock	South African
1933	P. V. Pocock	South African
1934	P. V. Pocock	United
1938	P. V. Pocock	United
1943	E. P. Pieterse	United
1948	D. J. G. van den Heever	HNP
1953	D. J. G. van den Heever	National
1958	D. J. G. van den Heever	National
1961	D. J. G. van den Heever	National
1966	D. J. G. van den Heever	National
1970	D. J. L. Nel	National
1974	D. J. L. Nel	National
1977	D. J. L. Nel	National
1981	D. J. L. Nel	National
1987	Gert Oosthuizen	National
1989	Gert Oosthuizen	National
1994	constituency abolished	

== Detailed results ==
=== Elections in the 1910s ===
General election 1915: Pretoria Central
Party	Candidate	Votes	%	±%
Unionist	Edward Rooth	1,182	61.7	New
National	L. E. Brandt	416	21.7	New
Labour	M. G. Nicholson	318	16.6	New
Majority		766	40.0	N/A
Turnout		1,916	77.4	N/A
Unionist win (new seat)				

=== Elections in the 1920s ===
General election 1920: Pretoria Central
Party	Candidate	Votes	%	±%
South African	Edward Rooth	1,263	59.2	−2.5
National	H. Reitz	551	25.8	+4.1
Labour	P. M. van Leer	320	15.0	−1.6
Independent	R. A. Kerr	2	0.1	New
Majority		712	33.4	−6.6
Turnout		2,136	63.6	−13.8
South African hold		Swing	-3.3	

General election 1921: Pretoria Central
Party	Candidate	Votes	%	±%
South African	Edward Rooth	Unopposed		
South African hold				

General election 1924: Pretoria Central
Party	Candidate	Votes	%	±%
National	Charles te Water	1,163	50.9	New
South African	Edward Rooth	1,110	48.6	N/A
Rejected ballots		10	0.5	N/A
Majority		53	1.3	N/A
Turnout		2,283	83.2	N/A
National gain from South African		Swing	N/A	

General election 1929: Pretoria Central
Party	Candidate	Votes	%	±%
South African	P. V. Pocock	1,539	54.5	+5.9
National	Charles te Water	1,276	45.2	−5.7
Rejected ballots		9	0.3	-0.2
Majority		263	9.3	N/A
Turnout		2,824	81.9	−1.3
South African gain from National		Swing	+5.8	

=== Elections in the 1930s ===
General election 1933: Pretoria Central
Party	Candidate	Votes	%	±%
South African	P. V. Pocock	Unopposed		
South African hold				

General election 1938: Pretoria Central
Party	Candidate	Votes	%	±%
United	P. V. Pocock	3,667	78.8	N/A
Dominion	M. R. Atteridge	949	20.4	New
Rejected ballots		37	0.8	N/A
Majority		2,718	58.4	N/A
Turnout		4,653	67.9	N/A
United hold		Swing	N/A	
