= Griqualand East (House of Assembly of South Africa constituency) =

South African constituency, 1910–1994

- Griekwaland-Oos
- Former constituency for the South African House of Assembly
- Province: Cape of Good Hope
- Electorate: 7,226 (1943)

Former constituency
- Created: 1910
- Abolished: 1948
- Number of members: 1
- Last MHA: R. M. Fawcett (UP)
- Replaced by: Transkeian Territories

Griqualand East (Afrikaans: Griekwaland-Oos), known simply as Griqualand (Afrikaans: Griekwaland) prior to 1938, was a constituency in the Cape Province of South Africa, which existed from 1910 to 1948. It covered the area of the Cape east of the Mthatha River, and was largely coterminous with its namesake former colony. Throughout its existence it elected one member to the House of Assembly and one to the Cape Provincial Council.

== Franchise notes ==
When the Union of South Africa was formed in 1910, the electoral qualifications in use in each pre-existing colony were kept in place. The Cape Colony had implemented a “colour-blind” franchise known as the Cape Qualified Franchise, which included all adult literate men owning more than £75 worth of property (controversially raised from £25 in 1892), and this initially remained in effect after the colony became the Cape Province. As of 1908, 22,784 out of 152,221 electors in the Cape Colony were “Native or Coloured”. Eligibility to serve in Parliament and the Provincial Council, however, was restricted to whites from 1910 onward.

The first challenge to the Cape Qualified Franchise came with the Women's Enfranchisement Act, 1930 and the Franchise Laws Amendment Act, 1931, which extended the vote to women and removed property qualifications for the white population only – non-white voters remained subject to the earlier restrictions. In 1936, the Representation of Natives Act removed all black voters from the common electoral roll and introduced three “Native Representative Members”, white MPs elected by the black voters of the province and meant to represent their interests in particular. A similar provision was made for Coloured voters with the Separate Representation of Voters Act, 1951, and although this law was challenged by the courts, it went into effect in time for the 1958 general election, which was thus held with all-white voter rolls for the first time in South African history. The all-white franchise would continue until the end of apartheid and the introduction of universal suffrage in 1994.

== History ==
Griqualand East’s electorate, as with most of the Eastern Cape, was largely English-speaking and loyal to the pro-British side of South African politics. With the exception of the 1933 election, in which incumbent MP L. D. Gilson lost the seat to an independent challenger, the main pro-British party in South Africa (first the Unionists, then the SAP, and after Gilson’s return to the seat in 1934, the United Party) held Griqualand East in every election in which it was contested. When it was abolished in 1948, Griqualand East was largely replaced by the new seat of Transkeian Territories, which continued to be held by the UP throughout its existence.

== Members ==
Election	Member	Party
1910	J. G. King	Unionist
1915	J. G. King	Unionist
1920	J. G. King	Unionist
1921	J. G. King	SAP
1924	L. D. Gilson	SAP
1929	L. D. Gilson	SAP
1933	C. W. Gray	Independent
1934 by	L. D. Gilson	SAP
1934	L. D. Gilson	United
1938	L. D. Gilson	United
1943	R. M. Fawcett	United
1948	constituency abolished	

== Detailed results ==
=== Elections in the 1910s ===
General election 1910: Griqualand
Party	Candidate	Votes	%	±%
Unionist	J. G. King	877	56.5	New
Independent	C. E. Todd	675	43.5	New
Majority		202	13.0	N/A
Unionist win (new seat)				

General election 1915: Griqualand
Party	Candidate	Votes	%	±%
Unionist	J. G. King	1,718	84.2	+27.7
National	A. van Zijl	323	15.8	New
Majority		1,395	68.4	N/A
Turnout		2,041	64.8	N/A
Unionist hold		Swing	N/A	

=== Elections in the 1920s ===
General election 1920: Griqualand
Party	Candidate	Votes	%	±%
Unionist	J. G. King	941	50.8	−33.4
South African	C. E. Todd	912	49.2	New
Majority		29	1.6	N/A
Turnout		1,853	54.6	−10.2
Unionist hold		Swing	N/A	

General election 1921: Griqualand
Party	Candidate	Votes	%	±%
South African	J. G. King	1,731	79.0	+29.8
National	T. I. Gavett	459	21.0	New
Majority		1,272	58.0	N/A
Turnout		2,190	62.3	+7.7
South African hold		Swing	N/A	

General election 1924: Griqualand
Party	Candidate	Votes	%	±%
South African	L. D. Gilson	1,160	53.9	−25.1
Independent	C. E. Tod	971	45.1	New
Rejected ballots		23	1.0	N/A
Majority		189	8.8	N/A
Turnout		2,154	60.3	−2.0
South African hold		Swing	N/A	

General election 1929: Griqualand
Party	Candidate	Votes	%	±%
South African	L. D. Gilson	1,839	77.2	+23.3
National	M. M. Heyns	507	21.3	New
Rejected ballots		37	1.5	+0.5
Majority		1,332	55.9	N/A
Turnout		2,383	73.6	+13.6
South African hold		Swing	N/A	

=== Elections in the 1930s ===
General election 1933: Griqualand
Party	Candidate	Votes	%	±%
Independent	C. W. Gray	2,139	54.5	New
South African	L. D. Gilson	1,733	44.1	−33.1
Rejected ballots		54	1.4	-0.1
Majority		406	10.3	N/A
Turnout		3,926	76.7	+3.1
Independent gain from South African		Swing	N/A	

Griqualand by-election, 24 April 1934
Party	Candidate	Votes	%	±%
South African	L. D. Gilson	Unopposed		
South African gain from Independent				

General election 1938: Griqualand East
Party	Candidate	Votes	%	±%
United	L. D. Gilson	2,969	63.7	+19.6
Independent	J. J. Gray	1,628	34.9	New
Rejected ballots		66	1.4	+-0
Majority		1,341	28.8	N/A
Turnout		4,663	71.5	−5.2
United gain from Independent		Swing	N/A	
