= Johannesburg West (House of Assembly of South Africa constituency) =

South African constituency, 1938–1994

- Johannesburg-Wes
- Former constituency for the South African House of Assembly
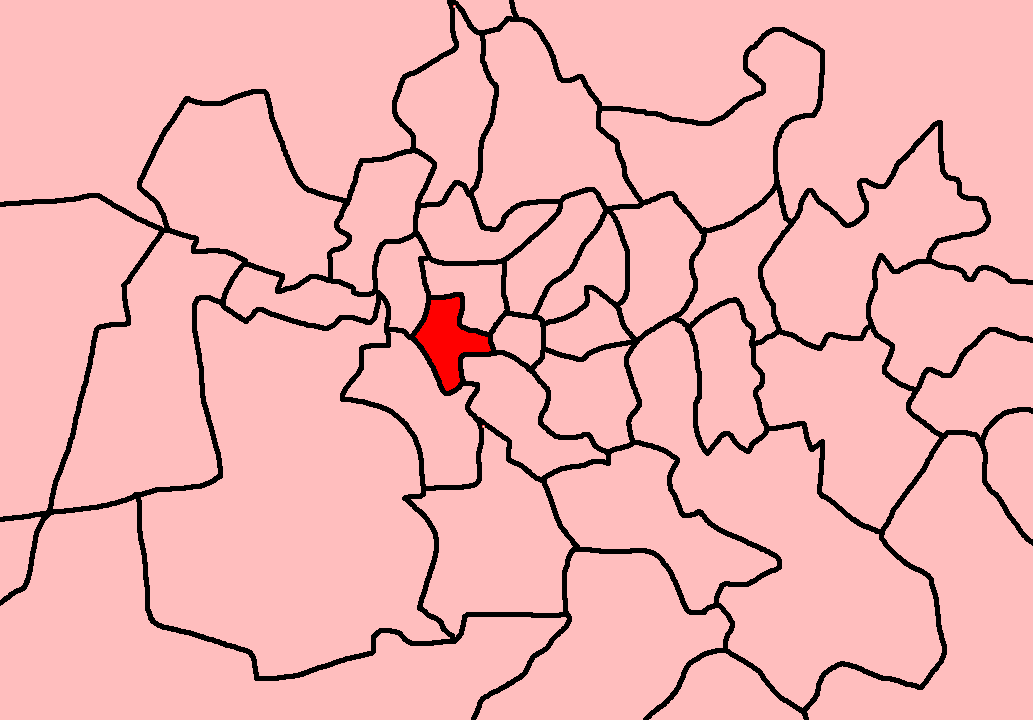
- Location of Johannesburg West within the Witwatersrand (1981)
- Province: Transvaal
- Electorate: 18,187 (1989)

Former constituency
- Created: 1938; 1966
- Abolished: 1953; 1994
- Number of members: 1
- Last MHA: Roelf Meyer (NP)
- Replaced by: Florida (1953); Gauteng (1994)

Johannesburg West (Afrikaans: Johannesburg-Wes) was a constituency in the Transvaal Province of South Africa, which existed from 1938 to 1953 and again from 1966 to 1994. It covered various areas in the western suburbs of Johannesburg. Throughout its existence it elected one member to the House of Assembly and one to the Transvaal Provincial Council.

== Franchise notes ==
When the Union of South Africa was formed in 1910, the electoral qualifications in use in each pre-existing colony were kept in place. In the Transvaal Colony, and its predecessor the South African Republic, the vote was restricted to white men, and as such, elections in the Transvaal Province were held on a whites-only franchise from the beginning. The franchise was also restricted by property and education qualifications until the 1933 general election, following the passage of the Women's Enfranchisement Act, 1930 and the Franchise Laws Amendment Act, 1931. From then on, the franchise was given to all white citizens aged 21 or over. Non-whites remained disenfranchised until the end of apartheid and the introduction of universal suffrage in 1994.

== History ==
Johannesburg West existed in two non-consecutive periods, and its political alignment was quite different between the two. In its first iteration, it was strongly marginal, but with a slight lean towards the United Party, which held it throughout the period - notably, in 1943, future cabinet minister Ben Schoeman was defeated in his bid for the seat. His opponent, Sarel Tighy, represented Johannesburg West until the seat's abolition in 1953, whereupon he moved to the newly-created seat of Florida.

The constituency was recreated in 1966, when the House was expanded from 150 to 160 members, and in this new iteration it was safe for the governing National Party. Its first MP, former Westdene representative and cabinet minister Johannes Petrus van der Spuy, left the seat after less than a year to take up the position of Ambassador to Austria. Every subsequent MP for Johannesburg West also served in cabinet: Carel de Wet and Dawie de Villiers both resigned in mid-term to become Ambassador to London, and de Villiers only held ministerial office following his return, when he became MP for Piketberg. However, his successor, Roelf Meyer, would become one of F. W. de Klerk's closest allies, and served as the NP's chief negotiator in the Multiparty Negotiating Forum during 1993 and 1994. He stayed in politics after the end of apartheid, co-founding the United Democratic Movement in 1997.

== Members ==
Election	Member	Party
1938	B. H. Lindhorst	United
1943	S. J. Tighy	United
1948	S. J. Tighy	United
1953	constituency abolished	

Election	Member	Party
1966	J. P. van der Spuy	National
1967 by	Carel de Wet	National
1970	Carel de Wet	National
1972 by	Dawie de Villiers	National
1974	Dawie de Villiers	National
1977	Dawie de Villiers	National
1979 by	Roelf Meyer	National
1981	Roelf Meyer	National
1987	Roelf Meyer	National
1989	Roelf Meyer	National
1994	constituency abolished	

== Detailed results ==
=== Elections in the 1930s ===
General election 1938: Johannesburg West
Party	Candidate	Votes	%	±%
United	B. H. Lindhorst	2,959	43.9	New
Purified National	C. W. M. du Toit	2,487	36.9	New
Labour	M. J. du Plessis	942	14.0	New
Independent	S. F. du Toit	316	4.7	New
Rejected ballots		42	0.6	N/A
Majority		472	7.0	N/A
Turnout		6,746	72.7	N/A
United win (new seat)				
