= Port Elizabeth District (House of Assembly of South Africa constituency) =

- Port Elizabeth-Distrik
- Former constituency for the South African House of Assembly
- Province: Cape of Good Hope
- Electorate: 11,522 (1948)

Former constituency
- Created: 1938
- Abolished: 1953
- Number of members: 1
- Last MHA: G. N. Hayward (UP)
- Replaced by: Port Elizabeth West

Port Elizabeth District (Afrikaans: Port Elizabeth-Distrik) was a constituency in the Cape Province of South Africa, which existed from 1938 to 1953. As the name indicates, the seat covered a rural area surrounding Port Elizabeth (now Gqeberha). Throughout its existence it elected one member to the House of Assembly and one to the Cape Provincial Council.

== Franchise notes ==
When the Union of South Africa was formed in 1910, the electoral qualifications in use in each pre-existing colony were kept in place. The Cape Colony had implemented a "colour-blind" franchise known as the Cape Qualified Franchise, which included all adult literate men owning more than £75 worth of property (controversially raised from £25 in 1892), and this initially remained in effect after the colony became the Cape Province. As of 1908, 22,784 out of 152,221 electors in the Cape Colony were "Native or Coloured". Eligibility to serve in Parliament and the Provincial Council, however, was restricted to whites from 1910 onward.

The first challenge to the Cape Qualified Franchise came with the Women's Enfranchisement Act, 1930 and the Franchise Laws Amendment Act, 1931, which extended the vote to women and removed property qualifications for the white population only – non-white voters remained subject to the earlier restrictions. In 1936, the Representation of Natives Act removed all black voters from the common electoral roll and introduced three "Native Representative Members", white MPs elected by the black voters of the province and meant to represent their interests in particular. A similar provision was made for Coloured voters with the Separate Representation of Voters Act, 1951, and although this law was challenged by the courts, it went into effect in time for the 1958 general election, which was thus held with all-white voter rolls for the first time in South African history. The all-white franchise would continue until the end of apartheid and the introduction of universal suffrage in 1994.

== History ==
Like the rest of the Eastern Cape, Port Elizabeth South had a largely English-speaking electorate and was a stronghold of the pro-British side of South African politics. It was represented throughout its existence by a single MP: George Nathaniel Hayward, who was elected for the United Party at the seat's inaugural election in 1938 and held it at the subsequent two general elections, by a very safe margin in 1943 and then more narrowly in 1948. The constituency was abolished for the 1953 general election, and Hayward stood for and won the new seat of Port Elizabeth West, which he would represent for one five-year term.

== Members ==
Election	Member	Party
1938	G. N. Hayward	United
1943	G. N. Hayward	United
1948	G. N. Hayward	United
1953	constituency abolished	

== Detailed results ==
=== Elections in the 1930s ===
General election 1938: Port Elizabeth District
Party	Candidate	Votes	%	±%
United	G. N. Hayward	3,203	49.2	New
Purified National	D. Hay	2,705	41.5	New
Independent	C. A. Retief	573	8.8	New
Rejected ballots		32	0.5	N/A
Majority		498	7.6	N/A
Turnout		6,513	83.4	N/A
United win (new seat)				
