= Charles Stallard =

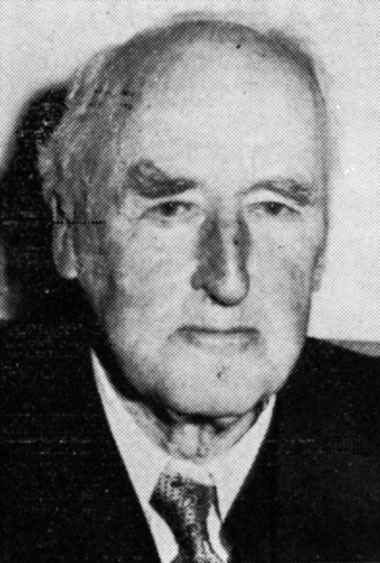
Charles Stallard

Colonel The Honourable Charles Frampton Stallard QC DSO MC (4 June 1871 – 13 June 1971) was a South African lawyer, soldier and politician.

Born in London, Stallard attended Merton College, Oxford, graduating in 1893. He was called to the English Bar by Gray's Inn in 1895. He subsequently went to South Africa and fought in the Second Boer War, serving with the City Imperial Volunteers and Paget's Horse. After the war he became an advocate in Johannesburg, from 1902; he was made King's Counsel in 1910.

During the First World War, he served on the staff of General Louis Botha in South West Africa (in 1914–15), later in Flanders (where he was wounded), and Italy. Stallard was thrice mentioned in dispatches and was awarded the DSO and MC.

Stallard's political career included being a member of the Transvaal Provincial Council in 1910. He was the Member of Parliament (MP) for Roodepoort 1929–38 and Maritzburg District 1939–1948 when he retired. He was a member of the South African Party until 1934, when he declined to support the fusion with the National Party to form the United Party.

Stallard was the leader of the Dominion Party of South Africa from 1933 until 1948. During the Second World War he was Minister of Mines in the cabinet of Jan Smuts.

Between 1937 and 1971 Stallard was Honorary Colonel of the Witwatersrand Rifles Regiment. He died on 13 June 1971, nine days after his 100th birthday.
