= Pietermaritzburg North (House of Assembly of South Africa constituency) =

- Pietermaritzburg-Noord
- Former constituency for the South African House of Assembly
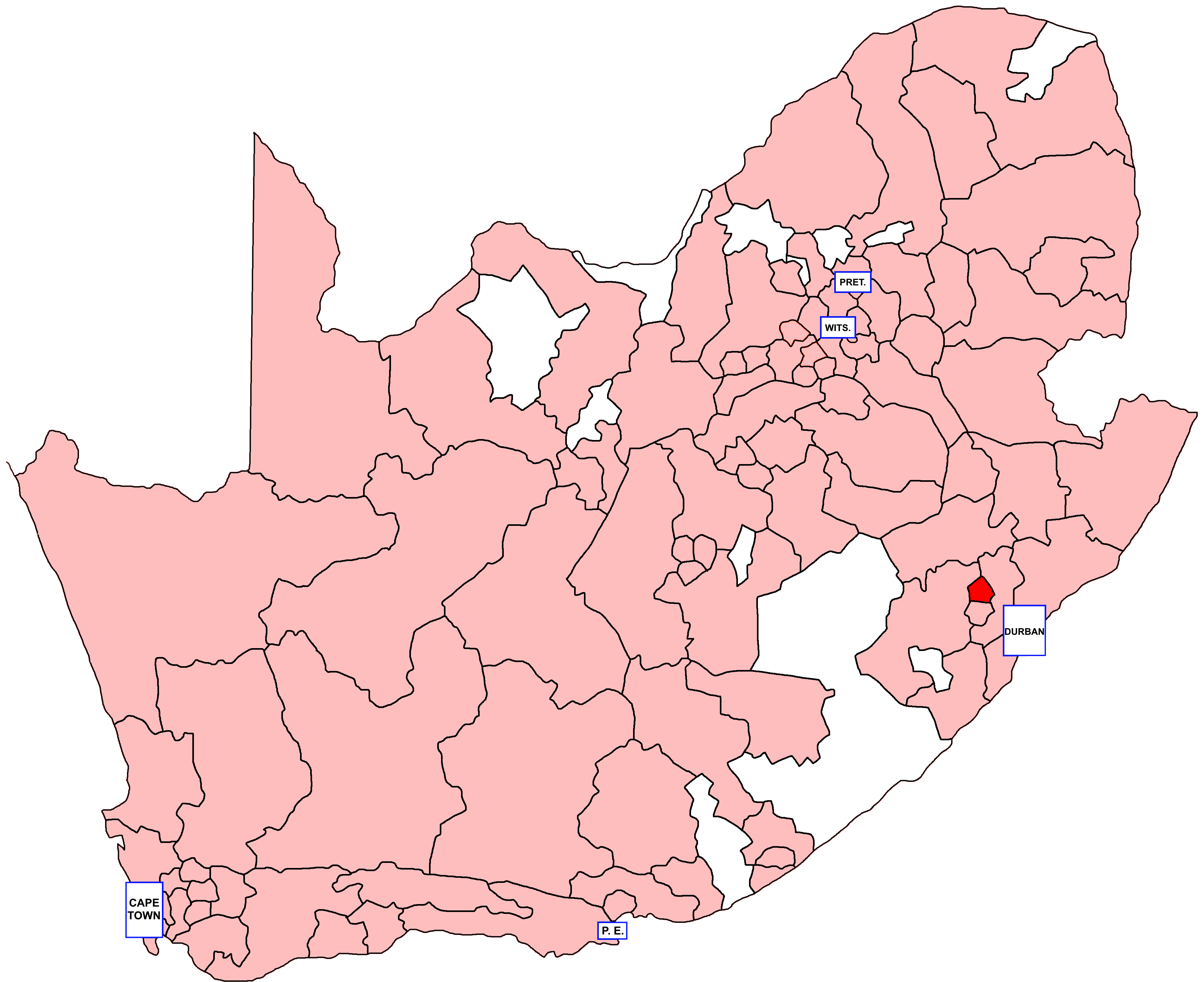
- Location of Pietermaritzburg North within South Africa (1981)
- Province: Natal
- Electorate: 18,886 (1989)

Former constituency
- Created: 1910; 1974
- Abolished: 1938; 1994
- Number of members: 1
- Last MHA: M. A. Tarr (DP)
- Created from: Pietermaritzburg; Pietermaritzburg District
- Replaced by: Pietermaritzburg (1938); KwaZulu-Natal (1994)

Pietermaritzburg North (Afrikaans: Pietermaritzburg-Noord) was a constituency in the Natal Province of South Africa, which existed from 1910 to 1938 and again from 1974 to 1994. As the name implies, it covered the northern half of Pietermaritzburg, the provincial capital. Throughout its existence it elected one member to the House of Assembly.

== Franchise notes ==
When the Union of South Africa was formed in 1910, the electoral qualifications in use in each pre-existing colony were kept in place. The franchise used in the Natal Colony, while theoretically not restricted by race, was significantly less liberal than that of the Cape, and no more than a few hundred non-white electors ever qualified. In 1908, an estimated 200 of the 22,786 electors in the colony were of non-European descent, and by 1935, only one remained. By 1958, when the last non-white voters in the Cape were taken off the rolls, Natal too had an all-white electorate. The franchise was also restricted by property and education qualifications until the 1933 general election, following the passage of the Women's Enfranchisement Act, 1930 and the Franchise Laws Amendment Act, 1931. From then on, the franchise was given to all white citizens aged 21 or over, which remained the case until the end of apartheid and the introduction of universal suffrage in 1994.

== History ==
Despite its Afrikaans name, Pietermaritzburg's white population (and consequently, its pre-1994 electorate) is predominantly English-speaking, and like the rest of Natal, its politics were largely supportive of the pro-British side of South African politics. Pietermaritzburg North, at least early in its history, tended to be the more left-leaning part of the city, and was one of few non-metropolitan constituencies ever to elect a Labour MP - Thomas Gillately Strachan, who defeated incumbent MP and Minister of Finance Thomas Orr in 1920 and represented the seat until 1929. In that year, with the Labour Party split down the middle, Strachan was defeated for re-election by the SAP's William Arthur Deane, formerly MP for Umvoti, who went on to serve until the seat's abolition in 1938. At that point he stood for and won the new unified seat of Pietermaritzburg, which he would represent for another five-year term.

Pietermaritzburg continued as a single constituency until 1974, when it and the surrounding Pietermaritzburg District were reconfigured, resurrecting Pietermaritzburg North and South as larger urban-rural hybrid seats. Where Pietermaritzburg had been a safe seat for the opposition United Party, the two new seats were considerably more marginal - although this was partially due to the UP's general decline in the era. In its second iteration, Pietermaritzburg North changed hands at every election. On its recreation in 1974, it saw a fierce three-cornered contest between the UP, the governing National Party, and Theo Gerdener, a former NP cabinet minister and MP for nearby Klip River, who had broken away from the governing party to found his own moderate-reformist Democratic Party. While Gerdener did better than any other candidate from his party, he still lost, and the DP later merged with the conservative faction of the UP to form the New Republic Party. This new party faced off against the Progressive Federal Party (the liberal faction of the UP, merged with the former Progressive Party) and the NP in 1977, creating essentially the same three sides as in 1974, but this time, the NP won the seat. Its new MP, Daniel Pieter Antonie Schutte, was defeated for re-election in 1981 by the PFP's Graham Brian Douglas McIntosh, but returned in 1987 in a straight rematch. In 1989, the newly-created Democratic Party, which reunified the PFP with parts of the NRP and some liberal defectors from the governing party, successfully took both Pietermaritzburg seats back, and held them until the first non-racial elections in 1994.

== Members ==
Election	Member	Party
1910	Thomas Orr	Independent
1915	Thomas Orr	South African
1920	T. G. Strachan	Labour
1921	T. G. Strachan	Labour
1924	T. G. Strachan	Labour
1929	W. A. Deane	South African
1933	W. A. Deane	South African
1934	W. A. Deane	United
1938	Constituency abolished	

Election	Member	Party
1974	G. W. Mills	United
1977	D. P. A. Schutte	National
1981	G. B. D. McIntosh	PFP
1987	D. P. A. Schutte	National
1989	M. A. Tarr	Democratic
1994	Constituency abolished	

== Detailed results ==
=== Elections in the 1910s ===
General election 1910: Pietermaritzburg North
Party	Candidate	Votes	%	±%
Independent	Thomas Orr	871	60.2	New
Labour	N. Palmer	576	39.8	New
Majority		295	20.4	N/A
Independent win (new seat)				

General election 1915: Pietermaritzburg North
Party	Candidate	Votes	%	±%
South African	Thomas Orr	880	69.8	+9.6
Labour	F. G. E. Tilbury	379	30.2	−9.6
Majority		295	39.6	+19.2
Turnout		1,259	63.6	N/A
South African hold		Swing	+9.6	

=== Elections in the 1920s ===
General election 1920: Pietermaritzburg North
Party	Candidate	Votes	%	±%
Labour	T. G. Strachan	917	61.6	+31.4
South African	Thomas Orr	572	38.4	−31.4
Majority		345	23.2	N/A
Turnout		1,489	67.0	+3.4
Labour gain from		Swing	+31.4	

General election 1921: Pietermaritzburg North
Party	Candidate	Votes	%	±%
Labour	T. G. Strachan	752	50.4	−11.2
South African	W. A. Deane	740	49.6	+11.2
Majority		12	0.8	−22.4
Turnout		1,492	66.9	−0.1
Labour gain from		Swing	-11.2	

General election 1924: Pietermaritzburg North
Party	Candidate	Votes	%	±%
Labour	T. G. Strachan	963	56.9	+6.5
South African	J. Banks	724	42.7	−6.9
Rejected ballots		7	0.4	N/A
Majority		239	14.2	+13.4
Turnout		1,694	84.8	+17.9
Labour hold		Swing	+6.7	

General election 1929: Pietermaritzburg North
Party	Candidate	Votes	%	±%
South African	W. A. Deane	1,456	90.0	+47.3
Labour (Creswell)	T. G. Strachan	85	5.3	−51.6
Labour (N.C.)	N. P. Palmer	65	4.0	New
Rejected ballots		12	0.7	+0.3
Majority		1,371	84.7	N/A
Turnout		1,618	55.9	−28.9
South African gain from Labour		Swing	+49.5	

=== Elections in the 1930s ===
General election 1933: Pietermaritzburg North
Party	Candidate	Votes	%	±%
South African	W. A. Deane	2,170	54.7	−35.3
Natal Home Rule Party	T. G. Strachan	1,782	44.9	New
Rejected ballots		19	0.4	-0.3
Majority		388	9.8	N/A
Turnout		3,971	65.8	+9.9
South African hold		Swing	N/A	
