= Albert (House of Assembly of South Africa constituency) =

- Former constituency for the South African House of Assembly
- Province: Cape of Good Hope
- Electorate: 8,974 (1943)

Former constituency
- Created: 1910
- Abolished: 1948
- Number of members: 1
- Last MHA: F. H. Boltman (NP)

Albert (known as Albert-Aliwal from 1920 to 1924 and Albert-Colesberg from 1938 to 1948) was a constituency in the Cape Province of South Africa, which existed from 1910 to 1948. Named after the district of Albert, the seat initially covered a rural area along the Cape’s northeastern frontier, centred on the town of Burgersdorp. Throughout its existence it elected one member to the House of Assembly and one to the Cape Provincial Council.

== Franchise notes ==
When the Union of South Africa was formed in 1910, the electoral qualifications in use in each pre-existing colony were kept in place. The Cape Colony had implemented a “colour-blind” franchise known as the Cape Qualified Franchise, which included all adult literate men owning more than £75 worth of property (controversially raised from £25 in 1892), and this initially remained in effect after the colony became the Cape Province. As of 1908, 22,784 out of 152,221 electors in the Cape Colony were “Native or Coloured”. Eligibility to serve in Parliament and the Provincial Council, however, was restricted to whites from 1910 onward.

The first challenge to the Cape Qualified Franchise came with the Women's Enfranchisement Act, 1930 and the Franchise Laws Amendment Act, 1931, which extended the vote to women and removed property qualifications for the white population only – non-white voters remained subject to the earlier restrictions. In 1936, the Representation of Natives Act removed all black voters from the common electoral roll and introduced three “Native Representative Members”, white MPs elected by the black voters of the province and meant to represent their interests in particular. A similar provision was made for Coloured voters with the Separate Representation of Voters Act, 1951, and although this law was challenged by the courts, it went into effect in time for the 1958 general election, which was thus held with all-white voter rolls for the first time in South African history. The all-white franchise would continue until the end of apartheid and the introduction of universal suffrage in 1994.

== History ==
Like most rural seats, Albert was reliably conservative for most of its history. With the exception of its first election, in which it was won unopposed by Henry Burton for the South African Party, and the 1921 election, in which Albert-Aliwal was narrowly carried by the SAP, it was won by the National Party in every election in which it was contested. When Aliwal was recreated in 1924, SAP MP C. A. A. Sephton moved there, and Albert became a safe seat for the NP. L. J. Steytler of the NP represented the seat until 1938, at which point the Purified National Party’s F. H. Boltman narrowly won it over the United Party candidate and a spoiler Labour Party candidacy, the only time that party ever contested the seat. Boltman would hold the seat until its abolition, being re-elected for the Reunited National Party in 1943 on an increased majority.

== Members ==
Election	Member	Party
1910	Henry Burton	South African
1915	L. P. Vorster	National Party
1920	L. P. Vorster	National Party
1921	C. A. A. Sephton	South African
1924	L. J. Steytler	National Party
1929	L. J. Steytler	National Party
1933	L. J. Steytler	National Party
1938	F. H. Boltman	GNP
1943	F. H. Boltman	HNP
1948	constituency abolished	

== Detailed results ==
=== Elections in the 1910s ===
General election 1910: Albert
Party	Candidate	Votes	%	±%
South African	Henry Burton	Unopposed		
South African win (new seat)				

General election 1915: Albert
Party	Candidate	Votes	%	±%
National	L. P. Vorster	1,403	54.7	New
South African	Henry Burton	1,164	45.3	N/A
Majority		239	9.4	N/A
Turnout		2,567	90.0	N/A
National gain from South African		Swing	N/A	

=== Elections in the 1920s ===
General election 1920: Albert-Aliwal
Party	Candidate	Votes	%	±%
National	L. P. Vorster	1,461	50.3	−4.4
South African	C. A. Schweizer	1,444	49.7	+4.4
Majority		17	0.6	−8.8
Turnout		2,905	75.8	−14.2
National hold		Swing	-4.4	

General election 1921: Albert-Aliwal
Party	Candidate	Votes	%	±%
South African	C. A. A. Sephton	1,785	52.5	+2.9
National	L. P. Vorster	1,613	47.5	−2.9
Majority		172	0.6	N/A
Turnout		3,398	78.9	+3.1
South African gain from National		Swing	+2.9	

General election 1924: Albert
Party	Candidate	Votes	%	±%
National	L. J. Steytler	1,850	62.1	New
South African	D. G. A. Falck	1,111	37.3	New
Rejected ballots		18	0.6	N/A
Majority		739	24.8	N/A
Turnout		2,979	84.9	N/A
National win (new seat)				

General election 1929: Albert
Party	Candidate	Votes	%	±%
National	L. J. Steytler	1,890	67.3	+5.2
South African	P. E. Scholtz	893	31.7	−5.6
Rejected ballots		27	1.0	+0.4
Majority		997	35.6	+10.8
Turnout		2,810	85.5	+0.6
National hold		Swing	+5.4	

=== Elections in the 1930s ===
General election 1933: Albert
Party	Candidate	Votes	%	±%
National	L. J. Steytler	3,289	64.9	−2.4
Independent	T. P. N. Coetzee	1,711	33.8	New
Rejected ballots		66	1.3	+0.3
Majority		1,578	31.2	N/A
Turnout		5,066	76.3	−9.2
National hold		Swing	N/A	

General election 1938: Albert-Colesberg
Party	Candidate	Votes	%	±%
Purified National	F. H. Boltman	2,884	49.3	New
United	H. A. J. Wium	2,850	48.8	New
Labour	J. G. van Buuren	69	1.2	New
Rejected ballots		42	0.7	N/A
Majority		34	0.6	N/A
Turnout		5,845	90.3	N/A
Purified National win (new seat)				

=== Elections in the 1940s ===
General election 1943: Albert-Colesberg
Party	Candidate	Votes	%	±%
Reunited National	F. H. Boltman	4,205	54.5	+4.8
United	L. D. de Jager	3,513	45.5	−3.6
Majority		692	9.0	+8.4
Turnout		7,718	89.7	+14.4
Reunited National hold		Swing	+4.3	
