= Dominion Party (South Africa) =

Defunct political party in South Africa

The Dominion Party was a South African political party established in late October 1934 by dissatisfied members of the South African Party when that party fused with the National Party to form the United National South African Party, commonly referred to as the "United Party".

Its formation was mainly due to distrust of the motives of Prime Minister J.B.M. Hertzog and the new Afrikaner nationalist faction that he brought into the now-united Party. The party was established principally to maintain South Africa's "British connection" (it campaigned to keep the Union Jack and God Save the King in 1938 and to enter the Second World War in 1939 on the side of Britain) and particularly Natal's distinct British culture. The Party won 8 seats in the 1938 general election and lost one in 1943. General Smuts's United Party won 89 seats in 1943, and had had the support of the two Independents, the Labour Party (9 seats) and the Dominion Party (2 seats).

In October 1934, the Dominion Party adopted a programme of principles at its first annual congress. In terms of bread-and-butter issues, it was an arguably progressive programme, with policies such as the introduction of unemployment insurance, the elimination of slums and their replacement with new State-supported local authority housing, and recognition of the obligation on the part of the State “to secure the provision of sufficient food, clothing and housing for the whole population.” The programme was less progressive in regards to race, however. Although calling for the “raising of the economic condition of the Natives,” it also called for the “placing of relations between the European and Bantu races on a stable basis which will ensure the predominance of White civilisation in the Union.”

The party won no seats in 1948 election and disappeared from national politics. The Dominion Party leader was Colonel C.F. Stallard, who later served as Minister of Mines during the second Ministry of Jan Smuts. The withdrawal of Hertzog and his supporters from the UP government in 1939 can be said to have made the party redundant, explaining its later decline.

== See also ==
- Unionist Party (South Africa) (1910-1920)
