= Results of the 1924 South African general election =

- 17 June 1924

All 135 seats in the House of Assembly 68 seats needed for a majority
- Registered: 413,136
- Turnout: 77.23% (▲21.63pp)
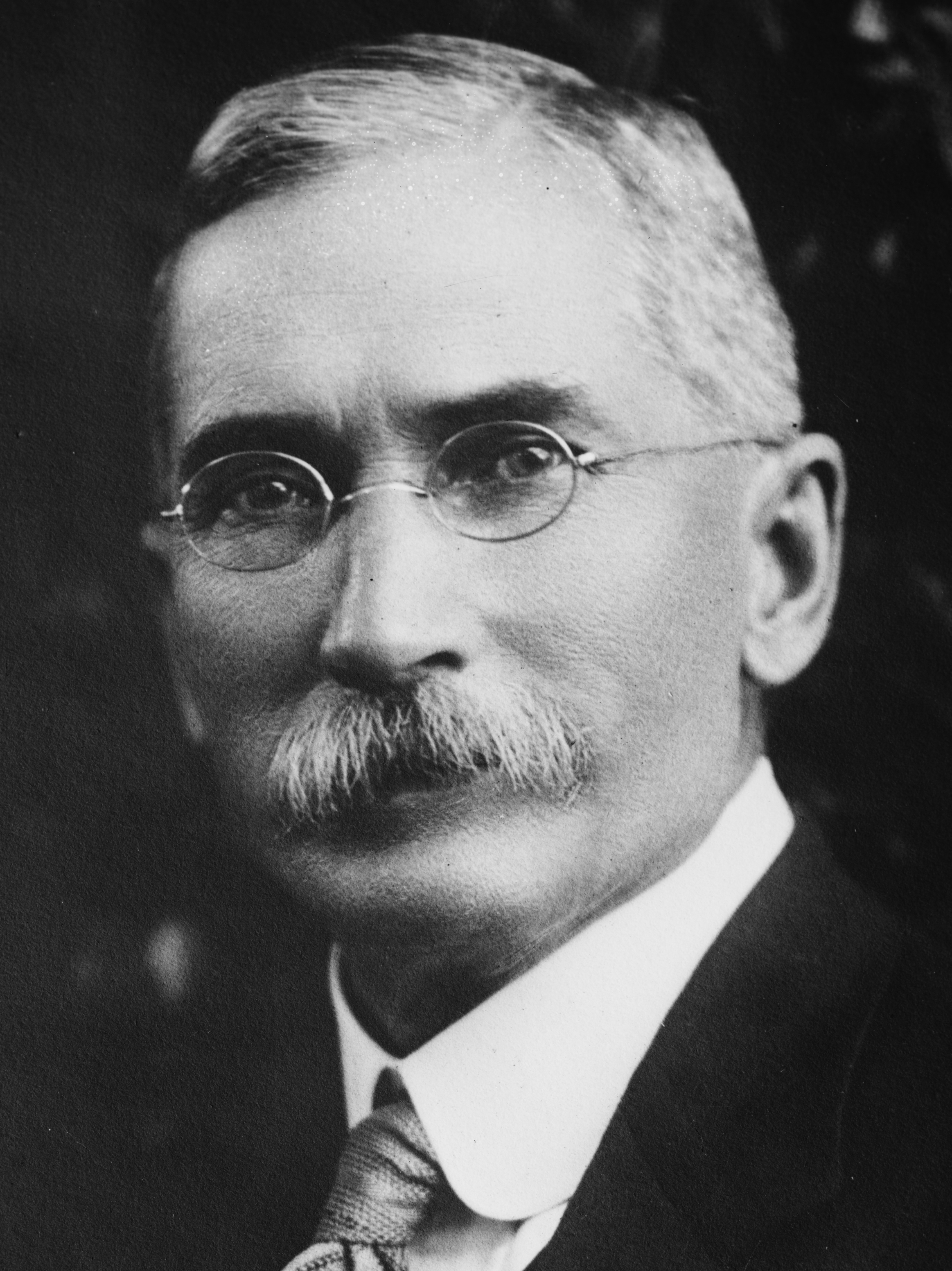

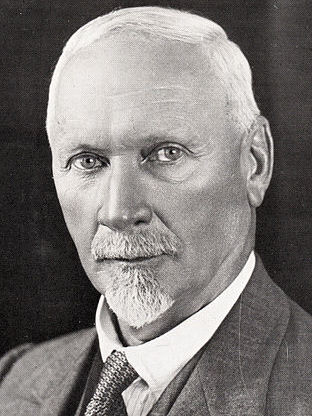

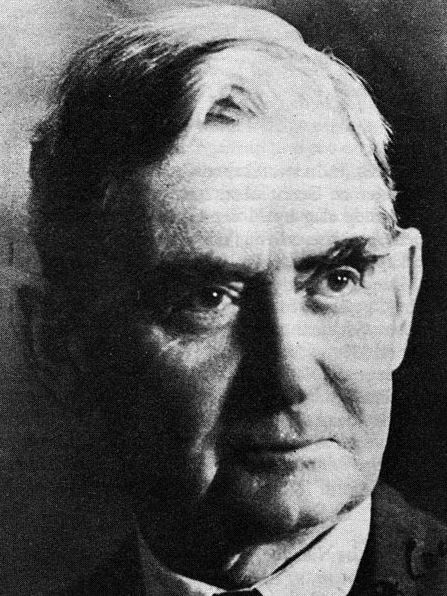
	First party	Second party	Third party
Leader	J. B. M. Hertzog	Jan Smuts	Frederic Creswell
Party	National	South African	Labour
Leader's seat	Smithfield	Pretoria West (lost re-election)	Denver
Last election	38.15%, 44 seats	49.92%, 77 seats	10.68%, 10 seats
Seats won	63	53	18
Seat change	▲19	▼24	▲8
Popular vote	111,483	148,769	45,380
Percentage	35.25%	47.04%	14.35%
Swing	▼2.90pp	▼2.86pp	▲3.67pp
- Results by province
Prime Minister before election
Jan Smuts
South African
Elected Prime Minister
J. B. M. Hertzog
National

This is a list of constituency results for the 1924 South African general election.

== Boundary changes ==
The Fourth Delimitation Commission (1923) expanded the House of Assembly from 134 to 135 seats, with the new seat going to the Transvaal, but the Commission also made changes to the constituencies in the three other provinces.

Province	Seats 1910	Created	Abolished	Seats 1915
Cape of Good Hope	51	Albert; Aliwal; East London North; Gordonia; Port Elizabeth South	Albert-Aliwal; Border; Port Elizabeth Southwest; Prieska; Woodstock	51
Natal	17			17
Orange Free State	17	Wepener	Rouxville	17
Transvaal	49	Delarey; North East Rand	Commissioner Street	50

== Cape Province ==
Party	Votes	%	Seats
South African Party	76,309	50.42	26
National Party	51,849	34.26	20
Labour Party	12,465	8.24	2
Constitutional Democrat	2,546	1.68	1
Independent South African Party	1,373	0.91	1
Independents	6,790	4.49	0
Total	151,332	100.00	50
Source: Schoeman

Unopposed candidates: SAP 1.

=== Albany ===
General election 1924: Albany
Party	Candidate	Votes	%	±%
South African	R. H. Struben	1,744	58.2	N/A
Independent	F. G. Reynolds	1,225	40.8	New
Rejected ballots		29	1.0	N/A
Majority		519	17.4	N/A
Turnout		2,998	82.1	N/A
South African hold		Swing	N/A	

=== Albert ===
General election 1924: Albert
Party	Candidate	Votes	%	±%
National	L. J. Steytler	1,850	62.1	New
South African	D. G. A. Falck	1,111	37.3	New
Rejected ballots		18	0.6	N/A
Majority		739	24.8	N/A
Turnout		2,979	84.9	N/A
National win (new seat)				

=== Aliwal ===
General election 1924: Aliwal
Party	Candidate	Votes	%	±%
South African	C. A. A. Sephton	1,553	52.5	New
National	H. S. van Zyl	1,381	46.6	New
Rejected ballots		27	0.9	N/A
Majority		172	5.9	N/A
Turnout		2,961	86.1	N/A
South African win (new seat)				

=== Barkly ===
General election 1924: Barkly
Party	Candidate	Votes	%	±%
National	W. B. de Villiers	1,559	50.7	+1.6
South African	P. E. Scholtz	1,496	48.7	−2.2
Rejected ballots		20	0.6	N/A
Majority		63	2.0	N/A
Turnout		3,075	84.8	+7.6
National gain from South African		Swing	+1.9	

=== Beaconsfield ===
General election 1924: Beaconsfield
Party	Candidate	Votes	%	±%
South African	Sir David Harris	1,686	62.6	N/A
National	J. H. Munnik	990	36.7	New
Rejected ballots		19	0.7	N/A
Majority		696	25.9	N/A
Turnout		2,695	82.2	N/A
South African hold		Swing	N/A	

=== Beaufort West ===
General election 1924: Beaufort West
Party	Candidate	Votes	%	±%
National	Eric Louw	1,727	61.7	+10.2
South African	W. van der Byl	1,046	37.4	−11.1
Rejected ballots		25	0.9	N/A
Majority		93	24.3	+21.3
Turnout		2,798	85.1	+2.5
National hold		Swing	+10.7	

=== Bechuanaland ===
General election 1924: Bechuanaland
Party	Candidate	Votes	%	±%
National	I. van Wijk Raubenheimer	1,299	53.2	+1.3
Independent	P. H. de Kock	1,098	45.0	New
Rejected ballots		43	1.8	N/A
Majority		199	8.2	N/A
Turnout		2,440	79.7	+7.0
National hold		Swing	N/A	

=== Caledon ===
General election 1924: Caledon
Party	Candidate	Votes	%	±%
South African	Joel Krige	1,906	58.7	−3.8
National	F. W. Beyers	1,313	40.4	+2.9
Rejected ballots		31	0.9	N/A
Majority		593	18.3	−6.7
Turnout		3,250	88.2	+7.5
South African hold		Swing	-3.4	

=== Calvinia ===
General election 1924: Calvinia
Party	Candidate	Votes	%	±%
National	D. F. Malan	1,573	61.5	+0.4
South African	F. J. van der Merwe	942	36.8	−2.1
Rejected ballots		43	0.7	N/A
Majority		631	24.7	+2.5
Turnout		2,558	72.0	+1.4
National hold		Swing	+1.3	

=== Cape Town Central ===
General election 1924: Cape Town Central
Party	Candidate	Votes	%	±%
South African	John William Jagger	2,285	71.1	−8.9
Independent	W. Moore	906	28.2	New
Rejected ballots		24	0.7	N/A
Majority		1,379	42.9	N/A
Turnout		3,215	68.4	+10.0
South African hold		Swing	N/A	

=== Cape Town Gardens ===
General election 1924: Cape Town Gardens
Party	Candidate	Votes	%	±%
South African	C. W. A. Coulter	1,781	51.1	−17.3
Labour	Robert Forsyth	1,658	47.5	+15.9
Rejected ballots		49	1.4	N/A
Majority		123	3.6	−33.2
Turnout		3,488	75.6	+10.0
South African hold		Swing	-16.6	

=== Cape Town Hanover Street ===
General election 1924: Cape Town Hanover Street
Party	Candidate	Votes	%	±%
Constitutional Democrat	Morris Alexander	1,531	51.1	N/A
South African	I. Purcell	1,389	46.4	New
Rejected ballots		75	2.5	N/A
Majority		142	4.7	N/A
Turnout		2,995	66.0	N/A
Constitutional Democrat hold		Swing	N/A	

=== Cape Town Harbour ===
General election 1924: Cape Town Harbour
Party	Candidate	Votes	%	±%
South African	Gideon Brand van Zyl	2,112	63.2	−7.7
Labour	C. S. Playfair	1,167	34.9	+5.8
Rejected ballots		62	1.9	N/A
Majority		945	28.3	−13.5
Turnout		3,341	70.2	+14.8
South African hold		Swing	-6.8	

=== Ceres ===
General election 1924: Ceres
Party	Candidate	Votes	%	±%
National	J. W. J. W. Roux	1,683	52.8	−3.0
South African	J. G. du Toit	1,474	46.2	+2.0
Rejected ballots		32	1.0	N/A
Majority		209	6.6	−5.0
Turnout		3,189	86.9	+6.9
National hold		Swing	-2.5	

=== Colesberg ===
General election 1924: Colesberg
Party	Candidate	Votes	%	±%
South African	G. A. Louw	1,582	51.3	−3.8
National	F. J. du Toit	1,478	48.0	+3.1
Rejected ballots		22	0.7	N/A
Majority		104	3.3	−6.9
Turnout		3,082	85.9	+8.6
South African hold		Swing	-3.5	

=== Cradock ===
General election 1924: Cradock
Party	Candidate	Votes	%	±%
South African	G. C. van Heerden	1,819	50.5	+2.0
National	I. P. van Heerden	1,773	49.2	−2.3
Rejected ballots		13	0.3	N/A
Majority		46	1.3	N/A
Turnout		3,605	89.8	+12.5
South African gain from National		Swing	+2.1	

=== East London City ===
General election 1924: East London City
Party	Candidate	Votes	%	±%
South African	W. W. Rider	1,545	50.5	−0.2
Labour	James Stewart	1,451	47.5	−1.8
Rejected ballots		61	2.0	N/A
Majority		94	3.0	+1.6
Turnout		3,057	87.5	+17.3
South African hold		Swing	+0.8	

=== East London North ===
General election 1924: East London North
Party	Candidate	Votes	%	±%
South African	J. J. Byron	1,628	58.7	New
Labour	W. L. Plyman	1,110	40.0	New
Rejected ballots		38	1.3	N/A
Majority		518	18.7	N/A
Turnout		2,776	80.2	N/A
South African win (new seat)				

=== Fort Beaufort ===
General election 1924: Fort Beaufort
Party	Candidate	Votes	%	±%
South African	Thomas Smartt	1,508	52.6	−11.5
Independent	H. Sinclair	1,328	46.3	New
Rejected ballots		33	1.1	N/A
Majority		180	6.3	N/A
Turnout		2,869	79.9	+10.0
South African hold		Swing	N/A	

=== George ===
General election 1924: George
Party	Candidate	Votes	%	±%
National	G. F. Brink	1,724	53.8	+1.8
South African	H. J. Raubenheimer	1,453	45.3	−2.7
Rejected ballots		27	0.9	N/A
Majority		271	8.5	+4.5
Turnout		3,204	85.4	+4.5
National hold		Swing	+2.3	

=== Gordonia ===
General election 1924: Gordonia
Party	Candidate	Votes	%	±%
National	J. H. Conradie	1,607	55.7	New
South African	J. P. Coetzee	1,260	43.6	New
Rejected ballots		19	0.7	N/A
Majority		347	12.1	N/A
Turnout		2,886	84.8	N/A
National win (new seat)				

=== Graaff-Reinet ===
General election 1924: Graaff-Reinet
Party	Candidate	Votes	%	±%
National	Karl Bremer	1,849	62.5	+3.5
South African	W. Rubidge	1,091	36.9	−4.1
Rejected ballots		20	0.6	N/A
Majority		758	25.6	+7.6
Turnout		2,960	81.0	+12.7
National hold		Swing	+3.8	

=== Griqualand ===
General election 1924: Griqualand
Party	Candidate	Votes	%	±%
South African	L. D. Gilson	1,160	53.9	−25.1
Independent	C. E. Tod	971	45.1	New
Rejected ballots		23	1.0	N/A
Majority		189	8.8	N/A
Turnout		2,154	60.3	−2.0
South African hold		Swing	N/A	

=== Hopetown ===
General election 1924: Hopetown
Party	Candidate	Votes	%	±%
National	A. J. Stals	1,607	51.1	+5.9
South African	P. S. Cilliers	1,515	48.1	−6.7
Rejected ballots		26	0.8	N/A
Majority		92	3.0	N/A
Turnout		3,148	86.9	+9.7
National gain from South African		Swing	+6.3	

=== Humansdorp ===
General election 1924: Humansdorp
Party	Candidate	Votes	%	±%
National	Charl W. Malan	1,824	59.1	−0.2
South African	J. A. L. de Waal	1,241	40.2	−0.5
Rejected ballots		20	0.7	N/A
Majority		583	18.9	+0.3
Turnout		3,085	85.9	+23.9
National hold		Swing	+0.2	

=== Kimberley ===
General election 1924: Kimberley
Party	Candidate	Votes	%	±%
South African	Ernest Oppenheimer	1,984	67.4	+5.9
Labour	S. B. Kitchin	925	31.2	−7.1
Rejected ballots		35	1.2	N/A
Majority		1,059	36.2	+13.2
Turnout		2,944	80.7	+16.4
South African hold		Swing	+6.6	

=== King William's Town ===
General election 1924: King William's Town
Party	Candidate	Votes	%	±%
South African	Robert Ballantine	1,433	52.0	+2.4
Independent	C. H. Malcomess	1,262	45.8	+15.8
Rejected ballots		60	2.2	N/A
Majority		171	6.2	−13.4
Turnout		2,755	75.5	+5.1
South African hold		Swing	-6.7	

=== Ladismith ===
General election 1924: Ladismith
Party	Candidate	Votes	%	±%
National	J. J. M. van Zyl	1,776	51.4	+1.8
South African	Henry Burton	1,663	48.1	−2.3
Rejected ballots		16	0.5	N/A
Majority		113	3.3	N/A
Turnout		3,455	91.6	+5.0
National gain from South African		Swing	+2.0	

=== Liesbeek ===
General election 1924: Liesbeek
Party	Candidate	Votes	%	±%
Labour	Charles Pearce	1,605	51.8	+4.5
South African	A. E. V. Fraser	1,393	45.0	−6.6
Rejected ballots		97	3.2	N/A
Majority		212	6.8	N/A
Turnout		3,095	69.8	+14.2
Labour gain from South African		Swing	+5.5	

=== Malmesbury ===
General election 1924: Malmesbury
Party	Candidate	Votes	%	±%
National	P. A. Bergh	1,981	52.0	+7.1
South African	F. S. Malan	1,788	46.9	−8.2
Rejected ballots		44	1.1	N/A
Majority		193	5.1	N/A
Turnout		3,813	91.2	+7.3
National gain from South African		Swing	+7.7	

=== Namaqualand ===
General election 1924: Namaqualand
Party	Candidate	Votes	%	±%
National	J. P. Mostert	1,565	65.0	−4.9
South African	G. H. D. Schmolke	808	33.5	+3.2
Rejected ballots		35	1.7	N/A
Majority		757	31.5	−7.9
Turnout		2,408	67.3	+6.1
National hold		Swing	-4.0	

=== Newlands ===
General election 1924: Newlands
Party	Candidate	Votes	%	±%
South African	Richard Stuttaford	1,717	61.7	−14.0
Constitutional Democrat	C. A. Lagesen	1,015	36.5	New
Rejected ballots		51	1.8	N/A
Majority		702	25.2	N/A
Turnout		2,783	73.5	+18.0
South African hold		Swing	N/A	

=== Oudtshoorn ===
General election 1924: Oudtshoorn
Party	Candidate	Votes	%	±%
National	S. P. le Roux	2,024	59.5	+11.3
South African	S. G. Schoeman	1,351	39.7	−12.1
Rejected ballots		28	0.8	N/A
Majority		673	19.8	N/A
Turnout		3,403	85.4	+8.0
National gain from South African		Swing	+11.7	

=== Paarl ===
General election 1924: Paarl
Party	Candidate	Votes	%	±%
South African	A. L. de Jager	1,751	52.1	−7.8
National	P. P. du Toit	1,578	47.0	+6.9
Rejected ballots		31	0.9	N/A
Majority		173	5.1	−14.7
Turnout		3,360	84.0	+6.2
South African hold		Swing	-7.4	

=== Piketberg ===
General election 1924: Piketberg
Party	Candidate	Votes	%	±%
National	J. H. H. de Waal	1,883	59.6	+3.3
South African	M. J. de Beer	1,249	39.5	−4.2
Rejected ballots		29	0.9	N/A
Majority		618	20.1	+7.5
Turnout		3,161	82.8	+2.6
National hold		Swing	+3.8	

=== Port Elizabeth Central ===
General election 1924: Port Elizabeth Central
Party	Candidate	Votes	%	±%
South African	Deneys Reitz	1,705	70.9	−9.9
Labour	R. L. Weir	661	27.5	+8.3
Rejected ballots		40	1.6	N/A
Majority		1,044	43.4	−18.2
Turnout		2,406	77.4	+30.4
South African hold		Swing	-9.1	

=== Port Elizabeth South ===
General election 1924: Port Elizabeth South
Party	Candidate	Votes	%	±%
South African	William Macintosh	2,102	71.0	New
Labour	H. G. R. Theys	758	25.6	New
Rejected ballots		102	3.4	N/A
Majority		1,344	45.4	N/A
Turnout		2,962	80.0	N/A
South African win (new seat)				

=== Queenstown ===
General election 1924: Queenstown
Party	Candidate	Votes	%	±%
South African	Livingstone Moffat	Unopposed		
South African hold				

=== Riversdale ===
General election 1924: Riversdale
Party	Candidate	Votes	%	±%
National	A. L. Badenhorst	1,740	56.7	+6.7
South African	J. F. van Wyk	1,315	42.8	−7.2
Rejected ballots		16	0.5	N/A
Majority		425	13.9	+13.9
Turnout		3,071	89.8	+3.7
National hold		Swing	+7.0	

=== Rondebosch ===
General election 1924: Rondebosch
Party	Candidate	Votes	%	±%
South African	R. W. Close	1,610	58.3	−20.8
Labour	J. Lomax	1,138	41.2	+20.3
Rejected ballots		13	0.5	N/A
Majority		472	17.1	−41.1
Turnout		2,761	76.1	+26.1
South African hold		Swing	-20.6	

=== Salt River ===
General election 1924: Salt River
Party	Candidate	Votes	%	±%
Labour	W. J. Snow	1,992	66.4	+7.2
South African	H. S. Walker	979	32.6	−6.3
Rejected ballots		30	0.9	N/A
Majority		1,013	33.8	+13.5
Turnout		3,001	61.0	+12.7
Labour hold		Swing	+6.8	

=== Somerset ===
General election 1924: Somerset
Party	Candidate	Votes	%	±%
National	A. P. J. Fourie	1,930	60.6	+5.9
South African	T. W. Bell	1,234	38.8	−6.5
Rejected ballots		20	0.6	N/A
Majority		696	21.8	+12.4
Turnout		3,184	83.0	+4.9
National hold		Swing	+6.2	

=== South Peninsula ===
General election 1924: South Peninsula
Party	Candidate	Votes	%	±%
South African	Drummond Chaplin	1,690	60.6	−17.2
National	W. H. Lategan	1,053	37.8	+16.2
Rejected ballots		46	1.7	N/A
Majority		637	22.8	−32.6
Turnout		2,789	64.9	+16.2
South African hold		Swing	-16.7	

=== Stellenbosch ===
General election 1924: Stellenbosch
Party	Candidate	Votes	%	±%
South African	J. P. Louw	2,160	55.5	N/A
National	Paul Sauer	1,690	43.4	New
Rejected ballots		41	1.1	N/A
Majority		470	12.1	N/A
Turnout		3,891	86.9	N/A
South African hold		Swing	N/A	

=== Swellendam ===
General election 1924: Swellendam
Party	Candidate	Votes	%	±%
South African	Eli Buirski	1,781	55.3	−2.8
National	J. H. Coetzee	1,416	44.0	+2.1
Rejected ballots		24	0.7	N/A
Majority		365	11.3	−4.9
Turnout		3,221	88.5	+11.7
South African hold		Swing	-2.5	

=== Tembuland ===
General election 1924: Tembuland
Party	Candidate	Votes	%	±%
Ind. South African	A. O. B. Payn	1,373	50.8	+1.0
South African	W. H. Stuart	1,307	48.4	−1.8
Rejected ballots		22	0.8	N/A
Majority		66	2.4	N/A
Turnout		2,702	74.2	+11.1
Ind. South African gain from South African		Swing	+1.9	

=== Three Rivers ===
General election 1924: Three Rivers
Party	Candidate	Votes	%	±%
South African	D. M. Brown	1,787	63.8	−3.5
National	C. Krog-Scheepers	940	33.5	+10.8
Rejected ballots		76	2.7	N/A
Majority		847	30.3	−14.3
Turnout		2,803	78.5	+18.9
South African hold		Swing	-7.2	

=== Uitenhage ===
General election 1924: Uitenhage
Party	Candidate	Votes	%	±%
South African	F. T. Bates	1,785	51.2	−5.7
National	J. J. H. Bellingan	1,551	47.5	+4.4
Rejected ballots		47	1.3	N/A
Majority		129	3.7	−10.1
Turnout		3,488	89.3	+9.6
South African hold		Swing	-5.1	

=== Victoria West ===
General election 1924: Victoria West
Party	Candidate	Votes	%	±%
National	F. J. du Toit	1,776	52.7	+2.6
South African	H. J. Nel	1,574	46.7	−3.2
Rejected ballots		22	0.6	N/A
Majority		202	6.0	+5.8
Turnout		3,372	92.4	+9.6
National hold		Swing	+2.9	

=== Wodehouse ===
General election 1924: Wodehouse
Party	Candidate	Votes	%	±%
National	O. S. Vermooten	1,620	53.2	+4.1
South African	J. A. Venter	1,410	46.3	−4.6
Rejected ballots		13	0.5	N/A
Majority		210	6.9	N/A
Turnout		3,210	87.7	+7.0
National gain from South African		Swing	+4.4	

=== Worcester ===
General election 1924: Worcester
Party	Candidate	Votes	%	±%
South African	C. B. Heatlie	1,966	52.3	−5.0
National	G. van Z. Wolfaard	1,766	47.0	+4.3
Rejected ballots		27	0.8	N/A
Majority		200	5.3	−9.3
Turnout		3,759	90.9	+7.2
South African hold		Swing	-4.7	

== Natal ==
Party	Votes	%	Seats
South African Party	15,283	56.84	13
Labour Party	6,917	25.73	3
National Party	2,764	10.28	1
Ind. National	399	1.48	0
Independents	1,525	5.67	0
Total	26,888	100.00	17
Source: Schoeman

=== Dundee ===
General election 1924: Dundee
Party	Candidate	Votes	%	±%
South African	Thomas Watt	675	52.9	−13.5
National	D. B. Jones	602	47.1	+13.5
Rejected ballots		0	0.0	N/A
Majority		73	5.8	−27.0
Turnout		1,277	72.3	+12.2
South African hold		Swing	-13.5	

=== Durban Berea ===
General election 1924: Durban Berea
Party	Candidate	Votes	%	±%
South African	James Henderson	1,267	71.3	−4.4
Labour	A. H. Haycock	506	28.5	+4.2
Rejected ballots		4	0.2	N/A
Majority		696	42.8	−8.6
Turnout		1,777	81.4	+29.4
South African hold		Swing	-4.3	

=== Durban Central ===
General election 1924: Durban Central
Party	Candidate	Votes	%	±%
South African	C. P. Robinson	840	51.3	−3.4
Labour	J. W. Coleman	793	48.4	+4.5
Rejected ballots		5	0.3	N/A
Majority		47	2.9	−7.9
Turnout		1,638	81.5	+23.4
South African hold		Swing	-4.0	

=== Durban Greyville ===
General election 1924: Durban Greyville
Party	Candidate	Votes	%	±%
Labour	Tommy Boydell	1,183	65.6	+2.0
South African	W. Gilbert	613	34.0	−0.6
Rejected ballots		8	0.4	N/A
Majority		570	31.6	+2.6
Turnout		1,804	84.8	+27.7
Labour hold		Swing	+1.3	

=== Durban Point ===
General election 1924: Durban Point
Party	Candidate	Votes	%	±%
South African	A. M. Miller	736	43.5	−10.9
Labour	Archibald Jamieson	522	30.9	−7.0
Independent	H. H. Kemp	429	25.4	New
Rejected ballots		4	0.2	N/A
Majority		214	12.6	−3.9
Turnout		1,691	80.1	+19.6
South African hold		Swing	-2.0	

=== Durban Stamford Hill ===
General election 1924: Durban Stamford Hill
Party	Candidate	Votes	%	±%
South African	F. J. Lennox	1,206	57.7	−5.2
Labour	A. Eaton	880	42.1	+5.0
Rejected ballots		5	0.2	N/A
Majority		326	15.6	−10.2
Turnout		1,623	60.0	+4.5
South African hold		Swing	-5.1	

=== Durban Umbilo ===
General election 1924: Durban Umbilo
Party	Candidate	Votes	%	±%
Labour	George Reyburn	1,022	50.9	+8.0
South African	E. F. Hoare	972	48.4	−8.7
Rejected ballots		13	0.7	N/A
Majority		50	2.5	N/A
Turnout		2,007	85.8	+16.4
Labour gain from South African		Swing	+8.4	

=== Illovo ===
General election 1924: Illovo
Party	Candidate	Votes	%	±%
South African	J. S. Marwick	1,100	85.1	N/A
Independent	A. Fawcus	182	14.1	New
Rejected ballots		10	0.8	N/A
Majority		918	71.0	N/A
Turnout		1,292	63.9	N/A
South African hold		Swing	N/A	

=== Klip River ===
General election 1924: Klip River
Party	Candidate	Votes	%	±%
South African	H. E. K. Anderson	792	52.0	−15.1
National	P. J. Meyer	721	47.3	+14.4
Rejected ballots		10	0.7	N/A
Majority		71	4.7	−29.5
Turnout		1,523	77.0	+9.9
South African hold		Swing	-14.8	

=== Natal Coast ===
General election 1924: Natal Coast
Party	Candidate	Votes	%	±%
South African	William Arnott	1,057	79.4	N/A
Independent	P. A. Silburn	250	18.8	New
Rejected ballots		24	1.8	N/A
Majority		807	60.6	N/A
Turnout		1,331	67.1	N/A
South African hold		Swing	N/A	

=== Newcastle ===
General election 1924: Newcastle
Party	Candidate	Votes	%	±%
South African	O. R. Nel	783	52.0	−1.7
National	J. H. B. Wessels	717	47.6	+1.3
Rejected ballots		7	0.4	N/A
Majority		66	4.4	−3.0
Turnout		1,507	82.8	−10.2
South African hold		Swing	-1.5	

=== Pietermaritzburg North ===
General election 1924: Pietermaritzburg North
Party	Candidate	Votes	%	±%
Labour	T. G. Strachan	963	56.9	+6.5
South African	J. Banks	724	42.7	−6.9
Rejected ballots		7	0.4	N/A
Majority		239	14.2	+13.4
Turnout		1,694	84.8	+17.9
Labour hold		Swing	+6.7	

=== Pietermaritzburg South ===
General election 1924: Pietermaritzburg South
Party	Candidate	Votes	%	±%
South African	W. J. O'Brien	1,000	68.3	N/A
Labour	G. Stobie	446	30.5	New
Rejected ballots		18	0.8	N/A
Majority		554	37.8	N/A
Turnout		1,464	81.0	N/A
South African hold		Swing	N/A	

=== Umvoti ===
General election 1924: Umvoti
Party	Candidate	Votes	%	±%
South African	W. A. Deane	873	56.7	−6.1
Independent	G. H. Hulett	664	43.1	New
Rejected ballots		3	0.2	N/A
Majority		209	13.6	N/A
Turnout		1,540	82.3	+15.5
South African hold		Swing	N/A	

=== Vryheid ===
General election 1924: Vryheid
Party	Candidate	Votes	%	±%
National	Ernest George Jansen	999	54.5	+4.4
South African	B. J. E. Human	823	44.9	−5.0
Rejected ballots		11	0.6	N/A
Majority		176	9.6	+9.4
Turnout		1,833	86.0	+6.3
National hold		Swing	+4.7	

=== Weenen ===
General election 1924: Weenen
Party	Candidate	Votes	%	±%
South African	G. R. Richards	963	69.7	−9.9
Ind. National	W. E. St. C. Moor	399	28.9	New
Rejected ballots		20	0.8	N/A
Majority		664	40.8	N/A
Turnout		1,382	73.7	+20.1
South African hold		Swing	N/A	

=== Zululand ===
General election 1924: Zululand
Party	Candidate	Votes	%	±%
South African	George Heaton Nicholls	859	71.8	−12.1
National	J. H. F. Boshoff	327	27.3	+11.2
Rejected ballots		11	0.9	N/A
Majority		532	44.5	−23.3
Turnout		1,197	66.6	+11.1
South African hold		Swing	-11.7	

== Orange Free State ==
Party	Votes	%	Seats
National Party	19,410	67.09	16
South African Party	8,086	27.95	0
Labour Party	1,436	4.96	1
Total	28,932	100.00	17
Source: Schoeman

Unopposed candidates: National 3.

=== Bethlehem ===
General election 1924: Bethlehem
Party	Candidate	Votes	%	±%
National	J. H. B. Wessels	1,511	73.8	+3.7
South African	E. M. Ellenberger	507	24.8	−5.1
Rejected ballots		30	1.4	N/A
Majority		1,004	49.0	+8.8
Turnout		2,048	72.1	+5.5
National hold		Swing	+4.4	

=== Bloemfontein North ===
General election 1924: Bloemfontein North
Party	Candidate	Votes	%	±%
Labour	Arthur Barlow	1,436	58.8	+1.5
South African	B. Kasselman	997	40.8	New
Rejected ballots		10	0.4	N/A
Majority		439	18.0	N/A
Turnout		2,443	76.1	+9.7
Labour hold		Swing	N/A	

=== Bloemfontein South ===
General election 1924: Bloemfontein South
Party	Candidate	Votes	%	±%
National	Colin Fraser Steyn	1,300	63.6	+12.6
South African	H. N. W. Botha	738	36.1	−12.9
Rejected ballots		6	0.3	N/A
Majority		562	27.5	+25.5
Turnout		2,044	80.9	+10.8
National gain from		Swing	+12.8	

=== Boshof ===
General election 1924: Boshof
Party	Candidate	Votes	%	±%
National	C. A. van Niekerk	Unopposed		
National hold				

=== Edenburg ===
General election 1924: Edenburg
Party	Candidate	Votes	%	±%
National	Fredrik William Beyers	1,507	77.4	+0.4
South African	J. J. R. van der Linde	404	20.8	−2.2
Rejected ballots		36	1.8	N/A
Majority		1,103	56.6	+2.6
Turnout		1,947	77.1	+17.1
National hold		Swing	+1.3	

=== Fauresmith ===
General election 1924: Fauresmith
Party	Candidate	Votes	%	±%
National	Nicolaas Havenga	Unopposed		
National hold				

=== Ficksburg ===
General election 1924: Ficksburg
Party	Candidate	Votes	%	±%
National	J. G. Keyter	1,844	79.4	+1.7
South African	C. F. R. von Maltitz	442	19.0	−3.3
Rejected ballots		36	1.6	N/A
Majority		1,402	60.4	+5.0
Turnout		2,322	75.6	+10.8
National hold		Swing	+2.5	

=== Frankfort ===
General election 1924: Frankfort
Party	Candidate	Votes	%	±%
National	J. B. Wessels	Unopposed		
National hold				

=== Harrismith ===
General election 1924: Harrismith
Party	Candidate	Votes	%	±%
National	A. A. Cilliers	1,319	64.7	−0.5
South African	P. J. C. Maree	699	34.3	−0.5
Rejected ballots		20	1.0	N/A
Majority		620	30.4	+−0
Turnout		2,038	69.3	+0.4
National hold		Swing	+-0	

=== Heilbron ===
General election 1924: Heilbron
Party	Candidate	Votes	%	±%
National	M. L. Malan	1,497	74.9	+2.5
South African	C. D. Naudé	470	23.5	−3.9
Rejected ballots		32	1.4	N/A
Majority		1,027	51.4	+6.6
Turnout		1,999	77.6	+12.5
National hold		Swing	+3.3	

=== Hoopstad ===
General election 1924: Hoopstad
Party	Candidate	Votes	%	±%
National	E. A. Conroy	1,376	69.2	−0.1
South African	G. R. Theron	573	28.8	−1.9
Rejected ballots		39	2.0	N/A
Majority		803	40.6	+2.0
Turnout		1,988	72.3	+8.0
National hold		Swing	+1.0	

=== Kroonstad ===
General election 1924: Kroonstad
Party	Candidate	Votes	%	±%
National	A. J. Werth	1,429	63.7	+1.7
South African	H. P. Meyer	795	35.4	−2.6
Rejected ballots		16	0.9	N/A
Majority		634	28.3	+4.3
Turnout		2,240	78.0	+4.8
National hold		Swing	+2.2	

=== Ladybrand ===
General election 1924: Ladybrand
Party	Candidate	Votes	%	±%
National	C. R. Swart	1,471	76.3	+10.7
South African	J. H. van Rheenen	439	22.8	−11.6
Rejected ballots		16	0.9	+9.8
Majority		1,032	53.5	+22.3
Turnout		1,929	75.9	+12.7
National hold		Swing	+11.2	

=== Smithfield ===
General election 1924: Smithfield
Party	Candidate	Votes	%	±%
National	J. B. M. Hertzog	1,701	81.7	N/A
South African	G. L. Steytler	347	16.7	New
Rejected ballots		34	1.6	N/A
Majority		1,354	65.0	N/A
Turnout		2,082	76.7	N/A
National hold		Swing	N/A	

=== Vredefort ===
General election 1924: Vredefort
Party	Candidate	Votes	%	±%
National	J. H. Munnik	1,356	67.3	−3.0
South African	L. W. Boshoff	641	31.8	+2.1
Rejected ballots		17	0.9	N/A
Majority		715	35.5	−5.1
Turnout		2,014	70.3	+10.9
National hold		Swing	-2.6	

=== Wepener ===
General election 1924: Wepener
Party	Candidate	Votes	%	±%
National	Daniël Hugo	1,464	74.5	New
South African	G. J. van der Riet	483	24.6	New
Rejected ballots		18	0.9	N/A
Majority		981	49.9	N/A
Turnout		2,014	59.4	N/A
National win (new seat)				

=== Winburg ===
General election 1924: Winburg
Party	Candidate	Votes	%	±%
National	C. T. M. Wilcocks	1,635	74.0	+4.3
South African	F. R. Cronjé	551	24.9	−5.4
Rejected ballots		24	1.1	N/A
Majority		782	49.1	+9.7
Turnout		2,210	82.1	+16.4
National hold		Swing	+4.9	

== Transvaal ==
Party	Votes	%	Seats
South African Party	48,647	44.59	12
National Party	37,460	34.34	26
Labour Party	22,035	20.20	12
Independent South African Party	409	0.37	0
Independents	539	0.49	0
Total	109,090	100.00	50
Source: Schoeman

=== Barberton ===
General election 1924: Barberton
Party	Candidate	Votes	%	±%
National	W. H. Rood	1,180	50.8	+7.6
South African	J. C. Fourie	1,131	48.7	−8.1
Rejected ballots		12	0.5	N/A
Majority		49	2.1	N/A
Turnout		2,323	80.0	+15.2
National gain from South African		Swing	+7.9	

=== Benoni ===
General election 1924: Benoni
Party	Candidate	Votes	%	±%
Labour	Walter Madeley	1,236	69.1	+6.0
South African	H. P. Venter	545	30.5	New
Rejected ballots		9	0.4	N/A
Majority		691	38.6	N/A
Turnout		1,790	78.6	+19.4
Labour hold		Swing	N/A	

=== Bethal ===
General election 1924: Bethal
Party	Candidate	Votes	%	±%
South African	H. S. Grobler	1,079	50.3	−7.2
National	C. S. Raath	1,056	49.3	+6.8
Rejected ballots		8	0.4	N/A
Majority		23	1.0	−14.0
Turnout		2,143	83.3	+18.6
South African hold		Swing	-7.0	

=== Bezuidenhout ===
General election 1924: Bezuidenhout
Party	Candidate	Votes	%	±%
South African	Leslie Blackwell	1,388	52.2	−5.6
Labour	W. J. McIntyre	1,261	47.5	+5.3
Rejected ballots		7	0.3	N/A
Majority		230	4.7	−10.9
Turnout		2,656	81.6	+15.3
South African hold		Swing	-5.5	

=== Boksburg ===
General election 1924: Boksburg
Party	Candidate	Votes	%	±%
Labour	J. J. McMenamin	1,111	51.5	+19.1
South African	Robert Hugh Henderson	1,042	48.3	−1.7
Rejected ballots		6	17.6	N/A
Majority		69	3.2	N/A
Turnout		2,159	82.6	+8.9
Labour gain from South African		Swing	+10.4	

=== Brakpan ===
General election 1924: Brakpan
Party	Candidate	Votes	%	±%
Labour	R. B. Waterston	1,447	70.7	+20.5
South African	G. J. Joubert	591	28.9	New
Rejected ballots		10	0.4	N/A
Majority		856	41.8	N/A
Turnout		2,048	78.6	+8.9
Labour hold		Swing	N/A	

=== Christiana ===
General election 1924: Christiana
Party	Candidate	Votes	%	±%
National	H. H. Moll	834	64.2	−4.0
South African	A. J. Marais	455	35.0	New
Rejected ballots		10	0.8	N/A
Majority		379	29.2	N/A
Turnout		1,299	57.8	−3.7
National hold		Swing	N/A	

=== Delarey ===
General election 1924: Delarey
Party	Candidate	Votes	%	±%
National	A. S. van Hees	1,053	65.3	New
South African	J. A. du Plessis	555	34.4	New
Rejected ballots		4	0.3	N/A
Majority		498	30.9	N/A
Turnout		1,612	73.5	N/A
National win (new seat)				

=== Denver ===
General election 1924: Denver
Party	Candidate	Votes	%	±%
Labour	Frederic Creswell	1,550	65.0	+24.0
South African	P. D. V. Alexander	800	33.6	−9.3
Independent	S. Scott	23	1.0	New
Rejected ballots		11	0.4	N/A
Majority		750	31.4	N/A
Turnout		2,384	80.0	+11.8
Labour gain from South African		Swing	+16.7	

=== Ermelo ===
General election 1924: Ermelo
Party	Candidate	Votes	%	±%
South African	William Richard Collins	1,335	52.9	−7.7
National	S. P. Bekker	1,178	46.7	+7.3
Rejected ballots		11	0.4	N/A
Majority		478	6.2	−17.0
Turnout		2,524	82.5	+8.7
South African hold		Swing	-8.5	

=== Fordsburg ===
General election 1924: Fordsburg
Party	Candidate	Votes	%	±%
National	J. S. F. Pretorius	1,412	61.5	+23.6
South African	Harry Graumann	845	36.8	+8.3
Rejected ballots		39	1.7	N/A
Majority		567	24.7	N/A
Turnout		2,296	77.3	+21.4
National hold		Swing	+7.7	

=== Germiston ===
General election 1924: Germiston
Party	Candidate	Votes	%	±%
Labour	George Brown	1,317	58.0	+35.5
South African	H. S. McAlister	941	41.4	+1.8
Rejected ballots		13	0.6	N/A
Majority		376	16.6	N/A
Turnout		2,627	71.1	+1.4
Labour gain from South African		Swing	+16.9	

=== Heidelberg ===
General election 1924: Heidelberg
Party	Candidate	Votes	%	±%
National	S. D. de Wet	1,086	52.7	+5.5
South African	F. W. R. Robertson	965	46.8	−6.0
Rejected ballots		11	0.5	N/A
Majority		750	5.9	N/A
Turnout		2,062	80.4	+17.9
National gain from South African		Swing	+5.8	

=== Hospital ===
General election 1924: Hospital
Party	Candidate	Votes	%	±%
South African	H. B. Papenfus	1,100	51.2	−17.3
Labour	C. Walters	1,043	48.5	New
Rejected ballots		7	0.3	N/A
Majority		57	2.7	N/A
Turnout		2,150	73.9	+11.4
South African hold		Swing	N/A	

=== Jeppes ===
General election 1924: Jeppes
Party	Candidate	Votes	%	±%
Labour	Harry Sampson	1,301	64.8	N/A
South African	F. W. R. Robertson	690	34.4	New
Rejected ballots		17	0.8	N/A
Majority		611	30.4	N/A
Turnout		2,008	71.3	N/A
Labour hold		Swing	N/A	

=== Johannesburg North ===
General election 1924: Johannesburg North
Party	Candidate	Votes	%	±%
South African	Lourens Geldenhuys	1,340	52.1	−8.3
Labour	J. Duthie	1,216	47.3	New
Rejected ballots		14	0.6	N/A
Majority		124	4.8	N/A
Turnout		2,570	78.3	+13.4
South African hold		Swing	N/A	

=== Klerksdorp ===
General election 1924: Klerksdorp
Party	Candidate	Votes	%	±%
National	J. S. Smit	1,187	56.6	+3.4
South African	J. A. Nesser	907	43.3	−3.5
Rejected ballots		2	0.1	N/A
Majority		280	13.3	+6.9
Turnout		2,096	88.1	+10.4
National hold		Swing	+3.5	

=== Krugersdorp ===
General election 1924: Krugersdorp
Party	Candidate	Votes	%	±%
National	B. R. Hattingh	1,386	57.6	+18.3
South African	Abe Bailey	1,010	42.0	−2.5
Rejected ballots		11	0.4	N/A
Majority		376	15.6	N/A
Turnout		2,600	74.6	+0.1
National gain from South African		Swing	+10.4	

=== Langlaagte ===
General election 1924: Langlaagte
Party	Candidate	Votes	%	±%
Labour	John Christie	1,333	54.8	+2.4
South African	Willam Bawden	1,090	44.8	−2.8
Rejected ballots		11	0.4	N/A
Majority		243	10.0	+5.2
Turnout		2,434	81.2	+18.6
Labour hold		Swing	+2.6	

=== Lichtenburg ===
General election 1924: Lichtenburg
Party	Candidate	Votes	%	±%
National	Tielman Roos	1,302	66.0	−6.1
South African	A. P. Visser	651	33.0	+5.1
Rejected ballots		20	0.9	N/A
Majority		651	33.0	−11.2
Turnout		1,973	81.3	+15.8
National hold		Swing	-5.6	

=== Losberg ===
General election 1924: Losberg
Party	Candidate	Votes	%	±%
National	G. P. Brits	1,206	51.0	+8.3
South African	T. F. J. Dreyer	1,150	48.6	−8.7
Rejected ballots		9	0.4	N/A
Majority		56	2.4	N/A
Turnout		2,365	82.4	+11.8
National gain from South African		Swing	+8.5	

=== Lydenburg ===
General election 1924: Lydenburg
Party	Candidate	Votes	%	±%
South African	Jacobus Nieuwenhuize	1,108	49.8	−4.7
National	E. de Souza	1,100	49.4	+3.9
Rejected ballots		18	0.8	N/A
Majority		8	0.4	−8.6
Turnout		2,226	82.2	+18.0
South African hold		Swing	-4.3	

=== Marico ===
General election 1924: Marico
Party	Candidate	Votes	%	±%
National	J. J. Pienaar	1,367	61.9	+11.9
South African	P. J. W. du Plessis	828	37.5	−12.5
Rejected ballots		13	0.6	N/A
Majority		539	24.4	+24.4
Turnout		2,208	86.8	+10.7
National gain from South African		Swing	+12.2	

=== Middelburg ===
General election 1924: Middelburg
Party	Candidate	Votes	%	±%
National	J. D. Heyns	1,239	53.3	+1.9
South African	B. D. Bierman	1,076	46.3	−2.3
Rejected ballots		9	0.4	N/A
Majority		163	7.0	+4.2
Turnout		2,324	86.3	+10.6
National hold		Swing	+2.1	

=== North East Rand ===
General election 1924: North East Rand
Party	Candidate	Votes	%	±%
National	Hjalmar Reitz	1,203	53.8	New
South African	H. J. Hofmeyr	1,027	45.9	New
Rejected ballots		8	0.3	N/A
Majority		176	7.9	N/A
Turnout		2,238	81.3	N/A
National win (new seat)				

=== Parktown ===
General election 1924: Parktown
Party	Candidate	Votes	%	±%
South African	Willie Rockey	1,985	78.2	N/A
Labour	G. Hills	550	21.7	New
Rejected ballots		3	0.1	N/A
Majority		1,435	56.5	N/A
Turnout		2,538	72.5	N/A
South African hold		Swing	N/A	

=== Pietersburg ===
General election 1924: Pietersburg
Party	Candidate	Votes	%	±%
National	Tom Naudé	1,293	56.4	+1.4
South African	P. J. Naudé	990	43.2	−1.8
Rejected ballots		11	0.4	N/A
Majority		303	13.2	+3.2
Turnout		2,294	76.9	+7.7
National hold		Swing	+1.6	

=== Potchefstroom ===
General election 1924: Potchefstroom
Party	Candidate	Votes	%	±%
National	M. L. Fick	1,275	52.6	+1.6
South African	H. van der Merwe	1,146	47.2	−1.8
Rejected ballots		5	0.2	N/A
Majority		129	5.4	+3.4
Turnout		2,426	88.4	+14.8
National hold		Swing	+1.7	

=== Pretoria Central ===
General election 1924: Pretoria Central
Party	Candidate	Votes	%	±%
National	Charles te Water	1,163	50.9	New
South African	Edward Rooth	1,110	48.6	N/A
Rejected ballots		10	0.5	N/A
Majority		53	1.3	N/A
Turnout		2,283	83.2	N/A
National gain from South African		Swing	N/A	

=== Pretoria District North ===
General election 1924: Pretoria District North
Party	Candidate	Votes	%	±%
National	Harm Oost	1,165	58.8	+7.1
South African	W. R. F. Teichman	794	40.1	−8.2
Rejected ballots		23	1.1	N/A
Majority		371	18.7	+15.3
Turnout		1,982	78.5	+9.3
National hold		Swing	+7.7	

=== Pretoria District South ===
General election 1924: Pretoria District South
Party	Candidate	Votes	%	±%
National	Chris Muller	1,021	55.4	+3.2
South African	J. van der Walt	812	44.1	−3.7
Rejected ballots		9	0.5	N/A
Majority		209	11.3	+6.9
Turnout		1,842	82.5	+10.5
National hold		Swing	+3.5	

=== Pretoria East ===
General election 1924: Pretoria East
Party	Candidate	Votes	%	±%
South African	C. W. Giovanetti	1,489	60.6	−15.7
Labour	E. Burgess	960	39.1	New
Rejected ballots		7	0.3	N/A
Majority		529	21.5	N/A
Turnout		2,456	80.8	+16.6
South African hold		Swing	N/A	

=== Pretoria West ===
General election 1924: Pretoria West
Party	Candidate	Votes	%	±%
Labour	G. A. Hay	1,407	57.5	New
South African	Jan Smuts	1,022	41.8	−39.5
Independent	P. J. Botes	7	0.3	New
Rejected ballots		10	0.3	N/A
Majority		385	15.7	N/A
Turnout		2,446	82.8	+34.3
Labour gain from South African		Swing	N/A	

=== Roodepoort ===
General election 1924: Roodepoort
Party	Candidate	Votes	%	±%
Labour	John Mullineux	1,137	54.4	−3.7
South African	Charles Stallard	944	45.1	+3.2
Rejected ballots		8	0.5	N/A
Majority		193	9.3	−6.9
Turnout		2,089	80.2	+27.4
Labour hold		Swing	-3.5	

=== Rustenburg ===
General election 1924: Rustenburg
Party	Candidate	Votes	%	±%
National	P. G. W. Grobler	1,151	52.7	+2.7
South African	L. A. S. Lemmer	1,021	46.8	−3.2
Rejected ballots		12	0.5	N/A
Majority		130	5.9	N/A
Turnout		2,184	85.1	+14.6
National gain from South African		Swing	+3.0	

=== Soutpansberg ===
General election 1924: Soutpansberg
Party	Candidate	Votes	%	±%
National	Oswald Pirow	1,153	55.2	+9.7
South African	Hendrik Mentz	927	44.4	−10.1
Rejected ballots		10	0.4	N/A
Majority		226	10.8	N/A
Turnout		2,090	80.6	+19.2
National hold		Swing	+9.9	

=== Springs ===
General election 1924: Springs
Party	Candidate	Votes	%	±%
Labour	John Allen	1,179	56.6	+18.9
South African	C. E. Dearlove	899	43.1	−1.7
Rejected ballots		7	0.3	N/A
Majority		280	13.5	N/A
Turnout		2,085	76.5	+11.2
Labour gain from South African		Swing	+10.3	

=== Standerton ===
General election 1924: Standerton
Party	Candidate	Votes	%	±%
South African	G. M. Claassen	1,273	57.0	−11.1
National	G. F. Kuun	950	42.5	+10.6
Rejected ballots		11	0.5	N/A
Majority		323	14.5	−21.7
Turnout		2,234	79.7	+24.2
South African hold		Swing	-10.9	

=== Troyeville ===
General election 1924: Troyeville
Party	Candidate	Votes	%	±%
Labour	Morris Kentridge	1,217	53.6	+8.6
South African	W. S. Webber	995	43.8	−11.2
Independent	W. E. Bleloch	54	2.4	New
Rejected ballots		6	0.2	N/A
Majority		222	9.8	N/A
Turnout		2,272	80.3	+12.0
Labour gain from South African		Swing	+9.9	

=== Turffontein ===
General election 1924: Turffontein
Party	Candidate	Votes	%	±%
Labour	A. C. Fordham	1,200	49.3	+5.2
South African	H. Solomon	816	33.5	−22.4
Ind. South African	E. W. Hunt	409	16.8	New
Rejected ballots		8	0.4	N/A
Majority		384	15.8	N/A
Turnout		2,433	80.6	+12.3
Labour gain from South African		Swing	+13.8	

=== Ventersdorp ===
General election 1924: Ventersdorp
Party	Candidate	Votes	%	±%
National	L. J. Boshoff	1,126	52.3	+4.2
South African	B. I. J. van Heerden	1,025	47.6	−4.3
Rejected ballots		3	0.1	N/A
Majority		101	4.7	N/A
Turnout		2,154	83.6	+12.6
National gain from South African		Swing	+4.3	

=== Von Brandis ===
General election 1924: Von Brandis
Party	Candidate	Votes	%	±%
South African	Emile Nathan	1,146	58.3	−15.0
Labour	J. M. Coplans	815	41.5	+14.8
Rejected ballots		4	0.2	N/A
Majority		331	16.8	−29.8
Turnout		1,965	70.3	+19.1
South African hold		Swing	-14.9	

=== Vrededorp ===
General election 1924: Vrededorp
Party	Candidate	Votes	%	±%
National	T. C. Visser	1,783	82.9	+4.3
South African	C. J. Smith	356	16.5	−4.4
Rejected ballots		13	0.6	N/A
Majority		1,427	66.4	+8.7
Turnout		2,152	67.5	+8.3
National hold		Swing	+4.4	

=== Wakkerstroom ===
General election 1924: Wakkerstroom
Party	Candidate	Votes	%	±%
National	A. S. Naudé	1,235	53.9	+4.8
South African	A. G. Robertson	1,045	45.6	−5.3
Rejected ballots		11	0.5	N/A
Majority		190	8.3	N/A
Turnout		2,291	85.6	+9.0
National gain from South African		Swing	+5.1	

=== Waterberg ===
General election 1924: Waterberg
Party	Candidate	Votes	%	±%
National	P. W. le Roux van Niekerk	1,235	59.4	−5.1
South African	F. P. van Deventer	830	39.9	+4.4
Rejected ballots		16	0.7	N/A
Majority		405	19.5	−9.5
Turnout		2,081	73.3	+5.9
National hold		Swing	-4.8	

=== Witbank ===
General election 1924: Witbank
Party	Candidate	Votes	%	±%
National	A. I. E. de Villiers	1,175	55.4	+2.8
South African	J. F. Ludorf	934	44.0	−3.4
Rejected ballots		14	0.6	N/A
Majority		241	11.4	+6.2
Turnout		2,123	83.8	+20.7
National hold		Swing	+3.1	

=== Witwatersberg ===
General election 1924: Witwatersberg
Party	Candidate	Votes	%	±%
South African	N. J. Pretorius	1,090	50.0	−0.4
National	S. F. Alberts	1,073	49.2	−0.8
Rejected ballots		17	0.8	N/A
Majority		17	0.8	+0.8
Turnout		2,180	78.6	+9.3
South African hold		Swing	+0.4	

=== Wolmaransstad ===
General election 1924: Wolmaransstad
Party	Candidate	Votes	%	±%
National	Jan Kemp	1,201	69.3	+4.0
South African	J. J. Lichtenberg	520	30.0	−4.7
Rejected ballots		11	0.7	N/A
Majority		681	39.3	+8.7
Turnout		1,732	71.0	+10.1
National hold		Swing	+4.4	

=== Wonderboom ===
General election 1924: Wonderboom
Party	Candidate	Votes	%	±%
National	B. J. Pienaar	1,672	73.3	+4.7
South African	F. L. Leipoldt	602	26.4	−5.0
Rejected ballots		8	0.3	N/A
Majority		1,070	46.9	+9.7
Turnout		2,282	74.0	+10.3
National hold		Swing	+4.9	

=== Yeoville ===
General election 1924: Yeoville
Party	Candidate	Votes	%	±%
South African	Patrick Duncan	1,682	68.8	N/A
Labour	A. Jacobson	755	30.9	New
Rejected ballots		8	0.2	N/A
Majority		927	37.9	N/A
Turnout		2,445	75.6	N/A
South African hold		Swing	N/A	
