= Edenburg (House of Assembly of South Africa constituency) =

- Former constituency for the South African House of Assembly
- Province: Orange Free State
- Electorate: 2,641 (1929)

Former constituency
- Created: 1910
- Abolished: 1933
- Number of members: 1
- Last MHA: J. J. Serfontein (NP)

Edenburg was a constituency in the Orange Free State Province of South Africa, which existed from 1910 to 1933. Named after the town of Edenburg, the seat covered a rural area in the south of the province. Throughout its existence it elected one member to the House of Assembly.

== Franchise notes ==
When the Union of South Africa was formed in 1910, the electoral qualifications in use in each pre-existing colony were kept in place. In the Orange River Colony, and its predecessor the Orange Free State, the vote was restricted to white men, and as such, elections in the Orange Free State Province were held on a whites-only franchise from the beginning. The franchise was also restricted by property and education qualifications until the 1933 general election, following the passage of the Women's Enfranchisement Act, 1930 and the Franchise Laws Amendment Act, 1931. From then on, the franchise was given to all white citizens aged 21 or over. Non-whites remained disenfranchised until the end of apartheid and the introduction of universal suffrage in 1994.

== History ==
Edenburg, like most of the Orange Free State, was a highly conservative seat throughout its existence and had a largely Afrikaans-speaking electorate. It was held throughout its existence (apart from the 1910 election) by the National Party, and for most of that time was represented by a single MP: Fredrik William Beyers, who was first elected in a by-election in 1918 and served in cabinet under J. B. M. Hertzog between 1924 and 1929. He left parliament after the 1929 general election, and shortly thereafter was appointed a judge of the Supreme Court, and became notable as the first judge in that court to deliver opinions in Afrikaans. Edenburg's final parliamentary term would be chaotic, as Beyers' replacement, Charl Wynand Markelbach du Toit, also resigned in 1932 to contest a by-election in Colesberg, a considerably more marginal seat in the Cape Province. The resulting by-election in Edenburg was won unopposed by Jan Jonathan Serfontein, who served until the seat's abolition and later served as MP for Boshof and Fauresmith.

== Members ==
Election	Member	Party
1910	Evert Nicolaas Grobler	Orangia Unie
1915	Everard Walter Fichardt	National
1918 by	Fredrik William Beyers	National
1920	Fredrik William Beyers	National
1921	Fredrik William Beyers	National
1924	Fredrik William Beyers	National
1929	Fredrik William Beyers	National
1929 by	Charl Wynand Markelbach du Toit	National
1932 by	Jan Jonathan Serfontein	National
1933	constituency abolished	

== Detailed results ==
=== Elections in the 1910s ===
General election 1910: Edenburg
Party	Candidate	Votes	%	±%
Orangia Unie	E. N. Grobler	Unopposed		
Orangia Unie win (new seat)				

General election 1915: Edenburg
Party	Candidate	Votes	%	±%
National	E. W. Fichardt	1,096	65.1	New
South African	F. E. T. Krause	587	34.9	N/A
Majority		509	30.2	N/A
Turnout		1,683	77.1	N/A
National gain from South African		Swing	N/A	

Edenburg by-election, 4 July 1918
Party	Candidate	Votes	%	±%
National	Fredrik William Beyers	Unopposed		
National hold				

=== Elections in the 1920s ===
General election 1920: Edenburg
Party	Candidate	Votes	%	±%
National	Fredrik William Beyers	1,287	75.8	+10.7
South African	C. J. Visser	412	24.2	−10.7
Majority		875	51.6	+21.4
Turnout		1,699	62.9	N/A
National hold		Swing	+10.7	

General election 1921: Edenburg
Party	Candidate	Votes	%	±%
National	Fredrik William Beyers	1,300	77.0	+1.2
South African	Christoffel Jacobus Visser	388	23.0	−1.2
Majority		912	54.0	+2.4
Turnout		1,688	60.0	−2.9
National hold		Swing	+1.2	

General election 1924: Edenburg
Party	Candidate	Votes	%	±%
National	Fredrik William Beyers	1,507	77.4	+0.4
South African	J. J. R. van der Linde	404	20.8	−2.2
Rejected ballots		36	1.8	N/A
Majority		1,103	56.6	+2.6
Turnout		1,947	77.1	+17.1
National hold		Swing	+1.3	

General election 1929: Edenburg
Party	Candidate	Votes	%	±%
National	Fredrik William Beyers	1,638	81.1	+3.7
South African	A. J. Griesel	355	17.6	−3.2
Rejected ballots		26	1.3	-0.5
Majority		1,283	63.5	+6.9
Turnout		2,019	76.5	−0.6
National hold		Swing	+3.5	

Edenburg by-election, 1 October 1929
Party	Candidate	Votes	%	±%
National	Charl Wynand Markelbach du Toit	Unopposed		
National hold				

=== Elections in the 1930s ===
Edenburg by-election, 23 August 1932
Party	Candidate	Votes	%	±%
National	Jan Jonathan Serfontein	Unopposed		
National hold				
