= Beaconsfield (House of Assembly of South Africa constituency) =

Former electoral district of the House of Assembly in South Africa

- Former constituency for the South African House of Assembly
- Province: Cape of Good Hope
- Electorate: 3,921 (1929)

Former constituency
- Created: 1910
- Abolished: 1938
- Number of members: 1
- Last MHA: W. B. Humphreys (SAP)
- Replaced by: Kimberley City

Beaconsfield was a constituency in the Cape Province of South Africa, which existed from 1910 to 1938. The seat covered an area adjacent to the city of Kimberley, and was named for Beaconsfield, which is now a suburb of Kimberley but was a separate municipality until 1912. Throughout its existence it elected one member to the House of Assembly and one to the Cape Provincial Council.

== Franchise notes ==
When the Union of South Africa was formed in 1910, the electoral qualifications in use in each pre-existing colony were kept in place. The Cape Colony had implemented a “colour-blind” franchise known as the Cape Qualified Franchise, which included all adult literate men owning more than £75 worth of property (controversially raised from £25 in 1892), and this initially remained in effect after the colony became the Cape Province. As of 1908, 22,784 out of 152,221 electors in the Cape Colony were “Native or Coloured”. Eligibility to serve in Parliament and the Provincial Council, however, was restricted to whites from 1910 onward.

The first challenge to the Cape Qualified Franchise came with the Women's Enfranchisement Act, 1930 and the Franchise Laws Amendment Act, 1931, which extended the vote to women and removed property qualifications for the white population only – non-white voters remained subject to the earlier restrictions. In 1936, the Representation of Natives Act removed all black voters from the common electoral roll and introduced three “Native Representative Members”, white MPs elected by the black voters of the province and meant to represent their interests in particular. A similar provision was made for Coloured voters with the Separate Representation of Voters Act, 1951, and although this law was challenged by the courts, it went into effect in time for the 1958 general election, which was thus held with all-white voter rolls for the first time in South African history. The all-white franchise would continue until the end of apartheid and the introduction of universal suffrage in 1994.

== History ==
For the 28 years of its existence, Beaconsfield was represented by only two MPs. The first, diamond magnate and incumbent Cape Parliament MP Sir David Harris, was elected unopposed in the 1910 election and easily saw off Labour Party challengers in 1915 and 1920. Throughout this period he was an independent, but when the Unionist and South African parties merged in 1921, Harris joined the unified SAP. In that year's general election, he was again unopposed, and in 1924 saw off a challenge from the National Party. In 1929, Harris retired, and SAP candidate W. B. Humphreys won the seat over the National candidate in the seat's narrowest contest by far. Humphreys was unopposed in the 1933 election, as were many other incumbent MPs across South Africa, and held the seat until its abolition in 1938, at which point he moved to the Kimberley City seat.

== Members ==
| Election | Member | Party |
|---|---|---|
| 1910 | Sir David Harris | Independent |
| 1915 | Sir David Harris | Independent |
| 1920 | Sir David Harris | Independent |
| 1921 | Sir David Harris | South African |
| 1924 | Sir David Harris | South African |
| 1929 | W. B. Humphreys | South African |
| 1933 | W. B. Humphreys | South African |
| 1938 | constituency abolished | |

== Detailed results ==
=== Elections in the 1910s ===
General election 1910: Beaconsfield
| Party | Candidate | Votes | % | ±% |
|---|---|---|---|---|
| Independent | Sir David Harris | Unopposed | | |
| Independent win (new seat) | | | | |

General election 1915: Beaconsfield
| Party | Candidate | Votes | % | ±% |
|---|---|---|---|---|
| Independent | Sir David Harris | 1,298 | 81.2 | N/A |
| Labour | G. A. Hay | 301 | 18.8 | New |
| Majority | | 997 | 62.4 | N/A |
| Turnout | | 1,599 | 50.9 | N/A |
| Independent hold | | Swing | N/A | |

=== Elections in the 1920s ===
General election 1920: Beaconsfield
| Party | Candidate | Votes | % | ±% |
|---|---|---|---|---|
| Independent | Sir David Harris | 2,032 | 73.6 | −7.6 |
| Labour | A. O. Adendorff | 729 | 26.4 | +7.6 |
| Majority | | 1,303 | 47.2 | −15.2 |
| Turnout | | 2,761 | 70.5 | +19.6 |
| Independent hold | | Swing | -7.6 | |

General election 1921: Beaconsfield
| Party | Candidate | Votes | % | ±% |
|---|---|---|---|---|
| South African | Sir David Harris | Unopposed | | |
| South African hold | | | | |

General election 1924: Beaconsfield
| Party | Candidate | Votes | % | ±% |
|---|---|---|---|---|
| South African | Sir David Harris | 1,686 | 62.6 | N/A |
| National | J. H. Munnik | 990 | 36.7 | New |
| Rejected ballots | | 19 | 0.7 | N/A |
| Majority | | 696 | 25.9 | N/A |
| Turnout | | 2,695 | 82.2 | N/A |
| South African hold | | Swing | N/A | |

General election 1929: Beaconsfield
| Party | Candidate | Votes | % | ±% |
|---|---|---|---|---|
| South African | W. B. Humphreys | 1,812 | 54.0 | −8.6 |
| National | S. Zwelback | 1,524 | 45.5 | +8.8 |
| Rejected ballots | | 17 | 0.5 | -0.2 |
| Majority | | 288 | 8.5 | −0.1 |
| Turnout | | 3,353 | 85.5 | +3.9 |
| South African hold | | Swing | -0.1 | |

=== Elections in the 1930s ===
General election 1933: Beaconsfield
| Party | Candidate | Votes | % | ±% |
|---|---|---|---|---|
| South African | W. B. Humphreys | Unopposed | | |
| South African hold | | | | |
