= Fauresmith (House of Assembly of South Africa constituency) =

- Former constituency for the South African House of Assembly
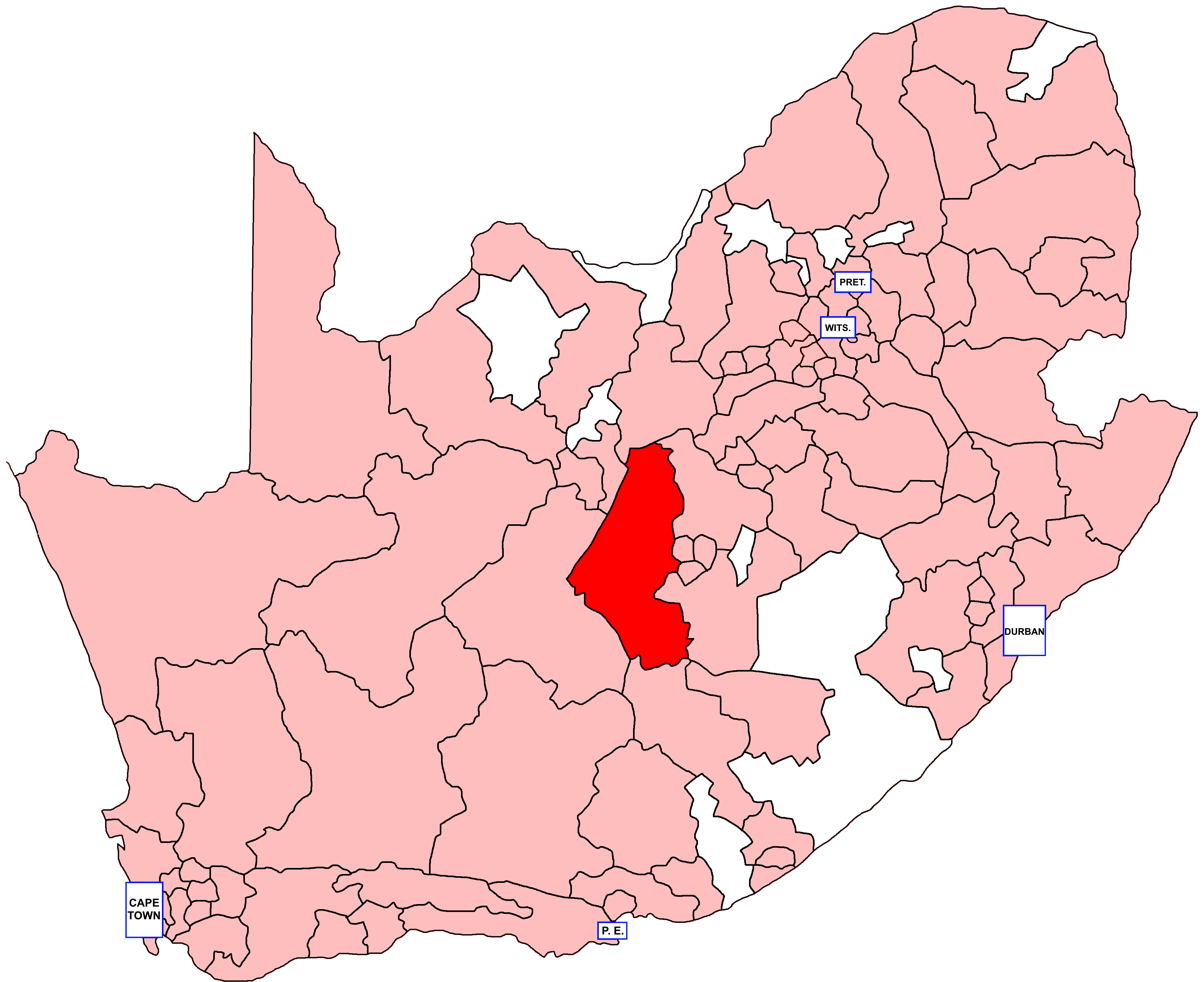
- Location of Fauresmith within South Africa (1981)
- Province: Orange Free State
- Electorate: 10,597 (1989)

Former constituency
- Created: 1910
- Abolished: 1994
- Number of members: 1
- Last MHA: Inus Aucamp (NP)
- Replaced by: Free State

Fauresmith, known as Fauresmith-Boshof between 1953 and 1966, was a constituency in the Orange Free State Province of South Africa, which existed from 1910 to 1994. Named after the town of Fauresmith, the seat covered a large rural area in the west of the province, bordering the Cape Province. Throughout its existence it elected one member to the House of Assembly.

== Franchise notes ==
When the Union of South Africa was formed in 1910, the electoral qualifications in use in each pre-existing colony were kept in place. In the Orange River Colony, and its predecessor the Orange Free State, the vote was restricted to white men, and as such, elections in the Orange Free State Province were held on a whites-only franchise from the beginning. The franchise was also restricted by property and education qualifications until the 1933 general election, following the passage of the Women's Enfranchisement Act, 1930 and the Franchise Laws Amendment Act, 1931. From then on, the franchise was given to all white citizens aged 21 or over. Non-whites remained disenfranchised until the end of apartheid and the introduction of universal suffrage in 1994.

== History ==
Fauresmith, like most of the Orange Free State, was a highly conservative seat throughout its existence and had a largely Afrikaans-speaking electorate. Its most notable MP, Nicolaas Havenga, was first elected in 1915 for the fledgling National Party, and became one of that party's leading policy experts during the 1920s and 30s. Havenga was a close ally of J. B. M. Hertzog, serving in cabinet under him, and when Hertzog joined forces with Jan Smuts and the SAP to create the United Party, Havenga stuck with the new party. He was able to hold his seat in 1938, defeating F. W. Beyers in a close race, but would soon get overtaken by events. When South Africa declared war on Germany in 1939, Hertzog broke with the government, and many of his supporters rejoined the National Party under D. F. Malan's leadership. Havenga, however, had serious disagreements with Malan and declined to join his party, instead forming the Afrikaner Party as a more moderate Afrikaner nationalist force. He resigned from parliament in 1940, and when he returned it was for a different constituency. Instead, Fauresmith was taken by Eben Dönges, a Malan ally who would go on to be one of the architects of apartheid.

Dönges moved to the Cape seat of Worcester in 1948, but the NP would continue to hold Fauresmith for the remainder of the seat's existence. It went unopposed through the 1960s, and in the 1970s and 80s its MPs faced mainly Herstigte and Conservative opposition - unlike many rural Free State seats, however, neither party ever took the seat.

== Members ==
Election	Member	Party
1910	C. T. M. Wilcocks	Orangia Unie
1915	Nicolaas Havenga	National
1920	Nicolaas Havenga	National
1921	Nicolaas Havenga	National
1924	Nicolaas Havenga	National
1929	Nicolaas Havenga	National
1933	Nicolaas Havenga	National
1934	Nicolaas Havenga	United
1938	Nicolaas Havenga	United
1940	Nicolaas Havenga	Afrikaner
1941 by	Eben Dönges	HNP
1943	Eben Dönges	HNP
1948	Jan Jonathan Serfontein	HNP
1953	Jan Jonathan Serfontein	National
1958	Jan Jonathan Serfontein	National
1961	Jan Jonathan Serfontein	National
1966	C. V. van der Merwe	National
1970	C. V. van der Merwe	National
1974	C. V. van der Merwe	National
1977	P. J. S. Olivier	National
1981	P. J. S. Olivier	National
1987	P. J. S. Olivier	National
1989	Inus Aucamp	National
1994	constituency abolished	

== Detailed results ==
=== Elections in the 1910s ===
General election 1910: Fauresmith
Party	Candidate	Votes	%	±%
Orangia Unie	C. T. M. Wilcocks	Unopposed		
Orangia Unie win (new seat)				

General election 1915: Fauresmith
Party	Candidate	Votes	%	±%
National	Nicolaas Havenga	793	52.4	New
South African	S. J. van der Merwe	721	47.6	N/A
Majority		72	4.8	N/A
Turnout		1,514	66.0	N/A
National gain from South African		Swing	N/A	

=== Elections in the 1920s ===
General election 1920: Fauresmith
Party	Candidate	Votes	%	±%
National	Nicolaas Havenga	1,441	69.5	+17.1
South African	H. F. D. Papenfus	633	30.5	−17.1
Majority		808	39.0	N/A
Turnout		2,074	71.2	N/A
National hold		Swing	+17.1	

General election 1921: Fauresmith
Party	Candidate	Votes	%	±%
National	Nicolaas Havenga	1,476	74.1	+4.6
South African	N. F. van der Merwe	515	25.9	−4.6
Majority		961	48.2	+9.2
Turnout		1,991	66.3	−4.9
National hold		Swing	+4.6	

General election 1924: Fauresmith
Party	Candidate	Votes	%	±%
National	Nicolaas Havenga	Unopposed		
National hold				

General election 1929: Fauresmith
Party	Candidate	Votes	%	±%
National	Nicolaas Havenga	1,692	82.9	N/A
South African	N. F. van der Merwe	330	16.2	New
Rejected ballots		18	0.9	N/A
Majority		1,362	66.7	N/A
Turnout		2,040	81.0	N/A
National hold		Swing	N/A	

=== Elections in the 1930s ===
General election 1933: Fauresmith
Party	Candidate	Votes	%	±%
National	Nicolaas Havenga	Unopposed		
National hold				

General election 1938: Fauresmith
Party	Candidate	Votes	%	±%
United	Nicolaas Christiaan Havenga	3,328	52.2	N/A
Purified National	Fredrik William Beyers	2,997	47.0	New
Rejected ballots		51	0.8	N/A
Majority		331	5.2	N/A
Turnout		6,376	94.6	N/A
United hold		Swing	N/A	

=== Elections in the 1940s ===
Fauresmith by-election, 19 March 1941
Party	Candidate	Votes	%	±%
Reunited National	Eben Dönges	3,516	63.9	+16.9
Afrikaner	P. P. Swanepoel	1,936	35.2	New
Rejected ballots		54	0.9	+0.1
Majority		1,580	28.7	N/A
Turnout		5,506	83.4	−11.2
Reunited National gain from United		Swing	N/A	
