= Boshof (House of Assembly of South Africa constituency) =

- Former constituency for the South African House of Assembly
- Province: Orange Free State
- Electorate: 8,800 (1948)

Former constituency
- Created: 1910
- Abolished: 1953
- Number of members: 1
- Last MHA: H. S. Erasmus (NP)
- Replaced by: Fauresmith-Boshof; Odendaalsrus

Boshof, known as Boshof-Hoopstad for the 1948 general election, was a constituency in the Orange Free State Province of South Africa, which existed from 1910 to 1953. Named after the town of Boshof, the seat covered a rural area in the west of the province. Throughout its existence it elected one member to the House of Assembly.

== Franchise notes ==
When the Union of South Africa was formed in 1910, the electoral qualifications in use in each pre-existing colony were kept in place. In the Orange River Colony, and its predecessor the Orange Free State, the vote was restricted to white men, and as such, elections in the Orange Free State Province were held on a whites-only franchise from the beginning. The franchise was also restricted by property and education qualifications until the 1933 general election, following the passage of the Women's Enfranchisement Act, 1930 and the Franchise Laws Amendment Act, 1931. From then on, the franchise was given to all white citizens aged 21 or over. Non-whites remained disenfranchised until the end of apartheid and the introduction of universal suffrage in 1994.

== History ==
Boshof, like most of the Orange Free State, was a highly conservative seat throughout its existence and had a largely Afrikaans-speaking electorate. Its first MP, Christiaan Andries van Niekerk, had led Boer forces during the South African War, and represented Boshof for fourteen years before resigning to take up a seat in the Senate, where he would sit for decades and serve as President of the body. Van Niekerk and his replacement, Josephus Janse van Rensburg, both represented the National Party, which counted Boshof among its safest seats in all of South Africa, usually winning over eighty percent of the vote.

In 1934, Nationalist Prime Minister J. B. M. Hertzog joined forces with Jan Smuts and the SAP to create the United Party, a move that was controversial with his Afrikaner base, and nineteen Nationalist MPs broke away to form the Purified National Party under D. F. Malan's leadership. Van Rensburg stayed loyal to Hertzog and was defeated in 1938 by PNP candidate Jan Jonathan Serfontein, in the only close race in the history of the constituency. Serfontein represented the seat for ten years before moving to neighbouring Fauresmith, at the same time Boshof was merged with the seat of Hoopstad to its east. Hoopstad's MP, Hendrik Schalk Erasmus, was elected to represent the unified seat, which would only exist for a single five-year term. In 1953, Boshof was merged with Fauresmith, while Hoopstad moved into the new seat of Odendaalsrus, to which Erasmus moved.

== Members ==
Election	Member	Party
1910	Christiaan Andries van Niekerk	Orangia Unie
1915	Christiaan Andries van Niekerk	National
1920	Christiaan Andries van Niekerk	National
1921	Christiaan Andries van Niekerk	National
1924	Christiaan Andries van Niekerk	National
1924 by	Josephus Janse van Rensburg	National
1929	Josephus Janse van Rensburg	National
1933	Josephus Janse van Rensburg	National
1934	Josephus Janse van Rensburg	United
1938	Jan Jonathan Serfontein	PNP
1939	Jan Jonathan Serfontein	HNP
1943	Jan Jonathan Serfontein	HNP
1948	H. S. Erasmus	HNP
1953	constituency abolished	

== Detailed results ==
=== Elections in the 1910s ===
General election 1910: Boshof
Party	Candidate	Votes	%	±%
Orangia Unie	C. A. van Niekerk	Unopposed		
Orangia Unie win (new seat)				

General election 1915: Boshof
Party	Candidate	Votes	%	±%
National	C. A. van Niekerk	Unopposed		
National hold				

=== Elections in the 1920s ===
General election 1920: Boshof
Party	Candidate	Votes	%	±%
National	C. A. van Niekerk	1,539	85.9	N/A
South African	P. Scholtz	253	14.1	New
Majority		1,286	71.8	N/A
Turnout		1,792	65.3	N/A
National hold		Swing	N/A	

General election 1921: Boshof
Party	Candidate	Votes	%	±%
National	C. A. van Niekerk	1,618	86.7	+0.8
South African	G. Vivier	248	13.3	−0.8
Majority		1,370	73.4	+1.6
Turnout		1,866	64.9	−0.4
National hold		Swing	+0.8	

General election 1924: Boshof
Party	Candidate	Votes	%	±%
National	C. A. van Niekerk	Unopposed		
National hold				

Boshof by-election, 12 November 1924
Party	Candidate	Votes	%	±%
National	J. J. van Rensburg	Unopposed		
National hold				

General election 1929: Boshof
Party	Candidate	Votes	%	±%
National	J. J. van Rensburg	1,812	89.2	N/A
South African	B. Kasselman	192	9.5	New
Rejected ballots		27	1.3	N/A
Majority		1,620	79.7	N/A
Turnout		2,031	76.0	N/A
National hold		Swing	N/A	

=== Elections in the 1930s ===
General election 1933: Boshof
Party	Candidate	Votes	%	±%
National	J. J. van Rensburg	Unopposed		
National hold				

General election 1938: Boshof
Party	Candidate	Votes	%	±%
Purified National	Jan Jonathan Serfontein	3,169	51.1	New
United	J. J. van Rensburg	3,002	48.4	N/A
Rejected ballots		36	0.5	N/A
Majority		167	2.7	N/A
Turnout		6,207	93.9	N/A
Purified National gain from United		Swing	N/A	
