= Elsenburg Agricultural Training Institute =

Agricultural training college in Western Cape, South Africa

The Elsenburg Agricultural Training Institute (officially known, from 1 April 2004, as the Cape Institute for Agricultural Training: Elsenburg) was established in 1898 as the first agricultural college of its kind in South Africa. It offers a bachelor's degree in agriculture in association with the Faculty of Agriculture and Forestry Sciences at the University of Stellenbosch.

== History ==
The college attracted relatively few students in its first years: having been established in 1898, there were five graduates by June 1899. An average of 44 students per year were enrolled in the years between the turn of the century and the outbreak of World War I, when numbers crashed.

An association with the University of Stellenbosch was established in 1926, whereafter a diploma course was offered to equip prospective farmers.

The government Department of Agriculture accepted responsibility for agricultural training at the college from 1973. A significant addition to the academic courses given in this period was a diploma in cellar technology, making the college, since 1976, a major training institution for South African winemakers.

In the post-1994 period, under a new provincial administration in the newly established Western Cape Province, the Elsenburg and Kromme Rhee colleges of agriculture amalgamated. A Centre for Further Education and Training was established to relieve the Department of Agriculture of its responsibilities.

The renewed association with the University of the Stellenbosch was inaugurated on 1 April 2004.

== Notable alumni ==
- William Benbow Humphreys, Member of the Cape Provincial Council and Member of Parliament (South Africa).
