= De Aar (House of Assembly of South Africa constituency) =

- Former constituency for the South African House of Assembly
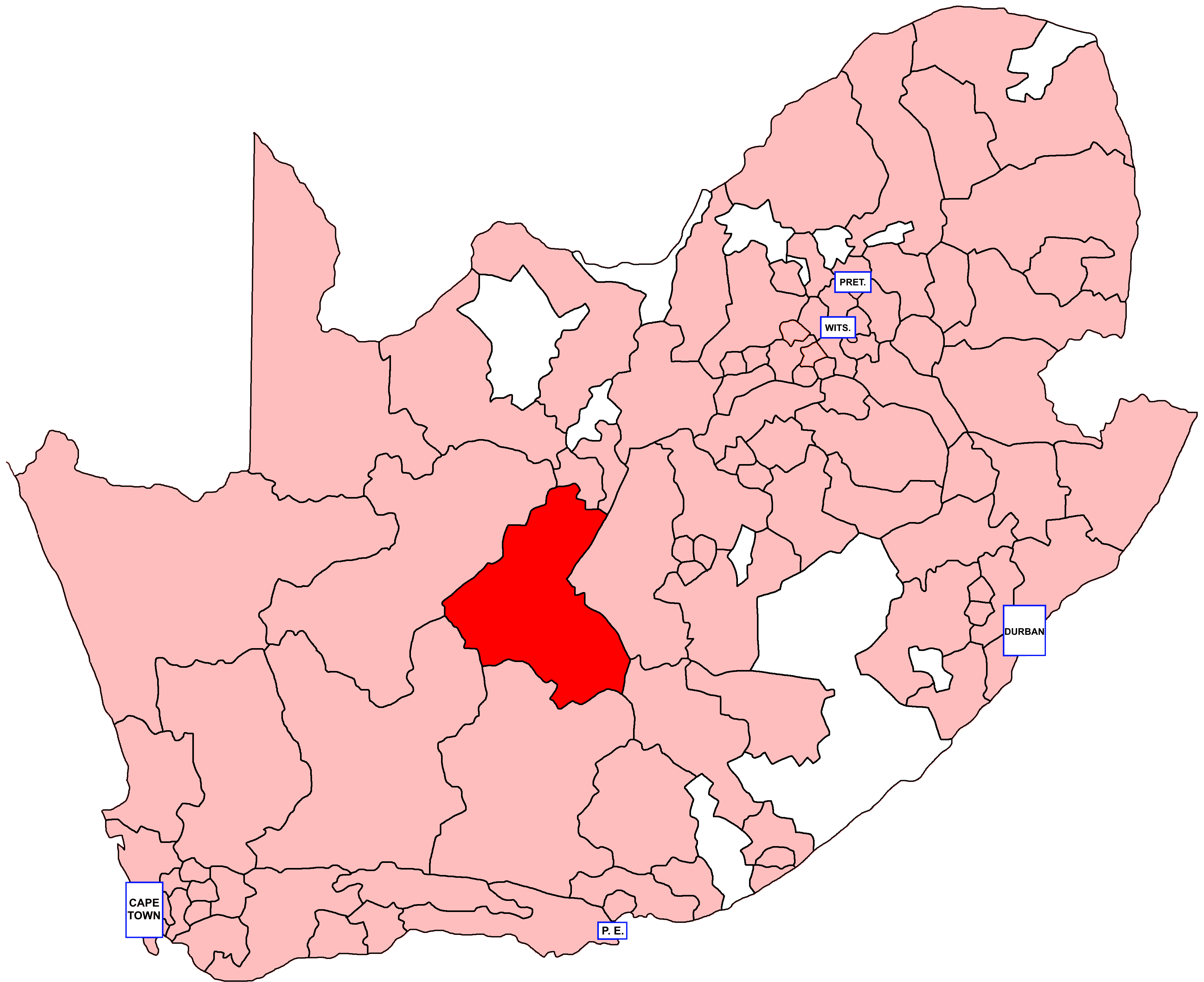
- Location of De Aar within South Africa (1981)
- Province: Cape of Good Hope
- Electorate: 9,998 (1989)

Former constituency
- Created: 1948
- Abolished: 1994
- Number of members: 1
- Last MHA: J. A. Jooste (NP)
- Replaced by: Northern Cape

De Aar (known as De Aar-Colesberg from 1948 to 1966) was a constituency in the Cape Province of South Africa, which existed from 1948 to 1994. It covered large area of the Karoo centred on the town of De Aar. Throughout its existence it elected one member to the House of Assembly and one to the Cape Provincial Council.

== Franchise notes ==
When the Union of South Africa was formed in 1910, the electoral qualifications in use in each pre-existing colony were kept in place. The Cape Colony had implemented a "colour-blind" franchise known as the Cape Qualified Franchise, which included all adult literate men owning more than £75 worth of property (controversially raised from £25 in 1892), and this initially remained in effect after the colony became the Cape Province. As of 1908, 22,784 out of 152,221 electors in the Cape Colony were "Native or Coloured". Eligibility to serve in Parliament and the Provincial Council, however, was restricted to whites from 1910 onward.

The first challenge to the Cape Qualified Franchise came with the Women's Enfranchisement Act, 1930 and the Franchise Laws Amendment Act, 1931, which extended the vote to women and removed property qualifications for the white population only – non-white voters remained subject to the earlier restrictions. In 1936, the Representation of Natives Act removed all black voters from the common electoral roll and introduced three "Native Representative Members", white MPs elected by the black voters of the province and meant to represent their interests in particular. A similar provision was made for Coloured voters with the Separate Representation of Voters Act, 1951, and although this law was challenged by the courts, it went into effect in time for the 1958 general election, which was thus held with all-white voter rolls for the first time in South African history. The all-white franchise would continue until the end of apartheid and the introduction of universal suffrage in 1994.

== History ==
Like many constituencies in the rural Cape, the electorate of De Aar was largely Afrikaans-speaking and conservative, and the seat was held throughout its existence by the governing National Party. Its first MP, F. H. Boltman, had previously represented Albert-Colesberg, and only sat for De Aar-Colesberg for two years. The winner of the 1950 by-election, Michiel Jacobus de la Rey Venter, would represent the seat until 1966, moving to the newly recreated Colesberg seat in that year’s election. When Colesberg was abolished again in 1974, its MP, R. F. van Heerden, moved to De Aar. National Party candidates generally held De Aar by large margins throughout this period, although the Conservative Party came close to taking the seat at the final whites-only general election in 1989.

== Members ==
| Election | Member | Party |
|---|---|---|
| 1948 | F. H. Boltman | HNP |
| 1950 by | M. J. de la R. Venter | National |
| 1953 | M. J. de la R. Venter | National |
| 1958 | M. J. de la R. Venter | National |
| 1961 | M. J. de la R. Venter | National |
| 1966 | L. P. J. Vorster | National |
| 1970 | L. P. J. Vorster | National |
| 1974 | R. F. van Heerden | National |
| 1977 | R. F. van Heerden | National |
| 1981 | R. F. van Heerden | National |
| 1987 | J. A. Jooste | National |
| 1989 | J. A. Jooste | National |
| 1994 | constituency abolished | |

== Detailed results ==
=== Elections in the 1940s ===
General election 1948: De Aar-Colesberg
| Party | Candidate | Votes | % | ±% |
|---|---|---|---|---|
| Reunited National | F. H. Boltman | 5,470 | 62.3 | New |
| United | D. A. S. Conroy | 3,312 | 37.7 | New |
| Majority | | 2,158 | 17.2 | N/A |
| Turnout | | 8,782 | 88.0 | N/A |
| Reunited National win (new seat) | | | | |
