= North Rand (House of Assembly of South Africa constituency) =

- Noordrand
- Former constituency for the South African House of Assembly
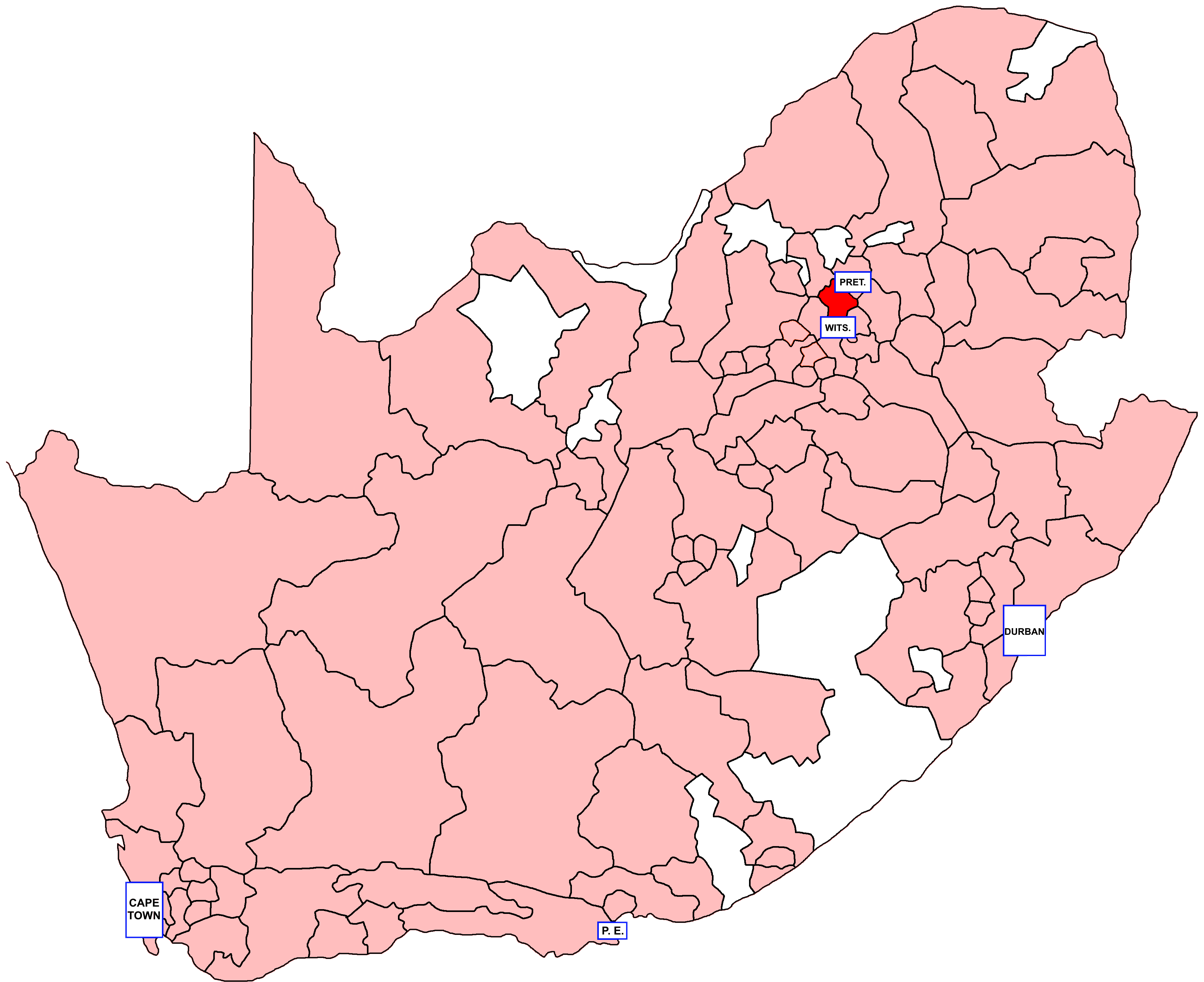
- Location of North Rand within South Africa (1981)
- Province: Transvaal
- Electorate: 43,637 (1989)

Former constituency
- Created: 1933; 1953; 1966; 1981
- Abolished: 1948; 1958; 1974; 1994
- Number of members: 1
- Last MHA: L. A. de Waal (DP)
- Created from: North East Rand (1933)
- Replaced by: Gauteng (1994)

North Rand (Afrikaans: Noordrand) was a constituency in the Transvaal Province of South Africa, which existed in four periods between 1933 and 1994. As the name implies, it covered the northern parts of the Witwatersrand conurbation. Throughout its existence it elected one member to the House of Assembly and one to the Transvaal Provincial Council.

== Franchise notes ==
When the Union of South Africa was formed in 1910, the electoral qualifications in use in each pre-existing colony were kept in place. In the Transvaal Colony, and its predecessor the South African Republic, the vote was restricted to white men, and as such, elections in the Transvaal Province were held on a whites-only franchise from the beginning. The franchise was also restricted by property and education qualifications until the 1933 general election, following the passage of the Women's Enfranchisement Act, 1930 and the Franchise Laws Amendment Act, 1931. From then on, the franchise was given to all white citizens aged 21 or over. Non-whites remained disenfranchised until the end of apartheid and the introduction of universal suffrage in 1994.

== History ==
As an outer suburban seat, North Rand tended to alternate between the main political tendencies in South Africa. For most of its history, it leaned toward the United Party, though not as strongly as other parts of Johannesburg. Its first MP, Gerhardus Coenraad Scheepers Heyns, was a member of the National Party and had previously represented the abolished constituency of North East Rand - in 1938, North East Rand returned to the map alongside North Rand, and Heyns moved back to his old seat. He had joined the United Party on its formation four years before, and all his successors in the first three iterations of the seat were members of that party, but when it returned for the fourth and last time in 1981, the UP no longer existed. Its largest successor, the Progressive Federal Party, contested the new seat, but lost to the Nationalist candidate. The NP held the seat in 1987, but in 1989, the Democratic Party captured it in a three-way race, with the Conservative Party also standing and splitting the conservative vote. As of the 1989 general election, North Rand was the largest constituency in South Africa by electorate, with over forty thousand voters - as many as were cast in the entire Transvaal at the first general election in 1910.

== Members ==
Election	Member	Party
1933	G. C. S. Heyns	National
1934	G. C. S. Heyns	United
1938	A. S. de Kock	United
1943	W. S. van Onselen	United
1948	Constituency abolished	

Election	Member	Party
1953	Blaar Coetzee	United
1958	Constituency abolished	

Election	Member	Party
1966	H. J. Bronkhorst	United
1970	H. J. Bronkhorst	United
1974	Constituency abolished	

Election	Member	Party
1981	J. C. B. Schoeman	National
1987	A. C. A. C. Grobler	National
1989	L. A. de Waal	Democratic
1994	Constituency abolished	

== Detailed results ==
=== Elections in the 1930s ===
General election 1933: North Rand
Party	Candidate	Votes	%	±%
National	G. C. S. Heyns	2,468	62.8	New
Roos	C. H. S. Potgieter	1,417	36.0	New
Rejected ballots		47	1.2	N/A
Majority		1,051	26.7	N/A
Turnout		3,932	66.9	N/A
National win (new seat)				

General election 1938: North Rand
Party	Candidate	Votes	%	±%
United	A. S. de Kock	3,343	55.9	N/A
Purified National	M. M. Jansen	1,392	23.3	New
Labour	A. E. Carlisle	1,222	20.4	New
Rejected ballots		23	0.4	N/A
Majority		1,357	32.6	N/A
Turnout		5,980	77.6	N/A
United hold		Swing	N/A	
