= Port Elizabeth South (House of Assembly of South Africa constituency) =

- Port Elizabeth-Suid
- Former constituency for the South African House of Assembly
- Province: Cape of Good Hope
- Electorate: 13,189 (1961)

Former constituency
- Created: 1924
- Abolished: 1966
- Number of members: 1
- Last MHA: R. P. Plewman (UP)
- Created from: Port Elizabeth Southwest
- Replaced by: Walmer

Port Elizabeth South (Afrikaans: Port Elizabeth-Suid) was a constituency in the Cape Province of South Africa, which existed from 1924 to 1966. As the name indicates, the seat covered the southern suburbs of Port Elizabeth (now Gqeberha). Throughout its existence it elected one member to the House of Assembly and one to the Cape Provincial Council.

== Franchise notes ==
When the Union of South Africa was formed in 1910, the electoral qualifications in use in each pre-existing colony were kept in place. The Cape Colony had implemented a "colour-blind" franchise known as the Cape Qualified Franchise, which included all adult literate men owning more than £75 worth of property (controversially raised from £25 in 1892), and this initially remained in effect after the colony became the Cape Province. As of 1908, 22,784 out of 152,221 electors in the Cape Colony were "Native or Coloured". Eligibility to serve in Parliament and the Provincial Council, however, was restricted to whites from 1910 onward.

The first challenge to the Cape Qualified Franchise came with the Women's Enfranchisement Act, 1930 and the Franchise Laws Amendment Act, 1931, which extended the vote to women and removed property qualifications for the white population only – non-white voters remained subject to the earlier restrictions. In 1936, the Representation of Natives Act removed all black voters from the common electoral roll and introduced three "Native Representative Members", white MPs elected by the black voters of the province and meant to represent their interests in particular. A similar provision was made for Coloured voters with the Separate Representation of Voters Act, 1951, and although this law was challenged by the courts, it went into effect in time for the 1958 general election, which was thus held with all-white voter rolls for the first time in South African history. The all-white franchise would continue until the end of apartheid and the introduction of universal suffrage in 1994.

== History ==
Like the rest of the Eastern Cape, Port Elizabeth South had a largely English-speaking electorate and was a stronghold of the pro-British side of South African politics. On its creation in 1924, it largely replaced the Port Elizabeth Southwest seat, and that seat's MP, William Macintosh of the South African Party, was elected to represent Port Elizabeth South. With the exception of the 1933 election, in which independent John Hirsch defeated incumbent SAP MP E. R. McIlwraith, the seat was won by the SAP and its successor the United Party at every election in which it was contested. In 1966, it was replaced by the new constituency of Walmer, which continued to be a UP stronghold for as long as the UP existed.

== Members ==
Election	Member	Party
1924	William Macintosh	South African
1929	William Macintosh	South African
1929 by	E. R. McIlwraith	South African
1933	John Hirsch	Independent
1938	John Hirsch	United
1943	James McLean	United
1948	H. O. Frielinghaus	United
1953	H. O. Frielinghaus	United
1958	H. O. Frielinghaus	United
1961	R. P. Plewman	United
1966	constituency abolished	

== Detailed results ==
=== Elections in the 1920s ===
General election 1924: Port Elizabeth South
Party	Candidate	Votes	%	±%
South African	William Macintosh	2,102	71.0	New
Labour	H. G. R. Theys	758	25.6	New
Rejected ballots		102	3.4	N/A
Majority		1,344	45.4	N/A
Turnout		2,962	80.0	N/A
South African win (new seat)				

General election 1929: Port Elizabeth South
Party	Candidate	Votes	%	±%
South African	William Macintosh	2,246	76.8	+5.8
Labour (Creswell)	E. J. Jordan	609	20.8	−4.8
Rejected ballots		71	2.4	-1.0
Majority		1,637	56.0	+10.6
Turnout		2,926	72.0	−8.0
South African hold		Swing	+5.3	

=== Elections in the 1930s ===
General election 1933: Port Elizabeth South
Party	Candidate	Votes	%	±%
Independent	John Hirsch	2,803	52.2	New
South African	E. R. McIlwraith	2,483	46.2	−30.6
Rejected ballots		85	1.6	-0.8
Majority		320	6.0	N/A
Turnout		5,371	74.0	+2.0
Independent gain from South African		Swing	N/A	

General election 1938: Port Elizabeth South
Party	Candidate	Votes	%	±%
United	John Hirsch	2,963	47.7	−11.7
Dominion	J. R. More	1,787	28.7	New
Independent	S. H. Kemp	1,448	23.3	New
Rejected ballots		18	0.3	-0.6
Majority		1,176	18.9	N/A
Turnout		6,216	75.4	+5.0
United hold		Swing	N/A	
