= North East Rand (House of Assembly of South Africa constituency) =

- Nordoos-Rand
- Former constituency for the South African House of Assembly
- Province: Transvaal
- Electorate: 10,176 (1958)

Former constituency
- Created: 1924; 1938; 1958
- Abolished: 1933; 1953; 1966
- Number of members: 1
- Last MHA: H. J. Bronkhorst (UP)
- Replaced by: North Rand (1966)

North East Rand (Afrikaans: Nordoos-Rand) was a constituency in the Transvaal Province of South Africa, which existed in three periods between 1924 and 1966. As the name implies, it covered the northeastern parts of the Witwatersrand conurbation. Throughout its existence it elected one member to the House of Assembly and one to the Transvaal Provincial Council.

== Franchise notes ==
When the Union of South Africa was formed in 1910, the electoral qualifications in use in each pre-existing colony were kept in place. In the Transvaal Colony, and its predecessor the South African Republic, the vote was restricted to white men, and as such, elections in the Transvaal Province were held on a whites-only franchise from the beginning. The franchise was also restricted by property and education qualifications until the 1933 general election, following the passage of the Women's Enfranchisement Act, 1930 and the Franchise Laws Amendment Act, 1931. From then on, the franchise was given to all white citizens aged 21 or over. Non-whites remained disenfranchised until the end of apartheid and the introduction of universal suffrage in 1994.

== History ==
As an outer suburban seat, North East Rand tended to alternate between the main political tendencies in South Africa. In its first two iterations, it was a marginal seat that leaned toward the National Party - the NP won every election, but usually by narrow margins. Its first MP, Hjalmar Reitz, moved to nearby Brits on that seat's creation in 1929, and Carel Stephanus Hendrik Potgieter held the seat for the NP until its abolition in 1933. Its recreation in 1938 saw it won by the United Party by a safe margin, and it became a bellwether, falling to the Herenigde Nasionale Party in 1948 amidst their nationwide victory, although again only narrowly. The seat was abolished again in 1953, but reappeared after just a single term in 1958. This time, it was a safe seat for the opposition United Party, which took it by a wide margin in 1958 and held it unopposed until its final abolition in 1966. Hendrik Johannes Bronkhorst, its final MP, moved to the North Rand seat on North East Rand's abolition.

== Members ==
| Election | Member | Party |
|---|---|---|
| 1924 | Hjalmar Reitz | National |
| 1929 | C. S. H. Potgieter | National |
| 1933 | Constituency abolished | |

| Election | Member | Party |
|---|---|---|
| 1938 | G. C. S. Heyns | United |
| 1943 | G. C. S. Heyns | United |
| 1948 | A. J. B. Deysel | HNP |
| 1953 | Constituency abolished | |

| Election | Member | Party |
|---|---|---|
| 1958 | A. I. D. Brown | United |
| 1960 by | H. J. Bronkhorst | United |
| 1961 | H. J. Bronkhorst | United |
| 1966 | Constituency abolished | |

== Detailed results ==
=== Elections in the 1920s ===
General election 1924: North East Rand
| Party | Candidate | Votes | % | ±% |
|---|---|---|---|---|
| National | Hjalmar Reitz | 1,203 | 53.8 | New |
| South African | H. J. Hofmeyr | 1,027 | 45.9 | New |
| Rejected ballots | | 8 | 0.3 | N/A |
| Majority | | 176 | 7.9 | N/A |
| Turnout | | 2,238 | 81.3 | N/A |
| National win (new seat) | | | | |

General election 1929: North East Rand
| Party | Candidate | Votes | % | ±% |
|---|---|---|---|---|
| National | C. S. H. Potgieter | 1,095 | 51.2 | −2.6 |
| South African | G. J. Stoop | 880 | 41.1 | −4.8 |
| Labour (N.C.) | H. E. W. C. Barrett | 140 | 6.5 | New |
| Rejected ballots | | 25 | 1.2 | +0.9 |
| Majority | | 176 | 10.1 | +2.2 |
| Turnout | | 2,140 | 78.5 | −2.8 |
| National hold | | Swing | +1.1 | |

=== Elections in the 1930s ===
General election 1938: North East Rand
| Party | Candidate | Votes | % | ±% |
|---|---|---|---|---|
| United | G. C. S. Heyns | 3,608 | 69.0 | New |
| Purified National | F. D. van Alphen | 1,569 | 30.0 | New |
| Rejected ballots | | 49 | 1.0 | N/A |
| Majority | | 2,039 | 39.0 | N/A |
| Turnout | | 5,226 | 71.3 | N/A |
| United win (new seat) | | | | |
