= Port Elizabeth Southwest (House of Assembly of South Africa constituency) =

- Port Elizabeth-Suidwes
- Former constituency for the South African House of Assembly
- Province: Cape of Good Hope
- Electorate: 4,205 (1921)

Former constituency
- Created: 1910
- Abolished: 1924
- Number of members: 1
- Last MHA: William Macintosh (SAP)
- Replaced by: Port Elizabeth South

Port Elizabeth Southwest (Afrikaans: Port Elizabeth-Suidwes) was a constituency in the Cape Province of South Africa, which existed from 1910 to 1924. As the name indicates, the seat covered the southern and western suburbs of Port Elizabeth (now Gqeberha). Throughout its existence it elected one member to the House of Assembly and one to the Cape Provincial Council.

== Franchise notes ==
When the Union of South Africa was formed in 1910, the electoral qualifications in use in each pre-existing colony were kept in place. The Cape Colony had implemented a "colour-blind" franchise known as the Cape Qualified Franchise, which included all adult literate men owning more than £75 worth of property (controversially raised from £25 in 1892), and this initially remained in effect after the colony became the Cape Province. As of 1908, 22,784 out of 152,221 electors in the Cape Colony were "Native or Coloured". Eligibility to serve in Parliament and the Provincial Council, however, was restricted to whites from 1910 onward.

The first challenge to the Cape Qualified Franchise came with the Women's Enfranchisement Act, 1930 and the Franchise Laws Amendment Act, 1931, which extended the vote to women and removed property qualifications for the white population only – non-white voters remained subject to the earlier restrictions. In 1936, the Representation of Natives Act removed all black voters from the common electoral roll and introduced three "Native Representative Members", white MPs elected by the black voters of the province and meant to represent their interests in particular. A similar provision was made for Coloured voters with the Separate Representation of Voters Act, 1951, and although this law was challenged by the courts, it went into effect in time for the 1958 general election, which was thus held with all-white voter rolls for the first time in South African history. The all-white franchise would continue until the end of apartheid and the introduction of universal suffrage in 1994.

== History ==
Like the rest of the Eastern Cape, Port Elizabeth Southwest had a largely English-speaking electorate and was a stronghold of the pro-British side of South African politics. At the inaugural Union election in 1910, independent candidate James Searle was elected unopposed, but every subsequent election was won by Sir William Macintosh, who stood first as a Unionist and then, following the Unionist Party’s merger into the South African Party in 1921, representing that party. In 1924, following boundary changes, the seat was renamed Port Elizabeth South, and Macintosh stood for and won the new seat.

== Members ==
Election	Member	Party
1910	James Searle	Independent
1915	William Macintosh	Unionist
1920	William Macintosh	Unionist
1921	William Macintosh	South African
1924	constituency abolished	

== Detailed results ==
=== Elections in the 1910s ===
General election 1910: Port Elizabeth Southwest
Party	Candidate	Votes	%	±%
Independent	James Searle	Unopposed		
Independent win (new seat)				

General election 1915: Port Elizabeth Southwest
Party	Candidate	Votes	%	±%
Unionist	William Macintosh	1,855	75.7	New
Labour	A. J. C. Webb	596	24.3	New
Majority		1,259	51.4	N/A
Turnout		2,451	74.0	N/A
Unionist gain from Independent		Swing	N/A	

=== Elections in the 1920s ===
General election 1920: Port Elizabeth Southwest
Party	Candidate	Votes	%	±%
Unionist	William Macintosh	1,750	70.1	−5.6
Labour	A. J. C. Webb	748	29.9	+5.6
Majority		1,002	40.2	−11.2
Turnout		2,498	61.5	−12.5
Unionist hold		Swing	-5.6	

General election 1921: Port Elizabeth Southwest
Party	Candidate	Votes	%	±%
South African	William Macintosh	1,853	78.0	+7.9
Labour	W. W. Jennings	523	22.0	−7.9
Majority		1,330	56.0	+15.8
Turnout		2,376	56.5	−5.0
South African hold		Swing	+7.9	
