= Ryno King =

South African politician

Member of the National Assembly
- In office 23 April 2004 – May 2009
- Constituency: Western Cape

Personal details
- Born: Ryno Johannes King; 26 August 1947 (age 78)
- Citizenship: South Africa
- Party: Democratic Alliance (since March 2003)
- Other political affiliations: New National Party (until March 2003)

Ryno Johannes King (born 26 August 1947) is a South African politician who served the Western Cape in the National Assembly from 2004 to 2009. Before that, he served in the Western Cape Provincial Parliament. He was a member of the New National Party (NNP) until March 2003, when he crossed the floor to the Democratic Alliance (DA).

== Legislative career ==
King was elected to an NNP seat in the Western Cape Provincial Parliament in 1999 and served as the party's chief whip in the legislature for part of the legislative term that followed. During the floor-crossing window of March 2003, he joined Alta Rossouw and Gerhard van Rensburg in defecting from the NNP to the DA.

In the 2004 general election, King was elected to the National Assembly under the DA's banner. He represented the Western Cape constituency and was the DA's spokesperson on rural safety. He did not stand for re-election in 2009.
