= John Hirsch (sportsman) =

South African rugby union player and cricketer

Personal information
- Full name: John Gauntlett Hirsch
- Born: 20 February 1883; Port Elizabeth, Cape Province, South Africa
- Died: 26 February 1958 (aged 75); Wynberg, Cape Province, South Africa
- Batting: Unknown
- Bowling: Unknown

Domestic team information
- Years: Team
- 1903–1904: Cambridge University
- 1903–1904: London County

Career statistics
Competition	First-class
Matches	6
Runs scored	166
Batting average	15.09
100s/50s	–/1
Top score	56
Balls bowled	144
Wickets	1
Bowling average	93.00
5 wickets in innings	–
10 wickets in match	–
Best bowling	1/41
Catches/stumpings	4/–
- Source: Cricinfo, 30 December 2021

John Gauntlett Hirsch (20 February 1883 – 26 February 1958) was a South African rugby union international and first-class cricketer.

Hirsch was born at Port Elizabeth in February 1883. He was educated in England at Shrewsbury School, where he played cricket, football and rugby union for the school. From Shrewsbury, he went up to Clare College at the University of Cambridge, where he studied history. While studying at Cambridge, he played first-class cricket for Cambridge University Cricket Club in 1903 and 1904, making four appearances. He also made two appearances during the same period for London County, captained by W. G. Grace. In six first-class matches, Hirsch scored 144 runs at an average of 15.09 and a high score of 56, which was his only first-class half century. He played rugby union for Cambridge University R.U.F.C., with marked success.

After graduating from Cambridge, Hirsch returned to South Africa where he played rugby for Eastern Province. He impressed enough to be selected for the South African team for their 1906–07 tour of Europe as a three-quarter back, playing one Test match on the tour against Ireland at Belfast. He later made a second Test match appearance against Great Britain at Johannesburg. Hirsch died at Wynberg in February 1958.
