= Wepener (House of Assembly of South Africa constituency) =

- Former constituency for the South African House of Assembly
- Province: Orange Free State
- Electorate: 2,559 (1929)

Former constituency
- Created: 1924
- Abolished: 1938
- Number of members: 1
- Last MHA: J. C. de Wet (UP)
- Created from: Rouxville
- Replaced by: Ladybrand

Wepener was a constituency in the Orange Free State Province of South Africa, which existed from 1924 to 1938. Named after the town of Wepener, the seat covered a rural area in the southeast of the province, bordering Lesotho. Throughout its existence, it elected one member to the House of Assembly.

== Franchise notes ==
When the Union of South Africa was formed in 1910, the electoral qualifications in use in each pre-existing colony were kept in place. In the Orange River Colony, and its predecessor the Orange Free State, the vote was restricted to white men, and as such, elections in the Orange Free State Province were held on a whites-only franchise from the beginning. The franchise was also restricted by property and education qualifications until the 1933 general election, following the passage of the Women's Enfranchisement Act, 1930 and the Franchise Laws Amendment Act, 1931. From then on, the franchise was given to all white citizens aged 21 or over. Non-whites remained disenfranchised until the end of apartheid and the introduction of universal suffrage in 1994.

== History ==
Like most of the Orange Free State, Wepener was a highly conservative seat and had a largely Afrikaans-speaking electorate. All three elections contested in the seat were won by the National Party, whose candidates never got below seventy percent of the vote. In 1933, like many incumbent MPs across South Africa, Wepener MP Jan Cloete de Wet was re-elected unopposed, and in 1934 he followed J. B. M. Hertzog and the majority of Nationalists into the United Party. Wepener was abolished for the 1938 general election, but de Wet stood for election in neighbouring Ladybrand, whose MP C. R. Swart had sided with the hardline Purified National Party. In the battle of incumbents, de Wet was narrowly victorious, and represented Ladybrand for the next five years.

== Members ==
Election	Member	Party
1924	Daniël Hugo	National
1929	F. D. du Toit	National
1933	J. C. de Wet	National
1934	J. C. de Wet	United
1938	constituency abolished	

== Detailed results ==
=== Elections in the 1920s ===
General election 1924: Wepener
Party	Candidate	Votes	%	±%
National	Daniël Hugo	1,464	74.5	New
South African	G. J. van der Riet	483	24.6	New
Rejected ballots		18	0.9	N/A
Majority		981	49.9	N/A
Turnout		2,014	59.4	N/A
National win (new seat)				

General election 1929: Wepener
Party	Candidate	Votes	%	±%
National	F. D. du Toit	1,466	77.1	+2.6
South African	G. L. Steytler	415	21.8	−2.8
Rejected ballots		20	1.1	+0.2
Majority		1,051	55.3	+5.4
Turnout		1,901	74.3	+14.9
National hold		Swing	+2.7	

=== Elections in the 1930s ===
General election 1933: Wepener
Party	Candidate	Votes	%	±%
National	J. C. de Wet	Unopposed		
National hold				
