= Kimberley (House of Assembly of South Africa constituency) =

South African constituency, 1910–1958

- Former constituency for the South African House of Assembly
- Province: Cape of Good Hope
- Electorate: 11,934 (1953)

Former constituency
- Created: 1910
- Abolished: 1958
- Number of members: 1
- Last MHA: Harry Oppenheimer (UP)
- Replaced by: Kimberley North; Kimberley South

Kimberley (known as Kimberley City (Afrikaans: Kimberley-Stad) after 1938) was a constituency in the Cape Province of South Africa, which existed from 1910 to 1958. It covered much of the urban area of its namesake city, latterly the capital of the Northern Cape province. Throughout its existence it elected one member to the House of Assembly and one to the Cape Provincial Council.

== Franchise notes ==
When the Union of South Africa was formed in 1910, the electoral qualifications in use in each pre-existing colony were kept in place. The Cape Colony had implemented a “colour-blind” franchise known as the Cape Qualified Franchise, which included all adult literate men owning more than £75 worth of property (controversially raised from £25 in 1892), and this initially remained in effect after the colony became the Cape Province. As of 1908, 22,784 out of 152,221 electors in the Cape Colony were “Native or Coloured”. Eligibility to serve in Parliament and the Provincial Council, however, was restricted to whites from 1910 onward.

The first challenge to the Cape Qualified Franchise came with the Women's Enfranchisement Act, 1930 and the Franchise Laws Amendment Act, 1931, which extended the vote to women and removed property qualifications for the white population only – non-white voters remained subject to the earlier restrictions. In 1936, the Representation of Natives Act removed all black voters from the common electoral roll and introduced three “Native Representative Members”, white MPs elected by the black voters of the province and meant to represent their interests in particular. A similar provision was made for Coloured voters with the Separate Representation of Voters Act, 1951, and although this law was challenged by the courts, it went into effect in time for the 1958 general election, which was thus held with all-white voter rolls for the first time in South African history. The all-white franchise would continue until the end of apartheid and the introduction of universal suffrage in 1994.

== History ==
As the original centre of South Africa's diamond mining industry, Kimberley had a strong British presence from its founding, and this was reflected in the seat's politics. Its electorate, unusually for the Northern Cape, always tended to favour the more liberal and pro-British side of South African politics, first the Unionist Party, then the South African Party and finally the United Party – these parties held Kimberley throughout its existence. The Oppenheimer family, who controlled the De Beers and Anglo American mining conglomerates, were heavily involved both in Kimberley's economy and its politics: Ernest Oppenheimer represented the seat from 1924 until 1938, and his son Harry from 1948 until its abolition in 1958. In that year, Kimberley's constituencies were realigned to split the city down the middle, and the new Kimberley North and South seats were both won by the governing National Party.

== Members ==
Election	Member	Party
1910	H. A. Oliver	Unionist
1915	H. A. Oliver	Unionist
1920	H. A. Oliver	Unionist
1921	H. A. Oliver	South African
1924	Ernest Oppenheimer	South African
1929	Ernest Oppenheimer	South African
1933	Ernest Oppenheimer	South African
1934	Ernest Oppenheimer	United
1938	W. B. Humphreys	United
1943	W. B. Humphreys	United
1948	Harry Oppenheimer	United
1953	Harry Oppenheimer	United
1958	constituency abolished	

== Detailed results ==
=== Elections in the 1910s ===
General election 1910: Kimberley
Party	Candidate	Votes	%	±%
Unionist	H. A. Oliver	1,121	65.7	New
Labour	J. F. Trembath	584	34.3	New
Majority		537	31.4	N/A
Unionist win (new seat)				

General election 1915: Kimberley
Party	Candidate	Votes	%	±%
Unionist	H. A. Oliver	1,434	73.5	+7.8
Labour	Frederic Creswell	516	26.5	−7.8
Majority		918	47.0	+15.6
Turnout		1,950	63.4	N/A
Unionist hold		Swing	+7.8	

=== Elections in the 1920s ===
General election 1920: Kimberley
Party	Candidate	Votes	%	±%
Unionist	H. A. Oliver	1,574	61.2	−12.3
Labour	J. Wills	821	31.9	+5.4
Independent	F. Hicks	179	7.0	New
Majority		753	29.3	−17.7
Turnout		2,574	66.3	+2.9
Unionist hold		Swing	-8.9	

General election 1921: Kimberley
Party	Candidate	Votes	%	±%
South African	H. A. Oliver	1,557	61.5	+0.3
Labour	J. Wills	976	38.5	+6.6
Majority		581	23.0	−6.3
Turnout		2,533	64.3	−2.0
South African hold		Swing	-3.2	

General election 1924: Kimberley
Party	Candidate	Votes	%	±%
South African	Ernest Oppenheimer	1,984	67.4	+5.9
Labour	S. B. Kitchin	925	31.2	−7.1
Rejected ballots		35	1.2	N/A
Majority		1,059	36.2	+13.2
Turnout		2,944	80.7	+16.4
South African hold		Swing	+6.6	

General election 1929: Kimberley
Party	Candidate	Votes	%	±%
South African	Ernest Oppenheimer	2,044	63.1	−4.3
National	A. M. M. Hartmann	1,132	34.9	New
Independent	J. Willis	9	0.3	New
Rejected ballots		55	1.7	+0.5
Majority		912	28.2	N/A
Turnout		3,240	83.6	+2.9
South African hold		Swing	N/A	

=== Elections in the 1930s ===
General election 1933: Kimberley
Party	Candidate	Votes	%	±%
South African	Ernest Oppenheimer	Unopposed		
South African hold				

General election 1938: Kimberley City
Party	Candidate	Votes	%	±%
United	W. B. Humphreys	4,782	70.9	N/A
Purified National	P. J. Olivier	1,866	27.7	New
Rejected ballots		96	1.4	N/A
Majority		2,916	43.2	N/A
Turnout		6,744	79.8	N/A
United hold		Swing	N/A	
