= Worcester (House of Assembly of South Africa constituency) =

South African constituency, 1910–1994

- Former constituency for the South African House of Assembly
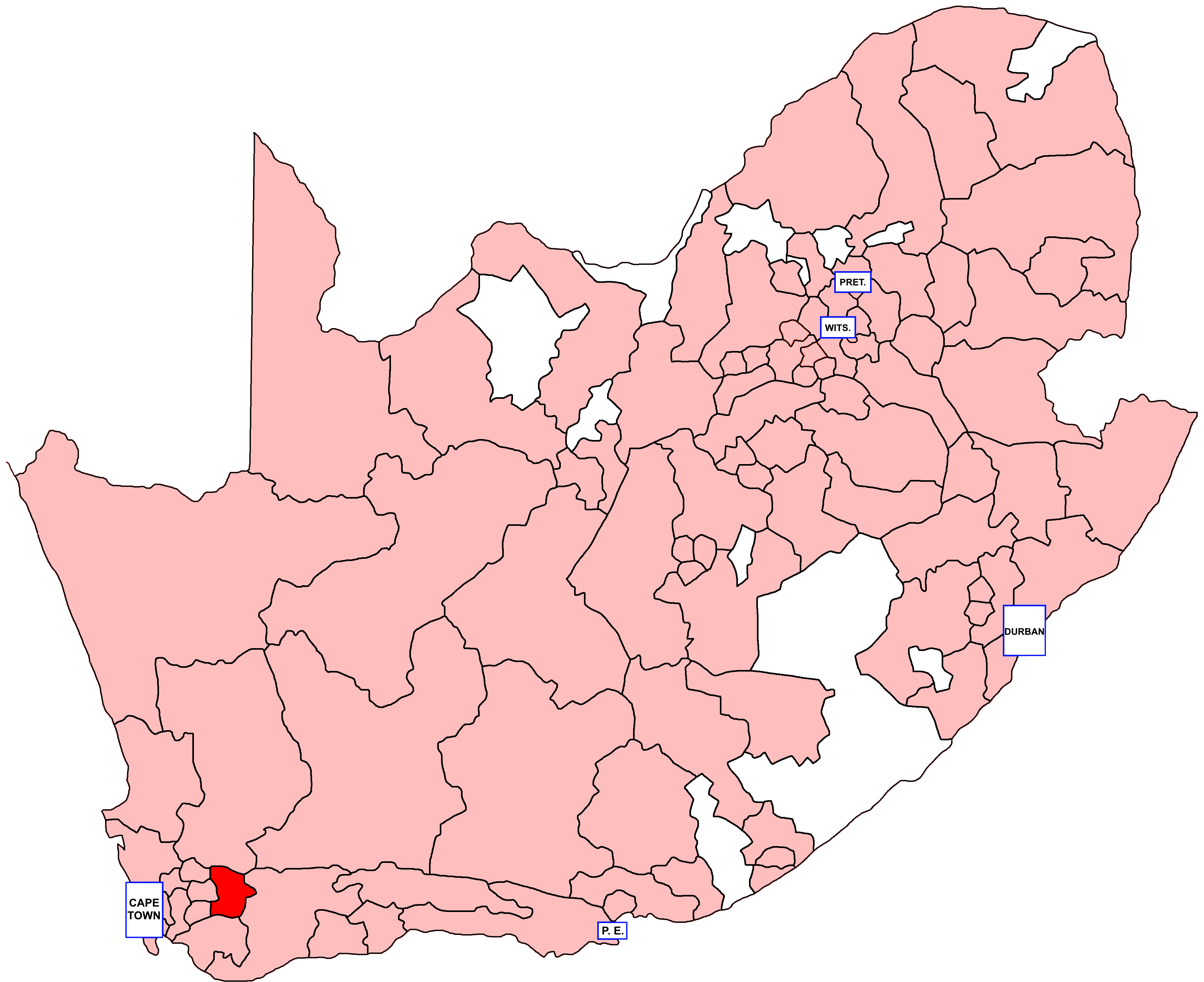
- Location of Worcester within South Africa (1981)
- Province: Cape of Good Hope
- Electorate: 15,227 (1989)

Former constituency
- Created: 1910
- Abolished: 1994
- Number of members: 1
- Last MHA: Ryno King (NP)
- Replaced by: Western Cape

Worcester was a constituency in the Cape Province of South Africa, which existed from 1910 to 1994. The constituency covered a part of the Boland region centred on the town of Worcester. Throughout its existence it elected one member to the House of Assembly and one to the Cape Provincial Council.

== Franchise notes ==
When the Union of South Africa was formed in 1910, the electoral qualifications in use in each pre-existing colony were kept in place. The Cape Colony had implemented a “colour-blind” franchise known as the Cape Qualified Franchise, which included all adult literate men owning more than £75 worth of property (controversially raised from £25 in 1892), and this initially remained in effect after the colony became the Cape Province. As of 1908, 22,784 out of 152,221 electors in the Cape Colony were “Native or Coloured”. Eligibility to serve in Parliament and the Provincial Council, however, was restricted to whites from 1910 onward.

The first challenge to the Cape Qualified Franchise came with the Women's Enfranchisement Act, 1930 and the Franchise Laws Amendment Act, 1931, which extended the vote to women and removed property qualifications for the white population only – non-white voters remained subject to the earlier restrictions. In 1936, the Representation of Natives Act removed all black voters from the common electoral roll and introduced three “Native Representative Members”, white MPs elected by the black voters of the province and meant to represent their interests in particular. A similar provision was made for Coloured voters with the Separate Representation of Voters Act, 1951, and although this law was challenged by the courts, it went into effect in time for the 1958 general election, which was thus held with all-white voter rolls for the first time in South African history. The all-white franchise would continue until the end of apartheid and the introduction of universal suffrage in 1994.

== History ==
Worcester, like the rest of the Western Cape, started out as a safe seat for the South African Party and over time gradually became a safe seat for the National Party. For the first twenty years of its existence, Worcester was represented by C. B. Heatlie of the SAP, but after his retirement in 1933, it became marginal, switching hands at every election until 1948. In that year, its longest-serving MP, Eben Dönges, was first elected. Dönges served as Minister of the Interior during the implementation of apartheid, and was frequently tipped as a candidate for the premiership. He retired from parliament in 1967 after being elected State President, but had a stroke shortly thereafter and never assumed the office. By that time, Worcester had become a safe Nationalist seat, and the governing party would hold it until the end of apartheid.

== Members ==
Election	Member	Party
1910	C. B. Heatlie	South African
1915	C. B. Heatlie	South African
1920	C. B. Heatlie	South African
1921	C. B. Heatlie	South African
1924	C. B. Heatlie	South African
1929	C. B. Heatlie	South African
1933	J. E. J. Krige	South African
1934	J. E. J. Krige	United
1938	Gideon van Zyl Wolfaard	GNP
1943	P. J. de Wet	United
1948	Eben Dönges	HNP
1953	Eben Dönges	National
1958	Eben Dönges	National
1961	Eben Dönges	National
1966	Eben Dönges	National
1967 by	L. F. Stofberg	National
1970	P. D. Palm	National
1974	P. D. Palm	National
1977	P. D. Palm	National
1979 by	J. Rabie	National
1981	J. Rabie	National
1987	J. Rabie	National
1989	Ryno King	National
1994	constituency abolished	

== Detailed results ==
=== Elections in the 1910s ===
General election 1910: Worcester
Party	Candidate	Votes	%	±%
South African	C. B. Heatlie	Unopposed		
South African win (new seat)				

General election 1915: Worcester
Party	Candidate	Votes	%	±%
South African	C. B. Heatlie	1,872	66.7	+5.4
National	J. N. Louw	934	33.3	New
Majority		938	33.4	N/A
Turnout		2,806	86.4	N/A
South African hold		Swing	N/A	

=== Elections in the 1920s ===
General election 1920: Worcester
Party	Candidate	Votes	%	±%
South African	C. B. Heatlie	1,747	57.1	−9.6
National	A. J. Stals	1,315	42.9	+9.6
Majority		432	14.2	−19.2
Turnout		3,062	83.6	−2.8
South African hold		Swing	-9.6	

General election 1921: Worcester
Party	Candidate	Votes	%	±%
South African	C. B. Heatlie	1,915	57.3	+0.2
National	A. J. Stals	1,429	42.7	−0.2
Majority		486	14.6	+0.4
Turnout		3,344	83.7	+0.1
South African hold		Swing	+0.2	

General election 1924: Worcester
Party	Candidate	Votes	%	±%
South African	C. B. Heatlie	1,966	52.3	−5.0
National	G. van Z. Wolfaard	1,766	47.0	+4.3
Rejected ballots		27	0.8	N/A
Majority		200	5.3	−9.3
Turnout		3,759	90.9	+7.2
South African hold		Swing	-4.7	

General election 1929: Worcester
Party	Candidate	Votes	%	±%
South African	C. B. Heatlie	1,719	51.3	−1.0
National	J. H. Conradie	1,599	47.7	+0.7
Rejected ballots		32	1.1	+0.3
Majority		120	3.6	−1.7
Turnout		3,350	90.3	−0.6
South African hold		Swing	-0.9	

=== Elections in the 1930s ===
General election 1933: Worcester
Party	Candidate	Votes	%	±%
South African	J. E. J. Krige	Unopposed		
South African hold				

General election 1938: Worcester
Party	Candidate	Votes	%	±%
Purified National	G. van Z. Wolfaard	3,540	50.4	New
United	J. E. J. Krige	3,432	48.9	N/A
Rejected ballots		47	0.7	N/A
Majority		108	1.5	N/A
Turnout		7,019	90.8	N/A
Purified National gain from United		Swing	N/A	
