= Rouxville (House of Assembly of South Africa constituency) =

- Former constituency for the South African House of Assembly
- Province: Orange Free State
- Electorate: 3,028 (1921)

Former constituency
- Created: 1910
- Abolished: 1924
- Number of members: 1
- Last MHA: Daniël Hugo (NP)
- Replaced by: Smithfield; Wepener

Rouxville was a constituency in the Orange Free State Province of South Africa, which existed from 1910 to 1924. Named after the town of Rouxville, the seat covered a rural area in the south of the province, along the border with the Cape Province and Lesotho. Throughout its existence it elected one member to the House of Assembly.

== Franchise notes ==
When the Union of South Africa was formed in 1910, the electoral qualifications in use in each pre-existing colony were kept in place. In the Orange River Colony, and its predecessor the Orange Free State, the vote was restricted to white men, and as such, elections in the Orange Free State Province were held on a whites-only franchise from the beginning. The franchise was also restricted by property and education qualifications until the 1933 general election, following the passage of the Women's Enfranchisement Act, 1930 and the Franchise Laws Amendment Act, 1931. From then on, the franchise was given to all white citizens aged 21 or over. Non-whites remained disenfranchised until the end of apartheid and the introduction of universal suffrage in 1994.

== History ==
Rouxville, like most of the Orange Free State, was a highly conservative seat throughout its existence and had a largely Afrikaans-speaking electorate. Its first MP, George Louis Steytler, was elected for the provincial Orangia Unie party, which swept the province in the first Union elections in 1910. In 1915, again like most of the Free State, it fell to the National Party, whose leader J. B. M. Hertzog enjoyed widespread popularity in the province. Daniël Hugo of the NP would represent the seat for the remainder of its existence, despite attempts by Steytler to regain it for the South African Party. In 1924, the constituency was abolished, with Rouxville itself being merged with Hertzog's seat of Smithfield, while Hugo stood for and won the new seat of Wepener.

== Members ==
Election	Member	Party
1910	G. L. Steytler	Orangia Unie
1915	Daniël Hugo	National
1920	Daniël Hugo	National
1921	Daniël Hugo	National
1924	constituency abolished	

== Detailed results ==
=== Elections in the 1910s ===
General election 1910: Rouxville
Party	Candidate	Votes	%	±%
Orangia Unie	G. L. Steytler	Unopposed		
Orangia Unie win (new seat)				

General election 1915: Rouxville
Party	Candidate	Votes	%	±%
National	Daniël Hugo	1,190	72.6	New
South African	H. F. D. Papenfus	449	27.4	N/A
Majority		741	45.2	N/A
Turnout		1,639	70.1	N/A
National gain from South African		Swing	N/A	

=== Elections in the 1920s ===
General election 1920: Rouxville
Party	Candidate	Votes	%	±%
National	Daniël Hugo	1,367	75.3	+2.7
South African	G. L. Steytler	449	24.7	−2.7
Majority		918	50.6	+5.4
Turnout		1,816	62.1	−8.0
National hold		Swing	+2.7	

General election 1921: Rouxville
Party	Candidate	Votes	%	±%
National	Daniël Hugo	1,389	76.4	+1.1
South African	G. L. Steytler	428	23.6	−1.1
Majority		961	52.8	+2.2
Turnout		1,817	60.0	−2.1
National hold		Swing	+1.1	
