= Delarey (House of Assembly of South Africa constituency) =

- Former constituency for the South African House of Assembly
- Province: Transvaal
- Electorate: 5,317 (1938)

Former constituency
- Created: 1924
- Abolished: 1943
- Number of members: 1
- Last MHA: J. S. Labuschagne (UP)
- Created from: Christiana

Delarey was a constituency in the Transvaal Province of South Africa, which existed from 1924 to 1943. It covered a rural area in the western Transvaal, centred on the town of Delareyville. Throughout its existence it elected one member to the House of Assembly and one to the Transvaal Provincial Council.

== Franchise notes ==
When the Union of South Africa was formed in 1910, the electoral qualifications in use in each pre-existing colony were kept in place. In the Transvaal Colony, and its predecessor the South African Republic, the vote was restricted to white men, and as such, elections in the Transvaal Province were held on a whites-only franchise from the beginning. The franchise was also restricted by property and education qualifications until the 1933 general election, following the passage of the Women's Enfranchisement Act, 1930 and the Franchise Laws Amendment Act, 1931. From then on, the franchise was given to all white citizens aged 21 or over. Non-whites remained disenfranchised until the end of apartheid and the introduction of universal suffrage in 1994.

== History ==
Like most of the rural Transvaal, Carolina was a conservative seat with a largely Afrikaans-speaking electorate. It was initially a safe seat for the National Party, and its first MP was Albert Strachan van Hees, who had previously represented nearby Christiana, and was elected by a comfortable margin at Delarey's inaugural election in 1924. Five years later, he moved to Brakpan, and the NP nominated Lodewyk Martinus Wentzel, who was likewise comfortably elected. After the 1933 general election, J. B. M. Hertzog and Jan Smuts joined forces to create the United Party, and Wentzel came along. He left parliament in 1935, and the resulting by-election was won by party colleague Johannes Stephanus Labuschagne, who represented Delarey until its abolition in 1943, defeating Purified National Party challengers handily throughout. After the seat's abolition, Labuschagne went on to represent Klip River and Vryburg.

== Members ==
Election	Member	Party
1924	A. S. van Hees	National
1929	L. M. Wentzel	National
1933	L. M. Wentzel	National
1934	L. M. Wentzel	United
1935 by	J. S. Labuschagne	United
1938	J. S. Labuschagne	United
1943	Constituency abolished	

== Detailed results ==
=== Elections in the 1920s ===
General election 1924: Delarey
Party	Candidate	Votes	%	±%
National	A. S. van Hees	1,053	65.3	New
South African	J. A. du Plessis	555	34.4	New
Rejected ballots		4	0.3	N/A
Majority		498	30.9	N/A
Turnout		1,612	73.5	N/A
National win (new seat)				

General election 1929: Delarey
Party	Candidate	Votes	%	±%
National	L. M. Wentzel	1,343	65.1	−0.2
South African	A. P. Visser	703	34.1	−0.3
Rejected ballots		16	0.8	+0.5
Majority		640	31.0	+0.1
Turnout		2,062	81.0	+7.5
National hold		Swing	+0.1	

=== Elections in the 1930s ===
General election 1933: Delarey
Party	Candidate	Votes	%	±%
National	L. M. Wentzel	Unopposed		
National hold				

Delarey by-election, 27 November 1935
Party	Candidate	Votes	%	±%
United	J. S. Labuschagne	2,309	61.6	New
Purified National	H. A. L. Theron	1,419	37.8	New
Rejected ballots		23	0.6	N/A
Majority		890	23.7	N/A
Turnout		3,751	78.3	N/A
United hold		Swing	N/A	

General election 1938: Delarey
Party	Candidate	Votes	%	±%
United	J. S. Labuschagne	2,849	59.9	N/A
Purified National	C. J. Claassen	1,869	39.3	New
Rejected ballots		39	0.8	N/A
Majority		980	20.6	N/A
Turnout		4,757	89.5	N/A
United hold		Swing	N/A	
