= William Benbow Humphreys =

South African politician

William Benbow Humphreys (1889-1965), City Councillor in Kimberley, Member of the Cape Provincial Council, and Member of Parliament (for Beaconsfield and afterwards for Kimberley), was the founder of the William Humphreys Art Gallery in Kimberley. He became, in 1961, the second recipient of the Freedom of the City of Kimberley. Humphreys was born in Oudtshoorn on 5 April 1889 and died in Kimberley on 25 July 1965.

== Early life ==
He was born in Oudtshoorn and at six months old moved to Kimberley with his family. He was educated at Kimberley Boys' High School, matriculating there in 1908.

Humphreys graduated from the Elsenburg Agricultural Training Institute, Stellenbosch, and moved to Campbell district west of Kimberley. He worked with his father, S.B. Humphreys, who was a general dealer and produce merchant in Giddy Street, Kimberley.

In 1910 he married Maude Elizabeth Searle, born in 1890. They had six children.

== Political career ==
He was elected to the Kimberley City Council in 1917, and became a Member of the Cape Provincial Council in 1927, when he also retired from the family business. In 1929 years later he was elected to the Union Parliament as the representative for Beaconsfield, one of the Kimberley constituencies, succeeding David Harris.

In 1933 he was returned to the Beaconsfield seat unopposed, as the coalition candidate of the South African Party.

When Sir Ernest Oppenheimer's retired from Parliament in 1938, Humphreys took over the Kimberley seat. In 1948 he retired from politics.

== Art collector and the founding of the William Humphreys Art Gallery ==
His art collection included paintings, sculpture, old furniture and objets d'art that he bought in Europe. His home, Benbow Lodge, including a purpose-built gallery for his art, much of which was from the Dutch and Flemish schools of the 17th century.

In 1948 Humphreys donated a part of his collection to the people of Kimberley and the Northern Cape. This collection, known as Humphreys’ Bequest, comprising a selection of European and British paintings, furniture and contemporary copies of classical sculptures, was initially housed at the Northern Cape Technical College. The terms of the donation stipulated that a suitable gallery should be built as a more permanent home for the collection, with Humphreys giving money towards the building costs. On 5 June 1952 Humphreys laid the foundation stone of the William Humphreys Art Gallery which was officially opened six months later by Harry Oppenheimer. Humphreys served as curator, secretary, caretaker in the Gallery's early years.

== Freedom of the City of Kimberley ==
Humphreys had conferred upon him Freedom of the City in a ceremony in the Council Chamber on 14 September 1961.

== Death and funeral ==
Following his death on 25 July 1965, a civic funeral took place at the Newton Dutch Reformed Church.
