= Colesberg (House of Assembly of South Africa constituency) =

- Former constituency for the South African House of Assembly
- Province: Cape of Good Hope
- Electorate: 9,302 (1970)

Former constituency
- Created: 1910; 1966
- Abolished: 1938; 1974
- Number of members: 1
- Last MHA: R. F. van Heerden (NP)
- Created from: De Aar-Colesberg (1966)
- Replaced by: Albert-Colesberg (1938); De Aar (1974)

Colesberg was a constituency in the Cape Province of South Africa, which existed from 1910 to 1938 and again from 1966 to 1974. It covered a rural area near the Orange River, centred on the town of Colesberg. Throughout its existence it elected one member to the House of Assembly and one to the Cape Provincial Council.

== Franchise notes ==
When the Union of South Africa was formed in 1910, the electoral qualifications in use in each pre-existing colony were kept in place. The Cape Colony had implemented a "colour-blind" franchise known as the Cape Qualified Franchise, which included all adult literate men owning more than £75 worth of property (controversially raised from £25 in 1892), and this initially remained in effect after the colony became the Cape Province. As of 1908, 22,784 out of 152,221 electors in the Cape Colony were "Native or Coloured". Eligibility to serve in Parliament and the Provincial Council, however, was restricted to whites from 1910 onward.

The first challenge to the Cape Qualified Franchise came with the Women's Enfranchisement Act, 1930 and the Franchise Laws Amendment Act, 1931, which extended the vote to women and removed property qualifications for the white population only – non-white voters remained subject to the earlier restrictions. In 1936, the Representation of Natives Act removed all black voters from the common electoral roll and introduced three "Native Representative Members", white MPs elected by the black voters of the province and meant to represent their interests in particular. A similar provision was made for Coloured voters with the Separate Representation of Voters Act, 1951, and although this law was challenged by the courts, it went into effect in time for the 1958 general election, which was thus held with all-white voter rolls for the first time in South African history. The all-white franchise would continue until the end of apartheid and the introduction of universal suffrage in 1994.

== History ==
Like many constituencies in the rural Cape, the electorate of Colesberg was largely Afrikaans-speaking, but in its first incarnation the seat was more marginal than many of its neighbours. This seems to have been in large part due to its first MP, George Albertijn Louw of the South African Party, who successfully defended the seat against the National Party in several close contests, finally losing out to Dutch Reformed minister Hendrik Adriaan Lamprecht in 1929. Lamprecht died in 1932, but his party colleague Charl Wynand Markelbach du Toit would hold the seat until its abolition in 1938, and was elected to represent the Transvaal seat of Marico in a by-election soon thereafter.

Colesberg was recreated in 1966, out of part of the De Aar-Colesberg seat, and in this incarnation was a safe seat for the ruling National Party. Its first MP, Michiel Jacobus de la Rey Venter, had previously represented the seat of De Aar-Colesberg since 1950, and the by-election to replace him in 1973 was won unopposed by his party colleague R. F. van Heerden, who would go on to represent the De Aar seat after Colesberg's abolition the following year.

== Members ==
Election	Member	Party
1910	George Albertijn Louw	SAP
1915	George Albertijn Louw	SAP
1920	George Albertijn Louw	SAP
1921	George Albertijn Louw	SAP
1924	George Albertijn Louw	SAP
1929	Hendrik Adriaan Lamprecht	National
1932 by	Charl Wynand Markelbach du Toit	National
1933	Charl Wynand Markelbach du Toit	National
1934	Charl Wynand Markelbach du Toit	United
1938	constituency abolished	

Election	Member	Party
1966	Michiel Jacobus de la Rey Venter	National
1970	Michiel Jacobus de la Rey Venter	National
1973 by	R. F. van Heerden	National
1974	constituency abolished	

== Detailed results ==
=== Elections in the 1910s ===
General election 1910: Colesberg
Party	Candidate	Votes	%	±%
South African	G. A. Louw	Unopposed		
South African win (new seat)				

General election 1915: Colesberg
Party	Candidate	Votes	%	±%
South African	G. A. Louw	1,424	55.3	N/A
National	J. A. Venter	1,151	44.7	New
Majority		273	10.6	N/A
Turnout		2,575	85.2	N/A
South African hold		Swing	N/A	

=== Elections in the 1920s ===
General election 1920: Colesberg
Party	Candidate	Votes	%	±%
South African	G. A. Louw	1,350	46.0	−9.3
National	D. J. Jooste	1,344	45.8	+1.1
Labour	M. M. Sutherland	241	8.2	New
Majority		6	0.2	−10.4
Turnout		2,935	76.7	−5.5
South African hold		Swing	-5.2	

General election 1921: Colesberg
Party	Candidate	Votes	%	±%
South African	G. A. Louw	1,788	55.1	+9.1
National	D. J. Jooste	1,458	44.9	−0.9
Majority		330	10.2	+10.0
Turnout		3,246	77.3	+0.6
South African hold		Swing	+5.0	

General election 1924: Colesberg
Party	Candidate	Votes	%	±%
South African	G. A. Louw	1,582	51.3	−3.8
National	F. J. du Toit	1,478	48.0	+3.1
Rejected ballots		22	0.7	N/A
Majority		104	3.3	−6.9
Turnout		3,082	85.9	+8.6
South African hold		Swing	-3.5	

General election 1929: Colesberg
Party	Candidate	Votes	%	±%
National	H. A. Lamprecht	1,731	54.6	+6.6
South African	G. A. Louw	1,415	44.7	−6.6
Rejected ballots		22	0.7	+-0
Majority		316	9.9	N/A
Turnout		3,168	87.6	+1.7
National gain from South African		Swing	+6.6	

=== Elections in the 1930s ===
Colesberg by-election, 6 July 1932
Party	Candidate	Votes	%	±%
National	Charl W. M. du Toit	3,090	51.2	−3.4
South African	J. J. de Villiers	2,889	47.9	+3.2
Rejected ballots		57	0.9	+0.2
Majority		201	3.3	−6.6
Turnout		6,036	93.8	+6.2
National hold		Swing	-3.3	

General election 1933: Colesberg
Party	Candidate	Votes	%	±%
National	C. W. M. du Toit	Unopposed		
National hold				
