= Fredrik William Beyers =

South African judge and politician (1867–1938)

The Honourable Fredrik William Beyers
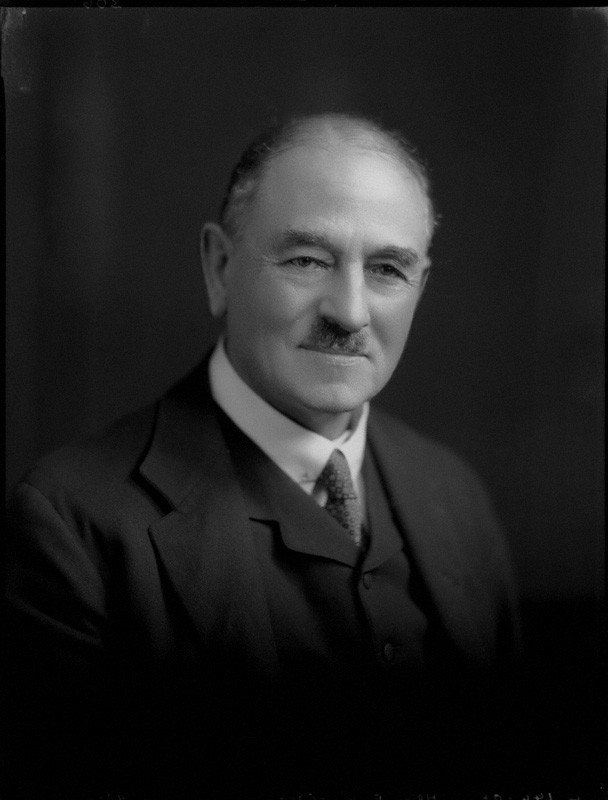

Minister of Mines and Industry
- In office 30 June 1924 – 1 September 1929
- Prime Minister: J. B. M. Hertzog
- Preceded by: François Stephanus Malan
- Succeeded by: A. P. J. Fourie

Member of the Volksraad
- In office 1907 – 31 May 1910
- Succeeded by: Creation of the Union
- Constituency: Turffontein

Member of the House of Assembly
- In office 4 July 1918 – 1 September 1929
- Preceded by: Everard Walter Fichardt
- Succeeded by: C. W. M. du Toit
- Constituency: Edenburg

Personal details
- Born: 15 October 1867 Paarl, Cape Colony
- Died: 15 September 1938 (aged 70) Muizenberg, South Africa
- Party: Het Volk; National Party; Purified National Party
- Education: South African College; University of the Cape of Good Hope (BA, LLB)

Fredrik William Beyers (15 October 1867 – 15 September 1938) was a South African politician, lawyer and judge.

He was Minister of Mines and Industry from 1924 to 1929. He then served as Justice of Appeal of the Appellate Division of the Supreme Court of South Africa from 1923 until 1937.
