= David Harris (South African businessman) =

South African legislator and businessman

Colonel Sir David Harris KCMG

Member of the Parliament for Kimberley
- In office 1897–1929
- Monarchs: Victoria (1897-1901); Edward VII (1901-1910); George V (1910-1929)
- Preceded by: Barney Barnato

Personal details
- Born: 12 July 1852 London, England
- Died: 23 September 1942 (aged 89–90) Kimberley, South Africa
- Relations: Barney Barnato (cousin)

Military service
- Allegiance: United Kingdom
- Rank: Colonel
- Battles/wars: Second Boer War; Xhosa Wars

Colonel Sir David Harris KCMG (12 July 1852 - 23 September 1942) was a soldier, diamond magnate, and legislator.

== Early life ==
He was born in London, England, and emigrated to the Colony of Natal in 1871. He later traveled 950 km from Durban to Kimberley where he began working as a prospector. Within two years, he was wealthy and had made the acquaintance of Cecil Rhodes.

== Career ==
=== Military service ===
He joined the Du Toit's Pan Horse Regiment in 1876 fought in the Gaika-Galeka war (part of the Xhosa Wars in the Eastern Cape. He also fought in other campaigns and distinguished himself in the Langeberg Rebellion (1896-97).

He served in the Home Guard during the Siege of Kimberley.

=== Member of Parliament ===
In 1897, he joined the Parliament of the Cape of Good Hope on the death of Barney Barnato. He held the seat for 32 years. In 1897, he also became a director of De Beers Consolidated Mines, an office he held until 1931.

== Personal life ==
Harris married his wife, Rosa Gabriel, in 1873, in the first Jewish wedding to take place in Kimberley.
