= Jan Serfontein (politician, born 1898) =

South African politician (1898–1967)

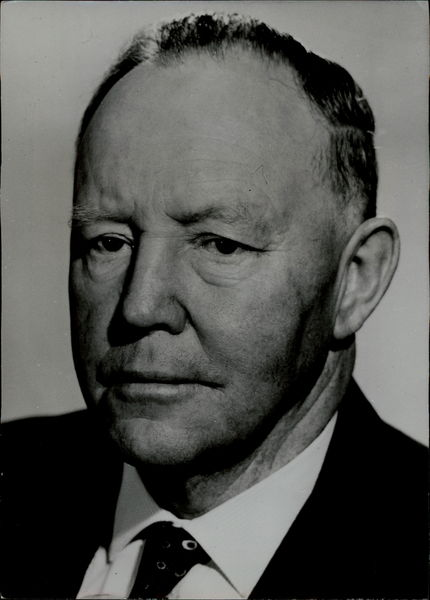

Minister of Social Welfare and Pensions

Minister of Education, Arts and Science

Minister of Posts and Telegraphs

Personal details
- Born: 3 February 1898
- Died: 17 October 1967 (aged 69)

Jan Jonathan Serfontein was a South African politician. He served as Minister of Education, Arts and Science and Minister of Social Welfare and Pensions.
