= Results of the 1933 South African general election =

- 17 May 1933

All 150 seats in the House of Assembly 76 seats needed for a majority
- Registered: 957,636
- Turnout: 33.77% (▼41.57pp)
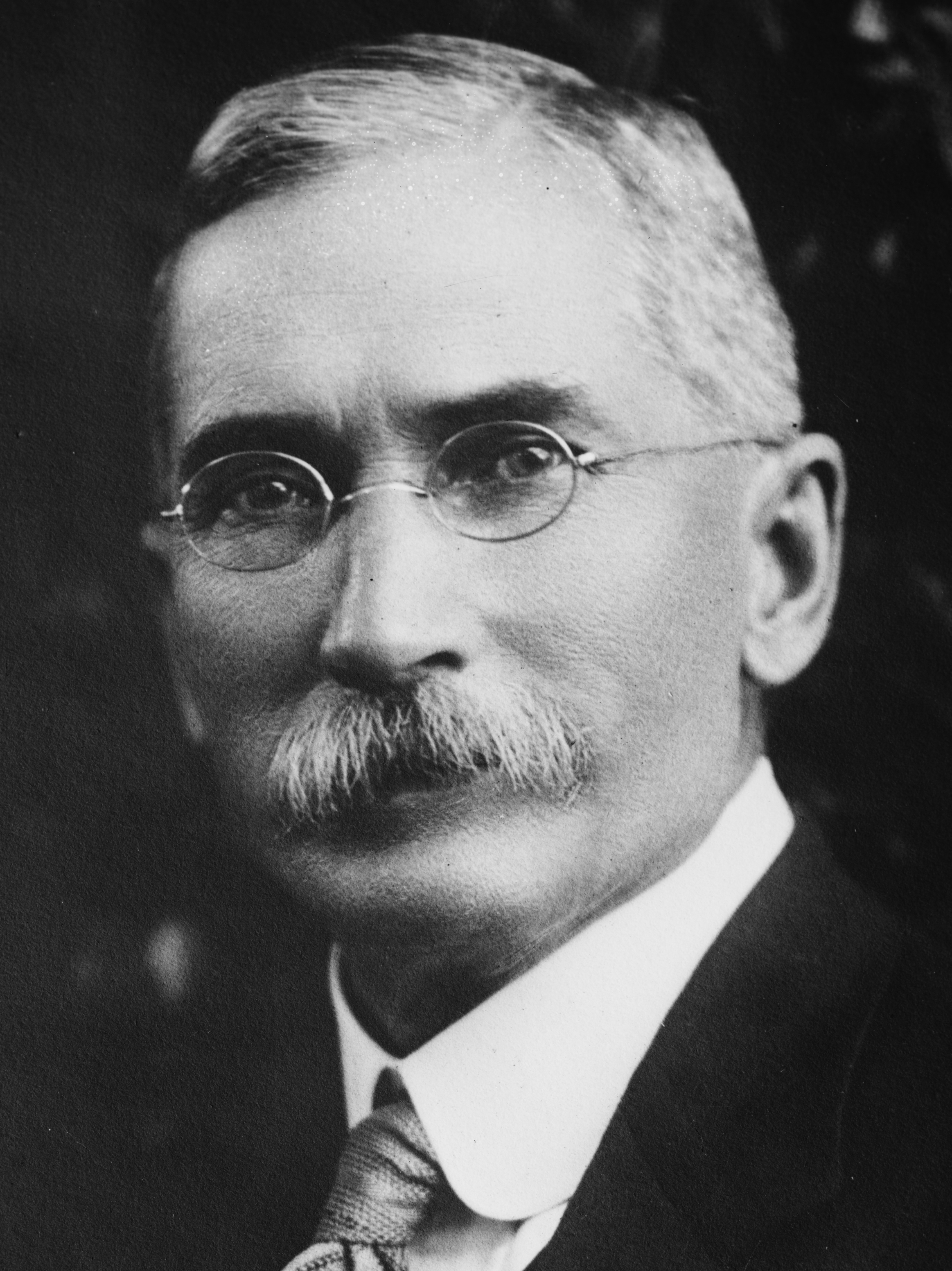

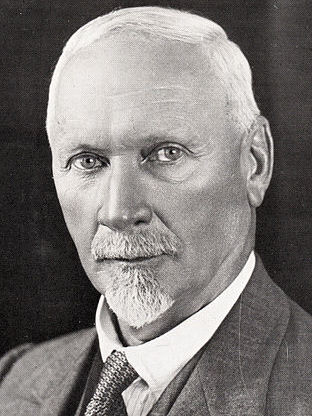

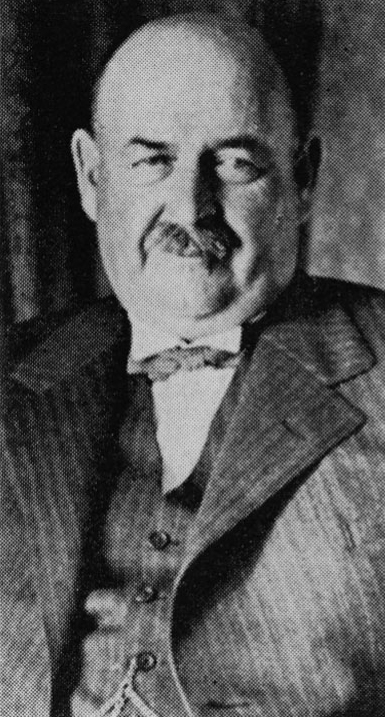

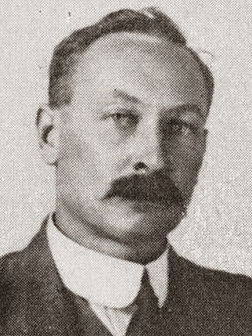
	First party	Second party
Leader	J. B. M. Hertzog	Jan Smuts
Party	National	South African
Leader's seat	Smithfield	Standerton
Last election	41.17%, 78 seats	46.50%, 61 seats
Seats won	75	61
Seat change	▼3	Steady
Popular vote	101,159	71,486
Percentage	31.61%	22.34%
Swing	▼9.55pp	▼24.16pp
	Third party	Fourth party
Leader	Tielman Roos	Walter Madeley
Party	Roos	Labour
Leader's seat	stood in Rustenburg	Benoni
Last election	Did not exist	9.86%, 8 seats
Seats won	2	2
Seat change	New party	▼6
Popular vote	27,441	20,276
Percentage	8.58%	6.34%
Swing	New party	▼3.52pp
- Results by province
Prime Minister before election
J. B. M. Hertzog
National
Elected Prime Minister
J. B. M. Hertzog
National

This is a list of constituency results for the 1933 South African general election.

== Boundary and franchise changes ==
The Sixth Delimitation Commission (1932) expanded the House of Assembly from 148 to 150 seats, the size it would remain for the next twenty years. The apportionment between the provinces was changed significantly, with the Cape and Transvaal both gaining seats at the expense of the Orange Free State and Natal.

Province	Seats 1929	Created	Abolished	Seats 1933
Cape of Good Hope	58	Bellville; Claremont; Maitland; Moorreesburg; Mossel Bay; Rondebosch	Cape Flats; Ladismith; Newlands	61
Natal	17		Durban Berea	16
Orange Free State	18		Edenburg; Lindley	16
Transvaal	55	Boksburg North; Kensington; North Rand; Rosettenville	Denver; North East Rand	57

This was the first election held following the passage of the Women's Enfranchisement Act, 1930 and the Franchise Laws Amendment Act, 1931, which in combination gave the vote to all white citizens above the age of 21. A small number of non-white citizens of the Cape Province and Natal retained the right to vote, subject to pre-existing qualifications.

== Cape Province ==
Party	Votes	%	Seats
National Party	47,511	37.26	27
South African Party	25,610	20.08	29
Labour Party (Creswell)	3,156	2.48	1
Labour Party (National Council)	1,271	1.00	0
Independents	49,966	39.18	4
Total	127,514	100.00	61
Source: Schoeman

Unopposed candidates: SAP 21, National 13.

=== Albany ===
General election 1933: Albany
Party	Candidate	Votes	%	±%
South African	R. H. Struben	Unopposed		
South African hold				

=== Albert ===
General election 1933: Albert
Party	Candidate	Votes	%	±%
National	L. J. Steytler	3,289	64.9	−2.4
Independent	T. P. N. Coetsee	1,711	33.8	New
Rejected ballots		66	1.3	+0.3
Majority		1,578	31.2	N/A
Turnout		5,066	76.3	−9.2
National hold		Swing	N/A	

=== Aliwal ===
General election 1933: Aliwal
Party	Candidate	Votes	%	±%
South African	C. A. A. Sephton	Unopposed		
South African hold				

=== Beaconsfield ===
General election 1933: Beaconsfield
Party	Candidate	Votes	%	±%
South African	W. B. Humphreys	Unopposed		
South African hold				

=== Beaufort West ===
General election 1933: Beaufort West
Party	Candidate	Votes	%	±%
National	P. N. Basson	Unopposed		
National hold				

=== Bechuanaland ===
General election 1933: Bechuanaland
Party	Candidate	Votes	%	±%
National	P. J. du Plessis	2,631	54.2	+0.5
Independent	P. H. de Kock	2,183	44.9	New
Rejected ballots		44	0.9	-1.0
Majority		448	9.2	N/A
Turnout		4,858	79.2	−4.8
National hold		Swing	N/A	

=== Bellville ===
General election 1933: Bellville
Party	Candidate	Votes	%	±%
Labour	Frederic Creswell	2,307	46.9	New
Independent	J. W. Mushert	1,842	37.5	New
Independent	D. J. Cloete	716	14.6	New
Rejected ballots		50	1.0	N/A
Majority		465	9.5	N/A
Turnout		4,915	76.8	N/A
Labour win (new seat)				

=== Bredasdorp ===
General election 1933: Bredasdorp
Party	Candidate	Votes	%	±%
South African	P. V. van der Byl	Unopposed		
South African hold				

=== Caledon ===
General election 1933: Caledon
Party	Candidate	Votes	%	±%
South African	Joel Krige	Unopposed		
South African hold				

=== Calvinia ===
General election 1933: Calvinia
Party	Candidate	Votes	%	±%
National	D. F. Malan	2,634	56.3	−10.6
Independent	A. C. S. Steenkamp	2,013	43.0	New
Rejected ballots		35	0.7	-1.0
Majority		621	13.3	N/A
Turnout		4,682	82.2	+6.6
National hold		Swing	N/A	

=== Cape Town Castle ===
General election 1933: Cape Town Castle
Party	Candidate	Votes	%	±%
South African	Morris Alexander	Unopposed		
South African hold				

=== Cape Town Central ===
General election 1933: Cape Town Central
Party	Candidate	Votes	%	±%
South African	R. W. Bowen	Unopposed		
South African hold				

=== Cape Town Gardens ===
General election 1933: Cape Town Gardens
Party	Candidate	Votes	%	±%
South African	C. W. A. Coulter	Unopposed		
South African hold				

=== Cathcart ===
General election 1933: Cathcart
Party	Candidate	Votes	%	±%
South African	C. M. van Coller	Unopposed		
South African hold				

=== Ceres ===
General election 1933: Ceres
Party	Candidate	Votes	%	±%
National	J. W. J. W. Roux	2,514	57.9	+0.4
Independent	E. H. Nellmapius	1,786	41.1	−0.7
Rejected ballots		41	1.0	+0.3
Majority		728	16.8	+1.1
Turnout		4,341	68.5	−18.8
National hold		Swing	+0.6	

=== Claremont ===
General election 1933: Claremont
Party	Candidate	Votes	%	±%
South African	Richard Stuttaford	Unopposed		
South African win (new seat)				

=== Colesberg ===
General election 1933: Colesberg
Party	Candidate	Votes	%	±%
National	C. W. M. du Toit	Unopposed		
National hold				

=== Cradock ===
General election 1933: Cradock
Party	Candidate	Votes	%	±%
National	J. F. van G. Bekker	Unopposed		
National hold				

=== East London City ===
General election 1933: East London City
Party	Candidate	Votes	%	±%
South African	J. A. Bowie	3,141	52.2	−2.0
Independent	James Stewart	2,828	47.0	+2.1
Rejected ballots		47	0.8	-0.1
Majority		313	5.2	−4.1
Turnout		6,016	71.4	−9.1
South African hold		Swing	-2.1	

=== East London North ===
General election 1933: East London North
Party	Candidate	Votes	%	±%
South African	J. J. Byron	Unopposed		
South African hold				

=== Fort Beaufort ===
General election 1933: Fort Beaufort
Party	Candidate	Votes	%	±%
South African	R. A. Hockley	Unopposed		
South African hold				

=== George ===
General election 1933: George
Party	Candidate	Votes	%	±%
National	Heinrich Gerdener	3,913	79.9	+14.2
Independent	P. S. Heyns	914	18.7	New
Rejected ballots		68	1.4	+0.3
Majority		2,999	61.3	N/A
Turnout		4,895	68.4	−14.0
National hold		Swing	N/A	

=== Gordonia ===
General election 1933: Gordonia
Party	Candidate	Votes	%	±%
National	A. P. J. Fourie	Unopposed		
National hold				

=== Graaff-Reinet ===
General election 1933: Graaff-Reinet
Party	Candidate	Votes	%	±%
National	Karl Bremer	3,777	78.4	+18.5
Independent	L. A. F. Slabbert	976	20.3	New
Rejected ballots		62	1.3	+0.3
Majority		2,801	58.2	N/A
Turnout		4,815	67.2	−13.7
National hold		Swing	N/A	

=== Griqualand ===
General election 1933: Griqualand
Party	Candidate	Votes	%	±%
Independent	C. W. Gray	2,139	54.5	New
South African	L. D. Gilson	1,733	44.1	−33.1
Rejected ballots		54	1.4	-0.1
Majority		406	10.3	N/A
Turnout		3,926	76.7	+3.1
Independent gain from South African		Swing	N/A	

=== Hopetown ===
General election 1933: Hopetown
Party	Candidate	Votes	%	±%
National	Pieter Theron	Unopposed		
National hold				

=== Hottentots Holland ===
General election 1933: Hottentots Holland
Party	Candidate	Votes	%	±%
South African	P. A. B. Faure	Unopposed		
South African hold				

=== Humansdorp ===
General election 1933: Humansdorp
Party	Candidate	Votes	%	±%
National	Paul Sauer	Unopposed		
National hold				

=== Kimberley ===
General election 1933: Kimberley
Party	Candidate	Votes	%	±%
South African	Ernest Oppenheimer	Unopposed		
South African hold				

=== King William's Town ===
General election 1933: King William's Town
Party	Candidate	Votes	%	±%
South African	A. C. V. Baines	Unopposed		
South African hold				

=== Kuruman ===
General election 1933: Kuruman
Party	Candidate	Votes	%	±%
National	I. van W. Raubenheimer	Unopposed		
National hold				

=== Maitland ===
General election 1933: Maitland
Party	Candidate	Votes	%	±%
South African	R. J. du Toit	2,383	57.0	New
Independent	A. J. Chiappini	1,716	41.1	New
Rejected ballots		81	1.9	N/A
Majority		667	16.0	N/A
Turnout		4,180	68.9	N/A
South African win (new seat)				

=== Malmesbury ===
General election 1933: Malmesbury
Party	Candidate	Votes	%	±%
National	P. A. Bergh	Unopposed		
National hold				

=== Moorreesburg ===
General election 1933: Moorreesburg
Party	Candidate	Votes	%	±%
National	Frans Erasmus	2,923	61.4	New
Independent	J. J. de Kock	1,788	37.5	New
Independent	W. H. Lategan	15	0.3	New
Rejected ballots		38	0.8	N/A
Majority		1,135	23.8	N/A
Turnout		4,764	76.1	N/A
National win (new seat)				

=== Mossel Bay ===
General election 1933: Mossel Bay
Party	Candidate	Votes	%	±%
National	J. J. Scholtz	3,129	57.5	New
Independent	H. C. Muller	2,214	40.7	New
Rejected ballots		101	1.8	N/A
Majority		915	16.8	N/A
Turnout		5,444	80.7	N/A
National win (new seat)				

=== Mowbray ===
General election 1933: Mowbray
Party	Candidate	Votes	%	±%
South African	Frank Joubert	Unopposed		
South African hold				

=== Namaqualand ===
General election 1933: Namaqualand
Party	Candidate	Votes	%	±%
Independent	W. P. Steenkamp	2,477	52.9	−4.7
National	A. J. R. van Rhijn	2,151	45.9	+22.9
Rejected ballots		56	1.2	+0.1
Majority		326	7.0	−27.6
Turnout		4,684	83.6	+22.6
Independent hold		Swing	-14.8	

=== Oudtshoorn ===
General election 1933: Oudtshoorn
Party	Candidate	Votes	%	±%
National	S. P. le Roux	3,608	57.6	−2.7
Independent	J. E. Potgieter	2,561	40.9	New
Rejected ballots		96	1.5	+0.2
Majority		1,047	16.7	N/A
Turnout		6,265	85.6	−0.3
National hold		Swing	N/A	

=== Paarl ===
General election 1933: Paarl
Party	Candidate	Votes	%	±%
National	P. P. du Toit	3,797	68.4	+18.1
Independent	T. Köhler	1,643	29.6	New
Rejected ballots		115	2.0	+0.9
Majority		2,154	38.8	N/A
Turnout		5,555	73.8	−17.6
National hold		Swing	N/A	

=== Piketberg ===
General election 1933: Piketberg
Party	Candidate	Votes	%	±%
National	J. H. H. de Waal	Unopposed		
National hold				

=== Port Elizabeth Central ===
General election 1933: Port Elizabeth Central
Party	Candidate	Votes	%	±%
South African	A. P. J. Wares	2,953	60.8	−3.6
Independent	L. W. Smith	1,869	38.5	New
Rejected ballots		32	0.7	-0.5
Majority		1,084	38.8	N/A
Turnout		4,854	57.2	−15.3
South African hold		Swing	N/A	

=== Port Elizabeth North ===
General election 1933: Port Elizabeth North
Party	Candidate	Votes	%	±%
South African	C. F. Kayser	Unopposed		
South African hold				

=== Port Elizabeth South ===
General election 1933: Port Elizabeth South
Party	Candidate	Votes	%	±%
Independent	John Hirsch	2,803	52.2	New
South African	E. R. McIlwraith	2,483	46.2	−30.6
Rejected ballots		85	1.6	-0.8
Majority		320	6.0	N/A
Turnout		5,371	74.0	+2.0
Independent gain from South African		Swing	N/A	

=== Prieska ===
General election 1933: Prieska
Party	Candidate	Votes	%	±%
National	C. H. Geldenhuys	Unopposed		
National hold				

=== Queenstown ===
General election 1933: Queenstown
Party	Candidate	Votes	%	±%
South African	G. C. van Heerden	Unopposed		
South African hold				

=== Riversdale ===
General election 1933: Riversdale
Party	Candidate	Votes	%	±%
National	A. L. Badenhorst	3,040	61.8	+7.7
Independent	E. Morrison	1,817	37.0	New
Rejected ballots		60	1.2	-0.2
Majority		1,223	24.9	N/A
Turnout		4,917	74.8	−17.1
National hold		Swing	N/A	

=== Rondebosch ===
General election 1933: Rondebosch
Party	Candidate	Votes	%	±%
South African	James Chalmers	Unopposed		
South African win (new seat)				

=== Salt River ===
General election 1933: Salt River
Party	Candidate	Votes	%	±%
South African	Harry Lawrence	2,705	67.1	+16.9
Independent Labour	F. Lopes	1,271	31.5	New
Rejected ballots		55	1.4	+0.7
Majority		1,434	35.6	N/A
Turnout		4,031	57.6	−17.0
South African hold		Swing	N/A	

=== Sea Point ===
General election 1933: Sea Point
Party	Candidate	Votes	%	±%
South African	Gideon Brand van Zyl	2,885	49.9	N/A
Independent	W. F. Fish	2,852	49.3	New
Rejected ballots		45	0.8	N/A
Majority		33	0.6	N/A
Turnout		5,782	69.4	N/A
South African hold		Swing	N/A	

=== Somerset ===
General election 1933: Somerset
Party	Candidate	Votes	%	±%
National	L. J. Vosloo	Unopposed		
National hold				

=== South Peninsula ===
General election 1933: South Peninsula
Party	Candidate	Votes	%	±%
South African	Sidney Frank Waterson	Unopposed		
South African hold				

=== Stellenbosch ===
General election 1933: Stellenbosch
Party	Candidate	Votes	%	±%
National	W. B. de Villiers	Unopposed		
National hold				

=== Swellendam ===
General election 1933: Swellendam
Party	Candidate	Votes	%	±%
National	Henry Allan Fagan	3,820	61.2	+5.5
Independent	G. J. Kloppers	2,353	37.7	New
Rejected ballots		70	1.1	+0.2
Majority		1,467	23.5	N/A
Turnout		6,243	83.0	−8.6
National hold		Swing	N/A	

=== Tembuland ===
General election 1933: Tembuland
Party	Candidate	Votes	%	±%
South African	A. O. B. Payn	Unopposed		
South African hold				

=== Uitenhage ===
General election 1933: Uitenhage
Party	Candidate	Votes	%	±%
South African	F. T. Bates	3,637	67.4	+11.0
Independent	A. J. Sellick	1,675	31.0	New
Rejected ballots		88	1.6	-0.1
Majority		1,962	36.3	N/A
Turnout		5,400	72.8	−14.5
South African hold		Swing	N/A	

=== Victoria West ===
General election 1933: Victoria West
Party	Candidate	Votes	%	±%
National	P. J. H. Luttig	Unopposed		
National hold				

=== Willowmore ===
General election 1933: Willowmore
Party	Candidate	Votes	%	±%
National	G. P. Steyn	2,758	53.0	−10.8
Independent	G. N. Hayward	918	46.2	New
Rejected ballots		43	0.8	N/A
Majority		353	6.8	N/A
Turnout		5,206	81.4	−5.3
National hold		Swing	N/A	

=== Wodehouse ===
General election 1933: Wodehouse
Party	Candidate	Votes	%	±%
National	Stephanus Bekker	3,527	70.0	+14.9
Independent	J. H. Munnik	1,454	28.8	New
Rejected ballots		60	1.2	-0.5
Majority		2,073	41.1	N/A
Turnout		5,041	71.8	−17.3
National hold		Swing	N/A	

=== Woodstock ===
General election 1933: Woodstock
Party	Candidate	Votes	%	±%
South African	A. J. MacCallum	2,112	70.1	+10.8
Labour (N.C.)	D. McWilliams	849	28.2	+27.1
Rejected ballots		50	1.7	+0.7
Majority		1,263	41.9	N/A
Turnout		3,011	56.7	−15.9
South African hold		Swing	-8.2	

=== Worcester ===
General election 1933: Worcester
Party	Candidate	Votes	%	±%
South African	J. E. J. Krige	Unopposed		
South African hold				

=== Wynberg ===
General election 1933: Wynberg
Party	Candidate	Votes	%	±%
Independent	J. B. Robinson	1,992	39.5	New
South African	J. W. Allen	1,578	31.3	−38.1
Independent	W. J. Laite	1,424	28.2	New
Rejected ballots		50	1.0	-0.2
Majority		414	8.2	N/A
Turnout		5,044	73.9	+3.2
Independent gain from South African		Swing	N/A	

== Natal ==
Party	Votes	%	Seats
South African Party	23,580	53.91	12
Natal Home Rule Party	12,828	29.33	2
National Party	3,082	7.05	1
Labour Party (National Council)	2,960	6.77	1
Federalists	1,290	2.95	0
Total	43,740	100.00	16
Source: Schoeman

Unopposed candidates: SAP 4.

=== Dundee ===
General election 1933: Dundee
Party	Candidate	Votes	%	±%
South African	Leif Egeland	2,840	54.1	−5.3
Independent	E. A. Benson	1,840	35.0	New
Natal Home Rule Party	W. R. F. Hunt	540	10.3	New
Rejected ballots		31	0.6	-0.2
Majority		335	19.0	N/A
Turnout		5,251	75.7	−2.9
South African hold		Swing	N/A	

=== Durban District ===
General election 1933: Durban District
Party	Candidate	Votes	%	±%
South African	A. H. J. Eaton	1,787	42.5	−27.7
Federalist	T. H. Blew	1,290	30.7	New
Natal Home Rule Party	R. J. Unsworth	1,096	26.1	New
Rejected ballots		31	0.7	+0.1
Majority		497	11.8	N/A
Turnout		4,204	71.1	−3.2
South African hold		Swing	N/A	

=== Durban Greyville ===
General election 1933: Durban Greyville
Party	Candidate	Votes	%	±%
Natal Home Rule Party	J. G. Derbyshire	1,810	45.9	New
South African	F. Johnston	1,439	36.5	−17.5
Independent	S. M. Petterson	679	17.2	New
Rejected ballots		13	0.4	-0.7
Majority		371	9.4	N/A
Turnout		3,941	65.4	−19.0
Natal Home Rule Party gain from South African		Swing	N/A	

=== Durban Point ===
General election 1933: Durban Point
Party	Candidate	Votes	%	±%
South African	T. M. Wadley	2,204	63.6	−4.2
Independent	J. E. Hay	1,217	35.1	New
Rejected ballots		43	1.3	+0.4
Majority		987	28.5	N/A
Turnout		3,464	53.6	−19.8
South African hold		Swing	N/A	

=== Durban Stamford Hill ===
General election 1933: Durban Stamford Hill
Party	Candidate	Votes	%	±%
South African	C. P. Robinson	2,763	65.4	N/A
Natal Home Rule Party	R. M. McKenzie	1,442	34.1	New
Rejected ballots		23	0.5	N/A
Majority		1,321	31.2	N/A
Turnout		4,228	63.0	N/A
South African hold		Swing	N/A	

=== Durban Umbilo ===
General election 1933: Durban Umbilo
Party	Candidate	Votes	%	±%
Labour (N.C.)	R. T. McArthur	2,960	68.2	+30.2
South African	J. R. Walker	1,349	31.1	−30.3
Rejected ballots		33	0.7	+0.1
Majority		1,611	37.1	N/A
Turnout		4,342	70.4	−5.1
Labour gain from South African		Swing	+30.3	

=== Durban Umlazi ===
General election 1933: Durban Umlazi
Party	Candidate	Votes	%	±%
Natal Home Rule Party	S. S. Sutton	2,321	52.3	New
South African	J. Shave	2,093	47.1	−15.9
Rejected ballots		26	0.6	+-0
Majority		228	5.1	N/A
Turnout		4,440	73.7	−8.0
Natal Home Rule Party gain from South African		Swing	N/A	

=== Illovo ===
General election 1933: Illovo
Party	Candidate	Votes	%	±%
South African	J. S. Marwick	Unopposed		
South African hold				

=== Klip River ===
General election 1933: Klip River
Party	Candidate	Votes	%	±%
South African	William Cochrane	2,314	67.1	+11.7
Independent	P. J. Meyer	1,071	31.1	New
Rejected ballots		64	1.8	+1.1
Majority		1,243	36.0	N/A
Turnout		3,449	63.3	−16.7
South African hold		Swing	N/A	

=== Natal Coast ===
General election 1933: Natal Coast
Party	Candidate	Votes	%	±%
South African	L. F. Reynolds	2,232	55.7	N/A
Natal Home Rule Party	N. P. Palmer	1,750	43.7	New
Rejected ballots		23	0.6	N/A
Majority		482	12.0	N/A
Turnout		4,005	72.9	N/A
South African hold		Swing	N/A	

=== Newcastle ===
General election 1933: Newcastle
Party	Candidate	Votes	%	±%
South African	O. R. Nel	Unopposed		
South African hold				

=== Pietermaritzburg District ===
General election 1933: Pietermaritzburg District
Party	Candidate	Votes	%	±%
South African	W. J. O'Brien	2,389	53.1	N/A
Natal Home Rule Party	N. P. Palmer	2,087	46.4	New
Rejected ballots		24	0.5	N/A
Majority		302	6.7	N/A
Turnout		4,500	71.8	N/A
South African hold		Swing	N/A	

=== Pietermaritzburg North ===
General election 1933: Pietermaritzburg North
Party	Candidate	Votes	%	±%
South African	W. A. Deane	2,170	54.7	−35.3
Natal Home Rule Party	T. G. Strachan	1,782	44.9	New
Rejected ballots		19	0.4	-0.3
Majority		388	9.8	N/A
Turnout		3,971	65.8	+9.9
South African hold		Swing	N/A	

=== Vryheid ===
General election 1933: Vryheid
Party	Candidate	Votes	%	±%
National	Ernest George Jansen	3,082	71.3	+13.3
Independent	P. J. Wessels	1,205	27.9	New
Rejected ballots		36	0.8	+0.2
Majority		1,877	43.4	N/A
Turnout		4,323	76.2	−7.9
National hold		Swing	N/A	

=== Weenen ===
General election 1933: Weenen
Party	Candidate	Votes	%	±%
South African	Harold Abrahamson	Unopposed		
South African hold				

=== Zululand ===
General election 1933: Zululand
Party	Candidate	Votes	%	±%
South African	George Heaton Nicholls	Unopposed		
South African hold				

== Orange Free State ==
Party	Votes	%	Seats
National Party	8,333	47.69	15
Roos Party	4,667	26.71	0
Labour Party (Creswell)	2,854	16.33	1
Independents	1,620	9.27	0
Total	17,474	100.00	16
Source: Schoeman

Unopposed candidates: National 12.

=== Bethlehem ===
General election 1933: Bethlehem
Party	Candidate	Votes	%	±%
National	R. A. T. van der Merwe	Unopposed		
National hold				

=== Bloemfontein North ===
General election 1933: Bloemfontein North
Party	Candidate	Votes	%	±%
Labour (Creswell)	Fred Shaw	2,834	51.4	-0.7
Roos	Arthur Barlow	2,594	46.7	+33.9
Rejected ballots		102	2.9	+1.6
Majority		260	4.7	N/A
Turnout		5,550	67.7	−15.5
Labour hold		Swing	-17.3	

=== Bloemfontein South ===
General election 1933: Bloemfontein South
Party	Candidate	Votes	%	±%
National	J. J. Haywood	3,491	62.1	−5.0
Roos	Colin Fraser Steyn	2,073	36.9	New
Rejected ballots		62	1.0	+0.4
Majority		1,418	38.7	N/A
Turnout		5,626	66.8	−14.8
National hold		Swing	N/A	

=== Boshof ===
General election 1933: Boshof
Party	Candidate	Votes	%	±%
National	J. J. van Rensburg	Unopposed		
National hold				

=== Fauresmith ===
General election 1933: Fauresmith
Party	Candidate	Votes	%	±%
National	Nicolaas Havenga	Unopposed		
National hold				

=== Frankfort ===
General election 1933: Frankfort
Party	Candidate	Votes	%	±%
National	J. B. Wessels	Unopposed		
National hold				

=== Harrismith ===
General election 1933: Harrismith
Party	Candidate	Votes	%	±%
National	A. A. Cilliers	2,150	66.5	−0.2
Independent	D. I. de Villiers	1,063	32.9	New
Rejected ballots		22	0.6	-0.8
Majority		1,087	33.6	N/A
Turnout		3,235	53.9	−23.8
National hold		Swing	N/A	

=== Heilbron ===
General election 1933: Heilbron
Party	Candidate	Votes	%	±%
National	M. L. Malan	Unopposed		
National hold				

=== Hoopstad ===
General election 1933: Hoopstad
Party	Candidate	Votes	%	±%
National	J. H. Viljoen	Unopposed		
National hold				

=== Kroonstad ===
General election 1933: Kroonstad
Party	Candidate	Votes	%	±%
National	P. J. Terreblanche	2,692	82.0	+12.8
Independent	P. C. B. Krone	557	17.0	New
Rejected ballots		22	1.0	-1.1
Majority		2,135	65.1	N/A
Turnout		3,282	47.1	−30.5
National hold		Swing	N/A	

=== Ladybrand ===
General election 1933: Ladybrand
Party	Candidate	Votes	%	±%
National	C. R. Swart	Unopposed		
National hold				

=== Senekal ===
General election 1933: Senekal
Party	Candidate	Votes	%	±%
National	W. J. M. Visser	Unopposed		
National hold				

=== Smithfield-Rouxville ===
General election 1933: Smithfield-Rouxville
Party	Candidate	Votes	%	±%
National	J. B. M. Hertzog	Unopposed		
National hold				

=== Vredefort ===
General election 1933: Vredefort
Party	Candidate	Votes	%	±%
National	E. A. Conroy	Unopposed		
National hold				

=== Wepener ===
General election 1933: Wepener
Party	Candidate	Votes	%	±%
National	J. C. de Wet	Unopposed		
National hold				

=== Winburg ===
General election 1933: Winburg
Party	Candidate	Votes	%	±%
National	N. J. van der Merwe	Unopposed		
National hold				

== Transvaal ==
Party	Votes	%	Seats
National Party	42,233	33.71	32
Roos Party	23,504	18.76	2
South African Party	22,992	18.35	20
Labour Party (National Council)	9,699	7.74	1
Labour Party (Creswell)	2,616	2.09	0
ICU	594	0.47	0
Independents	23,633	18.87	2
Total	125,271	100.00	57
Source: Schoeman

Unopposed candidates: National 14, SAP 12.

=== Barberton ===
General election 1933: Barberton
Party	Candidate	Votes	%	±%
South African	Deneys Reitz	Unopposed		
South African hold				

=== Benoni ===
General election 1933: Benoni
Party	Candidate	Votes	%	±%
Labour (N.C.)	Walter Madeley	3,493	63.9	+26.9
South African	H. Mentz	1,929	35.3	+7.6
Rejected ballots		42	0.8	+0.5
Majority		1,564	28.6	+26.6
Turnout		5,464	82.9	−9.7
Labour hold		Swing	+13.3	

=== Bethal ===
General election 1933: Bethal
Party	Candidate	Votes	%	±%
South African	J. P. Jooste	Unopposed		
South African gain from National				

=== Bezuidenhout ===
General election 1933: Bezuidenhout
Party	Candidate	Votes	%	±%
South African	H. A. Tothill	2,249	56.9	−6.1
Roos	G. Krogh	1,075	27.2	New
Labour (N.C.)	A. Hattingh	585	14.8	New
Rejected ballots		44	1.1	+1.0
Majority		1,174	29.7	N/A
Turnout		3,953	60.7	−18.8
South African hold		Swing	N/A	

=== Boksburg ===
General election 1933: Boksburg
Party	Candidate	Votes	%	±%
Roos	G. S. Bouwer	1,421	31.9	New
Labour (Creswell)	J. J. McMenamin	1,286	28.9	−23.6
Labour (N.C.)	T. Stark	1,141	25.6	+24.0
Independent	J. E. Bigwood	589	13.2	New
Rejected ballots		19	0.4	+-0
Majority		135	3.0	N/A
Turnout		4,456	74.0	−6.7
Roos gain from Labour		Swing	N/A	

=== Boksburg North ===
General election 1933: Boksburg North
Party	Candidate	Votes	%	±%
Independent	Colin Bain-Marais	2,006	40.8	New
National	F. D. Malan	1,345	27.4	New
Independent	P. A. Venter	1,041	21.2	New
Independent	A. J. Esterhuizen	491	10.0	New
Rejected ballots		31	0.6	N/A
Majority		661	13.5	N/A
Turnout		4,914	78.0	N/A
Independent win (new seat)				

=== Brakpan ===
General election 1933: Brakpan
Party	Candidate	Votes	%	±%
National	P. J. G. Zeeman	1,117	24.5	−38.0
Labour (N.C.)	J. F. J. van Rensburg	1,009	22.1	+20.6
Independent	W. Hills	920	20.2	New
Industrial and Commercial Workers' Union	F. W. Pate	594	13.0	New
Independent	W. B. Gale	567	12.4	New
Independent	R. V. Acton	335	7.4	New
Rejected ballots		19	0.4	+-0
Majority		108	2.4	N/A
Turnout		4,561	73.3	−8.3
National hold		Swing	N/A	

=== Brits ===
General election 1933: Brits
Party	Candidate	Votes	%	±%
National	J. H. Grobler	2,545	63.4	+4.0
Roos	J. E. Donkin	1,447	36.1	New
Rejected ballots		21	0.5	-1.6
Majority		1,098	27.3	N/A
Turnout		4,013	74.4	−3.8
National hold		Swing	N/A	

=== Carolina ===
General election 1933: Carolina
Party	Candidate	Votes	%	±%
National	W. H. Rood	2,245	52.0	+0.2
Independent	H. F. Prinsloo	2,037	47.2	New
Rejected ballots		32	0.8	-0.3
Majority		208	4.8	N/A
Turnout		4,314	77.5	−8.4
National hold		Swing	N/A	

=== Christiana ===
General election 1933: Christiana
Party	Candidate	Votes	%	±%
National	J. J. Wentzel	3,061	73.0	+9.8
Roos	H. H. Moll	1,068	25.5	New
Rejected ballots		67	1.5	+0.6
Majority		1,993	47.5	N/A
Turnout		4,196	75.2	−2.4
National hold		Swing	N/A	

=== Delarey ===
General election 1933: Delarey
Party	Candidate	Votes	%	±%
National	L. M. Wentzel	Unopposed		
National hold				

=== Ermelo ===
General election 1933: Ermelo
Party	Candidate	Votes	%	±%
South African	William Richard Collins	Unopposed		
South African hold				

=== Fordsburg ===
General election 1933: Fordsburg
Party	Candidate	Votes	%	±%
National	J. S. F. Pretorius	1,379	35.6	−24.3
Roos	G. C. V. Odendaal	1,266	32.7	New
Independent	C. A. Lagesen	1,185	30.6	New
Rejected ballots		41	1.1	-0.7
Majority		113	2.9	N/A
Turnout		3,871	61.9	−12.0
National hold		Swing	N/A	

=== Germiston ===
General election 1933: Germiston
Party	Candidate	Votes	%	±%
South African	J. G. N. Strauss	Unopposed		
South African gain from Labour				

=== Gezina ===
General election 1933: Gezina
Party	Candidate	Votes	%	±%
National	Oswald Pirow	Unopposed		
National hold				

=== Heidelberg ===
General election 1933: Heidelberg
Party	Candidate	Votes	%	±%
National	S. D. de Wet	Unopposed		
National hold				

=== Hospital ===
General election 1933: Hospital
Party	Candidate	Votes	%	±%
South African	Robert Hugh Henderson	2,458	63.0	+2.6
Roos	G. A. Friendly	1,384	35.5	New
Rejected ballots		62	1.5	+0.9
Majority		1,074	27.5	N/A
Turnout		3,904	52.7	−22.3
South African hold		Swing	N/A	

=== Jeppes ===
General election 1933: Jeppes
Party	Candidate	Votes	%	±%
Roos	Hjalmar Reitz	2,552	65.3	New
Labour (Creswell)	Harry Sampson	1,330	34.0	−17.1
Rejected ballots		27	0.7	+0.2
Majority		1,222	31.3	N/A
Turnout		3,909	56.2	−20.4
Roos gain from Labour		Swing	N/A	

=== Johannesburg North ===
General election 1933: Johannesburg North
Party	Candidate	Votes	%	±%
South African	Jan Hendrik Hofmeyr	Unopposed		
South African hold				

=== Kensington ===
General election 1933: Kensington
Party	Candidate	Votes	%	±%
South African	Leslie Blackwell	3,048	71.1	New
Roos	J. L. Shurink	1,215	28.3	New
Rejected ballots		26	0.6	N/A
Majority		1,833	42.7	N/A
Turnout		4,289	61.3	N/A
South African win (new seat)				

=== Klerksdorp ===
General election 1933: Klerksdorp
Party	Candidate	Votes	%	±%
National	P. C. de Villiers	Unopposed		
National hold				

=== Krugersdorp ===
General election 1933: Krugersdorp
Party	Candidate	Votes	%	±%
National	B. R. Hattingh	2,585	54.9	+0.5
Independent	W. G. Delport	2,030	43.1	New
Rejected ballots		94	2.0	+1.8
Majority		555	11.8	N/A
Turnout		4,709	70.6	−13.8
National hold		Swing	N/A	

=== Langlaagte ===
General election 1933: Langlaagte
Party	Candidate	Votes	%	±%
South African	Willam Bawden	2,175	51.7	+3.6
Labour (Creswell)	John Christie	1,985	47.2	−4.1
Rejected ballots		45	1.1	+0.5
Majority		190	4.5	N/A
Turnout		4,205	67.8	−10.7
South African gain from Labour		Swing	+3.9	

=== Lichtenburg ===
General election 1933: Lichtenburg
Party	Candidate	Votes	%	±%
National	A. J. Swanepoel	2,431	62.7	−3.5
Roos	C. J. Grové	1,341	35.9	New
Rejected ballots		53	1.4	+0.7
Majority		1,000	26.8	N/A
Turnout		3,735	62.5	+0.4
National hold		Swing	N/A	

=== Losberg ===
General election 1933: Losberg
Party	Candidate	Votes	%	±%
National	G. P. Brits	Unopposed		
National hold				

=== Lydenburg ===
General election 1933: Lydenburg
Party	Candidate	Votes	%	±%
National	Elias de Souza	Unopposed		
National hold				

=== Magaliesberg ===
General election 1933: Magaliesberg
Party	Candidate	Votes	%	±%
National	S. F. Alberts	Unopposed		
National hold				

=== Marico ===
General election 1933: Marico
Party	Candidate	Votes	%	±%
National	J. J. Pienaar	Unopposed		
National hold				

=== Middelburg ===
General election 1933: Middelburg
Party	Candidate	Votes	%	±%
National	J. D. Heyns	Unopposed		
National hold				

=== North Rand ===
General election 1933: North Rand
Party	Candidate	Votes	%	±%
National	G. C. S. Heyns	2,468	62.8	New
Roos	C. H. S. Potgieter	1,417	36.0	New
Rejected ballots		47	1.2	N/A
Majority		1,051	26.7	N/A
Turnout		3,932	66.9	N/A
National win (new seat)				

=== Parktown ===
General election 1933: Parktown
Party	Candidate	Votes	%	±%
South African	Leila Reitz	Unopposed		
South African hold				

=== Pietersburg ===
General election 1933: Pietersburg
Party	Candidate	Votes	%	±%
National	Tom Naudé	2,500	68.2	+9.2
Independent	S. T. Davis	1,133	30.9	New
Rejected ballots		35	0.9	+0.4
Majority		1,367	37.3	N/A
Turnout		3,668	71.5	−13.8
National hold		Swing	N/A	

=== Potchefstroom ===
General election 1933: Potchefstroom
Party	Candidate	Votes	%	±%
National	M. L. Fick	2,741	53.5	+0.7
Independent	G. Fleischack	2,333	45.6	New
Rejected ballots		47	0.9	+0.5
Majority		408	8.0	N/A
Turnout		5,121	75.5	−11.6
National hold		Swing	N/A	

=== Potgietersrus ===
General election 1933: Potgietersrus
Party	Candidate	Votes	%	±%
National	S. W. Naudé	2,076	59.6	+7.1
Independent	J. G. Peens	1,343	38.6	New
Rejected ballots		65	1.8	-0.7
Majority		733	21.0	N/A
Turnout		3,484	66.7	−8.9
National hold		Swing	N/A	

=== Pretoria Central ===
General election 1933: Pretoria Central
Party	Candidate	Votes	%	±%
South African	P. V. Pocock	Unopposed		
South African hold				

=== Pretoria District ===
General election 1933: Pretoria District
Party	Candidate	Votes	%	±%
National	Harm Oost	Unopposed		
National hold				

=== Pretoria East ===
General election 1933: Pretoria East
Party	Candidate	Votes	%	±%
South African	C. W. Giovanetti	3,695	76.6	+9.7
Roos	A. Davis	1,090	22.6	New
Rejected ballots		37	0.8	+0.5
Majority		2,605	54.0	N/A
Turnout		4,822	68.0	−12.2
South African hold		Swing	N/A	

=== Pretoria West ===
General election 1933: Pretoria West
Party	Candidate	Votes	%	±%
National	M. S. W. du Toit	1,638	38.8	−16.3
Independent	F. Hopf	1,394	33.0	New
Roos	A. J. Bruwer	1,167	27.7	New
Rejected ballots		20	0.5	-0.7
Majority		244	5.8	N/A
Turnout		4,219	64.4	−16.9
National hold		Swing	N/A	

=== Roodepoort ===
General election 1933: Roodepoort
Party	Candidate	Votes	%	±%
South African	Charles Stallard	Unopposed		
South African hold				

=== Rosettenville ===
General election 1933: Rosettenville
Party	Candidate	Votes	%	±%
South African	E. P. Baumann	2,331	60.5	New
Labour (N.C.)	G. McCormick	1,486	38.6	New
Rejected ballots		36	0.9	N/A
Majority		418	21.9	N/A
Turnout		3,853	60.8	N/A
South African win (new seat)				

=== Rustenburg ===
General election 1933: Rustenburg
Party	Candidate	Votes	%	±%
National	P. G. W. Grobler	2,466	55.5	−3.6
Roos	Tielman Roos	1,922	43.3	New
Rejected ballots		56	1.2	+0.5
Majority		544	12.2	N/A
Turnout		4,444	79.3	−5.1
National hold		Swing	N/A	

=== Soutpansberg ===
General election 1933: Soutpansberg
Party	Candidate	Votes	%	±%
National	E. A. Rooth	2,672	85.5	+31.8
Independent	W. H. Vorster	419	13.4	New
Rejected ballots		34	0.7	-0.3
Majority		2,253	72.1	N/A
Turnout		3,125	63.6	−14.2
National hold		Swing	N/A	

=== Springs ===
General election 1933: Springs
Party	Candidate	Votes	%	±%
South African	R. N. Kotzé	2,619	62.6	+9.4
Roos	C. F. W. Lippiatt	1,531	36.6	New
Rejected ballots		37	0.8	+0.4
Majority		1,088	26.0	N/A
Turnout		4,187	69.8	−12.4
South African hold		Swing	N/A	

=== Standerton ===
General election 1933: Standerton
Party	Candidate	Votes	%	±%
South African	Jan Smuts	Unopposed		
South African hold				

=== Swartruggens ===
General election 1933: Swartruggens
Party	Candidate	Votes	%	±%
National	J. D. H. Verster	Unopposed		
National hold				

=== Troyeville ===
General election 1933: Troyeville
Party	Candidate	Votes	%	±%
South African	Morris Kentridge	Unopposed		
South African hold				

=== Turffontein ===
General election 1933: Turffontein
Party	Candidate	Votes	%	±%
South African	Frederick Sturrock	Unopposed		
South African hold				

=== Ventersdorp ===
General election 1933: Ventersdorp
Party	Candidate	Votes	%	±%
Independent	Jacob Wilkens	2,776	59.9	New
National	J. J. L. Wernich	1,822	39.3	−13.1
Roos	E. A. Papendorf	6	0.1	New
Rejected ballots		33	0.7	+0.5
Majority		954	20.6	N/A
Turnout		4,637	80.6	−4.8
Independent gain from National		Swing	N/A	

=== Vereeniging ===
General election 1933: Vereeniging
Party	Candidate	Votes	%	±%
National	Karel Rood	Unopposed		
National hold				

=== Von Brandis ===
General election 1933: Von Brandis
Party	Candidate	Votes	%	±%
South African	J. W. Higgerty	2,488	73.4	+12.5
Roos	B. D. Coplans	857	25.3	New
Rejected ballots		43	1.3	+0.9
Majority		1,631	22.2	N/A
Turnout		3,388	49.2	−17.5
South African hold		Swing	N/A	

=== Vrededorp ===
General election 1933: Vrededorp
Party	Candidate	Votes	%	±%
South African	F. J. Roberts	2,389	51.3	−24.8
Roos	M. J. du Plessis	2,217	47.7	New
Rejected ballots		47	1.0	+0.4
Majority		172	3.7	N/A
Turnout		4,653	61.2	−13.9
South African hold		Swing	N/A	

=== Wakkerstroom ===
General election 1933: Wakkerstroom
Party	Candidate	Votes	%	±%
National	P. v. d. M. Martins	Unopposed		
National hold				

=== Waterberg ===
General election 1933: Waterberg
Party	Candidate	Votes	%	±%
National	J. G. Strijdom	Unopposed		
National hold				

=== Witbank ===
General election 1933: Witbank
Party	Candidate	Votes	%	±%
National	S. P. Bekker	2,436	61.5	+6.2
Independent	J. C. Miller	764	19.3	New
Independent	J. T. Robertson	743	18.8	New
Rejected ballots		20	0.4	-1.0
Majority		1,672	42.2	N/A
Turnout		3,963	70.1	−13.2
National hold		Swing	N/A	

=== Wolmaransstad ===
General election 1933: Wolmaransstad
Party	Candidate	Votes	%	±%
National	Jan Kemp	Unopposed		
National hold				

=== Wonderboom ===
General election 1933: Wonderboom
Party	Candidate	Votes	%	±%
National	H. D. van Broekhuizen	2,407	53.4	−12.3
Independent	P. A. Taljaard	1,527	33.9	New
Roos	E. Roux	528	11.7	New
Rejected ballots		49	1.0	-0.7
Majority		880	19.5	N/A
Turnout		4,511	67.6	−10.7
National hold		Swing	N/A	

=== Yeoville ===
General election 1933: Yeoville
Party	Candidate	Votes	%	±%
South African	Patrick Duncan	Unopposed		
South African hold				
