= Vrededorp (House of Assembly of South Africa constituency) =

- Former constituency for the South African House of Assembly
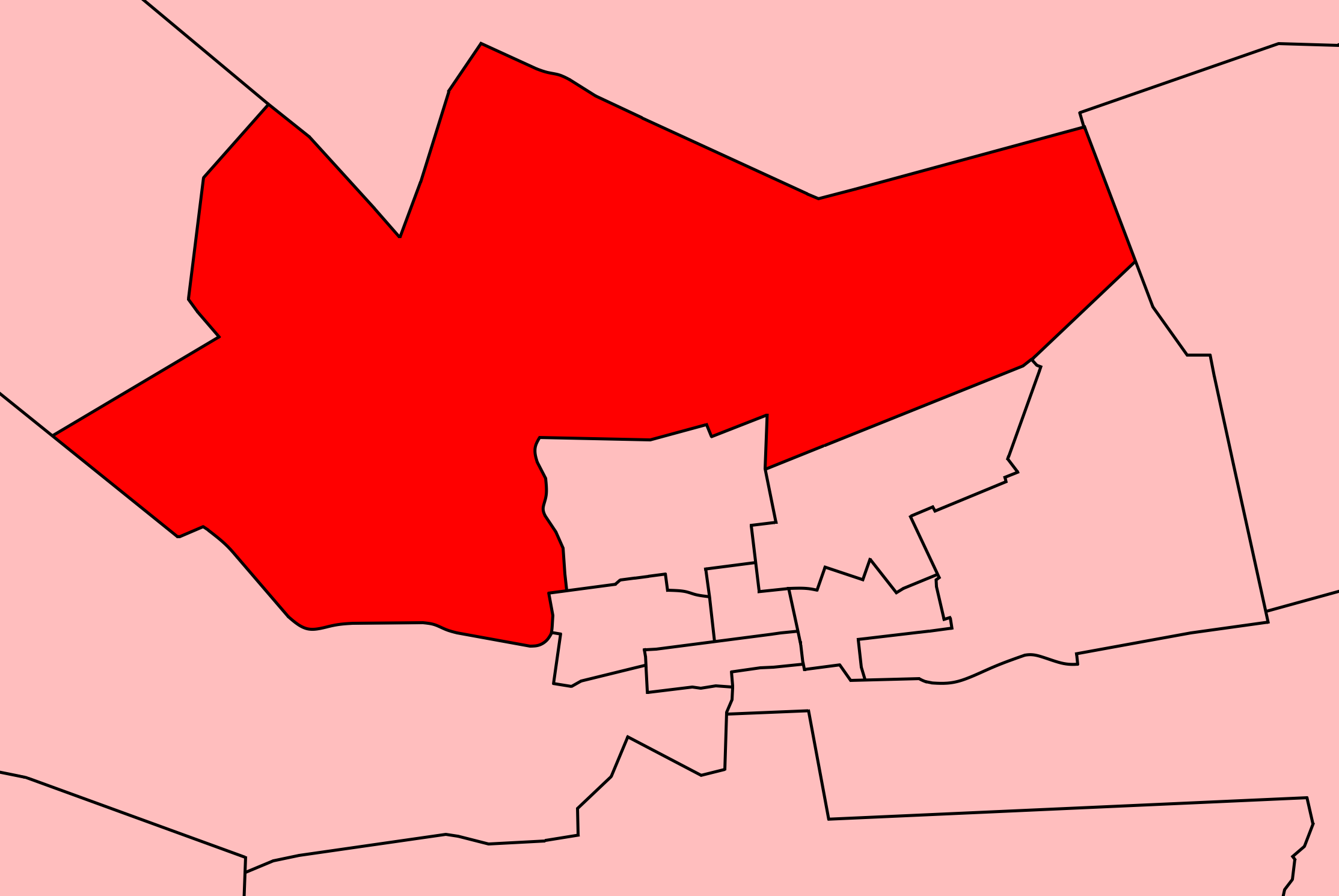
- Location of Vrededorp within Johannesburg (1910)
- Province: Transvaal
- Electorate: 9,511 (1938)

Former constituency
- Created: 1910
- Abolished: 1943
- Number of members: 1
- Last MHA: C. C. E. Badenhorst (UP)

Vrededorp was a constituency in the Transvaal Province of South Africa, which existed from 1910 to 1943. It covered a part of the inner western suburbs of Johannesburg centred on the suburb of Vrededorp. Throughout its existence it elected one member to the House of Assembly and one to the Transvaal Provincial Council.

== Franchise notes ==
When the Union of South Africa was formed in 1910, the electoral qualifications in use in each pre-existing colony were kept in place. In the Transvaal Colony, and its predecessor the South African Republic, the vote was restricted to white men, and as such, elections in the Transvaal Province were held on a whites-only franchise from the beginning. The franchise was also restricted by property and education qualifications until the 1933 general election, following the passage of the Women's Enfranchisement Act, 1930 and the Franchise Laws Amendment Act, 1931. From then on, the franchise was given to all white citizens aged 21 or over. Non-whites remained disenfranchised until the end of apartheid and the introduction of universal suffrage in 1994.

== History ==
Unusually among urban seats of the period, Vrededorp had a strong National Party presence through most of its existence. It was first taken by the party in 1920, with Dr. Thomas Christoffel Visser, who held it until 1929, always winning by very wide margins. When he retired in 1929, Frank Roberts of the South African Party took the seat by an equally imposing margin, and held it narrowly in 1933 over a supporter of Tielman Roos. Roberts left parliament in 1937, however, triggering a by-election that was won by Johannes Lodewyk Brill of the Purified National Party - the only Johannesburg seat ever held by that party. In 1938, he moved to the rural seat of Christiana, but lost his bid there, and Vrededorp also returned to the United Party fold with Carolina Cathrina Elizabeth Badenhorst, who represented it until its abolition in 1943.

== Members ==
| Election | Member | Party |
|---|---|---|
| 1910 | Lourens Geldenhuys | Het Volk |
| 1915 | Lourens Geldenhuys | South African |
| 1920 | T. C. Visser | National |
| 1921 | T. C. Visser | National |
| 1924 | T. C. Visser | National |
| 1929 | F. J. Roberts | South African |
| 1933 | F. J. Roberts | South African |
| 1934 | F. J. Roberts | United |
| 1937 by | J. L. Brill | GNP |
| 1938 | Carolina Cathrina Elizabeth Badenhorst | United |
| 1943 | Constituency abolished | |

== Detailed results ==
=== Elections in the 1910s ===
General election 1910: Vrededorp
| Party | Candidate | Votes | % | ±% |
|---|---|---|---|---|
| Het Volk | Lourens Geldenhuys | 1,059 | 58.6 | New |
| Unionist | N. C. Herschensohn | 601 | 33.2 | New |
| Independent | G. A. Roth | 148 | 8.2 | New |
| Majority | | 601 | 25.4 | N/A |
| Het Volk win (new seat) | | | | |

General election 1915: Vrededorp
| Party | Candidate | Votes | % | ±% |
|---|---|---|---|---|
| South African | Lourens Geldenhuys | 1,028 | 42.9 | −15.7 |
| National | T. C. Visser | 968 | 40.4 | New |
| Labour | C. A. Lagesen | 398 | 16.6 | New |
| Majority | | 60 | 1.5 | N/A |
| Turnout | | 2,394 | 80.7 | N/A |
| South African hold | | Swing | N/A | |

=== Elections in the 1920s ===
General election 1920: Vrededorp
| Party | Candidate | Votes | % | ±% |
|---|---|---|---|---|
| National | T. C. Visser | 1,370 | 75.6 | +35.2 |
| South African | W. P. Pistorius | 441 | 24.4 | −18.5 |
| Majority | | 929 | 51.2 | N/A |
| Turnout | | 1,811 | 62.9 | −17.8 |
| National gain from South African | | Swing | +26.9 | |

General election 1921: Vrededorp
| Party | Candidate | Votes | % | ±% |
|---|---|---|---|---|
| National | T. C. Visser | 1,442 | 78.6 | +3.0 |
| South African | P. Lourens | 384 | 20.9 | −3.5 |
| Independent | J. W. Wordingham | 8 | 0.4 | New |
| Majority | | 1,058 | 57.7 | +6.5 |
| Turnout | | 1,834 | 59.2 | −3.7 |
| National hold | | Swing | +3.3 | |

General election 1924: Vrededorp
| Party | Candidate | Votes | % | ±% |
|---|---|---|---|---|
| National | T. C. Visser | 1,783 | 82.9 | +4.3 |
| South African | C. J. Smith | 356 | 16.5 | −4.4 |
| Rejected ballots | | 13 | 0.6 | N/A |
| Majority | | 1,427 | 66.4 | +8.7 |
| Turnout | | 2,152 | 67.5 | +8.3 |
| National hold | | Swing | +4.4 | |

General election 1929: Vrededorp
| Party | Candidate | Votes | % | ±% |
|---|---|---|---|---|
| South African | F. J. Roberts | 1,770 | 76.1 | +59.6 |
| National | P. J. J. Wilsenach | 455 | 19.6 | −63.3 |
| Ind. National | H. C. M. Fouris | 86 | 3.7 | New |
| Rejected ballots | | 16 | 0.6 | +-0 |
| Majority | | 1,427 | 56.5 | N/A |
| Turnout | | 2,327 | 75.1 | +7.6 |
| South African gain from National | | Swing | +61.5 | |

=== Elections in the 1930s ===
General election 1933: Vrededorp
| Party | Candidate | Votes | % | ±% |
|---|---|---|---|---|
| South African | F. J. Roberts | 2,389 | 51.3 | −24.8 |
| Roos | M. J. du Plessis | 2,217 | 47.7 | New |
| Rejected ballots | | 47 | 1.0 | +0.4 |
| Majority | | 172 | 3.7 | N/A |
| Turnout | | 4,653 | 61.2 | −13.9 |
| South African hold | | Swing | N/A | |

Vrededorp by-election, 10 March 1937
| Party | Candidate | Votes | % | ±% |
|---|---|---|---|---|
| Purified National | J. L. Brill | 1,820 | 41.4 | New |
| United | S. J. Tighy | 1,345 | 30.6 | −20.7 |
| Labour | G. C. V. Odendaal | 1,209 | 27.5 | New |
| Rejected ballots | | 27 | 0.5 | -0.5 |
| Majority | | 475 | 10.8 | N/A |
| Turnout | | 4,401 | 56.3 | −4.9 |
| Purified National gain from South African | | Swing | N/A | |

General election 1938: Vrededorp
| Party | Candidate | Votes | % | ±% |
|---|---|---|---|---|
| United | Carolina Cathrina Elizabeth Badenhorst | 3,121 | 44.7 | New |
| Purified National | D. A. J. de Flemingh | 2,614 | 37.4 | New |
| Labour | G. C. V. Odendaal | 1,184 | 17.0 | New |
| Rejected ballots | | 63 | 0.9 | -0.1 |
| Majority | | 507 | 7.3 | N/A |
| Turnout | | 6,982 | 73.4 | +12.2 |
| United hold | | Swing | N/A | |
