= Denver (House of Assembly of South Africa constituency) =

- Former constituency for the South African House of Assembly
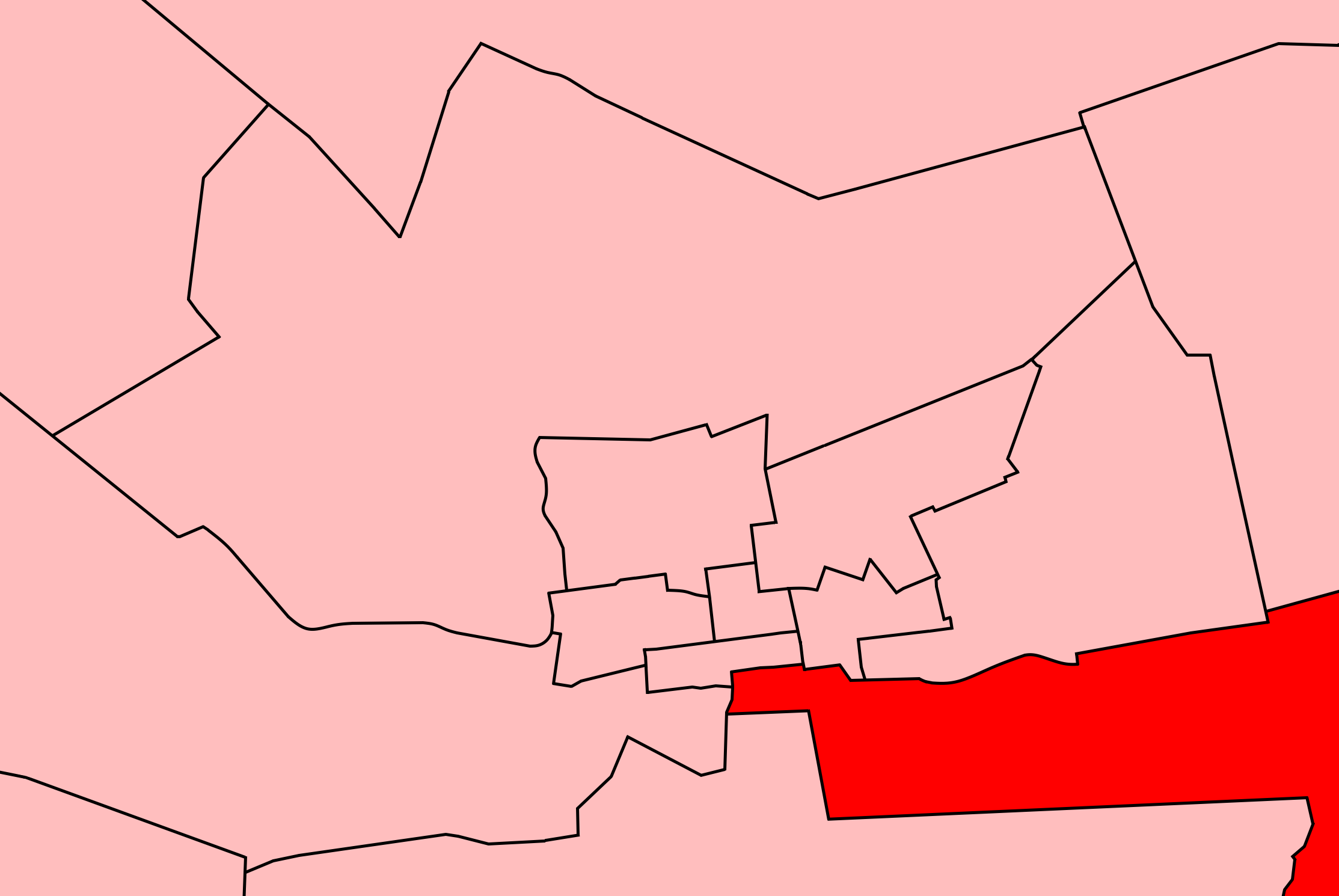
- Location of Denver within Johannesburg (1910)
- Province: Transvaal
- Electorate: 3,158 (1929)

Former constituency
- Created: 1910
- Abolished: 1933
- Number of members: 1
- Last MHA: Frederic Creswell (Lab)
- Replaced by: Kensington

Denver was a constituency in the Transvaal Province of South Africa, which existed from 1910 to 1933. It covered parts of the inner eastern suburbs of Johannesburg, centred on the suburb of Denver. Throughout its existence it elected one member to the House of Assembly and one to the Transvaal Provincial Council.

== Franchise notes ==
When the Union of South Africa was formed in 1910, the electoral qualifications in use in each pre-existing colony were kept in place. In the Transvaal Colony, and its predecessor the South African Republic, the vote was restricted to white men, and as such, elections in the Transvaal Province were held on a whites-only franchise from the beginning. The franchise was also restricted by property and education qualifications until the 1933 general election, following the passage of the Women's Enfranchisement Act, 1930 and the Franchise Laws Amendment Act, 1931. From then on, the franchise was given to all white citizens aged 21 or over. Non-whites remained disenfranchised until the end of apartheid and the introduction of universal suffrage in 1994.

== History ==
Denver was a largely working-class seat, and was closely fought between the Labour Party and various non-socialist candidates. Its final and most notable MP - the only one to represent the seat for more than a single term - was Labour leader Frederic Creswell, who moved there in 1924 after briefly representing the Durban seat of Stamford Hill. The seat was abolished in 1933, at which point Creswell moved to Bellville in the Cape Town suburbs.

== Members ==
Election	Member	Party
1910	Donald Macaulay	Unionist
1915	W. J. Parrack	Unionist
1920	T. E. Drew	Labour
1921	C. E. Nixon	SAP
1924	Frederic Creswell	Labour
1929	Frederic Creswell	Labour
1933	Constituency abolished	

== Detailed results ==
=== Elections in the 1910s ===
General election 1910: Denver
Party	Candidate	Votes	%	±%
Unionist	Donald Macaulay	866	57.1	New
Labour	T. Landye	652	42.9	New
Majority		214	14.2	N/A
Unionist win (new seat)				

General election 1915: Denver
Party	Candidate	Votes	%	±%
Unionist	W. J. Parrack	789	47.3	−9.8
Labour	J. J. Mulvey	538	32.2	−10.7
National	G. A. Hattingh	341	20.4	New
Majority		251	15.1	+0.9
Turnout		1,668	75.9	N/A
Unionist hold		Swing	+0.5	

=== Elections in the 1920s ===
General election 1920: Denver
Party	Candidate	Votes	%	±%
Labour	T. E. Drew	996	45.2	+13.0
Unionist	W. J. Parrack	667	30.2	−17.1
National	S. P. van Wijk	541	24.5	+4.1
Majority		329	15.0	N/A
Turnout		2,204	69.8	−6.1
Labour gain from Unionist		Swing	+15.1	

General election 1921: Denver
Party	Candidate	Votes	%	±%
South African	C. E. Nixon	961	42.9	+12.7
Labour	T. E. Drew	696	31.0	−14.2
National	J. J. B. Pohl	585	26.1	+1.6
Majority		265	11.9	N/A
Turnout		2,242	68.2	−1.6
South African gain from Labour		Swing	+13.5	

General election 1924: Denver
Party	Candidate	Votes	%	±%
Labour	Frederic Creswell	1,550	65.0	+24.0
South African	P. D. V. Alexander	800	33.6	−9.3
Independent	S. Scott	23	1.0	New
Rejected ballots		11	0.4	N/A
Majority		750	31.4	N/A
Turnout		2,384	80.0	+11.8
Labour gain from South African		Swing	+16.7	

General election 1929: Denver
Party	Candidate	Votes	%	±%
Labour (Creswell)	Frederic Creswell	1,311	51.8	-13.2
South African	H. J. Hofmeyr	1,102	43.5	+9.9
Labour (N.C.)	R. V. Hall	112	4.4	New
Rejected ballots		6	0.3	-0.1
Majority		209	8.3	−23.1
Turnout		2,531	80.2	+0.2
Labour hold		Swing	-11.6	
