= Kensington (House of Assembly of South Africa constituency) =

- Former constituency for the South African House of Assembly
- Province: Transvaal
- Electorate: 11,791 (1970)

Former constituency
- Created: 1933
- Abolished: 1974
- Number of members: 1
- Last MHA: G. D. G. Oliver (UP)
- Created from: Bezuidenhout; Denver

Kensington was a constituency in the Transvaal Province of South Africa, which existed from 1933 to 1974. It covered parts of the inner eastern suburbs of Johannesburg, centred on the suburb of Kensington. Throughout its existence it elected one member to the House of Assembly and one to the Transvaal Provincial Council.

== Franchise notes ==
When the Union of South Africa was formed in 1910, the electoral qualifications in use in each pre-existing colony were kept in place. In the Transvaal Colony, and its predecessor the South African Republic, the vote was restricted to white men, and as such, elections in the Transvaal Province were held on a whites-only franchise from the beginning. The franchise was also restricted by property and education qualifications until the 1933 general election, following the passage of the Women's Enfranchisement Act, 1930 and the Franchise Laws Amendment Act, 1931. From then on, the franchise was given to all white citizens aged 21 or over. Non-whites remained disenfranchised until the end of apartheid and the introduction of universal suffrage in 1994.

== History ==
Kensington was created in 1933, largely out of the abolished seat of Denver as well as Bezuidenhout, whose long-serving MP Leslie Blackwell moved to the new seat. Blackwell was initially elected for the South African Party, but like the bulk of that party, joined the United Party on its formation in 1934. Like most of Johannesburg, Kensington was a safe seat for the UP throughout its history, and all of Blackwell's successors would come from the same party - many of them elected unopposed. Its last MP, George Denzil Grant Oliver, left parliament on the seat's abolition in 1974, but stood for election in the Durban seat of Pinetown three years later, representing the conservative South African Party.

== Members ==
Election	Member	Party
1933	Leslie Blackwell	SAP
1934	Leslie Blackwell	United Party
1938	Leslie Blackwell	United Party
1943	T. P. Gray	United Party
1948	T. P. Gray	United Party
1949 by	P. A. Moore	United Party
1953	P. A. Moore	United Party
1958	P. A. Moore	United Party
1961	P. A. Moore	United Party
1966	P. A. Moore	United Party
1970	G. D. G. Oliver	United Party
1974	Constituency abolished	

== Detailed results ==
=== Elections in the 1930s ===
General election 1933: Kensington
Party	Candidate	Votes	%	±%
South African	Leslie Blackwell	3,048	71.1	New
Roos	J. L. Shurink	1,215	28.3	New
Rejected ballots		26	0.6	N/A
Majority		1,833	42.7	N/A
Turnout		4,289	61.3	N/A
South African win (new seat)				

General election 1938: Kensington
Party	Candidate	Votes	%	±%
United	Leslie Blackwell	3,198	54.6	−16.5
Dominion	E. T. Stubbs	2,618	44.7	New
Rejected ballots		36	0.7	+0.1
Majority		580	9.9	N/A
Turnout		5,852	78.4	+17.1
United hold		Swing	N/A	
