= Heidelberg (House of Assembly of South Africa constituency) =

Former constituency in the Transvaal Province of South Africa

- Former constituency for the South African House of Assembly
- Province: Transvaal
- Electorate: 13,208 (1970)

Former constituency
- Created: 1910
- Abolished: 1974
- Number of members: 1
- Last MHA: W. L. van der Merwe (NP)
- Replaced by: Meyerton

Heidelberg was a constituency in the Transvaal Province of South Africa, which existed from 1910 to 1974. Named after the town of Heidelberg, it covered a rural area in the southern Transvaal. Throughout its existence it elected one member to the House of Assembly and one to the Transvaal Provincial Council.

== Franchise notes ==
When the Union of South Africa was formed in 1910, the electoral qualifications in use in each pre-existing colony were kept in place. In the Transvaal Colony, and its predecessor the South African Republic, the vote was restricted to white men, and as such, elections in the Transvaal Province were held on a whites-only franchise from the beginning. The franchise was also restricted by property and education qualifications until the 1933 general election, following the passage of the Women's Enfranchisement Act, 1930 and the Franchise Laws Amendment Act, 1931. From then on, the franchise was given to all white citizens aged 21 or over. Non-whites remained disenfranchised until the end of apartheid and the introduction of universal suffrage in 1994.

== History ==
Like most of the rural Transvaal, Heidelberg had a largely Afrikaans-speaking electorate. It was a marginal seat early in its history, but as with most of rural South Africa, it became more and more safe for the National Party over time. Its most famous MP by far, representing the seat from 1958 until his assassination in 1966, was Hendrik Verwoerd, "architect of apartheid" and Prime Minister for nearly his entire time representing the constituency. His replacement, Willem Lodewicus van der Merwe, only represented Heidelberg for two terms before it was abolished, moving to the new seat of Meyerton in 1974.

== Members ==
Election	Member	Party
1910	Andries Stockenström	Het Volk
1912 by	W. W. J. J. Bezuidenhout	South African
1915	W. W. J. J. Bezuidenhout	South African
1920	W. W. J. J. Bezuidenhout	South African
1921	W. W. J. J. Bezuidenhout	South African
1924	S. D. de Wet	National
1929	S. D. de Wet	National
1933	S. D. de Wet	National
1934	S. D. de Wet	United
1937 by	D. A. S. de Bruyn	United
1938	D. A. S. de Bruyn	United
1943	H. J. L. van Niekerk	United
1948	S. H. Eyssen	HNP
1953	S. H. Eyssen	National
1958	Hendrik Verwoerd	National
1961	Hendrik Verwoerd	National
1966	Hendrik Verwoerd	National
1966 by	W. L. van der Merwe	National
1970	W. L. van der Merwe	National
1974	Constituency abolished	

== Detailed results ==
=== Elections in the 1910s ===
General election 1910: Heidelberg
Party	Candidate	Votes	%	±%
Het Volk	Andries Stockenström	1,061	61.8	New
Independent	F. J. Bezuidenhout	657	38.2	New
Majority		404	23.6	N/A
Het Volk win (new seat)				

Heidelberg by-election, 30 September 1912
Party	Candidate	Votes	%	±%
South African	W. W. J. J. Bezuidenhout	Unopposed		
South African hold				

General election 1915: Heidelberg
Party	Candidate	Votes	%	±%
South African	W. W. J. J. Bezuidenhout	1,459	67.3	+5.5
National	J. H. Gey van Pittius	709	32.7	New
Majority		750	34.6	N/A
Turnout		2,168	72.1	N/A
South African hold		Swing	N/A	

=== Elections in the 1920s ===
General election 1920: Heidelberg
Party	Candidate	Votes	%	±%
South African	W. W. J. J. Bezuidenhout	940	51.1	−16.2
National	M. J. Bekker	684	37.2	+4.5
Labour	A. D. Berkowitz	214	11.6	New
Majority		750	13.9	−20.7
Turnout		1,838	64.2	−7.9
South African hold		Swing	-10.4	

General election 1921: Heidelberg
Party	Candidate	Votes	%	±%
South African	W. W. J. J. Bezuidenhout	1,073	52.8	+1.7
National	S. D. de Wet	959	47.2	+10.0
Majority		750	5.6	−8.3
Turnout		2,032	62.5	−1.7
South African hold		Swing	-4.2	

General election 1924: Heidelberg
Party	Candidate	Votes	%	±%
National	S. D. de Wet	1,086	52.7	+5.5
South African	F. W. R. Robertson	965	46.8	−6.0
Rejected ballots		11	0.5	N/A
Majority		750	5.9	N/A
Turnout		2,062	80.4	+17.9
National gain from South African		Swing	+5.8	

General election 1929: Heidelberg
Party	Candidate	Votes	%	±%
National	S. D. de Wet	1,384	58.3	+5.6
South African	F. W. R. Robertson	981	41.3	−5.5
Rejected ballots		11	0.6	+0.1
Majority		403	17.0	+11.1
Turnout		2,376	88.7	+8.3
National hold		Swing	+5.6	

=== Elections in the 1930s ===
General election 1933: Heidelberg
Party	Candidate	Votes	%	±%
National	S. D. de Wet	Unopposed		
National hold				

Heidelberg by-election, 10 March 1937
Party	Candidate	Votes	%	±%
United	D. A. S. de Bruyn	1,638	39.7	New
Purified National	E. J. J. van der Horst	1,258	30.5	New
Independent	J. G. Meyer	1,197	29.0	New
Rejected ballots		30	0.8	-0.7
Majority		380	9.2	N/A
Turnout		4,123	64.6	N/A
United gain from National		Swing	N/A	

General election 1938: Heidelberg
Party	Candidate	Votes	%	±%
United	D. A. S. de Bruyn	2,876	59.8	N/A
Purified National	L. J. Buys	1,878	39.1	New
Rejected ballots		54	1.1	N/A
Majority		998	20.8	N/A
Turnout		4,808	77.2	N/A
United hold		Swing	N/A	
