= Wolmaransstad (House of Assembly of South Africa constituency) =

- Former constituency for the South African House of Assembly
- Province: Transvaal
- Electorate: 10,204 (1970)

Former constituency
- Created: 1910
- Abolished: 1974
- Number of members: 1
- Last MHA: G. P. van den Berg (NP)

Wolmaransstad was a constituency in the Transvaal Province of South Africa, which existed from 1910 to 1974. It covered a rural area in the western Transvaal, centred on the town of Wolmaransstad. Throughout its existence it elected one member to the House of Assembly and one to the Transvaal Provincial Council.

== Franchise notes ==
When the Union of South Africa was formed in 1910, the electoral qualifications in use in each pre-existing colony were kept in place. In the Transvaal Colony, and its predecessor the South African Republic, the vote was restricted to white men, and as such, elections in the Transvaal Province were held on a whites-only franchise from the beginning. The franchise was also restricted by property and education qualifications until the 1933 general election, following the passage of the Women's Enfranchisement Act, 1930 and the Franchise Laws Amendment Act, 1931. From then on, the franchise was given to all white citizens aged 21 or over. Non-whites remained disenfranchised until the end of apartheid and the introduction of universal suffrage in 1994.

== History ==
Like most of the rural Transvaal, Wolmaransstad was a conservative seat and had a largely Afrikaans-speaking electorate. It was held through most of its existence by the National Party, and for much of its early history by a single MP, Jan Kemp. Kemp was an Afrikaner nationalist who had participated in both the South African War and the Maritz rebellion, and following the latter conflict he was released early from prison in exchange for a promise not to enter politics, which he promptly broke by standing for election in 1920. He served in parliament until 1946, joining the United Party alongside J. B. M. Hertzog in 1934 and returning to the Herenigde Nasionale Party in 1939. He died in 1946, and his seat was briefly taken over by Ernest George Jansen, until he resigned to take up the position of Governor-General. The seat continued to be safe for the NP, now South Africa's governing party, until its abolition in 1974.

== Members ==
Election	Member	Party
1910	Hendrik de Waal	Het Volk
1915	E. J. J. van der Horst	National
1920	Jan Kemp	National
1921	Jan Kemp	National
1924	Jan Kemp	National
1929	Jan Kemp	National
1933	Jan Kemp	National
1934	Jan Kemp	United
1938	Jan Kemp	United
1939	Jan Kemp	HNP
1943	Jan Kemp	HNP
1947 by	Ernest George Jansen	HNP
1948	Ernest George Jansen	HNP
1950 by	L. M. Wentzel	National
1953	G. P. van den Berg	National
1958	G. P. van den Berg	National
1961	G. P. van den Berg	National
1966	G. P. van den Berg	National
1970	G. P. van den Berg	National
1974	Constituency abolished	

== Detailed results ==
=== Elections in the 1910s ===
General election 1910: Wolmaransstad
Party	Candidate	Votes	%	±%
Het Volk	Hendrik de Waal	Unopposed		
Het Volk win (new seat)				

General election 1915: Wolmaransstad
Party	Candidate	Votes	%	±%
National	E. J. J. van der Horst	1,439	53.7	New
South African	J. P. Jooste	1,239	46.3	N/A
Majority		200	7.4	N/A
Turnout		2,678	71.2	N/A
National gain from South African		Swing	N/A	

=== Elections in the 1920s ===
General election 1920: Wolmaransstad
Party	Candidate	Votes	%	±%
National	Jan Kemp	1,162	66.0	+12.2
South African	J. J. Hoffman	599	34.0	−12.3
Majority		563	32.0	+24.6
Turnout		1,761	65.1	−6.1
National hold		Swing	+12.3	

General election 1921: Wolmaransstad
Party	Candidate	Votes	%	±%
National	Jan Kemp	1,152	65.3	−0.7
South African	P. W. Botha	613	34.7	+0.7
Majority		539	30.6	−1.4
Turnout		1,765	60.9	−4.2
National hold		Swing	-0.7	

General election 1924: Wolmaransstad
Party	Candidate	Votes	%	±%
National	Jan Kemp	1,201	69.3	+4.0
South African	J. J. Lichtenberg	520	30.0	−4.7
Rejected ballots		11	0.7	N/A
Majority		681	39.3	+8.7
Turnout		1,732	71.0	+10.1
National hold		Swing	+4.4	

General election 1929: Wolmaransstad
Party	Candidate	Votes	%	±%
National	Jan Kemp	1,356	68.9	−0.4
South African	L. A. S. Lemmer	599	30.4	+0.4
Rejected ballots		14	0.7	+-0
Majority		757	38.5	−0.8
Turnout		1,969	81.9	+10.9
National hold		Swing	-0.4	

=== Elections in the 1930s ===
General election 1933: Wolmaransstad
Party	Candidate	Votes	%	±%
National	Jan Kemp	Unopposed		
National hold				

General election 1938: Wolmaransstad
Party	Candidate	Votes	%	±%
United	Jan Kemp	2,836	59.8	N/A
Purified National	H. C. W. van der Merwe	1,859	39.2	New
Rejected ballots		48	1.0	N/A
Majority		977	20.6	N/A
Turnout		4,743	90.9	N/A
United hold		Swing	N/A	
