= Von Brandis (House of Assembly of South Africa constituency) =

- Former constituency for the South African House of Assembly
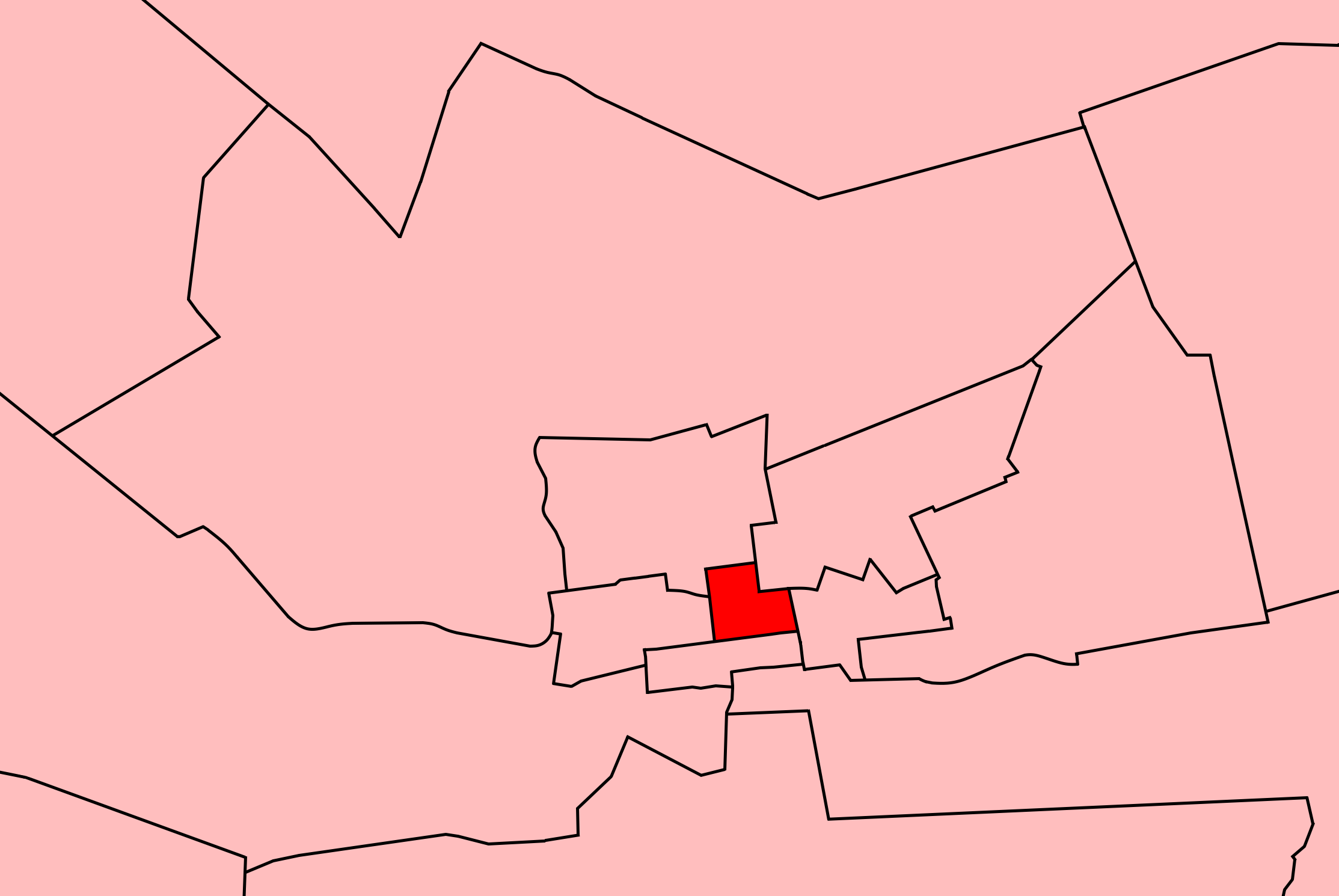
- Location of Von Brandis within Johannesburg (1910)
- Province: Transvaal
- Electorate: 13,674 (1977)

Former constituency
- Created: 1910
- Abolished: 1981
- Number of members: 1
- Last MHA: R. B. Durrant (NP)

Von Brandis was a constituency in the Transvaal Province of South Africa, which existed from 1910 to 1981. It covered the eastern half of the Johannesburg CBD. Throughout its existence it elected one member to the House of Assembly and one to the Transvaal Provincial Council.

== Franchise notes ==
When the Union of South Africa was formed in 1910, the electoral qualifications in use in each pre-existing colony were kept in place. In the Transvaal Colony, and its predecessor the South African Republic, the vote was restricted to white men, and as such, elections in the Transvaal Province were held on a whites-only franchise from the beginning. The franchise was also restricted by property and education qualifications until the 1933 general election, following the passage of the Women's Enfranchisement Act, 1930 and the Franchise Laws Amendment Act, 1931. From then on, the franchise was given to all white citizens aged 21 or over. Non-whites remained disenfranchised until the end of apartheid and the introduction of universal suffrage in 1994.

== History ==
Von Brandis, like many other Johannesburg seats, had a largely English-speaking and liberal electorate. Its parliamentary history was dominated by just two MPs: Emile Nathan, who was first elected as a Unionist in 1910 and stayed in the seat until 1932, having joined the South African Party along with most other Unionists in 1921, and John Waterston Higgerty, who was first elected for the SAP in 1933, joined the United Party shortly thereafter, and stayed in parliament until 1970, frequently going unopposed in the later part of his career. After Higgerty's retirement, the UP continued to hold the seat by a safe margin, but its electorate was divided after the party dissolved in 1977, with the majority supporting the Progressive Federal Party but a sizeable minority going to the more conservative New Republic Party, the UP's legal successor. This allowed the governing National Party to come through the middle in what was their biggest-ever nationwide victory. Robert Badenhorst Durrant of the NP would turn out to be Von Brandis' final MP, as the seat was abolished in the final delimitation of constituencies ahead of the 1981 general election.

== Members ==
Election	Member	Party
1910	Emile Nathan	Unionist
1915	Emile Nathan	Unionist
1920	Emile Nathan	Unionist
1921	Emile Nathan	South African
1924	Emile Nathan	South African
1929	Emile Nathan	South African
1932 by	T. F. Allen	South African
1933	J. W. Higgerty	South African
1934	J. W. Higgerty	United
1938	J. W. Higgerty	United
1943	J. W. Higgerty	United
1948	J. W. Higgerty	United
1953	J. W. Higgerty	United
1958	J. W. Higgerty	United
1961	J. W. Higgerty	United
1966	J. W. Higgerty	United
1970	I. F. A. de Villiers	United
1974	I. F. A. de Villiers	United
1977	R. B. Durrant	National
1981	Constituency abolished	

== Detailed results ==
=== Elections in the 1910s ===
General election 1910: Von Brandis
Party	Candidate	Votes	%	±%
Unionist	Emile Nathan	1,330	64.6	New
Independent	R. W. Jackson	729	35.4	New
Majority		601	29.2	N/A
Unionist win (new seat)				

General election 1915: Von Brandis
Party	Candidate	Votes	%	±%
Unionist	Emile Nathan	1,179	65.9	+1.3
Labour	W. J. McIntyre	611	34.1	New
Majority		568	31.8	N/A
Turnout		1,790	70.8	N/A
Unionist hold		Swing	N/A	

=== Elections in the 1920s ===
General election 1920: Von Brandis
Party	Candidate	Votes	%	±%
Unionist	Emile Nathan	1,064	67.0	+1.1
Labour	T. G. Jones	525	33.0	−1.1
Majority		568	34.0	+2.2
Turnout		1,589	49.9	−20.9
Unionist hold		Swing	+1.1	

General election 1921: Von Brandis
Party	Candidate	Votes	%	±%
South African	Emile Nathan	1,235	73.3	+6.3
Labour	M. J. Green	449	26.7	−6.3
Majority		568	46.6	+12.6
Turnout		1,684	51.2	+1.3
South African hold		Swing	+6.3	

General election 1924: Von Brandis
Party	Candidate	Votes	%	±%
South African	Emile Nathan	1,146	58.3	−15.0
Labour	J. M. Coplans	815	41.5	+14.8
Rejected ballots		4	0.2	N/A
Majority		331	16.8	−29.8
Turnout		1,965	70.3	+19.1
South African hold		Swing	-14.9	

General election 1929: Von Brandis
Party	Candidate	Votes	%	±%
South African	Emile Nathan	1,218	60.9	+2.6
Labour (N.C.)	G. A. Hay	774	38.7	−2.8
Rejected ballots		9	0.4	+0.2
Majority		444	22.2	+5.4
Turnout		2,001	66.7	−4.6
South African hold		Swing	+2.7	

=== Elections in the 1930s ===
Von Brandis by-election, 27 January 1932
Party	Candidate	Votes	%	±%
South African	T. F. Allen	1,736	69.0	+8.1
Labour	J. G. McQuade	755	30.0	−8.7
Rejected ballots		24	1.0	+0.6
Majority		981	39.0	+16.8
Turnout		2,515	47.2	−19.5
South African hold		Swing	+8.4	

General election 1933: Von Brandis
Party	Candidate	Votes	%	±%
South African	J. W. Higgerty	2,488	73.4	+12.5
Roos	B. D. Coplans	857	25.3	New
Rejected ballots		43	1.3	+0.9
Majority		1,631	22.2	N/A
Turnout		3,388	49.2	−17.5
South African hold		Swing	N/A	

General election 1938: Von Brandis
Party	Candidate	Votes	%	±%
United	J. W. Higgerty	4,240	74.5	+1.1
Dominion	B. D. Coplans	1,395	24.5	New
Rejected ballots		57	1.0	-0.3
Majority		2,845	50.0	N/A
Turnout		5,692	67.2	+18.0
United hold		Swing	N/A	
