= Lydenburg (House of Assembly of South Africa constituency) =

- Former constituency for the South African House of Assembly
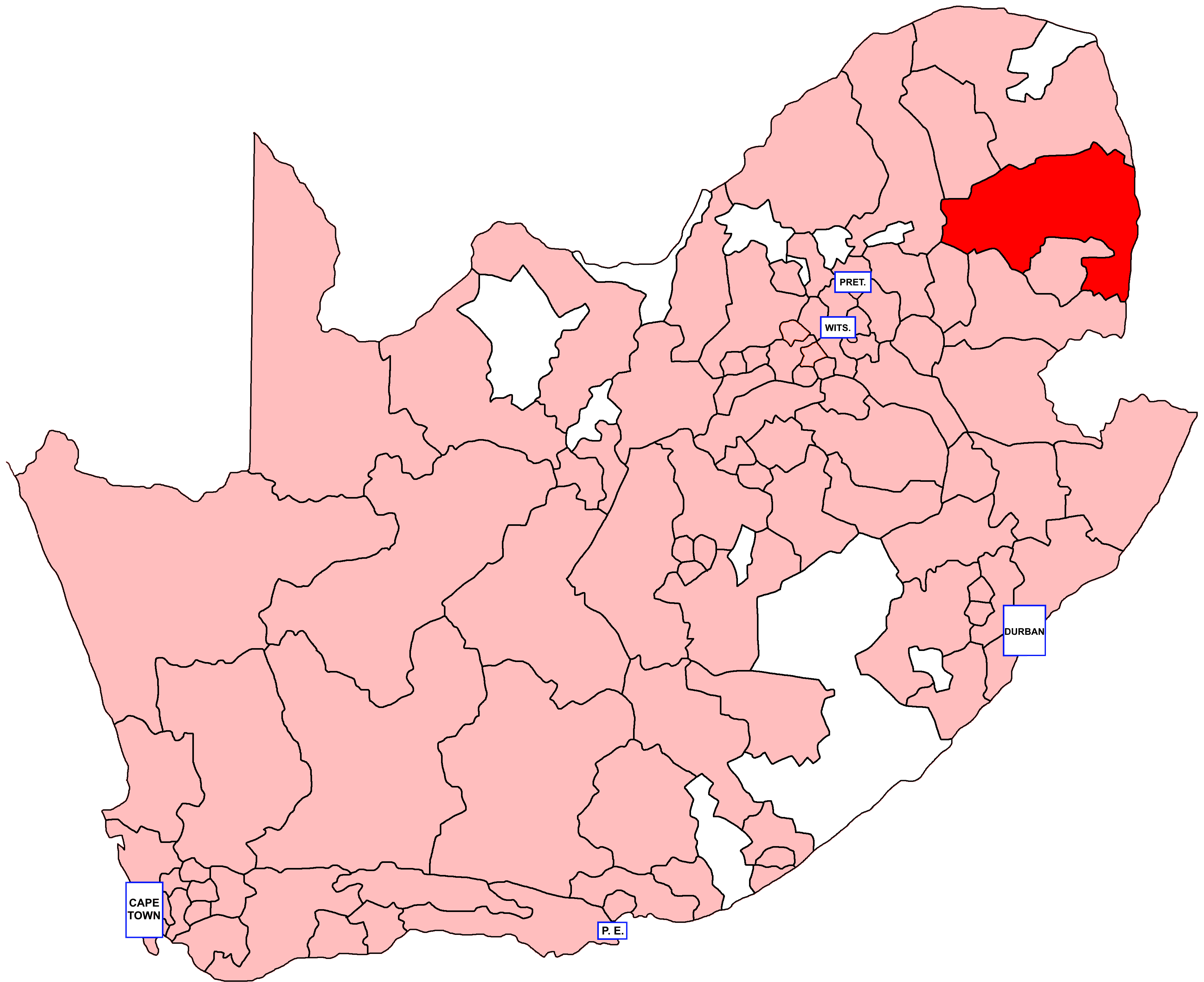
- Location of Lydenburg within South Africa (1981)
- Province: Transvaal
- Electorate: 16,925 (1989)

Former constituency
- Created: 1910
- Abolished: 1994
- Number of members: 1
- Last MHA: A. A. B. Bruwer (CP)
- Replaced by: Mpumalanga

Lydenburg, known as Lydenburg-Barberton between 1958 and 1966, was a constituency in the Transvaal Province of South Africa, which existed from 1910 to 1994. Named after the town of Lydenburg, it covered a rural area in the eastern Transvaal. Throughout its existence it elected one member to the House of Assembly and one to the Transvaal Provincial Council.

== Franchise notes ==
When the Union of South Africa was formed in 1910, the electoral qualifications in use in each pre-existing colony were kept in place. In the Transvaal Colony, and its predecessor the South African Republic, the vote was restricted to white men, and as such, elections in the Transvaal Province were held on a whites-only franchise from the beginning. The franchise was also restricted by property and education qualifications until the 1933 general election, following the passage of the Women's Enfranchisement Act, 1930 and the Franchise Laws Amendment Act, 1931. From then on, the franchise was given to all white citizens aged 21 or over. Non-whites remained disenfranchised until the end of apartheid and the introduction of universal suffrage in 1994.

== History ==
Like most of the rural Transvaal, Lydenburg had a largely Afrikaans-speaking electorate. In its early years, it was a marginal seat with a slight lean towards the South African Party, but over time it became more and more conservative and safe for the National Party, which held it from 1953 until 1989. Its final Nationalist MP, P. T. C. "Pietie" du Plessis, served in cabinet under P. W. Botha. He resigned from parliament in 1989, partly due to a growing financial scandal that would eventually see him convicted of fraud and sentenced to prison in 1993, and in its final election the seat was won by the hard-right Conservative Party.

== Members ==
Election	Member	Party
1910	C. J. J. Joubert	Het Volk
1915	J. L. Schurink	South African
1920	J. L. Schurink	South African
1921	Jacobus Nieuwenhuize	South African
1924	Jacobus Nieuwenhuize	South African
1929	Elias de Souza	National
1933	Elias de Souza	National
1934	Elias de Souza	United
1938	N. J. Schoeman	United
1943	F. J. Maré	United
1948	J. L. V. Liebenberg	Afrikaner
1953	J. L. V. Liebenberg	National
1958	E. C. A. Hiemstra	National
1961	E. C. A. Hiemstra	National
1966	J. J. P. Erasmus	National
1970	P. T. C. du Plessis	National
1974	P. T. C. du Plessis	National
1977	P. T. C. du Plessis	National
1981	P. T. C. du Plessis	National
1987	P. T. C. du Plessis	National
1989	A. A. B. Bruwer	Conservative
1994	Constituency abolished	

== Detailed results ==
=== Elections in the 1910s ===
General election 1910: Lydenburg
Party	Candidate	Votes	%	±%
Het Volk	C. J. J. Joubert	Unopposed		
Het Volk win (new seat)				

General election 1915: Lydenburg
Party	Candidate	Votes	%	±%
South African	J. L. Shurink	1,384	68.0	N/A
National	S. Hiemstra	651	32.0	New
Majority		723	36.0	N/A
Turnout		2,035	71.4	N/A
South African hold		Swing	N/A	

=== Elections in the 1920s ===
General election 1920: Lydenburg
Party	Candidate	Votes	%	±%
South African	J. L. Shurink	986	56.0	−12.0
National	F. P. Hoogenhout	776	44.0	+12.0
Majority		210	12.0	−24.0
Turnout		1,762	63.5	−7.9
South African hold		Swing	-12.0	

General election 1921: Lydenburg
Party	Candidate	Votes	%	±%
South African	Jacobus Nieuwenhuize	1,003	54.5	−1.5
National	F. P. Hoogenhout	836	45.5	+1.5
Majority		167	9.0	−3.0
Turnout		1,839	64.2	+0.7
South African hold		Swing	-1.5	

General election 1924: Lydenburg
Party	Candidate	Votes	%	±%
South African	Jacobus Nieuwenhuize	1,108	49.8	−4.7
National	E. de Souza	1,100	49.4	+3.9
Rejected ballots		18	0.8	N/A
Majority		8	0.4	−8.6
Turnout		2,226	82.2	+18.0
South African hold		Swing	-4.3	

General election 1929: Lydenburg
Party	Candidate	Votes	%	±%
National	Elias de Souza	1,184	55.2	+5.8
South African	Jacobus Nieuwenhuize	946	44.1	−5.7
Rejected ballots		18	0.8	N/A
Majority		238	11.1	N/A
Turnout		2,144	85.2	+3.0
National gain from South African		Swing	+5.8	

=== Elections in the 1930s ===
General election 1933: Lydenburg
Party	Candidate	Votes	%	±%
National	Elias de Souza	Unopposed		
National hold				

General election 1938: Lydenburg
Party	Candidate	Votes	%	±%
United	N. J. Schoeman	2,683	63.6	N/A
Purified National	H. Neethling	1,416	33.6	New
Independent	A. Op't Hof	94	2.2	New
Rejected ballots		26	0.6	N/A
Majority		1,357	30.0	N/A
Turnout		4,219	82.9	N/A
United hold		Swing	N/A	
