= Marico (House of Assembly of South Africa constituency) =

- Former constituency for the South African House of Assembly
- Province: Transvaal
- Electorate: 11,197 (1977)

Former constituency
- Created: 1910
- Abolished: 1981
- Number of members: 1
- Last MHA: L. M. Theunissen (NP)
- Replaced by: Lichtenburg

Marico was a constituency in the Transvaal Province of South Africa, which existed from 1910 to 1974. Named after the Marico River and/or the village of Groot Marico, it covered a rural area in the western Transvaal. Throughout its existence it elected one member to the House of Assembly and one to the Transvaal Provincial Council.

== Franchise notes ==
When the Union of South Africa was formed in 1910, the electoral qualifications in use in each pre-existing colony were kept in place. In the Transvaal Colony, and its predecessor the South African Republic, the vote was restricted to white men, and as such, elections in the Transvaal Province were held on a whites-only franchise from the beginning. The franchise was also restricted by property and education qualifications until the 1933 general election, following the passage of the Women's Enfranchisement Act, 1930 and the Franchise Laws Amendment Act, 1931. From then on, the franchise was given to all white citizens aged 21 or over. Non-whites remained disenfranchised until the end of apartheid and the introduction of universal suffrage in 1994.

== History ==
Like most of the rural Transvaal, Marico had a largely Afrikaans-speaking electorate. In its early years, it was a marginal seat with a slight lean towards the South African Party, whose leader Jan Smuts was popular in the Transvaal. Its first MP, Lodewijk Arnoldus Slabbert Lemmer, stood down in 1924, and at that election the seat was won by Johannes Jacobus Pienaar for the National Party. Pienaar followed J. B. M. Hertzog into the United Party in 1934, and held his seat in 1938, but left parliament shortly after the election. The resulting by-election was won by Reformed Church minister Charl Wynand Markelbach du Toit for the Purified National Party, the faction of the NP that had rejected the UP merger. From that point on, Marico was a Nationalist seat, though not a truly safe one until the UP decline of the 1950s. It was abolished in 1981, at which point most of it became part of the Lichtenburg constituency.

== Members ==
Election	Member	Party
1910	L. A. S. Lemmer	Het Volk
1915	L. A. S. Lemmer	South African
1920	L. A. S. Lemmer	South African
1921	L. A. S. Lemmer	South African
1924	J. J. Pienaar	National
1929	J. J. Pienaar	National
1933	J. J. Pienaar	National
1934	J. J. Pienaar	United
1938	J. J. Pienaar	United
1938 by	Charl Wynand Markelbach du Toit	GNP
1943	D. C. S. Grobler	HNP
1948	D. C. S. Grobler	HNP
1953	J. A. de Kock	National
1958	M. S. F. Grobler	National
1961	M. S. F. Grobler	National
1966	M. S. F. Grobler	National
1970	M. S. F. Grobler	National
1974	M. S. F. Grobler	National
1977	L. M. Theunissen	National
1981	Constituency abolished	

== Detailed results ==
=== Elections in the 1910s ===
General election 1910: Marico
Party	Candidate	Votes	%	±%
Het Volk	L. A. S. Lemmer	844	83.1	New
Independent	J. W. Viljoen	172	16.9	New
Majority		672	66.2	N/A
Het Volk win (new seat)				

General election 1915: Marico
Party	Candidate	Votes	%	±%
South African	L. A. S. Lemmer	1,194	63.1	−20.0
National	G. I. M. Wolmarans	698	36.9	New
Majority		496	26.2	N/A
Turnout		1,892	74.5	N/A
South African hold		Swing	N/A	

=== Elections in the 1920s ===
General election 1920: Marico
Party	Candidate	Votes	%	±%
South African	L. A. S. Lemmer	1,126	51.4	−11.7
National	A. W. de Waal	1,064	48.6	+11.7
Majority		62	2.8	−23.4
Turnout		2,190	74.9	+0.4
South African hold		Swing	-11.7	

General election 1921: Marico
Party	Candidate	Votes	%	±%
South African	L. A. S. Lemmer	1,211	50.0	−1.4
National	A. W. de Waal	1,211	50.0	+1.4
Majority		0	0.0	−2.8
Turnout		2,422	76.1	+1.2
South African hold		Swing	-1.4	

Election decided by lot.

General election 1924: Marico
Party	Candidate	Votes	%	±%
National	J. J. Pienaar	1,367	61.9	+11.9
South African	P. J. W. du Plessis	828	37.5	−12.5
Rejected ballots		13	0.6	N/A
Majority		539	24.4	+24.4
Turnout		2,208	86.8	+10.7
National gain from South African		Swing	+12.2	

General election 1929: Marico
Party	Candidate	Votes	%	±%
National	J. J. Pienaar	1,233	57.2	−4.7
South African	S. F. Hummelen	906	42.0	+4.5
Rejected ballots		18	0.8	+0.2
Majority		327	15.2	−9.2
Turnout		2,157	87.9	+1.1
National hold		Swing	-4.6	

=== Elections in the 1930s ===
General election 1933: Marico
Party	Candidate	Votes	%	±%
National	J. J. Pienaar	Unopposed		
National hold				

General election 1938: Marico
Party	Candidate	Votes	%	±%
United	J. J. Pienaar	2,533	53.5	N/A
Purified National	H. C. M. Fourie	2,179	46.0	New
Rejected ballots		24	0.5	N/A
Majority		354	7.5	N/A
Turnout		4,736	91.9	N/A
United hold		Swing	N/A	

Marico by-election, 12 October 1938
Party	Candidate	Votes	%	±%
Purified National	Charl W. M. du Toit	2,358	50.2	+4.2
United	S. J. van der Spuy	2,309	49.2	−4.3
Rejected ballots		27	0.6	+0.1
Majority		49	1.0	N/A
Turnout		4,694	87.7	−3.9
Purified National gain from United		Swing	+4.3	
