= Riversdale (House of Assembly of South Africa constituency) =

South African constituency, 1910–1943

- Riversdal
- Former constituency for the South African House of Assembly
- Province: Cape of Good Hope
- Electorate: 6,594 (1938)

Former constituency
- Created: 1910
- Abolished: 1943
- Number of members: 1
- Last MHA: P. K. Le Roux (NP)
- Replaced by: Bredasdorp; Mossel Bay

Riversdale (Afrikaans: Riversdal) was a constituency in the Cape Province of South Africa, which existed from 1910 to 1943. It covered a rural area along the Garden Route centred on the town of Riversdale. Throughout its existence it elected one member to the House of Assembly and one to the Cape Provincial Council.

== Franchise notes ==
When the Union of South Africa was formed in 1910, the electoral qualifications in use in each pre-existing colony were kept in place. The Cape Colony had implemented a “colour-blind” franchise known as the Cape Qualified Franchise, which included all adult literate men owning more than £75 worth of property (controversially raised from £25 in 1892), and this initially remained in effect after the colony became the Cape Province. As of 1908, 22,784 out of 152,221 electors in the Cape Colony were “Native or Coloured”. Eligibility to serve in Parliament and the Provincial Council, however, was restricted to whites from 1910 onward.

The first challenge to the Cape Qualified Franchise came with the Women's Enfranchisement Act, 1930 and the Franchise Laws Amendment Act, 1931, which extended the vote to women and removed property qualifications for the white population only – non-white voters remained subject to the earlier restrictions. In 1936, the Representation of Natives Act removed all black voters from the common electoral roll and introduced three “Native Representative Members”, white MPs elected by the black voters of the province and meant to represent their interests in particular. A similar provision was made for Coloured voters with the Separate Representation of Voters Act, 1951, and although this law was challenged by the courts, it went into effect in time for the 1958 general election, which was thus held with all-white voter rolls for the first time in South African history. The all-white franchise would continue until the end of apartheid and the introduction of universal suffrage in 1994.

== History ==
Like many rural constituencies across the Cape, Riversdale was a conservative seat with a largely Afrikaans-speaking electorate. In its existence, it only switched hands once: in 1921, when the incumbent South African Party were defeated by the National Party’s A. L. Badenhorst. Badenhorst stayed in the seat for more than twenty years, being one of the 19 Nationalist MPs who joined D. F. Malan’s Purified National Party, and died in office in January 1942, just over a year before the seat’s abolition. The resulting by-election was won by P. K. Le Roux, future cabinet minister, who would go on to represent several other constituencies after Riversdale’s abolition.

== Members ==
Election	Member	Party
1910	A. I. Vintcent	South African
1915	A. I. Vintcent	South African
1920	J. F. van Wyk	South African
1921	A. L. Badenhorst	National
1924	A. L. Badenhorst	National
1929	A. L. Badenhorst	National
1933	A. L. Badenhorst	National
1934	A. L. Badenhorst	GNP
1938	A. L. Badenhorst	GNP
1942 by	P. K. Le Roux	GNP
1943	constituency abolished	

== Detailed results ==
=== Elections in the 1910s ===
General election 1910: Riversdale
Party	Candidate	Votes	%	±%
South African	A. I. Vintcent	Unopposed		
South African win (new seat)				

General election 1915: Riversdale
Party	Candidate	Votes	%	±%
South African	A. I. Vintcent	1,740	57.0	N/A
National	J. F. Badenhorst	1,315	43.0	New
Majority		425	14.0	N/A
Turnout		3,055	89.3	N/A
South African hold		Swing	N/A	

=== Elections in the 1920s ===
General election 1920: Riversdale
Party	Candidate	Votes	%	±%
South African	J. F. van Wyk	1,734	50.6	−6.4
National	J. F. Badenhorst	1,690	49.4	+6.4
Majority		44	1.2	−12.8
Turnout		3,424	90.3	+1.0
South African hold		Swing	-6.4	

General election 1921: Riversdale
Party	Candidate	Votes	%	±%
National	A. L. Badenhorst	1,708	50.0	+0.6
South African	J. J. Michau	1,707	50.0	−0.6
Majority		1	0.0	N/A
Turnout		3,415	86.1	−4.2
National gain from South African		Swing	+0.6	

General election 1924: Riversdale
Party	Candidate	Votes	%	±%
National	A. L. Badenhorst	1,740	56.7	+6.7
South African	J. F. van Wyk	1,315	42.8	−7.2
Rejected ballots		16	0.5	N/A
Majority		425	13.9	+13.9
Turnout		3,071	89.8	+3.7
National hold		Swing	+7.0	

General election 1929: Riversdale
Party	Candidate	Votes	%	±%
National	A. L. Badenhorst	1,769	54.1	−2.6
South African	G. R. Hofmeyr	1,446	44.3	+1.5
Rejected ballots		53	1.4	+0.9
Majority		323	9.8	−4.1
Turnout		3,268	91.9	+2.1
National hold		Swing	-2.1	

=== Elections in the 1930s ===
General election 1933: Riversdale
Party	Candidate	Votes	%	±%
National	A. L. Badenhorst	3,040	61.8	+7.7
Independent	E. Morrison	1,817	37.0	New
Rejected ballots		60	1.2	-0.2
Majority		1,223	24.9	N/A
Turnout		4,917	74.8	−17.1
National hold		Swing	N/A	

General election 1938: Riversdale
Party	Candidate	Votes	%	±%
Purified National	A. L. Badenhorst	3,589	58.2	−3.6
United	A. L. D. van Wyk	2,520	40.9	New
Rejected ballots		58	0.9	-0.3
Majority		1,069	17.3	N/A
Turnout		6,167	93.5	+18.7
Purified National hold		Swing	N/A	
