= Boksburg North (House of Assembly of South Africa constituency) =

- Boksburg-Noord
- Former constituency for the South African House of Assembly
- Province: Transvaal
- Electorate: 6,023 (1933)

Former constituency
- Created: 1933
- Abolished: 1938
- Number of members: 1
- Last MHA: Colin Bain-Marais (Ind)
- Created from: Boksburg
- Replaced by: Boksburg

Boksburg North (Afrikaans: Boksburg-Noord) was a short-lived constituency in the Transvaal Province of South Africa, which existed only for the 1933 general election. It covered a part of the East Rand centred on the northern part of Boksburg. It elected one member to the House of Assembly and one to the Transvaal Provincial Council.

== Franchise notes ==
When the Union of South Africa was formed in 1910, the electoral qualifications in use in each pre-existing colony were kept in place. In the Transvaal Colony, and its predecessor the South African Republic, the vote was restricted to white men, and as such, elections in the Transvaal Province were held on a whites-only franchise from the beginning. The franchise was also restricted by property and education qualifications until the 1933 general election, following the passage of the Women's Enfranchisement Act, 1930 and the Franchise Laws Amendment Act, 1931. From then on, the franchise was given to all white citizens aged 21 or over. Non-whites remained disenfranchised until the end of apartheid and the introduction of universal suffrage in 1994.

== History ==
Boksburg North was only contested once, in 1933, when independent Colin Bain-Marais defeated a National Party candidate and two other independents. For every election before and after, Boksburg made up a single constituency. Bain-Marais moved to the newly-created seat of Orange Grove in Johannesburg's northern suburbs, which he held for the United Party for just over a year.

== Members ==
Election	Member	Party
1933	Colin Bain-Marais	Independent
1938	Constituency abolished	

== Detailed results ==
=== Elections in the 1930s ===
General election 1933: Boksburg North
Party	Candidate	Votes	%	±%
Independent	Colin Bain-Marais	2,006	40.8	New
National	F. D. Malan	1,345	27.4	New
Independent	P. A. Venter	1,041	21.2	New
Independent	A. J. Esterhuizen	491	10.0	New
Rejected ballots		31	0.6	N/A
Majority		661	13.5	N/A
Turnout		4,914	78.0	N/A
Independent win (new seat)				
