= Christiana (House of Assembly of South Africa constituency) =

- Former constituency for the South African House of Assembly
- Province: Transvaal
- Electorate: 10,318 (1970)

Former constituency
- Created: 1920
- Abolished: 1974
- Number of members: 1
- Last MHA: H. J. D. van der Walt (NP)
- Replaced by: Schweizer-Reneke

Christiana was a constituency in the Transvaal Province of South Africa, which existed from 1920 to 1974. Named after the town of Christiana, it covered a rural area in the western Transvaal. Throughout its existence it elected one member to the House of Assembly and one to the Transvaal Provincial Council.

== Franchise notes ==
When the Union of South Africa was formed in 1910, the electoral qualifications in use in each pre-existing colony were kept in place. In the Transvaal Colony, and its predecessor the South African Republic, the vote was restricted to white men, and as such, elections in the Transvaal Province were held on a whites-only franchise from the beginning. The franchise was also restricted by property and education qualifications until the 1933 general election, following the passage of the Women's Enfranchisement Act, 1930 and the Franchise Laws Amendment Act, 1931. From then on, the franchise was given to all white citizens aged 21 or over. Non-whites remained disenfranchised until the end of apartheid and the introduction of universal suffrage in 1994.

== History ==
Like most of the rural Transvaal, Christiana had a largely Afrikaans-speaking electorate. It was held for nearly its entire existence by the National Party, the exception being the period from 1934 to 1943, after J. B. M. Hertzog and Jan Smuts joined forces to create the United Party. Christiana MP Jan Johannes Wentzel joined the new party and successfully defended his seat in 1938, but retired at the 1943 general election, at which point the Herenigde Nasionale Party took the seat. In 1953, however, Wentzel came back, this time standing for the governing NP, and held the seat until 1970. In 1974, the constituency was replaced by one based in nearby Schweizer-Reneke, and Christiana's final MP, Hendrik Johannes Douw van der Walt, was elected to represent the new seat.

== Members ==
| Election | Member | Party |
|---|---|---|
| 1920 | A. S. van Hees | National |
| 1921 | A. S. van Hees | National |
| 1924 | H. H. Moll | National |
| 1929 | H. H. Moll | National |
| 1933 | J. J. Wentzel | National |
| 1934 | J. J. Wentzel | United |
| 1938 | J. J. Wentzel | United |
| 1943 | W. D. Brink | HNP |
| 1948 | W. D. Brink | HNP |
| 1953 | J. J. Wentzel | National |
| 1958 | J. J. Wentzel | National |
| 1961 | J. J. Wentzel | National |
| 1966 | J. J. Wentzel | National |
| 1970 | H. J. D. van der Walt | National |
| 1974 | Constituency abolished | |

== Detailed results ==
=== Elections in the 1920s ===
General election 1920: Christiana
| Party | Candidate | Votes | % | ±% |
|---|---|---|---|---|
| National | A. S. van Hees | 1,277 | 66.4 | New |
| South African | J. F. de Beer | 617 | 32.1 | New |
| Independent | A. J. van der Merwe | 29 | 1.5 | New |
| Majority | | 610 | 34.3 | N/A |
| Turnout | | 1,923 | 65.1 | N/A |
| National win (new seat) | | | | |

General election 1921: Christiana
| Party | Candidate | Votes | % | ±% |
|---|---|---|---|---|
| National | A. S. van Hees | 1,368 | 68.2 | +1.8 |
| South African | F. F. Pienaar | 639 | 31.8 | −0.3 |
| Majority | | 610 | 36.4 | +2.1 |
| Turnout | | 2,007 | 61.5 | −3.6 |
| National hold | | Swing | +1.1 | |

General election 1924: Christiana
| Party | Candidate | Votes | % | ±% |
|---|---|---|---|---|
| National | H. H. Moll | 834 | 64.2 | −4.0 |
| South African | A. J. Marais | 455 | 35.0 | New |
| Rejected ballots | | 10 | 0.8 | N/A |
| Majority | | 379 | 29.2 | N/A |
| Turnout | | 1,299 | 57.8 | −3.7 |
| National hold | | Swing | N/A | |

General election 1929: Christiana
| Party | Candidate | Votes | % | ±% |
|---|---|---|---|---|
| National | H. H. Moll | 1,239 | 63.2 | −1.0 |
| South African | H. I. Powell | 704 | 35.9 | +0.9 |
| Rejected ballots | | 17 | 0.9 | +0.1 |
| Majority | | 535 | 27.3 | −1.9 |
| Turnout | | 1,960 | 77.6 | +19.8 |
| National hold | | Swing | -1.0 | |

=== Elections in the 1930s ===
General election 1933: Christiana
| Party | Candidate | Votes | % | ±% |
|---|---|---|---|---|
| National | J. J. Wentzel | 3,061 | 73.0 | +9.8 |
| Roos | H. H. Moll | 1,068 | 25.5 | New |
| Rejected ballots | | 67 | 1.5 | +0.6 |
| Majority | | 1,993 | 47.5 | N/A |
| Turnout | | 4,196 | 75.2 | −2.4 |
| National hold | | Swing | N/A | |

General election 1938: Christiana
| Party | Candidate | Votes | % | ±% |
|---|---|---|---|---|
| United | J. J. Wentzel | 2,794 | 56.1 | −16.9 |
| Purified National | J. L. Brill | 2,148 | 43.1 | New |
| Rejected ballots | | 40 | 0.8 | -0.7 |
| Majority | | 646 | 13.0 | N/A |
| Turnout | | 4,982 | 85.8 | +10.6 |
| United hold | | Swing | N/A | |
