= Moorreesburg (House of Assembly of South Africa constituency) =

South African constituency, 1933–1981

- Former constituency for the South African House of Assembly
- Province: Cape of Good Hope
- Electorate: 12,114 (1977)

Former constituency
- Created: 1933
- Abolished: 1981
- Number of members: 1
- Last MHA: P. S. Marais (NP)
- Replaced by: Malmesbury; Piketberg

Moorreesburg was a constituency in the Cape Province of South Africa, which existed from 1933 to 1981. It covered a part of the Swartland region centred on the town of Moorreesburg. Throughout its existence it elected one member to the House of Assembly and one to the Cape Provincial Council.

== Franchise notes ==
When the Union of South Africa was formed in 1910, the electoral qualifications in use in each pre-existing colony were kept in place. The Cape Colony had implemented a “colour-blind” franchise known as the Cape Qualified Franchise, which included all adult literate men owning more than £75 worth of property (controversially raised from £25 in 1892), and this initially remained in effect after the colony became the Cape Province. As of 1908, 22,784 out of 152,221 electors in the Cape Colony were “Native or Coloured”. Eligibility to serve in Parliament and the Provincial Council, however, was restricted to whites from 1910 onward.

The first challenge to the Cape Qualified Franchise came with the Women's Enfranchisement Act, 1930 and the Franchise Laws Amendment Act, 1931, which extended the vote to women and removed property qualifications for the white population only – non-white voters remained subject to the earlier restrictions. In 1936, the Representation of Natives Act removed all black voters from the common electoral roll and introduced three “Native Representative Members”, white MPs elected by the black voters of the province and meant to represent their interests in particular. A similar provision was made for Coloured voters with the Separate Representation of Voters Act, 1951, and although this law was challenged by the courts, it went into effect in time for the 1958 general election, which was thus held with all-white voter rolls for the first time in South African history. The all-white franchise would continue until the end of apartheid and the introduction of universal suffrage in 1994.

== History ==
Like many rural constituencies across the Cape, Moorreesburg was a conservative seat with a largely Afrikaans-speaking electorate. It was held throughout its existence by the National Party, and only had two MPs over its 48-year history. Frans Erasmus, its first MP, was one of the 19 Nationalist MPs who joined D. F. Malan’s Purified National Party rather than follow the majority of the party into the United Party. He would continue to represent Moorreesburg in parliament until 1961, and became a cabinet minister after Malan won the premiership in 1948. He retired from parliament in 1961, and his successor, Pieter Sarel Marais, represented the seat until its abolition twenty years later.

== Members ==
Election	Member	Party
1933	Frans Erasmus	National
1934	Frans Erasmus	GNP
1938	Frans Erasmus	GNP
1943	Frans Erasmus	HNP
1948	Frans Erasmus	HNP
1953	Frans Erasmus	National
1958	Frans Erasmus	National
1961	P. S. Marais	National
1966	P. S. Marais	National
1970	P. S. Marais	National
1974	P. S. Marais	National
1977	P. S. Marais	National
1981	constituency abolished	

== Detailed results ==
=== Elections in the 1930s ===
General election 1933: Moorreesburg
Party	Candidate	Votes	%	±%
National	Frans Erasmus	2,923	61.4	New
Independent	J. J. de Kock	1,788	37.5	New
Independent	W. H. Lategan	15	0.3	New
Rejected ballots		38	0.8	N/A
Majority		1,135	23.8	N/A
Turnout		4,764	76.1	N/A
National win (new seat)				

General election 1938: Moorreesburg
Party	Candidate	Votes	%	±%
Purified National	Frans Erasmus	3,545	56.4	−5.0
United	A. A. Melck	2,632	41.9	New
Rejected ballots		108	1.7	+0.9
Majority		408	14.5	N/A
Turnout		6,285	86.1	+10.0
Purified National hold		Swing	N/A	
