= Mossel Bay (House of Assembly of South Africa constituency) =

South African constituency, 1933–1994

- Mosselbaai
- Former constituency for the South African House of Assembly
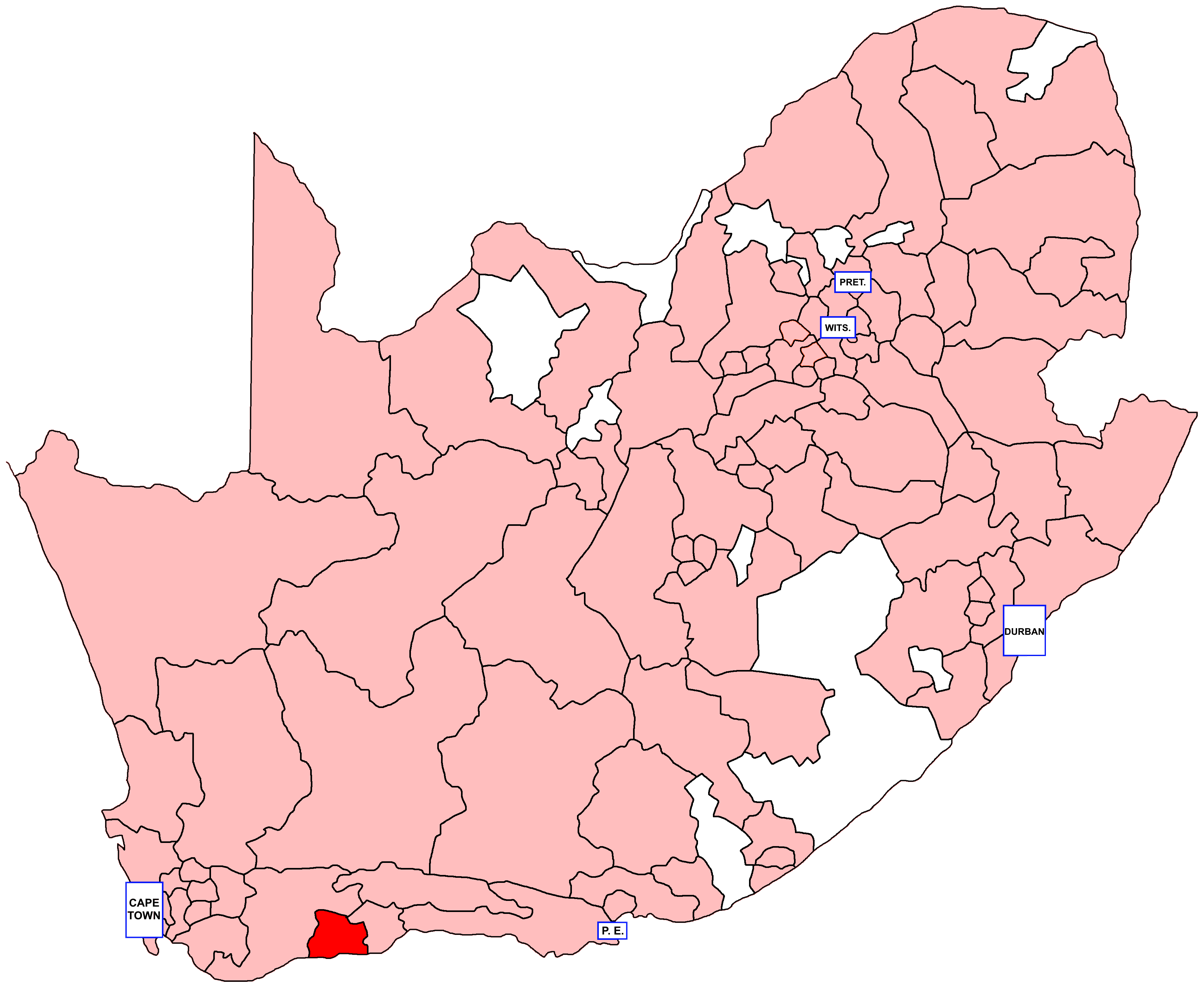
- Location of Mossel Bay within South Africa (1981)
- Province: Cape of Good Hope
- Electorate: 15,204 (1989)

Former constituency
- Created: 1933
- Abolished: 1994
- Number of members: 1
- Last MHA: H. M. J. van Rensburg (NP)
- Replaced by: Western Cape

Mossel Bay (Afrikaans: Mosselbaai) was a constituency in the Cape Province of South Africa, which existed from 1933 to 1994. It covered a part of the Garden Route centred on the town of Mossel Bay. Throughout its existence it elected one member to the House of Assembly and one to the Cape Provincial Council.

== Franchise notes ==
When the Union of South Africa was formed in 1910, the electoral qualifications in use in each pre-existing colony were kept in place. The Cape Colony had implemented a “colour-blind” franchise known as the Cape Qualified Franchise, which included all adult literate men owning more than £75 worth of property (controversially raised from £25 in 1892), and this initially remained in effect after the colony became the Cape Province. As of 1908, 22,784 out of 152,221 electors in the Cape Colony were “Native or Coloured”. Eligibility to serve in Parliament and the Provincial Council, however, was restricted to whites from 1910 onward.

The first challenge to the Cape Qualified Franchise came with the Women's Enfranchisement Act, 1930 and the Franchise Laws Amendment Act, 1931, which extended the vote to women and removed property qualifications for the white population only – non-white voters remained subject to the earlier restrictions. In 1936, the Representation of Natives Act removed all black voters from the common electoral roll and introduced three “Native Representative Members”, white MPs elected by the black voters of the province and meant to represent their interests in particular. A similar provision was made for Coloured voters with the Separate Representation of Voters Act, 1951, and although this law was challenged by the courts, it went into effect in time for the 1958 general election, which was thus held with all-white voter rolls for the first time in South African history. The all-white franchise would continue until the end of apartheid and the introduction of universal suffrage in 1994.

== History ==
Like many constituencies in the rural Cape, the electorate of Mossel Bay was largely Afrikaans-speaking and conservative, and the seat was held nearly throughout its existence by the National Party. Its first MP, Jacobus Johannes Scholtz, followed J. B. M. Hertzog and the majority of Nationalists into the United Party in 1934, and was defeated for re-election in 1938 by Petrus Johan van Nierop, of the hardline Purified National Party. Van Nierop remained Mossel Bay's MP until 1964, and the National Party continued to hold the seat until the end of apartheid.

== Members ==
Election	Member	Party
1933	J. J. Scholtz	National
1934	J. J. Scholtz	United
1938	P. J. van Nierop	GNP
1943	P. J. van Nierop	HNP
1948	P. J. van Nierop	HNP
1953	P. J. van Nierop	National
1958	P. J. van Nierop	National
1961	P. J. van Nierop	National
1964 by	M. J. Rall	National
1966	M. J. Rall	National
1970	M. J. Rall	National
1974	M. J. Rall	National
1977	H. M. J. van Rensburg	National
1981	H. M. J. van Rensburg	National
1987	H. M. J. van Rensburg	National
1989	H. M. J. van Rensburg	National
1994	constituency abolished	

== Detailed results ==
=== Elections in the 1930s ===
General election 1933: Mossel Bay
Party	Candidate	Votes	%	±%
National	J. J. Scholtz	3,129	57.5	New
Independent	H. C. Muller	2,214	40.7	New
Rejected ballots		101	1.8	N/A
Majority		915	16.8	N/A
Turnout		5,444	80.7	N/A
National win (new seat)				

General election 1938: Mossel Bay
Party	Candidate	Votes	%	±%
Purified National	P. J. van Nierop	3,377	51.6	New
United	J. J. Scholtz	3,114	47.6	−9.9
Rejected ballots		56	0.8	-1.0
Majority		263	4.0	N/A
Turnout		6,547	92.5	+11.8
Purified National gain from United		Swing	N/A	
