= Bellville (House of Assembly of South Africa constituency) =

- Former constituency for the South African House of Assembly
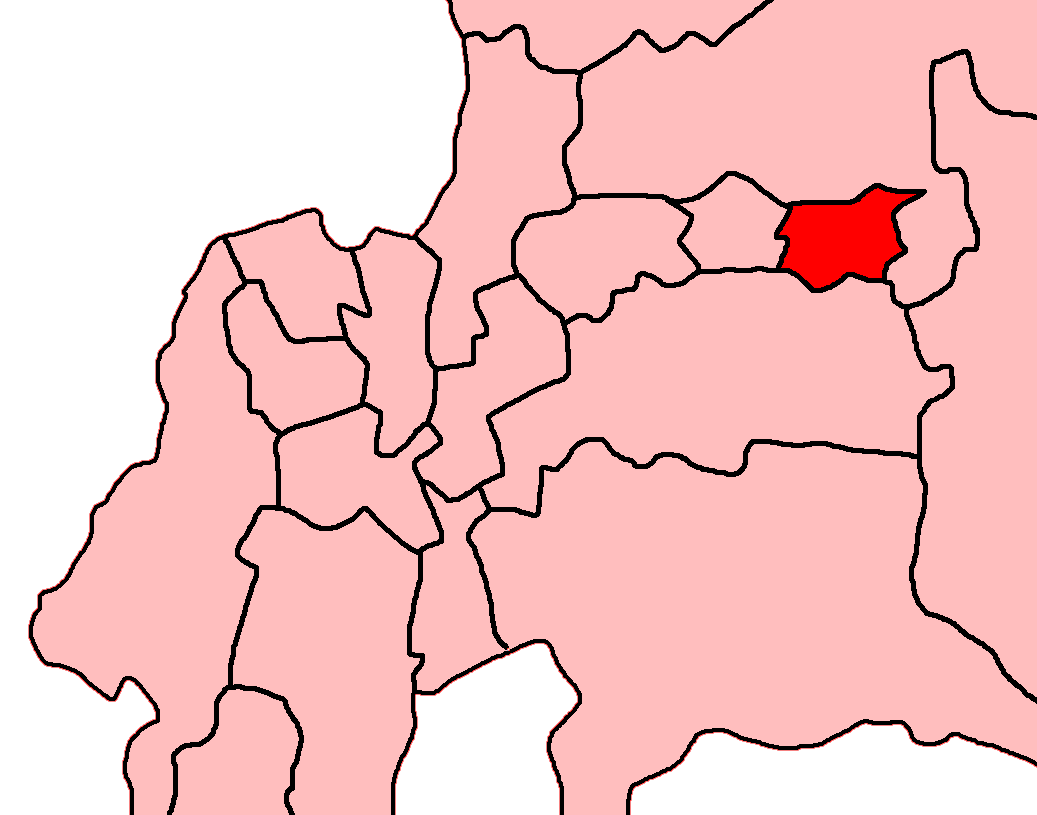
- Location of Bellville within Cape Town (1981)
- Province: Cape of Good Hope
- Electorate: 15,200 (1989)

Former constituency
- Created: 1933
- Abolished: 1994
- Number of members: 1
- Last MHA: Cornelius Ackermann (NP)
- Replaced by: Western Cape

Bellville was a constituency in the Cape Province of South Africa, which existed from 1933 to 1938 and again from 1953 (initially under the name Bellville-Parow) to 1994. It was centred on the railway junction of Bellville, and covered various areas of Cape Town’s eastern suburbs. Throughout its existence it elected one member to the House of Assembly and one to the Cape Provincial Council.

== Franchise notes ==
When the Union of South Africa was formed in 1910, the electoral qualifications in use in each pre-existing colony were kept in place. The Cape Colony had implemented a "colour-blind" franchise known as the Cape Qualified Franchise, which included all adult literate men owning more than £75 worth of property (controversially raised from £25 in 1892), and this initially remained in effect after the colony became the Cape Province. As of 1908, 22,784 out of 152,221 electors in the Cape Colony were "Native or Coloured". Eligibility to serve in Parliament and the Provincial Council, however, was restricted to whites from 1910 onward.

The first challenge to the Cape Qualified Franchise came with the Women's Enfranchisement Act, 1930 and the Franchise Laws Amendment Act, 1931, which extended the vote to women and removed property qualifications for the white population only – non-white voters remained subject to the earlier restrictions. In 1936, the Representation of Natives Act removed all black voters from the common electoral roll and introduced three "Native Representative Members", white MPs elected by the black voters of the province and meant to represent their interests in particular. A similar provision was made for Coloured voters with the Separate Representation of Voters Act, 1951, and although this law was challenged by the courts, it went into effect in time for the 1958 general election, which was thus held with all-white voter rolls for the first time in South African history. The all-white franchise would continue until the end of apartheid and the introduction of universal suffrage in 1994.

== History ==
The first iteration of the Bellville constituency was created in 1933, replacing the seat of Cape Flats, and was once again renamed Cape Flats for the next election in 1938. Its sole MP was Frederic Creswell, one-time leader of the Labour Party, who was the only Labour MP elected in the Cape Province that year.

Bellville returned in 1953, initially called Bellville-Parow – however, Parow was split off to form its own seat in 1958. Like much of the eastern suburbs of Cape Town, Bellville was a largely working-class, Afrikaans-speaking seat, and a stronghold for the National Party.

== Members ==
Election	Member	Party
1933	Frederic Creswell	Labour
1938	constituency abolished	

Election	Member	Party
1953	Jan Haak	National
1958	Jan Haak	National
1961	Jan Haak	National
1966	Jan Haak	National
1970	Jan Haak	National
1970 by	Louis Pienaar	National
1974	Louis Pienaar	National
1975 by	A. T. van der Walt	National
1977	A. T. van der Walt	National
1981	A. T. van der Walt	National
1987	A. T. van der Walt	National
1989	Cornelius Ackermann	National
1994	constituency abolished	

== Detailed results ==
=== Elections in the 1930s ===
General election 1933: Bellville
Party	Candidate	Votes	%	±%
Labour	Frederic Creswell	2,307	47.4	New
Independent	J. W. Mushert	1,842	37.9	New
Independent	D. J. Cloete	716	14.7	New
Majority		465	9.5	N/A
Turnout		4,865	76.0	N/A
Labour win (new seat)				
