= Het Volk (political party) =

Transvaal political party

Map of the results of the 1907 Transvaal election, which saw Het volk candidates win a majority of seats.

Het Volk (The People) was a Transvaal political party, established in May 1904 under the leadership of Louis Botha and his deputy Jan Smuts.

Upon the creation of the Union of South Africa in May 1910, it merged with Afrikaner Bond, the South African Party, and the Orangia Unie, the dominant political parties of the Cape Colony and Orange River Colony (formerly the Orange Free State), creating the pan-Union South African Party.

== See also ==
- Ewald Auguste Esselen, one of the founding members of Het Volk.
