= Tielman Roos =

South African politician

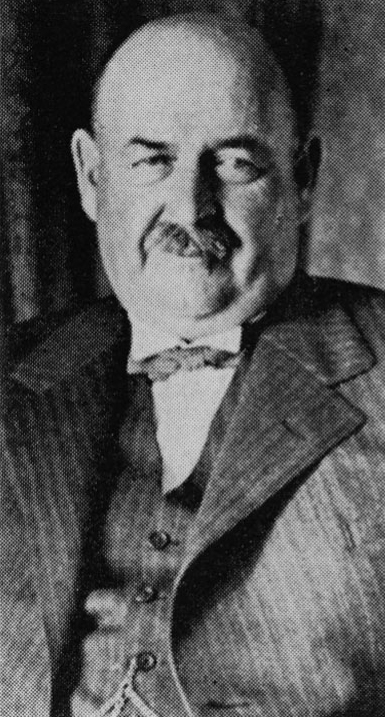

South African Minister for Justice
- In office 1924–1929
- Prime Minister: J. B. M. Hertzog
- Preceded by: Nicolaas Jacobus de Wet
- Succeeded by: Oswald Pirow

Personal details
- Born: 8 May 1879 Cape Town
- Died: 28 March 1935 (aged 55)
- Party: South African Party; National Party; Central (Roos) Party
- Profession: Judge

Tielman Johannes de Villiers Roos (8 May 1879 – 28 March 1935) was a South African politician and South African Minister for Justice from 1924 to 1929.

== Labour politics ==
Roos made his name as the leader of a group of young members of the South African Party who were opposed to the creation of the Union of South Africa by Louis Botha. Roos and his followers fell in with Daniel François Malan and he was a founding member of the National Party. As head of the party in Transvaal Roos sought to build a following amongst the white workers in the area, supporting mine workers' strikes in 1918. Using his as his personal slogan "workers of the world unite and fight for a white South Africa", he was a regular speaker at a series of events in 1922 when white miners went back on strike over wage cuts and an increase in the proportion of black workers allowed. Roos' connections to the working class voters was instrumental in securing the National Party's coalition with the South African Labour Party that led to their victory in the 1924 election. Indeed attempts between the two parties to reach an agreement during the 1922 strike were even known as "Roos's Parliament" such was his influence at the time.

== In government ==
Roos would serve as Justice Minister from 1924 to 1929.

In government he was a strong advocate of racial segregation, but despite this he defended the rights of the Industrial and Commercial Workers' Union to organise amongst Black workers in Durban. He also continued his policy of reaching out to the workers, describing the Labour Party as 'brothers' of the National Party and encouraged working class voters to join the party.

== Gold standard ==
Roos spent three years as a judge in the Supreme Court of Appeal but resigned after criticizing Prime Minister of South Africa James Barry Munnik Hertzog due to a lack of plans to come off the gold standard. He then used this issue to relaunch his political career. Roos proposed an alliance with Jan Smuts to ensure he got his way, although the former PM was unwilling as Roos wanted the Premiership for himself. Ultimately however Roos personal popularity ensured that his demands were agreed to with Finance Minister N.C. Havenga taking the country off gold in a move that led to a widespread economic up-turn.

This success of sorts was to be Roos' final contribution to South African politics as, although it had initially been his campaign, support dwindled after the country came off gold. Roos would die soon afterwards. He was a South African Freemason.

Academic offices
Preceded by	Chancellor of the University of Pretoria; 1930– 1932	Succeeded by Adriaan Louw
