= Transvaal Provincial Council =

Provincial council in Transvaal, South Africa

Provincial Council of Transvaal Province

Type
- Type: Unicameral house

History
- Founded: 15 September 1910
- Disbanded: 1986

The Transvaal Provincial Council was the provincial council of the Transvaal Province in South Africa. It was created by the South Africa Act 1909, from the formation of the Union of South Africa on 31 May 1910, and replaced the Transvaal Legislative Assembly which had been created through self-government in 1907. The first election to the provincial council took place on 15 September 1910 (also the day of the South African general election, 1910).

The Provincial Council continued to exist until 1986, when its functions were transferred to a strengthened executive authority appointed by the State President. The province itself was disbanded in 1994, when the provinces were reconstructed.

== Election system and terms ==
The Provincial Council was composed of members elected, by the first past the post electoral system, from the same single member electoral divisions as were used for the House of Assembly elections.

Originally the term of the Provincial Council was five years, from the first meeting of the council after it was elected. The Administrator of the province fixed the date for the meeting, but the Provincial Council had to meet at least once a year. The South African Parliament could alter the term by legislation (as it did when the provincial elections due in 1941 were postponed until 1943), but there was no general power to dissolve a Provincial Council before its statutory term expired.

Under the Constitution and Elections Amendment Act 1973, the State President was given the power to dissolve the Provincial Councils at the same time as the House of Assembly, so that the subsequent provincial election could take place on the same day as a Parliamentary general election.

== Executive committee ==
Executive powers were shared by the administrator and an executive committee. This arrangement was neither the traditional 'Westminster' model (such as that which existed at the Union level of government) or a United States style separation of powers between the executive and legislative parts of the government.

The administrator of the province was described, in section 68 (1) of the South Africa Act 1909, as "a chief executive officer … in whose name all executive acts relating to provincial affairs therein shall be done".

The administrator was appointed, by the national government, for a five-year term and could not be removed except by the Governor General for "cause assigned". The administrator was not responsible to the provincial council and it had no power to remove him from office. The administrator was the chairman of the provincial executive committee and had both an original and casting vote in its deliberations.

The provincial council elected four persons (usually members of the provincial council), who together with the administrator formed the provincial executive committee. The four members were elected by single transferable vote, so were not necessarily all from the same party.

It was provided, by Section 80 of the South Africa Act 1909, that "the executive committee shall on behalf of the provincial council carry on the administration of provincial affairs'’.

== Controversies ==
In 1914, the South African Labour Party had a small majority in the Transvaal Provincial Council. It refused to take up the two seats on the executive committee, which the party could have filled, because it considered that an administrator appointed by a South African Party government would join forces with the provincial minority parties to out-vote Labour on the committee.

A deadlock resulted, when the Labour Party objected to certain taxation proposals of the executive committee. The Provincial Council refused to vote supply. The Union Parliament had to legislate to provide funds, to avoid the collapse of the provincial public service.

In 1917 there was a position in which four different parties had one seat each on the executive committee. A partial deadlock resulted.

In 1924, the National Party-Labour pact government came to power at the Union level. However, as the office of administrator was not considered a party political one, the South African Party appointed provincial administrators continued in office.

In the Transvaal, the administrator was Jan Hofmeyr (later in his career a leading politician on the liberal wing of the United Party). As the Nationalist and Labour members had a majority on the provincial council, they demanded a change of administrator. The provincial council passed a motion of no confidence in the administrator on 11 March 1925. However, the Prime Minister supported Hofmeyr continuing in office, which he did until the end of his term.

== Election results, by party 1936–1981 ==
Election	NP	UP	Lab	PFP	Dom	Ind	vac	Total
1936	2	48	6	–	1	–	–	57
1943	9	43	12	–	–	–	–	64
1949	34	27	2	–	–	2	1	66
1954	45	23	–	–	–	–	–	68
1959	48	20	–	–	–	–	–	68
1965	51	17	–	–	–	–	–	68
1970	54	19	–	–	–	–	–	73
1974	61	13	–	2	–	–	–	76
1977	65	1	–	10	–	–	–	76
1981	67	–	–	9	–	–	–	76

Key to parties:-

- NP: Purified National Party (1936), Reunited National Party (1943–1949), National Party (1954–1981)
- UP: United Party (1936–1974), New Republic Party (1977)
- Lab: South African Labour Party
- PFP: Progressive Party (1974), Progressive Federal Party (1977–1981)
- Dom Dominion Party
- Ind Independent
- vac Vacant seat

== Well-known members ==
- Hendrik Prinsloo (1940–1956)
- Clive Derby-Lewis (1972–1981)
- Harry Schwarz (1958–1974) – Leader of the Opposition
- Douglas Gibson (1970–1986) – Leader of the Opposition
