= 1933 South African general election =

- 17 May 1933

All 150 seats in the House of Assembly 76 seats needed for a majority
- Registered: 957,636
- Turnout: 33.77% (▼41.57pp)
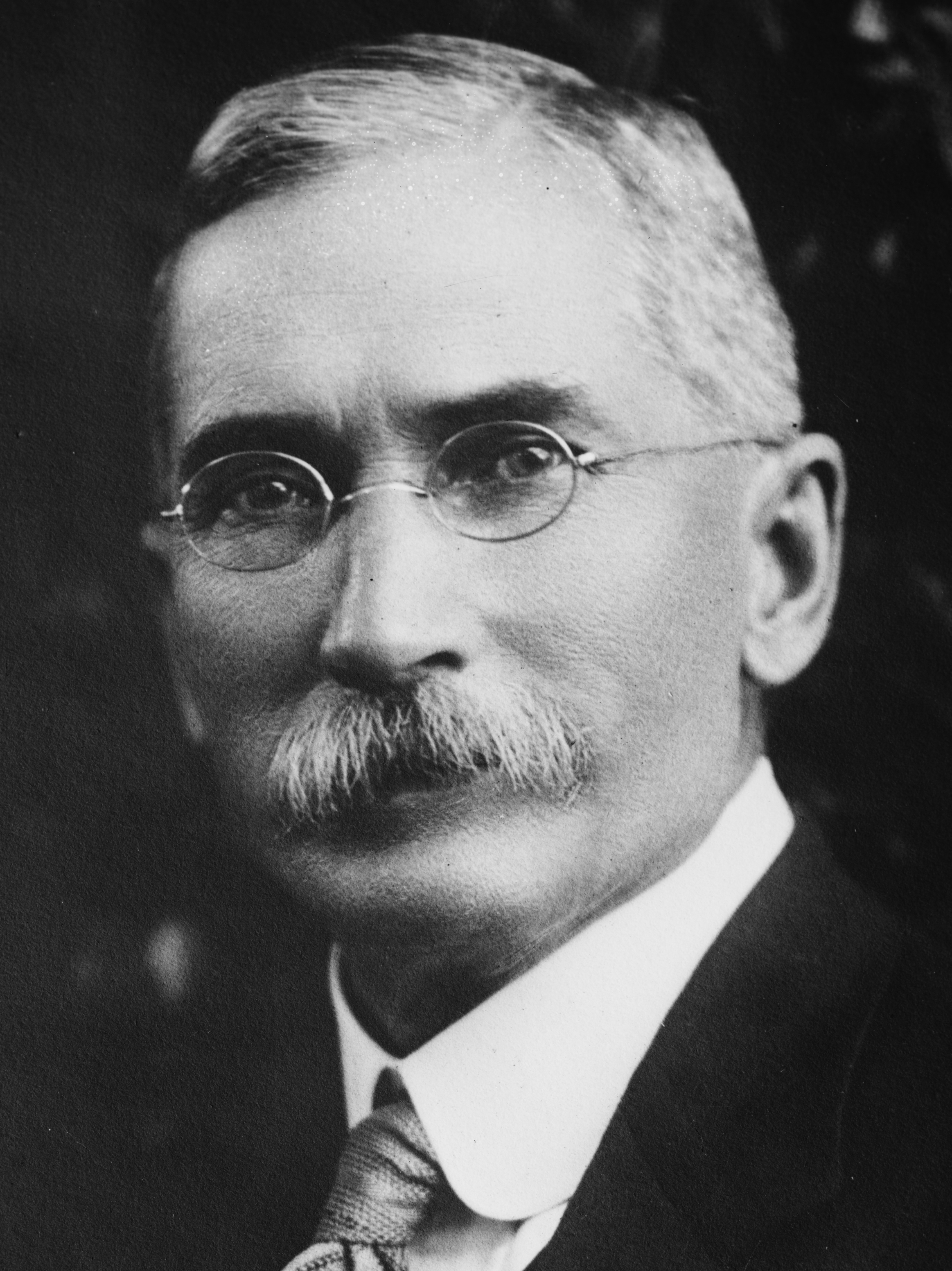

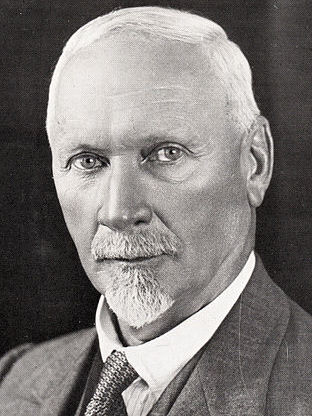

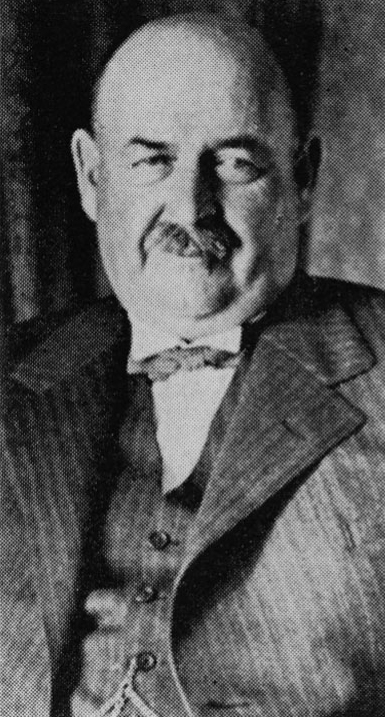

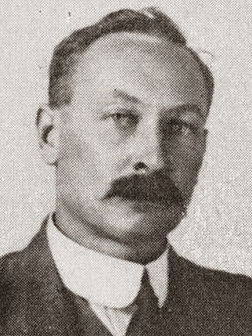
	First party	Second party
Leader	J. B. M. Hertzog	Jan Smuts
Party	National	South African
Leader's seat	Smithfield	Standerton
Last election	41.17%, 78 seats	46.50%, 61 seats
Seats won	75	61
Seat change	▼3	Steady
Popular vote	101,159	71,486
Percentage	31.61%	22.34%
Swing	▼9.55pp	▼24.16pp
	Third party	Fourth party
Leader	Tielman Roos	Walter Madeley
Party	Roos	Labour
Leader's seat	stood in Rustenburg	Benoni
Last election	Did not exist	9.86%, 8 seats
Seats won	2	2
Seat change	New party	▼6
Popular vote	27,441	20,276
Percentage	8.58%	6.34%
Swing	New party	▼3.52pp
- Results by province
Prime Minister before election
J. B. M. Hertzog
National
Elected Prime Minister
J. B. M. Hertzog
National

General elections were held in South Africa on 17 May 1933 to elect the 150 members of the House of Assembly. The National Party won half the seats in the House, but the coalition with the South African Party continued.

== Changes to the franchise ==
Since the 1929 election several changes had been made to the franchise laws. Adult white women were enfranchised in 1930. In 1931 all European males over the age of 21 were enfranchised (eliminating property and wage qualifications for that section of the population).

One effect of these changes, which were not extended to the non-white population of the Union, was to dilute the influence of the non-white electors in Cape Province and Natal.

== Delimitation of electoral divisions ==
The South Africa Act 1909 had provided for a delimitation commission to define the boundaries for each electoral division. The representation by province, under the sixth delimitation report of 1932, is set out in the table below. The figures in brackets are the number of electoral divisions in the previous (1928) delimitation. If there is no figure in brackets then the number was unchanged.

Provinces	Cape	Natal	Orange Free State	Transvaal	Total
Divisions	61 (58)	16 (17)	16 (18)	57 (55)	150 (148)

== Results ==
The vote totals in the table below may not give a complete picture of the balance of political opinion, because of unopposed elections (where no votes were cast) and because contested seats may not have been fought by a candidate from all major parties.

As the two largest parties were in coalition together, the opposition to the government was weaker and more fragmented than in any other election in South African history.

Party	Votes	%	Seats	+/–
National Party	101,159	31.61	75	–3
South African Party	71,486	22.34	61	0
Roos Party	27,441	8.58	2	New
Labour Party	20,276	6.34	2	–6
Natal Home Rule Party	12,328	3.85	0	New
Independents	87,321	27.29	10	+9
Total	320,011	100.00	150	+2
Valid votes	320,011	98.95		
Invalid/blank votes	3,406	1.05		
Total votes	323,417	100.00		
Registered voters/turnout	957,636	33.77		
Source: South Africa 1982

An alternative breakdown of members, distinguishing between supporters and opponents of the coalition, was (pro Coalition) NP 75, SAP 61, Creswell Labour 2, Roos 2; (opposition) National Council Labour 2, Natal Home Rule 2, Independents 6. Another interpretation is NP 75, SAP 61, Labour 4, Roos Party 2, Home Rule group 2 and Independents 6.
