= Results of the 1929 South African general election =

- 12 June 1929

All 148 seats in the House of Assembly 75 seats needed for a majority
- Registered: 461,820
- Turnout: 75.34% (▼1.89pp)
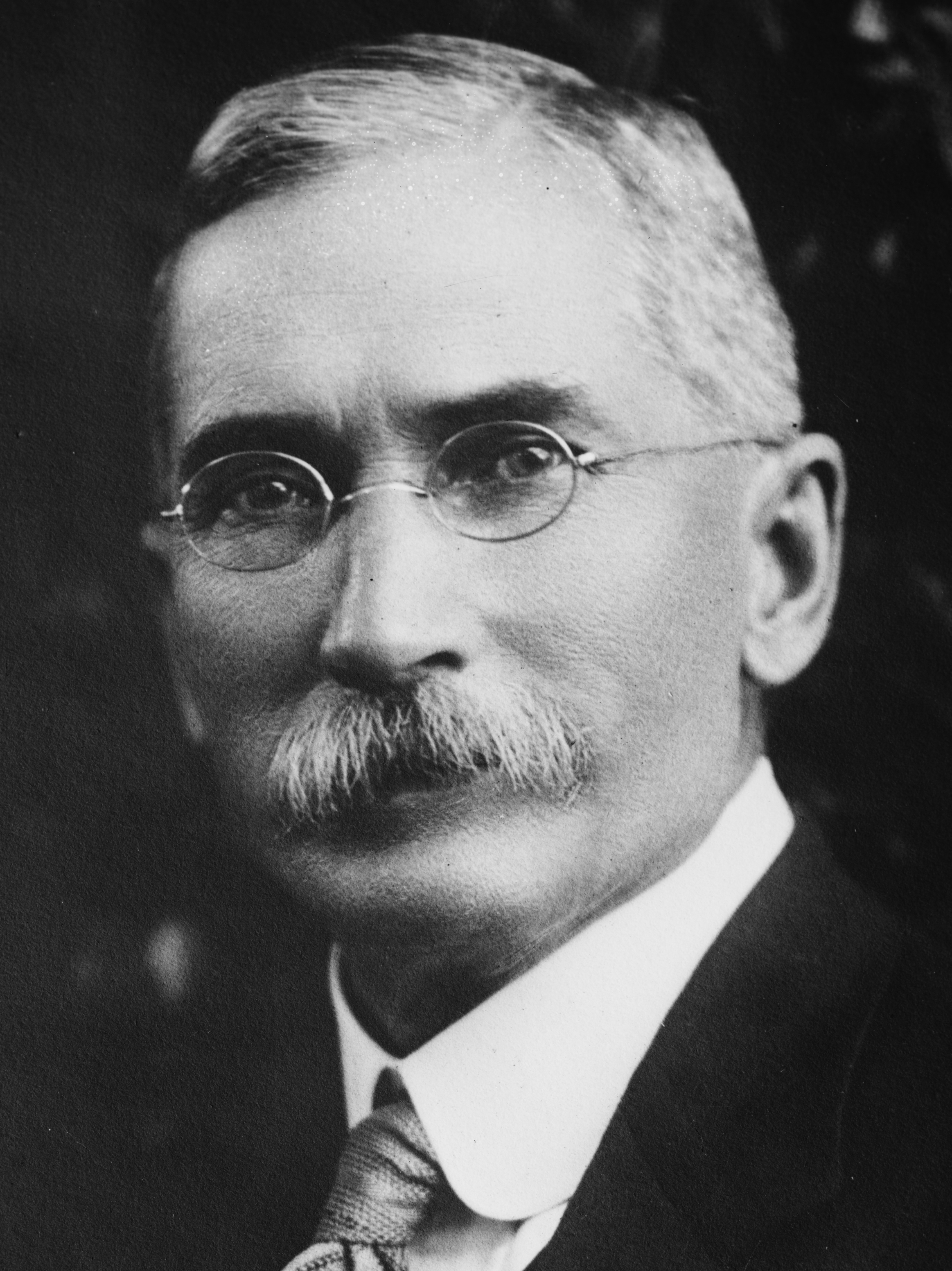

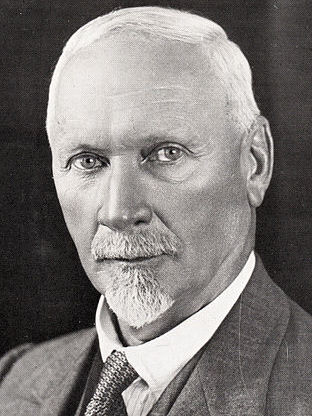
	First party	Second party	Third party
			Lab
Leader	J. B. M. Hertzog	Jan Smuts	Disputed
Party	National	South African	Labour
Leader's seat	Smithfield	Standerton
Last election	35.25%, 63 seats	47.04%, 53 seats	14.35%, 18 seats
Seats won	78	61	8
Seat change	▲15	▲8	▼10
Popular vote	141,579	159,896	33,919
Percentage	41.17%	46.50%	9.86%
Swing	▲5.92pp	▼0.54pp	▼4.49pp
- Results by province
Prime Minister before election
J. B. M. Hertzog
National
Elected Prime Minister
J. B. M. Hertzog
National

This is a list of constituency results for the 1929 South African general election.

== Boundary changes ==
The Fifth Delimitation Commission (1928) expanded the House of Assembly from 135 to 148 seats, the largest expansion in the history of the House. All provinces except Natal gained at least one seat in the redistribution, but all four provinces saw significant changes to their constituencies.

Province	Seats 1924	Created	Abolished	Seats 1929
Cape of Good Hope	51	Bredasdorp; Cape Flats; Cape Town Castle; Cathcart; Hottentots Holland; Kuruman; Mowbray; Port Elizabeth North; Prieska; Sea Point; Willowmore; Woodstock; Wynberg	Barkly; Cape Town Hanover Street; Cape Town Harbour; Liesbeek; Rondebosch; Three Rivers	58
Natal	17	Durban District; Durban Umlazi; Pietermaritzburg District	Durban Central; Pietermaritzburg South; Umvoti	17
Orange Free State	17	Lindley; Senekal; Smithfield-Rouxville	Ficksburg; Smithfield	18
Transvaal	50	Brits; Carolina; Gezina; Magaliesberg; Potgietersrus; Pretoria District; Swartruggens; Vereeniging	Pretoria District North; Pretoria District South; Witwatersberg	55

== Cape Province ==
Party	Votes	%	Seats
South African Party	78,382	49.47	31
National Party	60,850	38.41	26
Labour Party (Creswell)	9,152	5.78	0
Labour Party (National Council)	877	0.55	0
Communist Party	289	0.18	0
Independent South African Party	2,010	1.27	0
Independents	6,871	4.34	1
Total	158,431	100.00	58
Source: Schoeman

Unopposed candidates: SAP 4.

=== Albany ===
General election 1929: Albany
Party	Candidate	Votes	%	±%
South African	R. H. Struben	Unopposed		
South African hold				

=== Albert ===
General election 1929: Albert
Party	Candidate	Votes	%	±%
National	L. J. Steytler	1,890	67.3	+5.2
South African	P. E. Scholtz	893	31.7	−5.6
Rejected ballots		27	1.0	+0.4
Majority		997	35.6	+10.8
Turnout		2,810	85.5	+0.6
National hold		Swing	+5.4	

=== Aliwal ===
General election 1929: Aliwal
Party	Candidate	Votes	%	±%
South African	C. A. A. Sephton	1,518	51.3	−1.2
National	H. McKinnell	1,367	46.3	−0.3
Rejected ballots		69	2.4	+1.5
Majority		151	5.0	−0.9
Turnout		2,954	85.9	−0.2
South African hold		Swing	-0.5	

=== Beaconsfield ===
General election 1929: Beaconsfield
Party	Candidate	Votes	%	±%
South African	W. B. Humphreys	1,812	54.0	−8.6
National	S. Zwelback	1,524	45.5	+8.8
Rejected ballots		17	0.5	-0.2
Majority		288	8.5	−0.1
Turnout		3,353	85.5	+3.9
South African hold		Swing	-0.1	

=== Beaufort West ===
General election 1929: Beaufort West
Party	Candidate	Votes	%	±%
National	P. N. Basson	1,590	65.5	+3.8
Independent	K. D. Haak	802	33.0	New
Rejected ballots		35	1.5	N/A
Majority		93	33.0	N/A
Turnout		2,427	79.6	−4.7
National hold		Swing	N/A	

=== Bechuanaland ===
General election 1929: Bechuanaland
Party	Candidate	Votes	%	±%
National	I. van Wijk Raubenheimer	1,665	53.7	+0.5
South African	P. A. Fraenkel	1,378	44.4	New
Rejected ballots		58	1.9	N/A
Majority		287	9.3	N/A
Turnout		3,101	84.0	+2.4
National hold		Swing	N/A	

=== Bredasdorp ===
General election 1929: Bredasdorp
Party	Candidate	Votes	%	±%
South African	P. V. van der Byl	1,776	59.5	New
National	A. J. de Waal	1,175	39.3	New
Rejected ballots		35	1.2	N/A
Majority		601	20.2	N/A
Turnout		2,986	90.1	N/A
South African win (new seat)				

=== Caledon ===
General election 1929: Caledon
Party	Candidate	Votes	%	±%
South African	Joel Krige	1,741	52.1	−6.6
National	M. G. Viljoen	1,564	46.8	+6.6
Rejected ballots		35	0.9	+-0
Majority		177	5.3	−13.0
Turnout		3,340	91.3	+3.9
South African hold		Swing	-6.5	

=== Calvinia ===
General election 1929: Calvinia
Party	Candidate	Votes	%	±%
National	D. F. Malan	1,502	66.9	+6.4
Independent	H. J. Nel	706	31.4	New
Rejected ballots		38	1.7	+1.0
Majority		796	35.5	N/A
Turnout		2,246	75.6	+3.6
National hold		Swing	N/A	

=== Cape Flats ===
General election 1929: Cape Flats
Party	Candidate	Votes	%	±%
South African	A. J. Chiappini	1,719	54.9	New
National	W. McGregor	1,186	37.8	New
Independent	D. G. Wolton	93	3.0	New
Independent	P. J. Wolmarans	84	2.7	New
Rejected ballots		52	1.7	N/A
Majority		533	17.1	N/A
Turnout		3,134	75.6	N/A
South African win (new seat)				

=== Cape Town Castle ===
General election 1929: Cape Town Castle
Party	Candidate	Votes	%	±%
South African	A. J. MacCallum	1,795	61.0	+14.6
Independent	J. Frank	1,054	35.8	New
Rejected ballots		93	3.2	+0.7
Majority		741	25.2	N/A
Turnout		2,942	71.6	+5.6
South African gain from Constitutional Democrat		Swing	N/A	

=== Cape Town Central ===
General election 1929: Cape Town Central
Party	Candidate	Votes	%	±%
South African	R. W. Bowen	2,057	67.9	−3.2
Labour (Creswell)	Robert Forsyth	925	30.5	New
Rejected ballots		47	1.6	+0.9
Majority		1,132	37.4	N/A
Turnout		3,029	71.0	+2.6
South African hold		Swing	N/A	

=== Cape Town Gardens ===
General election 1929: Cape Town Gardens
Party	Candidate	Votes	%	±%
South African	C. W. A. Coulter	1,726	51.7	+0.6
Labour (Creswell)	Morris Alexander	1,582	47.4	−0.1
Rejected ballots		32	0.9	-0.5
Majority		144	4.3	+0.7
Turnout		3,340	82.9	+7.3
South African hold		Swing	+0.4	

=== Cathcart ===
General election 1929: Cathcart
Party	Candidate	Votes	%	±%
South African	C. M. van Coller	1,562	64.9	New
Independent	A. F. Lyon	802	33.3	New
Rejected ballots		44	1.8	N/A
Majority		760	31.6	N/A
Turnout		2,408	74.1	N/A
South African win (new seat)				

=== Ceres ===
General election 1929: Ceres
Party	Candidate	Votes	%	±%
National	J. W. J. W. Roux	1,620	57.5	+4.7
South African	E. H. Nellmapius	1,179	41.8	−4.4
Rejected ballots		20	0.7	-0.3
Majority		441	15.7	+9.1
Turnout		2,819	87.3	+0.4
National hold		Swing	+4.6	

=== Colesberg ===
General election 1929: Colesberg
Party	Candidate	Votes	%	±%
National	H. A. Lamprecht	1,731	54.6	+6.6
South African	G. A. Louw	1,415	44.7	−6.6
Rejected ballots		22	0.7	+-0
Majority		316	9.9	N/A
Turnout		3,168	87.6	+1.7
National gain from South African		Swing	+6.6	

=== Cradock ===
General election 1929: Cradock
Party	Candidate	Votes	%	±%
National	J. F. van G. Bekker	1,784	58.5	+9.3
South African	P. J. J. Coetzee	1,244	40.9	−9.6
Rejected ballots		20	0.6	+0.3
Majority		540	16.6	N/A
Turnout		3,048	86.7	−3.1
National gain from South African		Swing	+9.4	

=== East London City ===
General election 1929: East London City
Party	Candidate	Votes	%	±%
South African	J. A. Bowie	1,785	54.2	+3.7
Labour (Creswell)	James Stewart	1,476	44.9	−2.6
Rejected ballots		30	0.9	-1.1
Majority		309	9.3	+6.3
Turnout		3,291	80.5	−7.0
South African hold		Swing	+3.2	

=== East London North ===
General election 1929: East London North
Party	Candidate	Votes	%	±%
South African	J. J. Byron	1,839	60.8	+2.1
National	H. G. J. van Rensburg	1,131	37.4	New
Rejected ballots		53	1.8	+0.5
Majority		708	23.4	N/A
Turnout		3,023	79.3	−0.9
South African hold		Swing	N/A	

=== Fort Beaufort ===
General election 1929: Fort Beaufort
Party	Candidate	Votes	%	±%
South African	R. A. Hockley	1,510	55.6	+3.0
Independent	H. Sinclair	1,186	43.7	−2.6
Rejected ballots		20	0.7	-0.4
Majority		324	11.9	+5.6
Turnout		2,716	79.7	−0.2
South African hold		Swing	+2.8	

=== George ===
General election 1929: George
Party	Candidate	Votes	%	±%
National	G. F. Brink	1,920	65.7	+12.4
South African	T. G. Truter	970	33.2	−12.1
Rejected ballots		31	1.1	+0.2
Majority		950	32.5	+24.0
Turnout		2,921	82.4	−3.0
National hold		Swing	+12.0	

=== Gordonia ===
General election 1929: Gordonia
Party	Candidate	Votes	%	±%
National	J. H. Conradie	1,537	56.2	+0.5
South African	P. J. van der Westhuizen	1,152	42.1	−1.5
Rejected ballots		45	1.7	+1.0
Majority		385	14.1	+2.0
Turnout		2,734	82.2	−2.6
National hold		Swing	+1.0	

=== Graaff-Reinet ===
Polling in Graaff-Reinet was postponed until 15 July.

General election 1929: Graaff-Reinet
Party	Candidate	Votes	%	±%
National	Karl Bremer	1,586	59.9	−2.6
South African	H. Urquhart	1,036	39.1	+2.2
Rejected ballots		26	1.0	+0.4
Majority		550	20.8	−4.8
Turnout		2,648	80.9	−0.1
National hold		Swing	-2.4	

=== Griqualand ===
General election 1929: Griqualand
Party	Candidate	Votes	%	±%
South African	L. D. Gilson	1,839	77.2	+23.3
National	M. M. Heyns	507	21.3	New
Rejected ballots		37	1.5	+0.5
Majority		1,332	55.9	N/A
Turnout		2,383	73.6	+13.6
South African hold		Swing	N/A	

=== Hopetown ===
General election 1929: Hopetown
Party	Candidate	Votes	%	±%
National	A. J. Stals	1,601	54.2	+3.1
South African	C. P. Matthewson	1,323	44.8	−3.3
Rejected ballots		29	1.0	+0.2
Majority		278	9.4	+6.4
Turnout		2,953	88.1	+1.2
National hold		Swing	+3.2	

=== Hottentots Holland ===
General election 1929: Hottentots Holland
Party	Candidate	Votes	%	±%
South African	P. A. B. Faure	1,900	53.8	New
National	Henry Allan Fagan	1,573	44.5	New
Rejected ballots		60	1.7	N/A
Majority		327	9.3	N/A
Turnout		3,533	82.1	N/A
South African win (new seat)				

=== Humansdorp ===
General election 1929: Humansdorp
Party	Candidate	Votes	%	±%
National	Charl W. Malan	1,788	54.1	−5.0
South African	J. P. du Plessis	1,444	43.7	+3.5
Rejected ballots		71	2.2	+1.5
Majority		344	10.4	−8.5
Turnout		3,303	91.0	+5.1
National hold		Swing	-4.3	

=== Kimberley ===
General election 1929: Kimberley
Party	Candidate	Votes	%	±%
South African	Ernest Oppenheimer	2,044	63.1	−4.3
National	A. M. M. Hartmann	1,132	34.9	New
Independent	J. Willis	9	0.3	New
Rejected ballots		55	1.7	+0.5
Majority		912	28.2	N/A
Turnout		3,240	83.6	+2.9
South African hold		Swing	N/A	

=== King William's Town ===
General election 1929: King William's Town
Party	Candidate	Votes	%	±%
South African	A. C. V. Baines	1,663	54.3	+2.3
Ind. South African	C. H. Malcomess	1,076	35.1	−10.7
Independent	A. H. King	293	9.6	New
Rejected ballots		33	1.0	-1.2
Majority		587	19.2	+13.0
Turnout		3,065	80.3	+4.8
South African hold		Swing	+6.5	

=== Kuruman ===
General election 1929: Kuruman
Party	Candidate	Votes	%	±%
National	W. B. de Villiers	1,677	53.0	New
South African	G. M. H. Barrell	1,353	42.8	New
Rejected ballots		133	4.2	N/A
Majority		324	10.2	N/A
Turnout		3,163	89.0	N/A
National win (new seat)				

=== Ladismith ===
General election 1929: Ladismith
Party	Candidate	Votes	%	±%
National	J. J. M. van Zyl	1,558	62.7	+11.3
South African	N. J. Hofmeyr	858	34.5	−13.6
Rejected ballots		68	2.8	+2.3
Majority		700	28.2	+24.9
Turnout		2,484	82.0	−9.6
National gain from South African		Swing	+12.5	

=== Malmesbury ===
General election 1929: Malmesbury
Party	Candidate	Votes	%	±%
National	P. A. Bergh	1,721	51.9	−0.1
South African	F. S. Malan	1,561	47.1	+0.2
Rejected ballots		34	1.0	-0.1
Majority		160	4.8	−0.3
Turnout		3,316	91.7	+0.5
National hold		Swing	-0.2	

=== Mowbray ===
General election 1929: Mowbray
Party	Candidate	Votes	%	±%
South African	R. W. Close	1,933	63.7	New
Labour (Creswell)	J. Lomax	1,021	33.7	New
Labour (N.C.)	J. A. Cunningham	69	2.3	New
Rejected ballots		10	0.3	N/A
Majority		908	30.0	N/A
Turnout		3,033	76.3	N/A
South African win (new seat)				

=== Namaqualand ===
General election 1929: Namaqualand
Party	Candidate	Votes	%	±%
Independent	W. P. Steenkamp	1,258	57.6	New
National	J. P. Mostert	502	23.0	−44.0
Independent	A. M. Roux	391	17.9	New
Independent	W. P. Thorn	8	0.4	New
Rejected ballots		24	1.1	-0.6
Majority		756	34.6	N/A
Turnout		2,183	61.0	−6.3
Independent gain from National		Swing	N/A	

=== Newlands ===
General election 1929: Newlands
Party	Candidate	Votes	%	±%
South African	Richard Stuttaford	Unopposed		
South African hold				

=== Oudtshoorn ===
General election 1929: Oudtshoorn
Party	Candidate	Votes	%	±%
National	S. P. le Roux	1,805	60.3	+0.8
South African	P. A. H. Melville	1,150	38.4	−1.3
Rejected ballots		40	1.3	+0.5
Majority		655	21.9	+2.1
Turnout		2,995	85.9	+0.5
National hold		Swing	+1.1	

=== Paarl ===
General election 1929: Paarl
Party	Candidate	Votes	%	±%
National	P. P. du Toit	1,829	50.3	+3.3
South African	F. A. Joubert	1,764	48.6	−3.5
Rejected ballots		38	1.1	+0.2
Majority		65	1.7	N/A
Turnout		3,631	91.4	+7.4
National gain from South African		Swing	+3.4	

=== Piketberg ===
General election 1929: Piketberg
Party	Candidate	Votes	%	±%
National	J. H. H. de Waal	1,894	60.8	+1.2
South African	F. T. Versfeld	1,148	36.9	−2.6
Rejected ballots		71	2.3	+1.4
Majority		746	23.9	+3.8
Turnout		3,113	86.5	+3.7
National hold		Swing	+1.9	

=== Port Elizabeth Central ===
General election 1929: Port Elizabeth Central
Party	Candidate	Votes	%	±%
South African	A. P. J. Wares	2,002	64.4	−6.5
Labour (Creswell)	M. Lazarus	1,069	34.4	+6.9
Rejected ballots		39	1.2	-0.4
Majority		933	30.0	−13.4
Turnout		3,110	72.5	−4.9
South African hold		Swing	-6.7	

=== Port Elizabeth North ===
General election 1929: Port Elizabeth North
Party	Candidate	Votes	%	±%
South African	C. F. Kayser	Unopposed		
South African win (new seat)				

=== Port Elizabeth South ===
General election 1929: Port Elizabeth South
Party	Candidate	Votes	%	±%
South African	William Macintosh	2,246	76.8	+5.8
Labour (Creswell)	E. J. Jordan	609	20.8	−4.8
Rejected ballots		71	2.4	-1.0
Majority		1,637	56.0	+10.6
Turnout		2,926	72.0	−8.0
South African hold		Swing	+5.3	

=== Prieska ===
General election 1929: Prieska
Party	Candidate	Votes	%	±%
National	C. H. Geldenhuys	1,352	60.6	New
South African	J. P. Coetzee	863	38.7	New
Rejected ballots		17	0.7	N/A
Majority		489	21.9	N/A
Turnout		2,232	75.1	N/A
National win (new seat)				

=== Queenstown ===
General election 1929: Queenstown
Party	Candidate	Votes	%	±%
South African	W. F. de Wet	1,932	62.9	N/A
National	T. P. N. Coetsee	1,100	35.8	New
Rejected ballots		39	1.3	N/A
Majority		832	27.1	N/A
Turnout		3,071	83.2	N/A
South African hold		Swing	N/A	

=== Riversdale ===
General election 1929: Riversdale
Party	Candidate	Votes	%	±%
National	A. L. Badenhorst	1,769	54.1	−2.6
South African	G. R. Hofmeyr	1,446	44.3	+1.5
Rejected ballots		53	1.4	+0.9
Majority		323	9.8	−4.1
Turnout		3,268	91.9	+2.1
National hold		Swing	-2.1	

=== Salt River ===
General election 1929: Salt River
Party	Candidate	Votes	%	±%
South African	Harry Lawrence	1,561	50.2	+17.6
Labour (Creswell)	W. J. Snow	1,370	44.1	−22.3
Labour (N.C.)	G. Pearce	154	5.0	New
Rejected ballots		23	0.7	-0.2
Majority		1,013	33.8	N/A
Turnout		3,108	74.6	+13.6
South African gain from Labour		Swing	+20.0	

=== Sea Point ===
General election 1929: Sea Point
Party	Candidate	Votes	%	±%
South African	Gideon Brand van Zyl	Unopposed		
South African win (new seat)				

=== Somerset ===
General election 1929: Somerset
Party	Candidate	Votes	%	±%
National	L. J. Vosloo	1,617	61.0	+0.4
South African	A. B. Hobson	1,008	38.0	−0.8
Rejected ballots		25	1.0	+0.4
Majority		609	23.0	+1.2
Turnout		2,650	82.5	−0.2
National hold		Swing	+0.6	

=== South Peninsula ===
General election 1929: South Peninsula
Party	Candidate	Votes	%	±%
South African	Sidney Frank Waterson	2,073	70.6	+10.0
National	W. H. Lategan	820	27.9	−9.9
Rejected ballots		44	1.6	-0.1
Majority		1,253	42.7	+19.9
Turnout		2,937	74.8	+9.9
South African hold		Swing	+10.0	

=== Stellenbosch ===
General election 1929: Stellenbosch
Party	Candidate	Votes	%	±%
National	W. B. de Villiers	2,013	52.7	+9.3
South African	J. P. Louw	1,745	45.7	−9.8
Rejected ballots		64	1.6	+0.5
Majority		268	7.0	N/A
Turnout		3,822	89.1	+2.2
National gain from South African		Swing	+9.6	

=== Swellendam ===
General election 1929: Swellendam
Party	Candidate	Votes	%	±%
National	G. van Z. Wolfaard	1,806	55.7	+11.7
South African	G. J. Rossouw	1,406	43.4	−11.9
Rejected ballots		30	0.9	+0.2
Majority		400	12.3	N/A
Turnout		3,242	91.6	+3.1
National gain from South African		Swing	+11.8	

=== Tembuland ===
General election 1929: Tembuland
Party	Candidate	Votes	%	±%
South African	A. O. B. Payn	1,079	46.2	−4.6
Ind. South African	G. K. Hemming	934	40.0	New
South African Communist Party	S. P. Bunting	289	12.4	New
Rejected ballots		34	1.4	+0.6
Majority		145	6.2	N/A
Turnout		2,336	68.9	−5.3
South African hold		Swing	N/A	

=== Uitenhage ===
General election 1929: Uitenhage
Party	Candidate	Votes	%	±%
South African	F. T. Bates	1,966	56.4	+5.2
National	P. J. Olivier	1,460	41.9	−5.6
Rejected ballots		62	1.7	+0.4
Majority		506	13.5	+10.8
Turnout		3,488	87.3	−2.0
South African hold		Swing	+5.4	

=== Victoria West ===
General election 1929: Victoria West
Party	Candidate	Votes	%	±%
National	Paul Sauer	1,453	51.0	−1.7
South African	A. M. Conroy	1,366	48.0	+1.3
Rejected ballots		30	1.0	+0.4
Majority		202	3.0	−3.0
Turnout		2,849	87.4	−5.0
National hold		Swing	-1.5	

=== Willowmore ===
General election 1929: Willowmore
Party	Candidate	Votes	%	±%
National	G. P. Steyn	1,759	63.8	New
South African	J. A. L. de Waal	918	33.3	New
Rejected ballots		80	2.9	N/A
Majority		841	30.5	N/A
Turnout		2,757	86.7	N/A
National win (new seat)				

=== Wodehouse ===
General election 1929: Wodehouse
Party	Candidate	Votes	%	±%
National	O. S. Vermooten	1,744	55.1	+1.9
South African	J. A. Venter	1,368	43.2	−3.1
Rejected ballots		52	1.7	+1.2
Majority		376	11.9	+5.0
Turnout		3,164	89.1	+1.4
National hold		Swing	+2.5	

=== Woodstock ===
General election 1929: Woodstock
Party	Candidate	Votes	%	±%
South African	Eli Buirski	1,692	59.3	New
Labour (Creswell)	W. Freestone	1,100	38.6	New
Labour (N.C.)	A. G. Forsyth	30	1.1	New
Rejected ballots		31	1.0	N/A
Majority		592	20.7	N/A
Turnout		2,853	72.6	N/A
South African win (new seat)				

=== Worcester ===
General election 1929: Worcester
Party	Candidate	Votes	%	±%
South African	C. B. Heatlie	1,719	51.3	−1.0
National	J. H. Conradie	1,599	47.7	+0.7
Rejected ballots		32	1.1	+0.3
Majority		120	3.6	−1.7
Turnout		3,350	90.3	−0.6
South African hold		Swing	-0.9	

=== Wynberg ===
General election 1929: Wynberg
Party	Candidate	Votes	%	±%
South African	E. R. Roper	1,905	69.4	New
Labour (N.C.)	W. A. Costello	624	22.7	New
Independent	L. Lewe	185	6.7	New
Rejected ballots		33	1.2	N/A
Majority		1,281	46.7	N/A
Turnout		2,747	70.7	N/A
South African win (new seat)				

== Natal ==
Party	Votes	%	Seats
South African Party	14,789	58.06	16
National Party	4,610	18.10	1
Labour Party (National Council)	2,806	11.02	0
Labour Party (Creswell)	2,331	9.15	0
Ind. South African	938	3.68	0
Total	25,474	100.00	17
Source: Schoeman

Unopposed candidates: SAP 5.

=== Dundee ===
General election 1929: Dundee
Party	Candidate	Votes	%	±%
South African	G. A. Friend	1,024	59.4	+6.5
National	J. J. Kemp	689	39.8	−7.3
Rejected ballots		11	0.8	+0.8
Majority		335	19.6	+13.8
Turnout		1,724	78.6	+6.3
South African hold		Swing	+6.9	

=== Durban Berea ===
General election 1929: Durban Berea
Party	Candidate	Votes	%	±%
South African	John Williamson	1,047	52.6	−18.7
Ind. South African	J. T. Oliff	938	47.1	New
Rejected ballots		7	0.3	+0.1
Majority		109	5.5	N/A
Turnout		1,992	70.7	−10.7
South African hold		Swing	N/A	

=== Durban District ===
General election 1929: Durban District
Party	Candidate	Votes	%	±%
South African	A. H. J. Eaton	1,383	70.2	New
Labour (Creswell)	Frank Nettleton	403	20.5	New
Labour (National Council)	B. W. Matthews	172	8.7	New
Rejected ballots		11	0.6	N/A
Majority		980	39.7	N/A
Turnout		1,969	74.3	N/A
South African win (new seat)				

=== Durban Greyville ===
General election 1929: Durban Greyville
Party	Candidate	Votes	%	±%
South African	G. R. Richards	1,408	54.0	+20.0
Labour (Creswell)	Tommy Boydell	1,053	40.4	−25.2
Labour (National Council)	J. Trembath	117	4.5	New
Rejected ballots		30	1.1	+0.7
Majority		355	13.6	N/A
Turnout		2,608	84.4	−0.4
South African gain from Labour		Swing	+22.6	

=== Durban Point ===
General election 1929: Durban Point
Party	Candidate	Votes	%	±%
South African	V. L. Nicoll	1,719	67.8	+24.3
Labour (N.C.)	W. Wanless	786	31.1	+0.2
Rejected ballots		24	0.9	+0.7
Majority		933	34.7	+22.1
Turnout		2,529	73.4	−6.7
South African hold		Swing	+11.1	

=== Durban Stamford Hill ===
General election 1929: Durban Stamford Hill
Party	Candidate	Votes	%	±%
South African	F. J. Lennox	Unopposed		
South African hold				

=== Durban Umbilo ===
General election 1929: Durban Umbilo
Party	Candidate	Votes	%	±%
South African	H. P. Borlase	1,429	61.4	+13.0
Labour (N.C.)	George Reyburn	884	38.0	−12.9
Rejected ballots		13	0.6	-0.1
Majority		545	23.4	N/A
Turnout		2,326	75.5	−10.3
South African gain from Labour		Swing	+13.0	

=== Durban Umlazi ===
General election 1929: Durban Umlazi
Party	Candidate	Votes	%	±%
South African	F. H. Acutt	1,354	63.0	New
Labour (N.C.)	A. Lamont	782	36.4	New
Rejected ballots		15	0.6	N/A
Majority		572	26.6	N/A
Turnout		2,151	81.7	N/A
South African win (new seat)				

=== Illovo ===
General election 1929: Illovo
Party	Candidate	Votes	%	±%
South African	J. S. Marwick	Unopposed		
South African hold				

=== Klip River ===
General election 1929: Klip River
Party	Candidate	Votes	%	±%
South African	H. E. K. Anderson	1,101	55.4	+3.4
National	W. P. Gray	871	43.9	−3.4
Rejected ballots		14	0.7	N/A
Majority		140	11.5	+6.8
Turnout		1,986	80.0	+3.0
South African hold		Swing	+3.4	

=== Natal Coast ===
General election 1929: Natal Coast
Party	Candidate	Votes	%	±%
South African	William Arnott	Unopposed		
South African hold				

=== Newcastle ===
General election 1929: Newcastle
Party	Candidate	Votes	%	±%
South African	O. R. Nel	1,011	50.7	−1.3
National	A. J. Potgieter	974	48.8	+1.2
Rejected ballots		10	0.5	+0.1
Majority		66	1.9	−2.5
Turnout		1,995	88.5	+6.3
South African hold		Swing	-1.3	

=== Pietermaritzburg District ===
General election 1929: Pietermaritzburg District
Party	Candidate	Votes	%	±%
South African	W. J. O'Brien	Unopposed		
South African win (new seat)				

=== Pietermaritzburg North ===
General election 1929: Pietermaritzburg North
Party	Candidate	Votes	%	±%
South African	W. A. Deane	1,456	90.0	+47.3
Labour (Creswell)	T. G. Strachan	85	5.3	−51.6
Labour (N.C.)	N. P. Palmer	65	4.0	New
Rejected ballots		12	0.7	+0.3
Majority		1,371	84.7	N/A
Turnout		1,618	55.9	−28.9
South African gain from Labour		Swing	+49.5	

=== Vryheid ===
General election 1929: Vryheid
Party	Candidate	Votes	%	±%
National	Ernest George Jansen	1,157	58.0	+3.5
South African	P. J. Wessels	826	41.4	−3.5
Rejected ballots		12	0.6	N/A
Majority		331	16.6	+7.0
Turnout		1,995	84.1	−1.9
National hold		Swing	+3.5	

=== Weenen ===
General election 1929: Weenen
Party	Candidate	Votes	%	±%
South African	Harold Abrahamson	1,031	52.5	−17.2
National	J. J. Boshof	919	46.8	New
Rejected ballots		15	0.7	-0.1
Majority		112	5.7	N/A
Turnout		1,965	84.1	+10.4
South African hold		Swing	N/A	

=== Zululand ===
General election 1929: Zululand
Party	Candidate	Votes	%	±%
South African	George Heaton Nicholls	Unopposed		
South African hold				

== Orange Free State ==
Party	Votes	%	Seats
National Party	26,231	70.65	17
South African Party	9,073	24.44	0
Labour Party (Creswell)	1,380	3.72	1
Labour Party (National Council)	443	1.19	0
Total	37,127	100.00	18
Source: Schoeman

=== Bethlehem ===
General election 1929: Bethlehem
Party	Candidate	Votes	%	±%
National	R. A. T. van der Merwe	1,469	77.0	+3.2
South African	P. J. Botha	419	22.0	−2.8
Rejected ballots		21	1.0	-0.4
Majority		1,050	55.0	+6.0
Turnout		1,909	71.8	−0.3
National hold		Swing	+3.0	

=== Bloemfontein North ===
General election 1929: Bloemfontein North
Party	Candidate	Votes	%	±%
Labour (Creswell)	Fred Shaw	1,380	52.1	New
South African	C. J. H. Reitz	894	33.8	−7.0
Labour (N.C.)	Arthur Barlow	1,436	12.8	−46.0
Rejected ballots		33	1.3	+0.9
Majority		486	18.3	N/A
Turnout		2,647	83.2	+7.1
Labour gain from Labour		Swing	N/A	

=== Bloemfontein South ===
General election 1929: Bloemfontein South
Party	Candidate	Votes	%	±%
National	J. J. Haywood	1,786	67.1	+3.5
South African	P. J. van B. Faure	755	28.4	−7.7
Labour (N.C.)	H. W. Berger	103	3.9	New
Rejected ballots		16	0.6	+0.3
Majority		1,031	38.7	+11.2
Turnout		2,660	81.6	+0.7
National hold		Swing	+5.6	

=== Boshof ===
General election 1929: Boshof
Party	Candidate	Votes	%	±%
National	J. J. van Rensburg	1,812	89.2	N/A
South African	B. Kasselman	192	9.5	New
Rejected ballots		27	1.3	N/A
Majority		1,620	79.7	N/A
Turnout		2,031	76.0	N/A
National hold		Swing	N/A	

=== Edenburg ===
General election 1929: Edenburg
Party	Candidate	Votes	%	±%
National	Fredrik William Beyers	1,638	81.1	+3.7
South African	A. J. Griesel	355	17.6	−3.2
Rejected ballots		26	1.3	-0.5
Majority		1,283	63.5	+6.9
Turnout		2,019	76.5	−0.6
National hold		Swing	+3.5	

=== Fauresmith ===
General election 1929: Fauresmith
Party	Candidate	Votes	%	±%
National	Nicolaas Havenga	1,692	82.9	N/A
South African	N. F. van der Merwe	330	16.2	New
Rejected ballots		18	0.9	N/A
Majority		1,362	66.7	N/A
Turnout		2,040	81.0	N/A
National hold		Swing	N/A	

=== Frankfort ===
General election 1929: Frankfort
Party	Candidate	Votes	%	±%
National	J. B. Wessels	1,431	73.5	N/A
South African	G. P. le R. Maree	480	24.7	New
Rejected ballots		36	1.8	N/A
Majority		951	48.8	N/A
Turnout		1,947	76.8	N/A
National hold		Swing	N/A	

=== Harrismith ===
General election 1929: Harrismith
Party	Candidate	Votes	%	±%
National	A. A. Cilliers	1,413	66.7	+2.0
South African	H. N. W. Botha	677	31.9	−2.4
Rejected ballots		30	1.4	+0.4
Majority		736	34.8	+4.4
Turnout		2,120	77.7	+8.4
National hold		Swing	+2.2	

=== Heilbron ===
General election 1929: Heilbron
Party	Candidate	Votes	%	±%
National	M. L. Malan	1,503	77.0	+2.1
South African	C. J. Roos	419	21.5	−2.0
Rejected ballots		31	1.3	-0.1
Majority		1,084	55.5	+4.1
Turnout		1,953	77.9	+0.3
National hold		Swing	+2.1	

=== Hoopstad ===
General election 1929: Hoopstad
Party	Candidate	Votes	%	±%
National	E. A. Conroy	1,340	69.5	+0.3
South African	G. R. Theron	542	28.1	−0.7
Rejected ballots		45	2.4	+0.4
Majority		798	41.6	+1.0
Turnout		1,927	73.9	+1.6
National hold		Swing	+0.5	

=== Kroonstad ===
General election 1929: Kroonstad
Party	Candidate	Votes	%	±%
National	P. J. Terreblanche	1,532	69.2	+5.5
South African	H. P. Meyer	635	28.7	−6.7
Rejected ballots		46	2.1	+1.2
Majority		897	40.5	+12.2
Turnout		2,213	77.6	−0.4
National hold		Swing	+6.1	

=== Ladybrand ===
General election 1929: Ladybrand
Party	Candidate	Votes	%	±%
National	C. R. Swart	1,482	74.2	−2.1
South African	H. C. van Breda	499	25.0	+2.2
Rejected ballots		16	0.8	-0.1
Majority		983	49.2	−4.3
Turnout		1,997	77.0	+1.1
National hold		Swing	-2.2	

=== Lindley ===
General election 1929: Lindley
Party	Candidate	Votes	%	±%
National	D. G. Conradie	1,560	72.5	New
South African	P. D. de Wet	569	26.5	New
Rejected ballots		22	1.0	N/A
Majority		991	46.0	N/A
Turnout		2,151	79.3	N/A
National win (new seat)				

=== Senekal ===
General election 1929: Senekal
Party	Candidate	Votes	%	±%
National	W. J. M. Visser	1,545	79.3	New
South African	C. V. Botha	370	19.0	New
Rejected ballots		33	1.7	N/A
Majority		1,175	60.3	N/A
Turnout		1,948	75.2	N/A
National win (new seat)				

=== Smithfield-Rouxville ===
General election 1929: Smithfield-Rouxville
Party	Candidate	Votes	%	±%
National	J. B. M. Hertzog	1,560	84.1	+2.4
South African	J. A. Oberholzer	259	14.0	−2.7
Rejected ballots		37	1.9	+0.3
Majority		1,301	70.1	+5.1
Turnout		1,856	75.4	−1.3
National hold		Swing	+2.6	

=== Vredefort ===
General election 1929: Vredefort
Party	Candidate	Votes	%	±%
National	J. H. Munnik	1,417	65.8	−1.5
South African	H. O. Vos	699	32.5	+0.7
Rejected ballots		37	1.7	+0.8
Majority		718	33.3	−2.2
Turnout		2,153	80.9	+10.6
National hold		Swing	-1.1	

=== Wepener ===
General election 1929: Wepener
Party	Candidate	Votes	%	±%
National	F. D. du Toit	1,466	77.1	+2.6
South African	G. L. Steytler	415	21.8	−2.8
Rejected ballots		20	1.1	+0.2
Majority		1,051	55.3	+5.4
Turnout		1,901	74.3	+14.9
National hold		Swing	+2.7	

=== Winburg ===
General election 1929: Winburg
Party	Candidate	Votes	%	±%
National	N. J. van der Merwe	1,585	73.0	−1.0
South African	F. R. Cronjé	564	26.0	+1.1
Rejected ballots		21	1.0	-0.1
Majority		782	47.0	−2.1
Turnout		2,170	78.5	−3.6
National hold		Swing	-1.1	

== Transvaal ==
Party	Votes	%	Seats
South African Party	55,468	44.19	14
National Party	51,294	40.86	34
Labour Party (Creswell)	11,034	8.79	4
Labour Party (National Council)	5,538	4.41	3
Ind. National	86	0.07	0
Independents	2,115	1.68	0
Total	125,535	100.00	55
Source: Schoeman

=== Barberton ===
General election 1929: Barberton
Party	Candidate	Votes	%	±%
South African	Deneys Reitz	1,095	59.3	+10.6
National	C. L. Worral	732	39.6	−11.2
Rejected ballots		20	1.1	+0.6
Majority		363	19.7	N/A
Turnout		2,323	80.0	+15.2
South African gain from National		Swing	+10.9	

=== Benoni ===
General election 1929: Benoni
Party	Candidate	Votes	%	±%
Labour (N.C.)	Walter Madeley	934	37.0	-32.1
Labour (Creswell)	R. B. Waterston	884	35.0	New
South African	H. P. Venter	700	27.7	−2.8
Rejected ballots		7	0.3	-0.1
Majority		50	2.0	N/A
Turnout		2,525	92.6	+14.0
Labour hold		Swing	N/A	

=== Bethal ===
General election 1929: Bethal
Party	Candidate	Votes	%	±%
National	Tielman Roos	1,252	52.0	+2.7
South African	H. S. Grobler	1,145	47.5	−2.8
Rejected ballots		12	0.5	+0.1
Majority		107	4.5	N/A
Turnout		2,409	89.7	+6.4
National gain from South African		Swing	+2.8	

=== Bezuidenhout ===
General election 1929: Bezuidenhout
Party	Candidate	Votes	%	±%
South African	Leslie Blackwell	1,580	63.0	+10.8
Labour (Creswell)	C. H. Hayward	925	36.9	−10.6
Rejected ballots		5	0.1	-0.2
Majority		655	26.1	+21.4
Turnout		2,510	79.5	−2.1
South African hold		Swing	+10.7	

=== Boksburg ===
General election 1929: Boksburg
Party	Candidate	Votes	%	±%
Labour (Creswell)	J. J. McMenamin	1,453	52.5	+1.0
South African	E. Goodman	1,259	45.5	−2.8
Labour (N.C.)	D. B. Davies	44	1.6	New
Rejected ballots		14	0.4	+0.1
Majority		194	7.0	+3.8
Turnout		2,770	80.7	−1.9
Labour hold		Swing	+1.9	

=== Brakpan ===
General election 1929: Brakpan
Party	Candidate	Votes	%	±%
National	A. S. van Hees	1,618	62.5	New
South African	R. C. Hitchcock	921	35.6	+6.7
Labour (N.C.)	J. Allen	38	1.5	New
Rejected ballots		13	0.4	+-0
Majority		697	26.9	N/A
Turnout		2,590	81.6	+3.0
National gain from Labour		Swing	N/A	

=== Brits ===
General election 1929: Brits
Party	Candidate	Votes	%	±%
National	Hjalmar Reitz	1,472	59.4	New
Independent	C. C. Logan	954	38.5	New
Rejected ballots		52	2.1	N/A
Majority		518	20.9	N/A
Turnout		2,478	78.2	N/A
National win (new seat)				

=== Carolina ===
General election 1929: Carolina
Party	Candidate	Votes	%	±%
National	W. H. Rood	1,239	51.8	New
South African	L. P. H. Botha	1,127	47.1	New
Rejected ballots		26	1.1	N/A
Majority		112	4.7	N/A
Turnout		2,392	85.9	N/A
National win (new seat)				

=== Christiana ===
General election 1929: Christiana
Party	Candidate	Votes	%	±%
National	H. H. Moll	1,239	63.2	−1.0
South African	H. I. Powell	704	35.9	+0.9
Rejected ballots		17	0.9	+0.1
Majority		535	27.3	−1.9
Turnout		1,960	77.6	+19.8
National hold		Swing	-1.0	

=== Delarey ===
General election 1929: Delarey
Party	Candidate	Votes	%	±%
National	L. M. Wentzel	1,343	65.1	−0.2
South African	A. P. Visser	703	34.1	−0.3
Rejected ballots		16	0.8	+0.5
Majority		640	31.0	+0.1
Turnout		2,062	81.0	+7.5
National hold		Swing	+0.1	

=== Denver ===
General election 1929: Denver
Party	Candidate	Votes	%	±%
Labour (Creswell)	Frederic Creswell	1,311	51.8	-13.2
South African	H. J. Hofmeyr	1,102	43.5	+9.9
Labour (N.C.)	R. V. Hall	112	4.4	New
Rejected ballots		6	0.3	-0.1
Majority		209	8.3	−23.1
Turnout		2,531	80.2	+0.2
Labour hold		Swing	-11.6	

=== Ermelo ===
General election 1929: Ermelo
Party	Candidate	Votes	%	±%
South African	William Richard Collins	1,328	53.1	+0.2
National	S. P. Bekker	1,164	46.5	−0.2
Rejected ballots		11	0.4	+-0
Majority		164	6.6	+0.4
Turnout		2,503	92.0	+9.5
South African hold		Swing	+0.2	

=== Fordsburg ===
General election 1929: Fordsburg
Party	Candidate	Votes	%	±%
National	J. S. F. Pretorius	1,257	59.4	−2.1
South African	H. L. Lindsay	821	38.8	+2.0
Rejected ballots		38	1.8	+0.1
Majority		436	20.6	−4.1
Turnout		2,116	73.9	−3.4
National hold		Swing	-2.1	

=== Germiston ===
General election 1929: Germiston
Party	Candidate	Votes	%	±%
Labour (Creswell)	George Brown	1,618	68.0	+10.0
Labour (N.C.)	J. Allen	741	31.2	New
Rejected ballots		19	0.8	+0.2
Majority		877	36.8	N/A
Turnout		2,378	76.0	+4.9
Labour hold		Swing	N/A	

=== Gezina ===
General election 1929: Gezina
Party	Candidate	Votes	%	±%
National	B. J. Pienaar	1,493	62.1	New
South African	A. E. Campbell	903	37.6	New
Rejected ballots		7	0.3	N/A
Majority		590	24.5	N/A
Turnout		2,403	81.0	N/A
National win (new seat)				

=== Heidelberg ===
General election 1929: Heidelberg
Party	Candidate	Votes	%	±%
National	S. D. de Wet	1,384	58.3	+5.6
South African	F. W. R. Robertson	981	41.3	−5.5
Rejected ballots		11	0.6	+0.1
Majority		403	17.0	+11.1
Turnout		2,376	88.7	+8.3
National hold		Swing	+5.6	

=== Hospital ===
General election 1929: Hospital
Party	Candidate	Votes	%	±%
South African	Robert Hugh Henderson	1,472	60.4	+9.2
National	B. Alexander	951	39.0	New
Rejected ballots		13	0.6	+0.3
Majority		521	21.4	N/A
Turnout		2,436	75.0	+1.1
South African hold		Swing	N/A	

=== Jeppes ===
General election 1929: Jeppes
Party	Candidate	Votes	%	±%
Labour (Creswell)	Harry Sampson	1,230	51.1	-13.7
South African	H. Carter	1,064	44.2	+10.2
Labour (N.C.)	H. Carruthers	101	4.2	N/A
Rejected ballots		13	0.5	-0.3
Majority		166	6.9	−23.9
Turnout		2,408	76.6	+5.3
Labour hold		Swing	-12.0	

=== Johannesburg North ===
General election 1929: Johannesburg North
Party	Candidate	Votes	%	±%
South African	Lourens Geldenhuys	1,220	49.8	−2.3
Labour (Creswell)	J. Duthie	1,219	49.7	+2.4
Rejected ballots		13	0.5	-0.1
Majority		1	0.1	−4.7
Turnout		2,452	81.8	+3.5
South African hold		Swing	-2.4	

=== Klerksdorp ===
General election 1929: Klerksdorp
Party	Candidate	Votes	%	±%
National	P. C. de Villiers	1,354	54.4	−2.2
South African	J. A. Nesser	934	45.4	+2.1
Rejected ballots		7	0.2	+0.1
Majority		420	9.0	−4.3
Turnout		2,563	84.4	−3.7
National hold		Swing	-2.2	

=== Krugersdorp ===
General election 1929: Krugersdorp
Party	Candidate	Votes	%	±%
National	B. R. Hattingh	1,393	54.4	−3.2
South African	J. T. Halse	1,163	45.4	+3.4
Rejected ballots		7	0.2	-0.2
Majority		230	9.0	−6.6
Turnout		2,563	84.4	+9.8
National hold		Swing	-3.3	

=== Langlaagte ===
General election 1929: Langlaagte
Party	Candidate	Votes	%	±%
Labour (Creswell)	John Christie	1,135	51.3	-3.5
South African	Willam Bawden	1,064	48.1	+3.3
Rejected ballots		15	0.6	+0.2
Majority		71	3.2	−6.8
Turnout		2,214	78.5	−2.7
Labour hold		Swing	-3.4	

=== Lichtenburg ===
General election 1929: Lichtenburg
Party	Candidate	Votes	%	±%
National	A. J. Swanepoel	1,421	66.2	+0.2
South African	C. M. L. Taljaard	678	31.6	−1.4
Independent	M. C. P. Brink	32	1.5	New
Rejected ballots		16	0.7	-0.2
Majority		743	34.6	+1.6
Turnout		2,147	62.1	−19.2
National hold		Swing	+0.8	

=== Losberg ===
General election 1929: Losberg
Party	Candidate	Votes	%	±%
National	G. P. Brits	1,156	50.3	−0.7
South African	J. B. Wolmarans	1,118	48.7	+0.1
Rejected ballots		24	1.0	+0.6
Majority		38	1.6	−0.8
Turnout		2,298	86.7	+4.3
National hold		Swing	-0.4	

=== Lydenburg ===
General election 1929: Lydenburg
Party	Candidate	Votes	%	±%
National	Elias de Souza	1,184	55.2	+5.8
South African	Jacobus Nieuwenhuize	946	44.1	−5.7
Rejected ballots		18	0.8	N/A
Majority		238	11.1	N/A
Turnout		2,144	85.2	+3.0
National gain from South African		Swing	+5.8	

=== Magaliesberg ===
General election 1929: Magaliesberg
Party	Candidate	Votes	%	±%
National	S. F. Alberts	1,210	58.8	New
South African	N. J. Pretorius	819	39.8	New
Rejected ballots		29	1.4	N/A
Majority		391	19.0	N/A
Turnout		2,058	83.8	N/A
National win (new seat)				

=== Marico ===
General election 1929: Marico
Party	Candidate	Votes	%	±%
National	J. J. Pienaar	1,233	57.2	−4.7
South African	S. F. Hummelen	906	42.0	+4.5
Rejected ballots		18	0.8	+0.2
Majority		327	15.2	−9.2
Turnout		2,157	87.9	+1.1
National hold		Swing	-4.6	

=== Middelburg ===
General election 1929: Middelburg
Party	Candidate	Votes	%	±%
National	J. D. Heyns	1,259	54.5	+1.2
South African	B. D. Bierman	986	42.7	−3.6
Rejected ballots		66	2.8	+2.4
Majority		273	11.8	+4.8
Turnout		2,311	86.1	−0.2
National hold		Swing	+2.4	

=== North East Rand ===
General election 1929: North East Rand
Party	Candidate	Votes	%	±%
National	C. S. H. Potgieter	1,095	51.2	−2.6
South African	G. J. Stoop	880	41.1	−4.8
Labour (N.C.)	H. E. W. C. Barrett	140	6.5	New
Rejected ballots		25	1.2	+0.9
Majority		176	10.1	+2.2
Turnout		2,140	78.5	−2.8
National hold		Swing	+1.1	

=== Parktown ===
General election 1929: Parktown
Party	Candidate	Votes	%	±%
South African	Willie Rockey	1,702	84.1	+5.9
National	S. Kramer	309	15.3	New
Rejected ballots		13	0.6	+0.5
Majority		1,397	68.8	N/A
Turnout		2,024	70.0	−2.5
South African hold		Swing	N/A	

=== Pietersburg ===
General election 1929: Pietersburg
Party	Candidate	Votes	%	±%
National	Tom Naudé	1,297	59.0	+2.6
South African	B. G. L. Enslin	890	40.5	−2.7
Rejected ballots		13	0.5	+0.1
Majority		407	18.5	+5.3
Turnout		2,200	85.3	+8.4
National hold		Swing	+2.7	

=== Potchefstroom ===
General election 1929: Potchefstroom
Party	Candidate	Votes	%	±%
National	M. L. Fick	1,385	52.8	+0.2
South African	B. D. Pienaar	1,228	46.8	−0.4
Rejected ballots		12	0.4	+0.2
Majority		157	6.0	+0.6
Turnout		2,625	87.1	−1.3
National hold		Swing	+0.3	

=== Potgietersrus ===
General election 1929: Potgietersrus
Party	Candidate	Votes	%	±%
National	S. W. Naudé	1,033	52.5	New
South African	A. H. Geyser	886	45.0	New
Rejected ballots		49	2.5	N/A
Majority		147	7.5	N/A
Turnout		1,968	77.6	N/A
National win (new seat)				

=== Pretoria Central ===
General election 1929: Pretoria Central
Party	Candidate	Votes	%	±%
South African	P. V. Pocock	1,539	54.5	+5.9
National	Charles te Water	1,276	45.2	−5.7
Rejected ballots		9	0.3	-0.2
Majority		263	9.3	N/A
Turnout		2,824	81.9	−1.3
South African gain from National		Swing	+5.8	

=== Pretoria District ===
General election 1929: Pretoria District
Party	Candidate	Votes	%	±%
National	Harm Oost	1,198	60.7	New
South African	F. A. G. Wolmarans	760	38.5	New
Rejected ballots		17	0.8	N/A
Majority		438	12.2	N/A
Turnout		1,975	81.2	N/A
National win (new seat)				

=== Pretoria East ===
General election 1929: Pretoria East
Party	Candidate	Votes	%	±%
South African	C. W. Giovanetti	1,754	66.9	+6.3
National	H. Toms	860	32.8	New
Rejected ballots		7	0.3	+-0
Majority		894	34.1	N/A
Turnout		2,621	80.2	−0.6
South African hold		Swing	N/A	

=== Pretoria West ===
General election 1929: Pretoria West
Party	Candidate	Votes	%	±%
National	M. S. W. du Toit	1,397	55.1	New
South African	C. W. Clark	1,050	41.4	−0.4
Labour (N.C.)	T. B. Rutherford	57	2.3	New
Rejected ballots		33	1.2	+0.9
Majority		347	15.7	N/A
Turnout		2,537	81.3	−1.5
National gain from Labour		Swing	N/A	

=== Roodepoort ===
General election 1929: Roodepoort
Party	Candidate	Votes	%	±%
South African	Charles Stallard	1,153	49.9	+4.8
Labour (Creswell)	J. R. Oelofse	1,142	49.4	−5.0
Rejected ballots		16	0.7	+0.2
Majority		11	0.5	N/A
Turnout		2,311	80.8	+0.6
South African gain from Labour		Swing	+4.9	

=== Rustenburg ===
General election 1929: Rustenburg
Party	Candidate	Votes	%	±%
National	P. G. W. Grobler	1,304	59.1	+6.4
South African	W. R. F. Teichmann	886	40.2	−6.6
Rejected ballots		16	0.7	+0.2
Majority		418	18.9	+13.0
Turnout		2,206	84.4	−0.7
National hold		Swing	+6.5	

=== Soutpansberg ===
General election 1929: Soutpansberg
Party	Candidate	Votes	%	±%
National	W. H. Vorster	1,083	53.7	−1.5
South African	J. R. van Breda	914	45.3	+0.9
Rejected ballots		20	1.0	+0.6
Majority		169	8.4	−2.4
Turnout		2,017	77.8	−2.8
National hold		Swing	-1.2	

=== Springs ===
General election 1929: Springs
Party	Candidate	Votes	%	±%
South African	R. N. Kotzé	1,218	53.2	+10.1
Independent	J. Mackay	1,064	46.4	New
Rejected ballots		9	0.4	+0.1
Majority		154	6.8	N/A
Turnout		2,291	82.2	+5.7
South African gain from Labour		Swing	N/A	

=== Standerton ===
General election 1929: Standerton
Party	Candidate	Votes	%	±%
South African	Jan Smuts	1,281	53.2	−3.8
National	Oswald Pirow	1,108	46.0	+3.5
Rejected ballots		20	0.8	+0.3
Majority		173	7.2	−7.3
Turnout		2,409	93.0	+13.3
South African hold		Swing	-3.7	

=== Swartruggens ===
General election 1929: Swartruggens
Party	Candidate	Votes	%	±%
National	J. D. H. Verster	1,107	50.0	New
South African	H. Mentz	1,099	49.6	New
Rejected ballots		9	0.4	N/A
Majority		8	0.4	N/A
Turnout		2,215	87.6	N/A
National win (new seat)				

=== Troyeville ===
General election 1929: Troyeville
Party	Candidate	Votes	%	±%
Labour (N.C.)	Morris Kentridge	1,452	57.5	+3.9
South African	F. H. Thompson	993	39.3	−4.5
Independent	S. W. Fussell	65	2.6	New
Rejected ballots		14	0.6	+0.4
Majority		459	18.2	+8.4
Turnout		2,524	77.9	−2.4
Labour hold		Swing	+4.2	

=== Turffontein ===
General election 1929: Turffontein
Party	Candidate	Votes	%	±%
South African	Frederick Sturrock	1,343	51.5	+18.0
Labour (Creswell)	A. C. Fordham	1,252	48.0	−1.3
Rejected ballots		14	0.5	+0.1
Majority		91	3.5	N/A
Turnout		2,609	79.1	−1.5
South African gain from Labour		Swing	+9.7	

=== Ventersdorp ===
General election 1929: Ventersdorp
Party	Candidate	Votes	%	±%
National	L. J. Boshoff	1,245	52.4	+0.1
South African	C. H. Mostert	1,127	47.4	−0.2
Rejected ballots		6	0.2	+0.1
Majority		118	5.0	+0.3
Turnout		2,378	85.4	+1.8
National hold		Swing	+0.2	

=== Vereeniging ===
General election 1929: Vereeniging
Party	Candidate	Votes	%	±%
National	Karel Rood	1,529	58.1	New
South African	H. J. Vorster	1,070	40.7	New
Rejected ballots		32	1.2	N/A
Majority		459	17.4	N/A
Turnout		2,631	86.9	N/A
National win (new seat)				

=== Von Brandis ===
General election 1929: Von Brandis
Party	Candidate	Votes	%	±%
South African	Emile Nathan	1,218	60.9	+2.6
Labour (N.C.)	G. A. Hay	774	38.7	−2.8
Rejected ballots		9	0.4	+0.2
Majority		444	22.2	+5.4
Turnout		2,001	66.7	−4.6
South African hold		Swing	+2.7	

=== Vrededorp ===
General election 1929: Vrededorp
Party	Candidate	Votes	%	±%
South African	F. J. Roberts	1,770	76.1	+59.6
National	P. J. J. Wilsenach	455	19.6	−63.3
Ind. National	H. C. M. Fouris	86	3.7	New
Rejected ballots		16	0.6	+-0
Majority		1,427	56.5	N/A
Turnout		2,327	75.1	+7.6
South African gain from National		Swing	+61.5	

=== Wakkerstroom ===
General election 1929: Wakkerstroom
Party	Candidate	Votes	%	±%
National	A. S. Naudé	1,207	54.5	+0.6
South African	B. J. de K. Boshoff	999	45.1	−0.5
Rejected ballots		8	0.4	-0.1
Majority		208	9.4	+1.1
Turnout		2,214	86.9	+1.3
National hold		Swing	+0.6	

=== Waterberg ===
General election 1929: Waterberg
Party	Candidate	Votes	%	±%
National	J. G. Strijdom	1,156	65.6	+6.2
South African	F. P. van Deventer	573	32.5	−7.4
Rejected ballots		33	1.9	+1.2
Majority		583	33.1	+13.6
Turnout		1,762	75.3	+2.0
National hold		Swing	+6.8	

=== Witbank ===
General election 1929: Witbank
Party	Candidate	Votes	%	±%
National	G. T. Robertson	1,140	55.3	−0.1
South African	H. J. Bekker	890	43.2	−0.8
Rejected ballots		31	1.5	+0.9
Majority		250	12.1	+0.7
Turnout		2,061	83.3	−0.5
National hold		Swing	+0.4	

=== Wolmaransstad ===
General election 1929: Wolmaransstad
Party	Candidate	Votes	%	±%
National	Jan Kemp	1,356	68.9	−0.4
South African	L. A. S. Lemmer	599	30.4	+0.4
Rejected ballots		14	0.7	+-0
Majority		757	38.5	−0.8
Turnout		1,969	81.9	+10.9
National hold		Swing	-0.4	

=== Wonderboom ===
General election 1929: Wonderboom
Party	Candidate	Votes	%	±%
National	H. D. van Broekhuizen	1,350	65.7	−7.6
South African	A. H. W. Luderitz	670	32.6	+6.2
Rejected ballots		36	1.7	+0.6
Majority		1,070	33.1	−13.8
Turnout		2,056	78.3	+4.3
National hold		Swing	-6.9	

=== Yeoville ===
General election 1929: Yeoville
Party	Candidate	Votes	%	±%
South African	Patrick Duncan	1,559	67.6	−1.2
National	H. J. Schlosberg	735	31.9	New
Rejected ballots		11	0.5	+0.3
Majority		824	35.7	N/A
Turnout		2,305	84.7	+9.1
South African hold		Swing	N/A	
