= Potgietersrus (House of Assembly of South Africa constituency) =

South African constituency, 1929–1994

- Former constituency for the South African House of Assembly
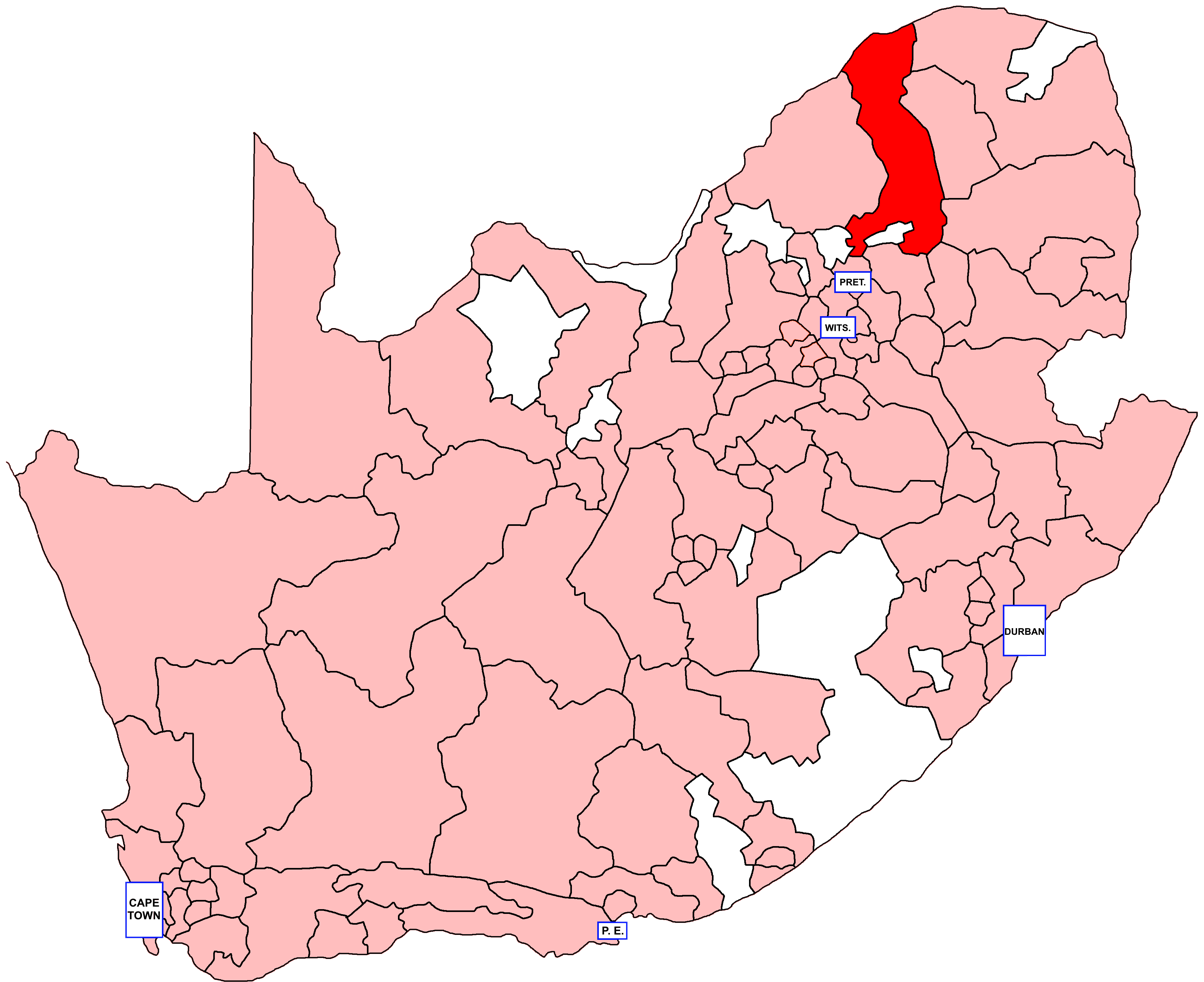
- Location of Potgietersrus within South Africa(1981)
- Province: Transvaal
- Electorate: 18,747 (1989)

Former constituency
- Created: 1929; 1966
- Abolished: 1943; 1994
- Number of members: 1
- Last MHA: D. S. Pienaar (CP)
- Created from: Groblersdal (1966)
- Replaced by: Limpopo (1994)

Potgietersrus was a constituency in the Transvaal Province of South Africa, which existed from 1929 to 1943 and again from 1966 to 1994. It covered a rural area in the northern Transvaal centred on the town of Potgietersrus (since renamed Mokopane). Throughout its existence it elected one member to the House of Assembly and one to the Transvaal Provincial Council.

== Franchise notes ==
When the Union of South Africa was formed in 1910, the electoral qualifications in use in each pre-existing colony were kept in place. In the Transvaal Colony, and its predecessor the South African Republic, the vote was restricted to white men, and as such, elections in the Transvaal Province were held on a whites-only franchise from the beginning. The franchise was also restricted by property and education qualifications until the 1933 general election, following the passage of the Women's Enfranchisement Act, 1930 and the Franchise Laws Amendment Act, 1931. From then on, the franchise was given to all white citizens aged 21 or over. Non-whites remained disenfranchised until the end of apartheid and the introduction of universal suffrage in 1994.

== History ==
Potgietersrus was first created in 1929, as part of the general expansion of the House of Assembly for that year's general election. Like most of the rural Transvaal, it was a conservative seat with a largely Afrikaans-speaking electorate. Throughout its first iteration, it was represented by a single MP: the Reverend Schalk Willem Naudé, who was elected representing the National Party. His first election saw a stiff challenge from the South African Party, but in 1933, the SAP and NP fought the election as a coalition, and Naudé faced only an independent opponent. The two coalition parties merged into the United Party after the election, and Naudé joined the new party and was re-elected under its banner in 1938. When the seat was abolished in 1943, he left parliament.

Potgietersrus returned to the electoral map in 1966, as part of the general expansion of the House of Assembly in that year. By this time, the National Party was South Africa's dominant party, and they comfortably took the new seat with former Groblersdal MP Marthinus Johannes Hendrik Bekker. However, Bekker left parliament the following year, leading to a by-election where party colleague Fanie Herman was elected unopposed. Herman held the seat by wide margins through the 1970s, but his successors had more mixed luck in the 1980s. The Conservative Party, founded by Andries Treurnicht in 1982 to oppose the NP's plans to grant limited political power to non-whites, was sweeping the rural Transvaal, and Potgietersrus was adjacent to Treurnicht's own seat of Waterberg. At the 1987 general election, Conservative candidate David Schalk Pienaar won the seat, and he was comfortably re-elected at the last whites-only general election in 1989. In the 1992 referendum on ending apartheid, Potgietersrus formed part of the Pietersburg referendum area, the only region of South Africa to vote "No".

== Members ==
Election	Member	Party
1929	S. W. Naudé	National
1933	S. W. Naudé	National
1934	S. W. Naudé	United
1938	S. W. Naudé	United
1943	constituency abolished	

Election	Member	Party
1966	M. J. H. Bekker	National
1967 by	Fanie Herman	National
1970	Fanie Herman	National
1974	Fanie Herman	National
1977	Fanie Herman	National
1981	W. J. Snyman	National
1987	D. S. Pienaar	Conservative
1989	D. S. Pienaar	Conservative
1994	constituency abolished	

== Detailed results ==
=== Elections in the 1920s ===
General election 1929: Potgietersrus
Party	Candidate	Votes	%	±%
National	S. W. Naudé	1,033	52.5	New
South African	A. H. Geyser	886	45.0	New
Rejected ballots		49	2.5	N/A
Majority		147	7.5	N/A
Turnout		1,968	77.6	N/A
National win (new seat)				

=== Elections in the 1930s ===
General election 1933: Potgietersrus
Party	Candidate	Votes	%	±%
National	S. W. Naudé	2,076	59.6	+7.1
Independent	J. G. Peens	1,343	38.6	New
Rejected ballots		65	1.8	-0.7
Majority		733	21.0	N/A
Turnout		3,484	66.7	−8.9
National hold		Swing	N/A	

General election 1938: Potgietersrus
Party	Candidate	Votes	%	±%
United	S. W. Naudé	2,255	50.4	−9.2
Purified National	D. J. Naudé	2,176	48.6	New
Rejected ballots		45	1.0	-0.8
Majority		79	1.8	N/A
Turnout		4,476	84.3	+7.6
United hold		Swing	N/A	
