= Carolina (House of Assembly of South Africa constituency) =

- Former constituency for the South African House of Assembly
- Province: Transvaal
- Electorate: 5,204 (1938)

Former constituency
- Created: 1929
- Abolished: 1943
- Number of members: 1
- Last MHA: J. P. Fourie (UP)
- Created from: Barberton

Carolina was a constituency in the Transvaal Province of South Africa, which existed from 1929 to 1943. It covered a rural area in the eastern Transvaal, centred on the town of Carolina. Throughout its existence it elected one member to the House of Assembly and one to the Transvaal Provincial Council.

== Franchise notes ==
When the Union of South Africa was formed in 1910, the electoral qualifications in use in each pre-existing colony were kept in place. In the Transvaal Colony, and its predecessor the South African Republic, the vote was restricted to white men, and as such, elections in the Transvaal Province were held on a whites-only franchise from the beginning. The franchise was also restricted by property and education qualifications until the 1933 general election, following the passage of the Women's Enfranchisement Act, 1930 and the Franchise Laws Amendment Act, 1931. From then on, the franchise was given to all white citizens aged 21 or over. Non-whites remained disenfranchised until the end of apartheid and the introduction of universal suffrage in 1994.

== History ==
Like most of the rural Transvaal, Carolina was a conservative seat with a largely Afrikaans-speaking electorate. It was held for nearly its entire existence by the National Party, with the exception of its last few years, after J. B. M. Hertzog and Jan Smuts joined forces to create the United Party in 1934. Carolina's Nationalist MP, Willem Hendrik Rood, joined the new party, and his party colleague successfully defended the seat in 1938 against Purified National Party opposition.

== Members ==
Election	Member	Party
1929	W. H. Rood	National
1933	W. H. Rood	National
1934	W. H. Rood	United
1938	J. P. Fourie	United
1943	Constituency abolished	

== Detailed results ==
=== Elections in the 1920s ===
General election 1929: Carolina
Party	Candidate	Votes	%	±%
National	W. H. Rood	1,239	51.8	New
South African	L. P. H. Botha	1,127	47.1	New
Rejected ballots		26	1.1	N/A
Majority		112	4.7	N/A
Turnout		2,392	85.9	N/A
National win (new seat)				

=== Elections in the 1930s ===
General election 1933: Carolina
Party	Candidate	Votes	%	±%
National	W. H. Rood	2,245	52.0	+0.2
Independent	H. F. Prinsloo	2,037	47.2	New
Rejected ballots		32	0.8	-0.3
Majority		208	4.8	N/A
Turnout		4,314	77.5	−8.4
National hold		Swing	N/A	

General election 1938: Carolina
Party	Candidate	Votes	%	±%
United	J. P. Fourie	2,573	62.7	+10.7
Purified National	J. C. Fourie	1,481	36.1	New
Rejected ballots		51	1.2	+0.4
Majority		1,092	26.6	N/A
Turnout		4,105	78.9	+1.4
United hold		Swing	N/A	
