= Cathcart (House of Assembly of South Africa constituency) =

Former South African parliamentary constituency (1929–1938)

- Former constituency for the South African House of Assembly
- Province: Cape of Good Hope
- Electorate: 3,252 (1929)

Former constituency
- Created: 1929
- Abolished: 1938
- Number of members: 1
- Last MHA: C. M. van Coller (UP)
- Replaced by: Queenstown

Cathcart was a short-lived constituency in the Cape Province of South Africa, which existed from 1929 to 1938. It covered a rural area of the Eastern Cape, centred on its namesake town of Cathcart. Throughout its existence it elected one member to the House of Assembly and one to the Cape Provincial Council.

== Franchise notes ==
When the Union of South Africa was formed in 1910, the electoral qualifications in use in each pre-existing colony were kept in place. The Cape Colony had implemented a “colour-blind” franchise known as the Cape Qualified Franchise, which included all adult literate men owning more than £75 worth of property (controversially raised from £25 in 1892), and this initially remained in effect after the colony became the Cape Province. As of 1908, 22,784 out of 152,221 electors in the Cape Colony were “Native or Coloured”. Eligibility to serve in Parliament and the Provincial Council, however, was restricted to whites from 1910 onward.

The first challenge to the Cape Qualified Franchise came with the Women's Enfranchisement Act, 1930 and the Franchise Laws Amendment Act, 1931, which extended the vote to women and removed property qualifications for the white population only – non-white voters remained subject to the earlier restrictions. In 1936, the Representation of Natives Act removed all black voters from the common electoral roll and introduced three “Native Representative Members”, white MPs elected by the black voters of the province and meant to represent their interests in particular. A similar provision was made for Coloured voters with the Separate Representation of Voters Act, 1951, and although this law was challenged by the courts, it went into effect in time for the 1958 general election, which was thus held with all-white voter rolls for the first time in South African history. The all-white franchise would continue until the end of apartheid and the introduction of universal suffrage in 1994.

== History ==
Like most of the Eastern Cape, Cathcart’s electorate was broadly loyal to the pro-British side of South African politics. Throughout its short existence, Cathcart had only one MP: Clifford Meyer van Coller, elected for the South African Party in both of the seat’s general elections and switching to the United Party on the latter’s establishment in 1934. In 1929, van Coller faced only an independent opponent, and in 1933, like many major-party MPs across South Africa, he was unopposed. On its abolition, van Coller moved to the neighbouring seat of Queenstown, and would serve as Speaker of the House of Assembly from 1944 to 1948 while representing that seat.

== Members ==
Election	Member	Party
1929	Clifford Meyer van Coller	South African
1933	Clifford Meyer van Coller	South African
1934	Clifford Meyer van Coller	United
1938	constituency abolished	

== Detailed results ==
=== Elections in the 1920s ===
General election 1929: Cathcart
Party	Candidate	Votes	%	±%
South African	C. M. van Coller	1,562	64.9	New
Independent	A. F. Lyon	802	33.3	New
Rejected ballots		44	1.8	N/A
Majority		760	31.6	N/A
Turnout		2,408	74.1	N/A
South African win (new seat)				

=== Elections in the 1930s ===
General election 1933: Cathcart
Party	Candidate	Votes	%	±%
South African	C. M. van Coller	Unopposed		
South African hold				
