= Senekal (House of Assembly of South Africa constituency) =

- Former constituency for the South African House of Assembly
- Province: Orange Free State
- Electorate: 6,833 (1938)

Former constituency
- Created: 1929
- Abolished: 1943
- Number of members: 1
- Last MHA: P. W. A. Pieterse (HNP)
- Replaced by: Heilbron

Senekal was a constituency in the Orange Free State Province of South Africa, which existed from 1929 to 1943. Named after the town of Senekal, the seat covered a rural area in the east of the province. Throughout its existence, it elected one member to the House of Assembly.

== Franchise notes ==
When the Union of South Africa was formed in 1910, the electoral qualifications in use in each pre-existing colony were kept in place. In the Orange River Colony, and its predecessor the Orange Free State, the vote was restricted to white men, and as such, elections in the Orange Free State Province were held on a whites-only franchise from the beginning. The franchise was also restricted by property and education qualifications until the 1933 general election, following the passage of the Women's Enfranchisement Act, 1930 and the Franchise Laws Amendment Act, 1931. From then on, the franchise was given to all white citizens aged 21 or over. Non-whites remained disenfranchised until the end of apartheid and the introduction of universal suffrage in 1994.

== History ==
Senekal was created in 1929 as part of the general expansion of the House of Assembly, which saw the Orange Free State gain one seat in the House. Like most of the Orange Free State, it was a highly conservative seat and had a largely Afrikaans-speaking electorate. It was held throughout its history by the National Party, whose candidate Willoughby James Medford Visser got nearly eighty percent of the vote in its first election in 1929. In 1933, like many incumbent MPs across South Africa, he was re-elected unopposed, and when he left parliament in 1935, he and the bulk of the National Party had followed J. B. M. Hertzog into the United Party. This was a controversial move among the Free State's electorate, and Senekal became a marginal seat for the last few years of its existence, with the UP narrowly winning the by-election to replace Visser and then narrowly losing the seat to the hardline Purified National Party at the 1938 general election. The Free State lost a seat in the 1943 delimitation, and Senekal was chosen to be abolished, but its MP, Pieter Willem Adriaan Pieterse, stood for and won the neighbouring seat of Heilbron.

== Members ==
Election	Member	Party
1929	Willoughby James Medford Visser	National
1933	Willoughby James Medford Visser	National
1934	Willoughby James Medford Visser	United
1935 by	P. A. Froneman	United
1938	Pieter Willem Adriaan Pieterse	GNP
1940	Pieter Willem Adriaan Pieterse	HNP
1943	constituency abolished	

== Detailed results ==
=== Elections in the 1920s ===
General election 1929: Senekal
Party	Candidate	Votes	%	±%
National	W. J. M. Visser	1,545	79.3	New
South African	C. V. Botha	370	19.0	New
Rejected ballots		33	1.7	N/A
Majority		1,175	60.3	N/A
Turnout		1,948	75.2	N/A
National win (new seat)				

=== Elections in the 1930s ===
General election 1933: Senekal
Party	Candidate	Votes	%	±%
National	W. J. M. Visser	Unopposed		
National hold				

Senekal by-election, 14 August 1935
Party	Candidate	Votes	%	±%
United	P. A. Froneman	2,711	51.2	New
Purified National	Jan Jonathan Serfontein	2,532	47.8	New
Majority		50	1.0	N/A
Majority		179	3.4	N/A
Turnout		5,293	86.4	N/A
United gain from National		Swing	N/A	

General election 1938: Senekal
Party	Candidate	Votes	%	±%
Purified National	Pieter Willem Adriaan Pieterse	3,269	51.1	New
United	P. A. Froneman	3,114	48.6	N/A
Rejected ballots		19	0.3	N/A
Majority		155	2.4	N/A
Turnout		6,402	93.7	N/A
Purified National gain from United		Swing	N/A	
