= Mowbray (House of Assembly of South Africa constituency) =

- Former constituency for the South African House of Assembly
- Province: Cape of Good Hope

Former constituency
- Created: 1929
- Abolished: 1953
- Number of members: 1
- Last MHA: R. S. Brooke (UP)

Mowbray was a constituency in the Cape Province of South Africa, which existed from 1929 to 1953. It covered a small area of the inner southern suburbs of Cape Town, centred on its namesake suburb. Throughout its existence it elected one member to the House of Assembly and one to the Cape Provincial Council.

== Franchise notes ==
When the Union of South Africa was formed in 1910, the electoral qualifications in use in each pre-existing colony were kept in place. The Cape Colony had implemented a "colour-blind" franchise known as the Cape Qualified Franchise, which included all adult literate men owning more than £75 worth of property (controversially raised from £25 in 1892), and this initially remained in effect after the colony became the Cape Province. As of 1908, 22,784 out of 152,221 electors in the Cape Colony were "Native or Coloured". Eligibility to serve in Parliament and the provincial council, however, was restricted to whites from 1910 onward.

The first challenge to the Cape Qualified Franchise came with the Women's Enfranchisement Act, 1930 and the Franchise Laws Amendment Act, 1931, which extended the vote to women and removed property qualifications for the white population only – non-white voters remained subject to the earlier restrictions. In 1936, the Representation of Natives Act removed all black voters from the common electoral roll and introduced three "Native Representative Members", white MPs elected by the black voters of the province and meant to represent their interests in particular. A similar provision was made for Coloured voters with the Separate Representation of Voters Act, 1951, and although this law was challenged by the courts, it went into effect in time for the 1958 general election, which was thus held with all-white voter rolls for the first time in South African history. The all-white franchise would continue until the end of apartheid and the introduction of universal suffrage in 1994.

== History ==
Mowbray was created in 1929, out of parts of the abolished Liesbeek and Rondebosch seats (the latter would reappear for the very next election), and like the rest of Cape Town at the time, it was loyal to the liberal and pro-British side of South African politics. Its first MP, Ralph William Close, had previously represented Rondebosch. Close and his successor, Frank Joubert, both came from the South African Party (SAP), and when the SAP merged into the United Party, Joubert came along. He resigned in 1939 to take up appointment as Administrator of the Cape Province, but the seat remained safe for the UP until its abolition.

== Members ==
Election	Member	Party
1929	R. W. Close	South African
1933	Frank Joubert	South African
1934	Frank Joubert	United
1938	Frank Joubert	United
1939 by	W. D. Hare	United
1943	W. D. Hare	United
1948	R. S. Brooke	United
1953	constituency abolished	

== Detailed results ==
=== Elections in the 1920s ===
General election 1929: Mowbray
Party	Candidate	Votes	%	±%
South African	R. W. Close	1,933	63.7	New
Labour (Creswell)	J. Lomax	1,021	33.7	New
Labour (N.C.)	J. A. Cunningham	69	2.3	New
Rejected ballots		10	0.3	N/A
Majority		908	30.0	N/A
Turnout		3,033	76.3	N/A
South African win (new seat)				

=== Elections in the 1930s ===
General election 1933: Mowbray
Party	Candidate	Votes	%	±%
South African	Frank Joubert	Unopposed		
South African hold				

General election 1938: Mowbray
Party	Candidate	Votes	%	±%
United	Frank Joubert	3,909	72.1	N/A
Purified National	J. W. van Zyl	1,461	27.0	New
Rejected ballots		48	0.9	N/A
Majority		2,448	45.2	N/A
Turnout		5,418	68.7	N/A
United hold		Swing	N/A	

Mowbray by-election, 10 October 1939
Party	Candidate	Votes	%	±%
United	W. D. Hare	Unopposed		
United hold				

=== Elections in the 1940s ===
General election 1943: Mowbray
Party	Candidate	Votes	%	±%
United	W. D. Hare	Unopposed		
United hold				
