= Lindley (House of Assembly of South Africa constituency) =

- Former constituency for the South African House of Assembly
- Province: Orange Free State
- Electorate: 2,151 (1929)

Former constituency
- Created: 1929
- Abolished: 1933
- Number of members: 1
- Last MHA: D. G. Conradie (NP)

Lindley was a short-lived constituency in the Orange Free State Province of South Africa, which existed only for the 1929 general election. Named after the town of Lindley, the seat covered a rural area in the east of the province. It elected one member to the House of Assembly.

== Franchise notes ==
When the Union of South Africa was formed in 1910, the electoral qualifications in use in each pre-existing colony were kept in place. In the Orange River Colony, and its predecessor the Orange Free State, the vote was restricted to white men, and as such, elections in the Orange Free State Province were held on a whites-only franchise from the beginning. The franchise was also restricted by property and education qualifications until the 1933 general election, following the passage of the Women's Enfranchisement Act, 1930 and the Franchise Laws Amendment Act, 1931. From then on, the franchise was given to all white citizens aged 21 or over. Non-whites remained disenfranchised until the end of apartheid and the introduction of universal suffrage in 1994.

== History ==
Lindley was created in 1929 as part of the general expansion of the House of Assembly, which saw the Orange Free State gain one seat in the House. Like most of the Orange Free State, it was a highly conservative seat and had a largely Afrikaans-speaking electorate. Its only election, in 1929, saw the National Party win the seat by a wide margin, and David Gideon Conradie, former MP for Bethlehem, would represent Lindley throughout its short existence. In the delimitation for the 1933 general election, the Free State lost two seats, and Lindley was abolished just one term after its creation. Conradie later went on to represent Uitenhage during most of the 1950s.

== Members ==
Election	Member	Party
1929	D. G. Conradie	National
1933	constituency abolished	

== Detailed results ==
General election 1929: Lindley
Party	Candidate	Votes	%	±%
National	D. G. Conradie	1,560	72.5	New
South African	P. D. de Wet	569	26.5	New
Rejected ballots		22	1.0	N/A
Majority		991	46.0	N/A
Turnout		2,151	79.3	N/A
National win (new seat)				
