= Hottentots Holland (House of Assembly of South Africa constituency) =

South African constituency, 1929–1966

- Former constituency for the South African House of Assembly
- Province: Cape of Good Hope
- Electorate: 10,926 (1961)

Former constituency
- Created: 1929
- Abolished: 1966
- Number of members: 1
- Last MHA: J. D. de Villiers (NP)

Hottentots Holland was a constituency in the Cape Province of South Africa, which existed from 1929 to 1966. It covered a rural area in the Helderberg region, surrounding what was then known as the Hottentots Holland Mountains. Throughout its existence it elected one member to the House of Assembly and one to the Cape Provincial Council.

== Franchise notes ==
When the Union of South Africa was formed in 1910, the electoral qualifications in use in each pre-existing colony were kept in place. The Cape Colony had implemented a “colour-blind” franchise known as the Cape Qualified Franchise, which included all adult literate men owning more than £75 worth of property (controversially raised from £25 in 1892), and this initially remained in effect after the colony became the Cape Province. As of 1908, 22,784 out of 152,221 electors in the Cape Colony were “Native or Coloured”. Eligibility to serve in Parliament and the Provincial Council, however, was restricted to whites from 1910 onward.

The first challenge to the Cape Qualified Franchise came with the Women's Enfranchisement Act, 1930 and the Franchise Laws Amendment Act, 1931, which extended the vote to women and removed property qualifications for the white population only – non-white voters remained subject to the earlier restrictions. In 1936, the Representation of Natives Act removed all black voters from the common electoral roll and introduced three “Native Representative Members”, white MPs elected by the black voters of the province and meant to represent their interests in particular. A similar provision was made for Coloured voters with the Separate Representation of Voters Act, 1951, and although this law was challenged by the courts, it went into effect in time for the 1958 general election, which was thus held with all-white voter rolls for the first time in South African history. The all-white franchise would continue until the end of apartheid and the introduction of universal suffrage in 1994.

== History ==
Hottentots Holland was one of the best seats in the rural Cape for the South African Party and its successor the United Party. Its most notable MP was UP leader De Villiers Graaff, who won the seat in 1948 against a strong national swing - the only UP gain in that election. He was elected leader of the party in 1956, on J. G. N. Strauss' ouster, but lost the seat to the governing National Party at the 1958 general election. The NP candidate, Jacob Daniël de Villiers, held the seat until its abolition in 1966, at which point he retired from parliament.

== Members ==
Election	Member	Party
1929	P. A. B. Faure	South African
1933	P. A. B. Faure	South African
1934	P. A. B. Faure	United
1938	P. A. B. Faure	United
1942 by	J. G. Carinus	United
1943	J. G. Carinus	United
1946 by	H. J. van Aarde	HNP
1948	De Villiers Graaff	United
1953	De Villiers Graaff	United
1958	J. D. de Villiers	National
1961	J. D. de Villiers	National
1966	constituency abolished	

== Detailed results ==
General election 1929: Hottentots Holland
Party	Candidate	Votes	%	±%
South African	P. A. B. Faure	1,900	53.8	New
National	Henry Allan Fagan	1,573	44.5	New
Rejected ballots		60	1.7	N/A
Majority		327	9.3	N/A
Turnout		3,533	82.1	N/A
South African win (new seat)				

=== Elections in the 1930s ===
General election 1933: Hottentots Holland
Party	Candidate	Votes	%	±%
South African	P. A. B. Faure	Unopposed		
South African hold				

General election 1938: Hottentots Holland
Party	Candidate	Votes	%	±%
United	P. A. B. Faure	3,524	59.4	N/A
Purified National	F. W. Boonzaaier	2,331	39.3	New
Rejected ballots		82	1.3	N/A
Majority		278	20.1	N/A
Turnout		5,937	80.8	N/A
United hold		Swing	N/A	

=== Elections in the 1940s ===
Hottentots Holland by-election, 14 October 1942
Party	Candidate	Votes	%	±%
United	J. G. Carinus	4,761	55.8	−3.6
Purified National	D. J. Kitzinger	3,639	42.7	+3.4
Rejected ballots		129	1.5	+0.2
Majority		1,122	13.2	−6.9
Turnout		8,529	71.6	−9.2
United hold		Swing	-3.5	
