= Rondebosch (House of Assembly of South Africa constituency) =

- Former constituency for the South African House of Assembly
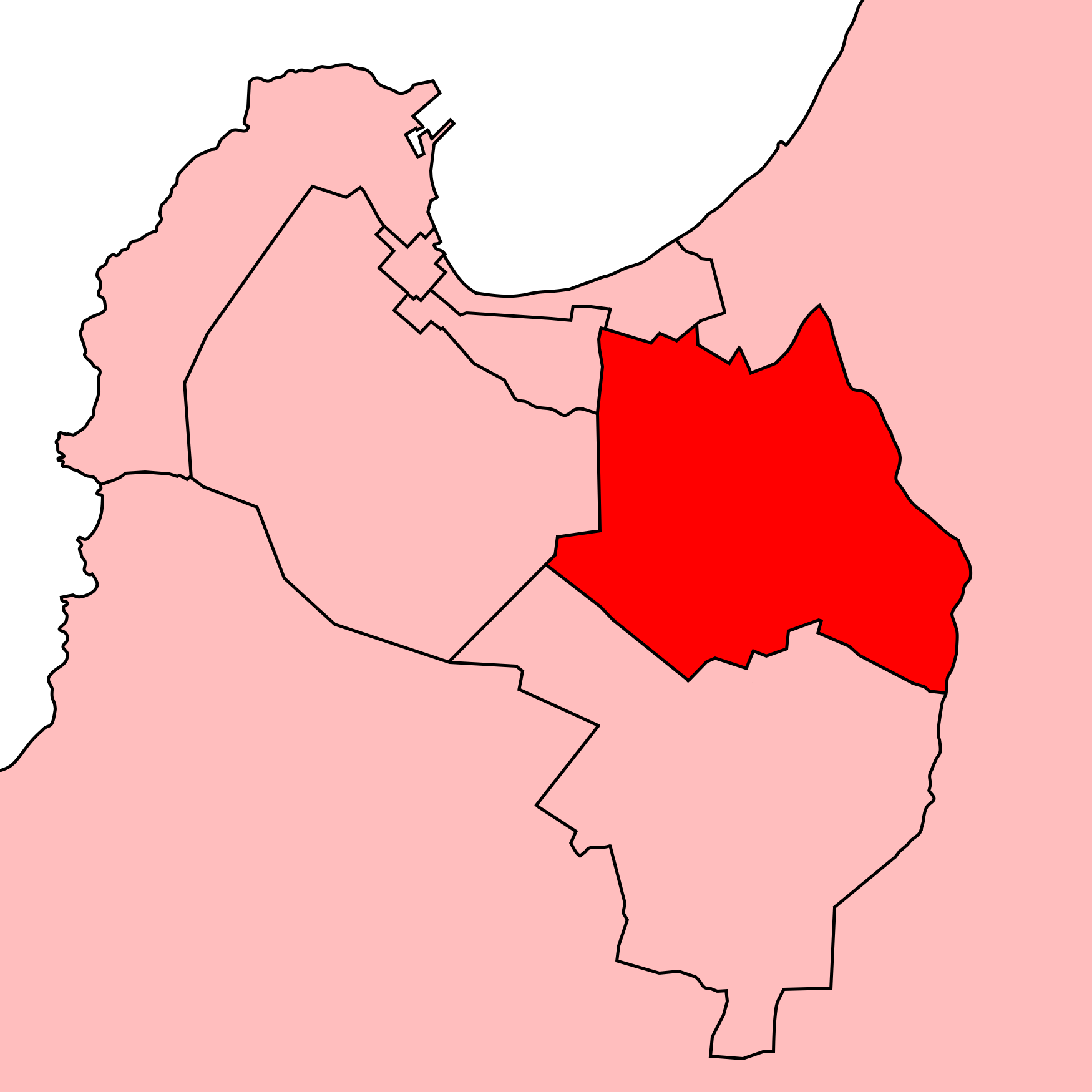
- Location of Rondebosch within Cape Town (1924)
- Province: Cape of Good Hope
- Electorate: 14,275 (1977)

Former constituency
- Created: 1915
- Abolished: 1981
- Number of members: 1
- Last MHA: Frederik van Zyl Slabbert (PFP)
- Created from: Liesbeek
- Replaced by: Western Cape

Rondebosch was a constituency in the Cape Province of South Africa, which existed from 1915 to 1929 and again from 1933 to 1981. It covered parts of Cape Town's southern suburbs, centred on its namesake suburb of Rondebosch. Throughout its existence it elected one member to the House of Assembly and one to the Cape Provincial Council.

== Franchise notes ==
When the Union of South Africa was formed in 1910, the electoral qualifications in use in each pre-existing colony were kept in place. The Cape Colony had implemented a "colour-blind" franchise known as the Cape Qualified Franchise, which included all adult literate men owning more than £75 worth of property (controversially raised from £25 in 1892), and this initially remained in effect after the colony became the Cape Province. As of 1908, 22,784 out of 152,221 electors in the Cape Colony were "Native or Coloured". Eligibility to serve in Parliament and the Provincial Council, however, was restricted to whites from 1910 onward.

The first challenge to the Cape Qualified Franchise came with the Women's Enfranchisement Act, 1930 and the Franchise Laws Amendment Act, 1931, which extended the vote to women and removed property qualifications for the white population only – non-white voters remained subject to the earlier restrictions. In 1936, the Representation of Natives Act removed all black voters from the common electoral roll and introduced three "Native Representative Members", white MPs elected by the black voters of the province and meant to represent their interests in particular. A similar provision was made for Coloured voters with the Separate Representation of Voters Act, 1951, and although this law was challenged by the courts, it went into effect in time for the 1958 general election, which was thus held with all-white voter rolls for the first time in South African history. The all-white franchise would continue until the end of apartheid and the introduction of universal suffrage in 1994.

== History ==
Rondebosch was first created in 1915, out of what had been the urban parts of the Liesbeek constituency. Throughout its existence, it was located entirely within the southern suburbs of Cape Town, and like the rest of that region, its electorate was largely English-speaking, affluent and liberal. Its first MP, Ralph William Close, was elected as a member of the Unionist Party, and joined the South African Party (SAP) when the Unionists merged with them in 1921. He represented Rondebosch throughout the seat's first period of existence, and on its abolition in 1929 moved to the new seat of Mowbray.

Rondebosch was recreated just four years later, however, and once again contained a similar area with similar political leanings. It elected United Party MPs for much of its existence, usually unopposed or by wide margins, and its last MP for the area was De Villiers Graaff, leader of the UP, who had been defeated in Hottentots-Holland in the 1958 election and moved to the much safer seat of Rondebosch in 1961. When the new constituency of Groote Schuur was created in 1974, Graaff moved there, and the open seat in Rondebosch was won by the Progressive Party’s Frederik van Zyl Slabbert, who was the sitting Leader of the Opposition when his seat was abolished in 1981. Rondebosch was largely replaced by the recreated Claremont seat, which Slabbert stood for and won unopposed in the 1981 election.

== Members ==
Election	Member	Party
1915	Ralph William Close	Unionist
1920	Ralph William Close	Unionist
1921	Ralph William Close	South African
1924	Ralph William Close	South African
1929	constituency abolished	

Election	Member	Party
1933	James Chalmers	South African
1934	James Chalmers	United
1938	A. M. Moll	United
1943	A. M. Moll	United
1948	R. D. Pilkington-Jordan	United
1953	R. D. Pilkington-Jordan	United
1958	R. D. Pilkington-Jordan	United
1961	De Villiers Graaff	United
1966	De Villiers Graaff	United
1970	De Villiers Graaff	United
1974	Frederik van Zyl Slabbert	Progressive
1977	Frederik van Zyl Slabbert	PFP
1981	constituency abolished	

== Detailed results ==
=== Elections in the 1910s ===
General election 1915: Rondebosch
Party	Candidate	Votes	%	±%
Unionist	R. W. Close	1,286	57.9	New
Independent	A. Palmer	895	40.3	New
Labour	I. Carver	41	1.8	New
Majority		391	17.6	N/A
Turnout		2,222	61.2	N/A
Unionist win (new seat)				

=== Elections in the 1920s ===
General election 1920: Rondebosch
Party	Candidate	Votes	%	±%
Unionist	R. W. Close	1,241	65.0	−18.3
Labour	J. Seddon	668	35.0	+18.3
Majority		573	30.0	N/A
Turnout		1,909	46.6	−14.6
Unionist hold		Swing	N/A	

General election 1921: Rondebosch
Party	Candidate	Votes	%	±%
South African	R. W. Close	1,637	79.1	+14.1
Labour	J. Seddon	433	20.9	−14.1
Majority		1,204	58.2	+28.2
Turnout		2,070	50.0	+3.4
South African hold		Swing	+14.1	

General election 1924: Rondebosch
Party	Candidate	Votes	%	±%
South African	R. W. Close	1,610	58.3	−20.8
Labour	J. Lomax	1,138	41.2	+20.3
Rejected ballots		13	0.5	N/A
Majority		472	17.1	−41.1
Turnout		2,761	76.1	+26.1
South African hold		Swing	-20.6	

=== Elections in the 1930s ===
General election 1933: Rondebosch
Party	Candidate	Votes	%	±%
South African	James Chalmers	Unopposed		
South African win (new seat)				

General election 1938: Rondebosch
Party	Candidate	Votes	%	±%
United	Abraham Marais Moll	4,771	78.7	N/A
Dominion	G. B. Kipps	1,259	20.8	New
Rejected ballots		30	0.5	N/A
Majority		3,512	58.0	N/A
Turnout		6,060	71.4	N/A
United hold		Swing	N/A	
