= Vereeniging (House of Assembly of South Africa constituency) =

South African constituency, 1929–1994

- Former constituency for the South African House of Assembly
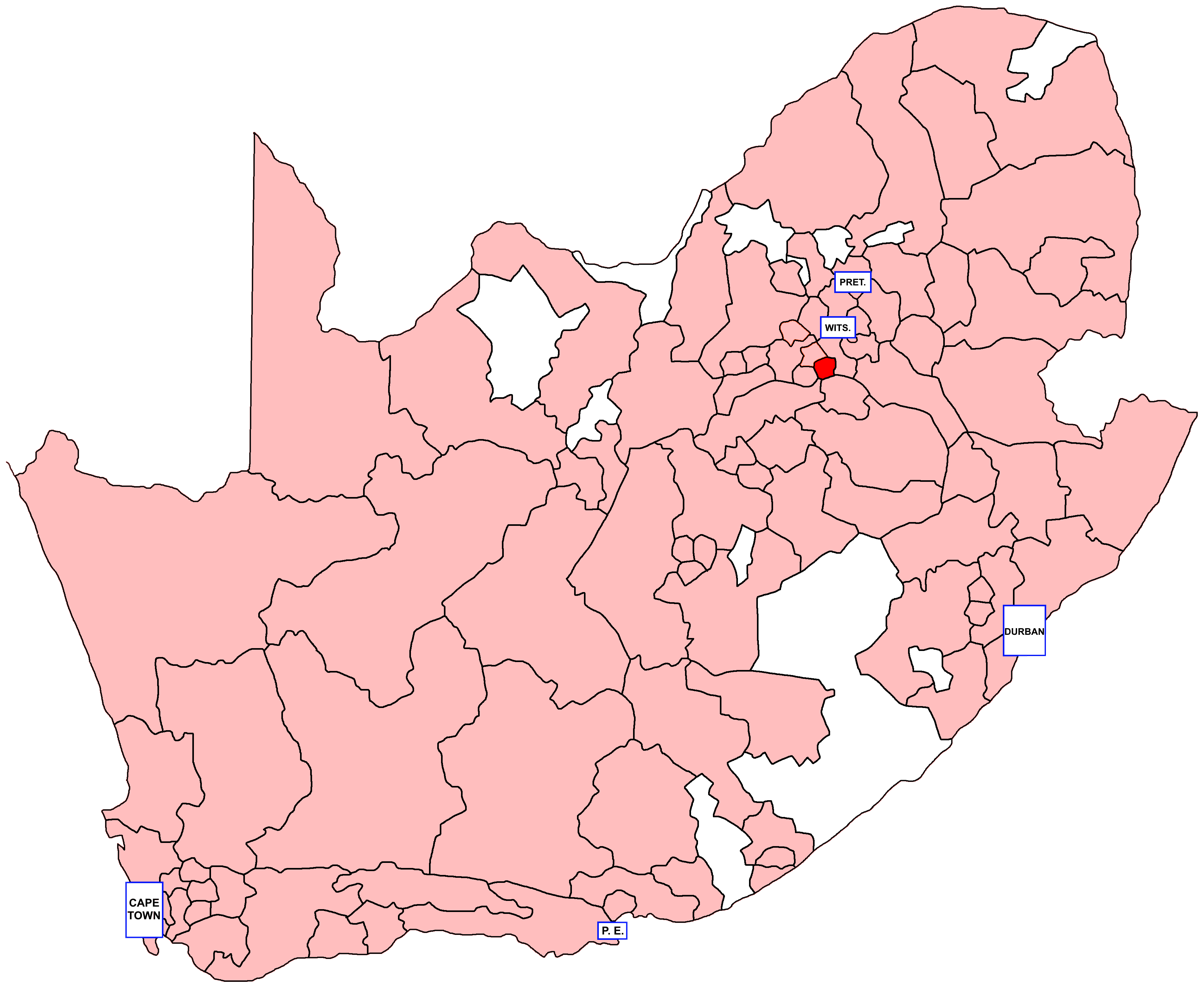
- Location of Vereeniging within South Africa(1981)
- Province: Transvaal
- Electorate: 21,729 (1989)

Former constituency
- Created: 1929
- Abolished: 1994
- Number of members: 1
- Last MHA: Thomas Gunning (NP)
- Replaced by: Gauteng

Vereeniging was a constituency in the Transvaal Province of South Africa, which existed from 1929 to 1994. It covered a part of the southern Transvaal centred on the industrial town of Vereeniging. Throughout its existence it elected one member to the House of Assembly and one to the Transvaal Provincial Council.

== Franchise notes ==
When the Union of South Africa was formed in 1910, the electoral qualifications in use in each pre-existing colony were kept in place. In the Transvaal Colony, and its predecessor the South African Republic, the vote was restricted to white men, and as such, elections in the Transvaal Province were held on a whites-only franchise from the beginning. The franchise was also restricted by property and education qualifications until the 1933 general election, following the passage of the Women's Enfranchisement Act, 1930 and the Franchise Laws Amendment Act, 1931. From then on, the franchise was given to all white citizens aged 21 or over. Non-whites remained disenfranchised until the end of apartheid and the introduction of universal suffrage in 1994.

== History ==
Vereeniging was first created in 1929, as part of the general expansion of the House of Assembly for that year's general election. It leaned towards the National Party for most of its history, but it also had a tendency to favour independent personalities. Its first MP, former Vereeniging Commando commander Karel Rood, started out as a Nationalist but became a loyal supporter of the United Party, staying with the party through the 1940s and defending the seat in 1948 even as much of the Transvaal fell to the National Party. He left parliament in 1949, and the seat went through a marginal period with both UP and NP winning elections, but from 1958 on, it was held consistently by the NP. Barzillai "Blaar" Coetzee, first elected in that year, served until 1972, when he resigned to take up the position of ambassador to Italy. The resulting by-election saw a convincing win for the seat's final big personality: Frederik Willem de Klerk. De Klerk was known as a conservative during his early years in politics, but following his elevation to the state presidency in 1989, he became responsible for opening up negotiations with the African National Congress that led to the end of apartheid. During this period, as in much of the Transvaal, Vereeniging saw strong contests from the hardline Conservative Party, but both de Klerk and his successor Thomas Gunning were able to hold the seat.

== Members ==
| Election | Member | Party |
|---|---|---|
| 1929 | Karel Rood | National |
| 1933 | Karel Rood | National |
| 1934 | Karel Rood | United |
| 1938 | Karel Rood | United |
| 1943 | Karel Rood | United |
| 1948 | Karel Rood | United |
| 1949 by | J. H. Lock | National |
| 1953 | S. J. M. Steyn | United |
| 1958 | Blaar Coetzee | National |
| 1961 | Blaar Coetzee | National |
| 1966 | Blaar Coetzee | National |
| 1970 | Blaar Coetzee | National |
| 1972 by | F. W. de Klerk | National |
| 1974 | F. W. de Klerk | National |
| 1977 | F. W. de Klerk | National |
| 1981 | F. W. de Klerk | National |
| 1987 | F. W. de Klerk | National |
| 1989 | Thomas Gunning | National |
| 1994 | constituency abolished | |

== Detailed results ==
=== Elections in the 1920s ===
General election 1929: Vereeniging
| Party | Candidate | Votes | % | ±% |
|---|---|---|---|---|
| National | Karel Rood | 1,529 | 58.1 | New |
| South African | H. J. Vorster | 1,070 | 40.7 | New |
| Rejected ballots | | 32 | 1.2 | N/A |
| Majority | | 459 | 17.4 | N/A |
| Turnout | | 2,631 | 86.9 | N/A |
| National win (new seat) | | | | |

=== Elections in the 1930s ===
General election 1933: Vereeniging
| Party | Candidate | Votes | % | ±% |
|---|---|---|---|---|
| National | Karel Rood | Unopposed | | |
| National hold | | | | |

General election 1938: Vereeniging
| Party | Candidate | Votes | % | ±% |
|---|---|---|---|---|
| United | Karel Rood | 4,820 | 73.8 | N/A |
| Purified National | W. F. H. Huyzers | 1,634 | 25.0 | New |
| Rejected ballots | | 78 | 1.2 | N/A |
| Majority | | 3,186 | 48.8 | N/A |
| Turnout | | 6,532 | 84.2 | N/A |
| | | Swing | N/A | |
