= Gezina (House of Assembly of South Africa constituency) =

South African constituency, 1929–1994

- Former constituency for the South African House of Assembly
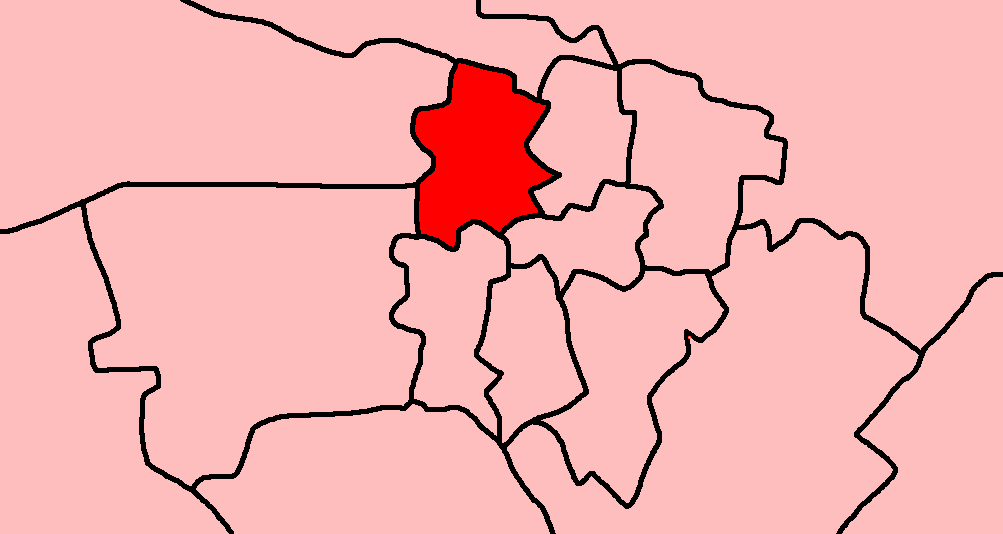
- Location of Gezina within Pretoria (1981)
- Province: Transvaal
- Electorate: 19,773 (1989)

Former constituency
- Created: 1929; 1966
- Abolished: 1958; 1994
- Number of members: 1
- Last MHA: K. D. Swanepoel (NP)
- Created from: Wonderboom
- Replaced by: Hercules (1958); Gauteng (1994)

Gezina was a constituency in the Transvaal Province of South Africa, which existed from 1929 to 1958 and again from 1966 to 1994. It covered an area in the northern suburbs of Pretoria, the administrative capital of South Africa, centred on the suburb of Gezina. Throughout its existence it elected one member to the House of Assembly and one to the Transvaal Provincial Council.

== Franchise notes ==
When the Union of South Africa was formed in 1910, the electoral qualifications in use in each pre-existing colony were kept in place. In the Transvaal Colony, and its predecessor the South African Republic, the vote was restricted to white men, and as such, elections in the Transvaal Province were held on a whites-only franchise from the beginning. The franchise was also restricted by property and education qualifications until the 1933 general election, following the passage of the Women's Enfranchisement Act, 1930 and the Franchise Laws Amendment Act, 1931. From then on, the franchise was given to all white citizens aged 21 or over. Non-whites remained disenfranchised until the end of apartheid and the introduction of universal suffrage in 1994.

== History ==
Gezina was first created in 1929, as part of the general expansion of the House of Assembly for that year's general election. It mainly took territory from the Wonderboom seat, whose MP Barend Jacobus Pienaar moved to the new seat - however, he left parliament after just three months. This provided an opportunity for National Party stalwart Oswald Pirow, who had just failed in his bid to unseat Jan Smuts from the Standerton constituency, to return to parliament. Pirow would represent Gezina until 1943, and became controversial during World War II as perhaps the most outspoken supporter of Nazi Germany in high-level South African politics. This resulted in him breaking with the National Party in 1942 to found his own "New Order" movement - however, he did not stand for re-election in 1943, and his seat went to an NP member.

From then on, as it had been before, Gezina was a safe Nationalist seat. It was abolished in the 1958 delimitation, with its MP moving to the new seat of Hercules, but in 1966 it was recreated. In its second iteration, it had only two MPs - Jan Hendrik Visse, who moved there from Prinshof in 1966 and served until his departure from parliament in 1975, and Karel David Swanepoel, who was elected in 1975 and held the seat until the end of apartheid. He faced stiff opposition from the Conservative Party at the 1987 and 1989 by-elections, but unlike some other Pretoria seats, Gezina stuck with the governing party.

== Members ==
Election	Member	Party
1929	B. J. Pienaar	National
1929 by	Oswald Pirow	National
1933	Oswald Pirow	National
1934	Oswald Pirow	United
1938	Oswald Pirow	United
1940	Oswald Pirow	HNP
1942	Oswald Pirow	New Order
1943	S. J. Swanepoel	HNP
1948	A. I. Malan	HNP
1953	A. I. Malan	National
1958	constituency abolished	

Election	Member	Party
1966	J. H. Visse	National
1970	J. H. Visse	National
1974	J. H. Visse	National
1975 by	K. D. Swanepoel	National
1977	K. D. Swanepoel	National
1981	K. D. Swanepoel	National
1987	K. D. Swanepoel	National
1989	K. D. Swanepoel	National
1994	constituency abolished	

== Detailed results ==
=== Elections in the 1920s ===
General election 1929: Gezina
Party	Candidate	Votes	%	±%
National	B. J. Pienaar	1,493	62.1	New
South African	A. E. Campbell	903	37.6	New
Rejected ballots		7	0.3	N/A
Majority		590	24.5	N/A
Turnout		2,403	81.0	N/A
National win (new seat)				

Gezina by-election, 23 October 1929
Party	Candidate	Votes	%	±%
National	Oswald Pirow	1,391	67.8	+5.7
South African	J. H. Schoeman	653	31.8	−5.8
Rejected ballots		9	0.4	+0.1
Majority		738	35.9	+11.4
Turnout		2,053	76.4	−4.6
National win (new seat)				

=== Elections in the 1930s ===
General election 1933: Gezina
Party	Candidate	Votes	%	±%
National	Oswald Pirow	Unopposed		
National hold				

General election 1938: Gezina
Party	Candidate	Votes	%	±%
United	Oswald Pirow	3,436	63.7	N/A
Purified National	T. Wassenaar	1,907	35.4	New
Rejected ballots		50	0.9	N/A
Majority		1,529	28.4	N/A
Turnout		5,393	73.3	N/A
United hold		Swing	N/A	
