= Willowmore (House of Assembly of South Africa constituency) =

Former South African parliamentary constituency (1929–1943)

- Former constituency for the South African House of Assembly
- Province: Cape of Good Hope
- Electorate: 6,294 (1938)

Former constituency
- Created: 1929
- Abolished: 1943
- Number of members: 1
- Last MHA: G. P. Steyn (GNP)
- Replaced by: Graaff-Reinet

Willowmore was a constituency in the Cape Province of South Africa, which existed from 1929 to 1943. It covered a rural area of the Eastern Cape, centred on the town of Willowmore. Throughout its existence it elected one member to the House of Assembly and one to the Cape Provincial Council.

== Franchise notes ==
When the Union of South Africa was formed in 1910, the electoral qualifications in use in each pre-existing colony were kept in place. The Cape Colony had implemented a “colour-blind” franchise known as the Cape Qualified Franchise, which included all adult literate men owning more than £75 worth of property (controversially raised from £25 in 1892), and this initially remained in effect after the colony became the Cape Province. As of 1908, 22,784 out of 152,221 electors in the Cape Colony were “Native or Coloured”. Eligibility to serve in Parliament and the Provincial Council, however, was restricted to whites from 1910 onward.

The first challenge to the Cape Qualified Franchise came with the Women's Enfranchisement Act, 1930 and the Franchise Laws Amendment Act, 1931, which extended the vote to women and removed property qualifications for the white population only – non-white voters remained subject to the earlier restrictions. In 1936, the Representation of Natives Act removed all black voters from the common electoral roll and introduced three “Native Representative Members”, white MPs elected by the black voters of the province and meant to represent their interests in particular. A similar provision was made for Coloured voters with the Separate Representation of Voters Act, 1951, and although this law was challenged by the courts, it went into effect in time for the 1958 general election, which was thus held with all-white voter rolls for the first time in South African history. The all-white franchise would continue until the end of apartheid and the introduction of universal suffrage in 1994.

== History ==
Like many constituencies in the rural Cape, the electorate of Willowmore was largely Afrikaans-speaking and conservative, and the seat was won at every election by the National Party. The constituency's only MP was Gabriël Pieter Steyn, who, after most of the National Party merged into the United Party, was one of twenty MPs who broke off to form the Purified National Party under D. F. Malan's leadership. After Willowmore's abolition, he moved to neighbouring Graaff-Reinet, which he continued to represent until 1957.

== Members ==
Election	Member	Party
1929	G. P. Steyn	National
1933	G. P. Steyn	National
1934	G. P. Steyn	GNP
1938	G. P. Steyn	GNP
1943	constituency abolished	

== Detailed results ==
=== Elections in the 1920s ===
General election 1929: Willowmore
Party	Candidate	Votes	%	±%
National	G. P. Steyn	1,759	63.8	New
South African	J. A. L. de Waal	918	33.3	New
Rejected ballots		80	2.9	N/A
Majority		841	30.5	N/A
Turnout		2,757	86.7	N/A
National win (new seat)				

=== Elections in the 1930s ===
General election 1933: Willowmore
Party	Candidate	Votes	%	±%
National	G. P. Steyn	2,758	53.0	−10.8
Independent	G. N. Hayward	918	46.2	New
Rejected ballots		43	0.8	N/A
Majority		353	6.8	N/A
Turnout		5,206	81.4	−5.3
National hold		Swing	N/A	

General election 1938: Willowmore
Party	Candidate	Votes	%	±%
Purified National	G. P. Steyn	3,395	61.7	+8.7
United	A. Taute	2,043	37.1	New
Rejected ballots		62	1.2	+0.4
Majority		1,352	24.6	N/A
Turnout		5,500	87.4	+6.0
Purified National hold		Swing	N/A	
