= Swartruggens (House of Assembly of South Africa constituency) =

- Former constituency for the South African House of Assembly
- Province: Transvaal
- Electorate: 7,045 (1943)

Former constituency
- Created: 1929
- Abolished: 1948
- Number of members: 1
- Last MHA: G. E. J. Henry (UP)

Swartruggens was a constituency in the Transvaal Province of South Africa, which existed from 1929 to 1948. It covered a rural area in the western Transvaal, centred on the town of Swartruggens. Throughout its existence it elected one member to the House of Assembly and one to the Transvaal Provincial Council.

== Franchise notes ==
When the Union of South Africa was formed in 1910, the electoral qualifications in use in each pre-existing colony were kept in place. In the Transvaal Colony, and its predecessor the South African Republic, the vote was restricted to white men, and as such, elections in the Transvaal Province were held on a whites-only franchise from the beginning. The franchise was also restricted by property and education qualifications until the 1933 general election, following the passage of the Women's Enfranchisement Act, 1930 and the Franchise Laws Amendment Act, 1931. From then on, the franchise was given to all white citizens aged 21 or over. Non-whites remained disenfranchised until the end of apartheid and the introduction of universal suffrage in 1994.

== History ==
Like most of the rural Transvaal, Swartruggens was a conservative seat with a largely Afrikaans-speaking electorate. It was initially a safe seat for the National Party, until 1934, when J. B. M. Hertzog and Jan Smuts joined forces to create the United Party. Swartruggens' Nationalist MP, Joseph Dearlove Hardy Verster, joined the new party, and successfully defended the seat in 1938 against Purified National Party opposition. He left parliament in 1943, but his party colleague Gerhardus Evert Jan Henry held the seat in its final election, part of Jan Smuts' wartime wave of support across the Transvaal. It was abolished before the 1948 general election, at which point Henry left parliament.

== Members ==
Election	Member	Party
1929	J. D. H. Verster	National
1933	J. D. H. Verster	National
1934	J. D. H. Verster	United
1938	J. D. H. Verster	United
1943	G. E. J. Henry	United
1948	Constituency abolished	

== Detailed results ==
=== Elections in the 1920s ===
General election 1929: Swartruggens
Party	Candidate	Votes	%	±%
National	J. D. H. Verster	1,107	50.0	New
South African	H. Mentz	1,099	49.6	New
Rejected ballots		9	0.4	N/A
Majority		8	0.4	N/A
Turnout		2,215	87.6	N/A
National win (new seat)				

=== Elections in the 1930s ===
General election 1933: Swartruggens
Party	Candidate	Votes	%	±%
National	J. D. H. Verster	Unopposed		
National hold				

General election 1938: Swartruggens
Party	Candidate	Votes	%	±%
United	J. D. H. Verster	2,272	50.1	N/A
Independent	J. D. Roos	1,871	41.3	New
Purified National	W. J. Loots	372	8.2	New
Rejected ballots		16	0.4	N/A
Majority		401	8.9	N/A
Turnout		4,531	88.4	N/A
United hold		Swing	N/A	
