= Brits (House of Assembly of South Africa constituency) =

- Former constituency for the South African House of Assembly
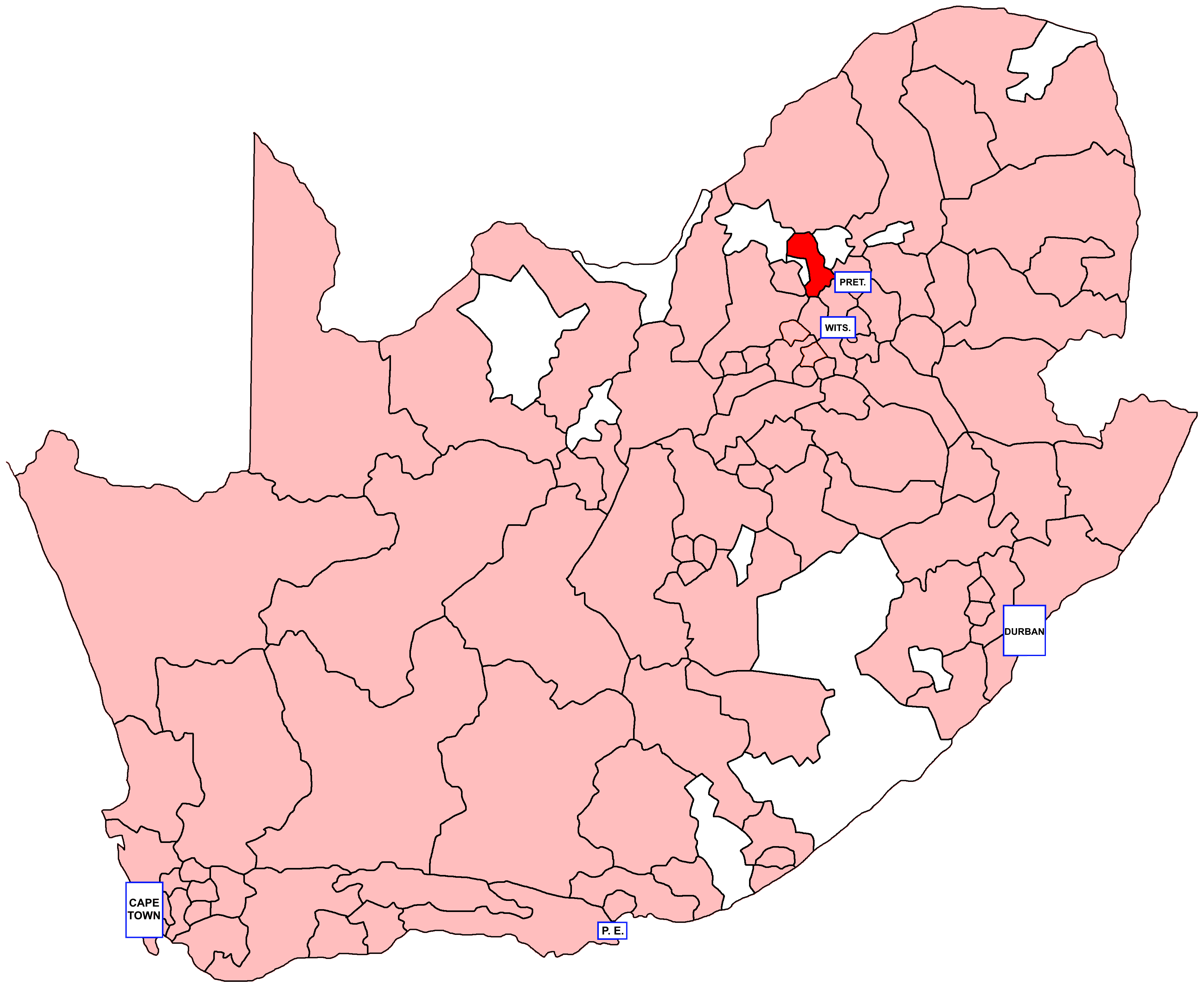
- Location of Brits within South Africa (1981)
- Province: Transvaal
- Electorate: 18,936 (1989)

Former constituency
- Created: 1929
- Abolished: 1994
- Number of members: 1
- Last MHA: Andrew Gerber (CP)
- Replaced by: North West

Brits was a constituency in the Transvaal Province of South Africa, which existed from 1929 to 1994. It covered a rural area west of Pretoria, centred on the town of Brits. Throughout its existence it elected one member to the House of Assembly and one to the Transvaal Provincial Council.

== Franchise notes ==
When the Union of South Africa was formed in 1910, the electoral qualifications in use in each pre-existing colony were kept in place. In the Transvaal Colony, and its predecessor the South African Republic, the vote was restricted to white men, and as such, elections in the Transvaal Province were held on a whites-only franchise from the beginning. The franchise was also restricted by property and education qualifications until the 1933 general election, following the passage of the Women's Enfranchisement Act, 1930 and the Franchise Laws Amendment Act, 1931. From then on, the franchise was given to all white citizens aged 21 or over. Non-whites remained disenfranchised until the end of apartheid and the introduction of universal suffrage in 1994.

== History ==
Like most of the rural Transvaal, Brits was a conservative seat with a largely Afrikaans-speaking electorate. It was held for nearly its entire existence by the National Party, with two exceptions. The first exception was the period from 1934 to 1943, after J. B. M. Hertzog and Jan Smuts joined forces to create the United Party. Brits' Nationalist MP, Jan Harm Grobler, joined the new party and successfully defended his seat in 1938 against Purified National Party opposition. He left the party after South Africa joined World War II, and stood for re-election in 1943 as an independent, but the Herenigde Nasionale Party took the seat with Jacobus Ernst Potgieter as their candidate. Potgieter held the seat until 1977, becoming one of South Africa's longest-serving parliamentarians.

In 1977, Potgieter retired and Johannes Petrus Grobler took over as MP for Brits. He served two terms and retired in 1987, at which point the rising Conservative Party took the seat with Andrew Gerber - one of many rural Transvaal seats to fall to the new party.

== Members ==
Election	Member	Party
1929	Hjalmar Reitz	National
1933	J. H. Grobler	National
1934	J. H. Grobler	United
1938	J. H. Grobler	United
1943	J. E. Potgieter	HNP
1948	J. E. Potgieter	HNP
1953	J. E. Potgieter	National
1958	J. E. Potgieter	National
1961	J. E. Potgieter	National
1966	J. E. Potgieter	National
1970	J. E. Potgieter	National
1974	J. E. Potgieter	National
1977	J. P. Grobler	National
1981	J. P. Grobler	National
1987	Andrew Gerber	Conservative
1989	Andrew Gerber	Conservative
1994	Constituency abolished	

== Detailed results ==
=== Elections in the 1920s ===
General election 1929: Brits
Party	Candidate	Votes	%	±%
National	Hjalmar Reitz	1,472	59.4	New
Independent	C. C. Logan	954	38.5	New
Rejected ballots		52	2.1	N/A
Majority		518	20.9	N/A
Turnout		2,478	78.2	N/A
National win (new seat)				

=== Elections in the 1930s ===
General election 1933: Brits
Party	Candidate	Votes	%	±%
National	J. H. Grobler	2,545	63.4	+4.0
Roos	J. E. Donkin	1,447	36.1	New
Rejected ballots		21	0.5	-1.6
Majority		1,098	27.3	N/A
Turnout		4,013	74.4	−3.8
National hold		Swing	N/A	

General election 1938: Brits
Party	Candidate	Votes	%	±%
United	J. H. Grobler	2,673	56.0	−7.4
Purified National	C. G. du Toit	2,034	42.6	New
Rejected ballots		64	1.4	+0.9
Majority		639	13.4	N/A
Turnout		4,771	85.2	+10.8
United hold		Swing	N/A	
