= Waterberg (House of Assembly of South Africa constituency) =

- Former constituency for the South African House of Assembly
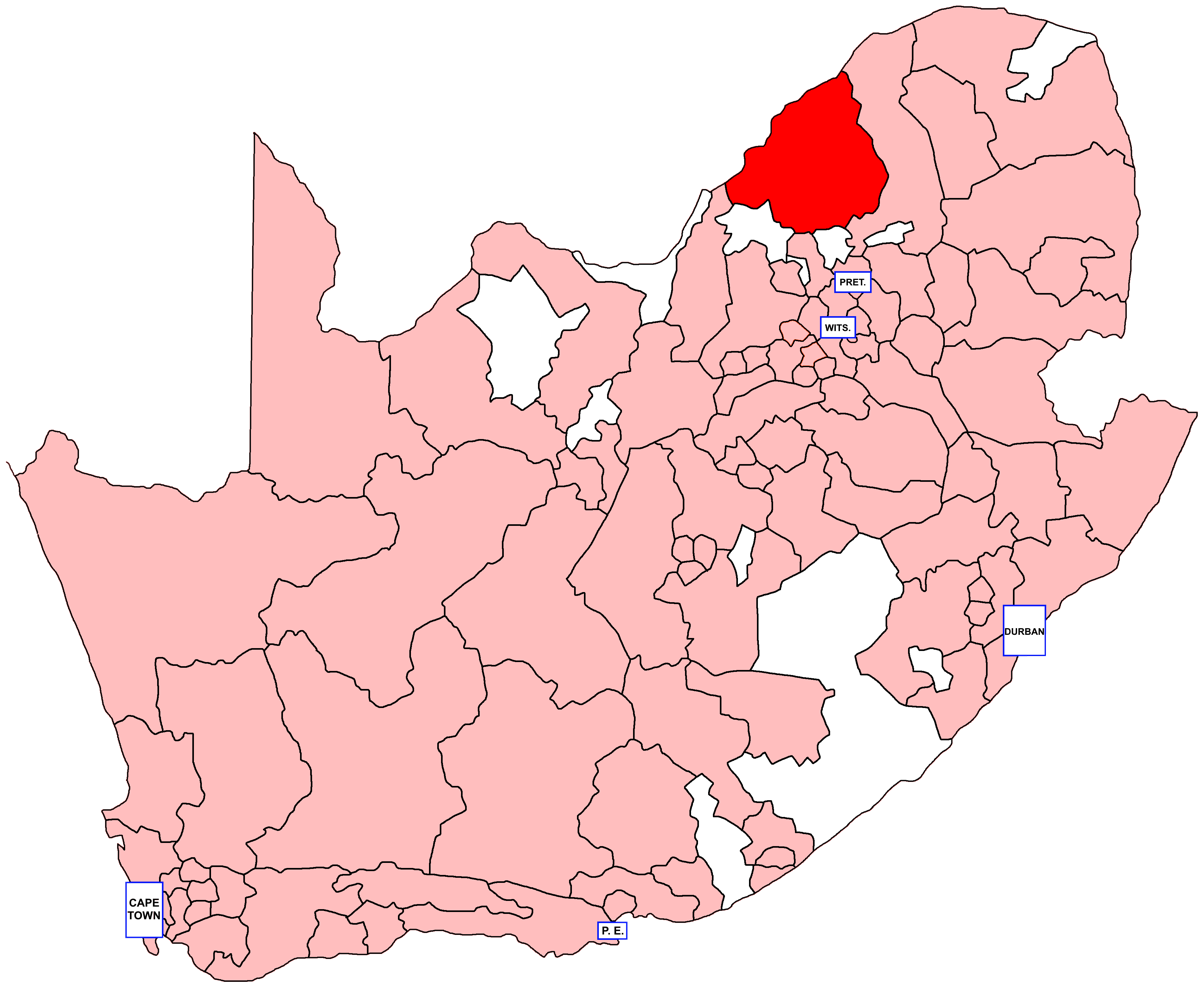
- Location of Waterberg within South Africa (1981)
- Province: Transvaal
- Electorate: 18,776 (1989)

Former constituency
- Created: 1910
- Abolished: 1994
- Number of members: 1
- Last MHA: Andries Treurnicht (CP)
- Replaced by: Limpopo

Waterberg was a constituency in the Transvaal Province of South Africa, which existed from 1910 to 1994. It covered the Waterberg region of the western Transvaal. Throughout its existence it elected one member to the House of Assembly and one to the Transvaal Provincial Council.

== Franchise notes ==
When the Union of South Africa was formed in 1910, the electoral qualifications in use in each pre-existing colony were kept in place. In the Transvaal Colony, and its predecessor the South African Republic, the vote was restricted to white men, and as such, elections in the Transvaal Province were held on a whites-only franchise from the beginning. The franchise was also restricted by property and education qualifications until the 1933 general election, following the passage of the Women's Enfranchisement Act, 1930 and the Franchise Laws Amendment Act, 1931. From then on, the franchise was given to all white citizens aged 21 or over. Non-whites remained disenfranchised until the end of apartheid and the introduction of universal suffrage in 1994.

== History ==
Like most of the rural Transvaal, Waterberg had a largely Afrikaans-speaking electorate, and it was a highly conservative seat throughout its existence. Its political history was dominated by two MPs, both originally elected for the National Party. The first, J. G. Strijdom, was first elected in 1929 and served until his death in 1958. He was the only Transvaal MP to join D. F. Malan's Purified National Party in 1934, and kept the loyalty of his electorate through the Smuts years, when the United Party was dominant elsewhere in the province. In 1954, on Malan's death, he was made Prime Minister by the NP caucus, and served in that role until his own death four years later. He was replaced as MP for Waterberg by Joost Heystek, who served until 1971 and was replaced by the seat's other dominant figure: Andries Treurnicht. Treurnicht, who had previously been a minister of the Dutch Reformed Church (NGK), quickly established himself as a leader of the National Party's hardline right-wing faction, including a stint as Deputy Minister for Education where his decision to implement Afrikaans-medium education in black schools triggered the Soweto uprising. When P. W. Botha moved toward limited reforms in the early 1980s, Treurnicht challenged him for the NP leadership in 1982, and upon losing, formed the Conservative Party alongside 22 like-minded parliamentary colleagues. The new party saw significant gains in both the 1987 and 1989 elections, and Treurnicht served as Leader of the Opposition from 1987 until his death in 1993, about a year before the non-racial 1994 general election. No by-election was held to replace him, making him Waterberg's final MP.

== Members ==
Election	Member	Party
1910	H. C. W. Vermaas	Het Volk
1915	P. W. le Roux van Niekerk	National
1920	P. W. le Roux van Niekerk	National
1921	P. W. le Roux van Niekerk	National
1924	P. W. le Roux van Niekerk	National
1929	J. G. Strijdom	National
1933	J. G. Strijdom	National
1934	J. G. Strijdom	GNP
1938	J. G. Strijdom	GNP
1939	J. G. Strijdom	HNP
1943	J. G. Strijdom	HNP
1948	J. G. Strijdom	HNP
1953	J. G. Strijdom	National
1958	J. G. Strijdom	National
1958 by	Joost Heystek	National
1961	Joost Heystek	National
1966	Joost Heystek	National
1970	Joost Heystek	National
1971 by	Andries Treurnicht	National
1974	Andries Treurnicht	National
1977	Andries Treurnicht	National
1981	Andries Treurnicht	National
1982	Andries Treurnicht	Conservative
1987	Andries Treurnicht	Conservative
1989	Andries Treurnicht	Conservative
1994	Constituency abolished	

== Detailed results ==
=== Elections in the 1910s ===
General election 1910: Waterberg
Party	Candidate	Votes	%	±%
Het Volk	R. G. Nicholson	Unopposed		
Het Volk win (new seat)				

General election 1915: Waterberg
Party	Candidate	Votes	%	±%
National	P. W. le Roux van Niekerk	997	50.1	New
South African	R. G. Nicholson	994	49.9	N/A
Majority		3	0.2	N/A
Turnout		1,991	78.5	N/A
National gain from South African		Swing	N/A	

=== Elections in the 1920s ===
General election 1920: Waterberg
Party	Candidate	Votes	%	±%
National	P. W. le Roux van Niekerk	1,185	61.0	+10.9
South African	F. F. Pienaar	757	38.9	−10.9
Majority		458	22.0	+21.8
Turnout		1,942	72.3	−6.2
National hold		Swing	+10.9	

General election 1921: Waterberg
Party	Candidate	Votes	%	±%
National	Pieter Wynand le Roux van Niekerk	1,211	64.5	+3.5
South African	George Marais	667	35.5	−3.5
Majority		544	29.0	+7.0
Turnout		1,878	67.4	−4.9
National hold		Swing	+3.5	

General election 1924: Waterberg
Party	Candidate	Votes	%	±%
National	P. W. le Roux van Niekerk	1,235	59.4	−5.1
South African	F. P. van Deventer	830	39.9	+4.4
Rejected ballots		16	0.7	N/A
Majority		405	19.5	−9.5
Turnout		2,081	73.3	+5.9
National hold		Swing	-4.8	

General election 1929: Waterberg
Party	Candidate	Votes	%	±%
National	J. G. Strijdom	1,156	65.6	+6.2
South African	F. P. van Deventer	573	32.5	−7.4
Rejected ballots		33	1.9	+1.2
Majority		583	33.1	+13.6
Turnout		1,762	75.3	+2.0
National hold		Swing	+6.8	

=== Elections in the 1930s ===
General election 1933: Waterberg
Party	Candidate	Votes	%	±%
National	J. G. Strijdom	Unopposed		
National hold				

General election 1938: Waterberg
Party	Candidate	Votes	%	±%
Purified National	Johannes Gerhardus Strijdom	2,355	52.1	N/A
United	W. I. S. Driver	2,113	46.8	New
Rejected ballots		49	1.1	N/A
Majority		242	5.4	N/A
Turnout		4,517	89.9	N/A
Purified National hold		Swing	N/A	
