= Women's Enfranchisement Act, 1930 =

South African legislation

Parliament of South Africa
- Long title: Act to provide for the registration of women as voters and for their voting in the election of members of the House of Assembly and Provincial Councils, and for their capacity to be nominated, elected and to sit and vote as Senators, Members of the House of Assembly or of Provincial Councils.
- Citation: Act No. 18 of 1930
- Enacted by: Parliament of South Africa
- Royal assent: 20 May 1930
- Commenced: 21 May 1930
- Repealed: 1 May 1946

Legislative history
- Bill title: Women's Enfranchisement Bill
- Bill citation: A.B. 30—'30
- Introduced by: Prime Minister J. B. M. Hertzog
- Introduced: 6 March 1930

Repealed by
- Electoral Consolidation Act, 1946

Summary
- Extended the vote to white women over the age of 21.

Keywords
- women's suffrage
- Status: Repealed

The Women's Enfranchisement Act, 1930, was an act of the Parliament of South Africa which granted white women aged 21 and older the right to vote and to run for office. It hence diluted the voting power of non-white people in the Cape Province by effectively doubling the number of white voters. It was enacted by the National Party government of Prime Minister J. B. M. Hertzog.

The first general election at which women could vote was the election of 17 May 1933. At that election Leila Reitz (wife of Deneys Reitz) was elected as the first female MP, representing Parktown for the South African Party.

The act enfranchised all white women, while certain property qualifications still applied to men. In June 1931 the Franchise Laws Amendment Act, 1931 enfranchised all white men while retaining the property qualifications for non-white voters, thus further diluting the non-white vote. The delimitation of electoral divisions was still based on the white male population until April 1937, when the Electoral Quota Act, 1937 altered it to be based on the whole white population.

The Women's Enfranchisement Act was repealed in 1946 when the franchise laws were consolidated into the Electoral Consolidation Act, 1946.

== See also ==
- Feminism in South Africa
- Women's Enfranchisement Association of the Union
