= Franchise Laws Amendment Act, 1931 =

Law in South Africa

Parliament of South Africa
- Long title: Act to amend the law relating to the franchise.
- Citation: Act No. 41 of 1931
- Enacted by: Parliament of South Africa
- Royal assent: 10 June 1931
- Commenced: 10 June 1931
- Repealed: 1 May 1946

Legislative history
- Bill title: Franchise Laws (Amendment) Bill
- Bill citation: A.B. 5—'31
- Introduced by: D. F. Malan, Minister of the Interior
- Introduced: 5 February 1931

Repealed by
- Electoral Consolidation Act, 1946

Summary
- Removed all remaining franchise qualifications applying to white men over the age of 21.
- Status: Repealed

The Franchise Laws Amendment Act, 1931, was an act of the Parliament of South Africa which removed all property and educational franchise qualifications applying to white men. It was passed a year after the Women's Enfranchisement Act, 1930, which extended the franchise to all white women. These two acts entitled all white people over the age of 21 (except for those convicted of certain crimes and those declared mentally unsound by a court) to vote in the elections of the House of Assembly.

The act retained the property and educational qualifications for black and coloured men, who were in any case only eligible to vote in the Cape Province. The result was a further dilution of the electoral power of the non-white population.

The act was repealed in 1946 when the franchise laws were consolidated into the Electoral Consolidation Act, 1946.
