= 1929 South African general election =

- 12 June 1929

All 148 seats in the House of Assembly 75 seats needed for a majority
- Registered: 461,820
- Turnout: 75.34% (▼1.89pp)
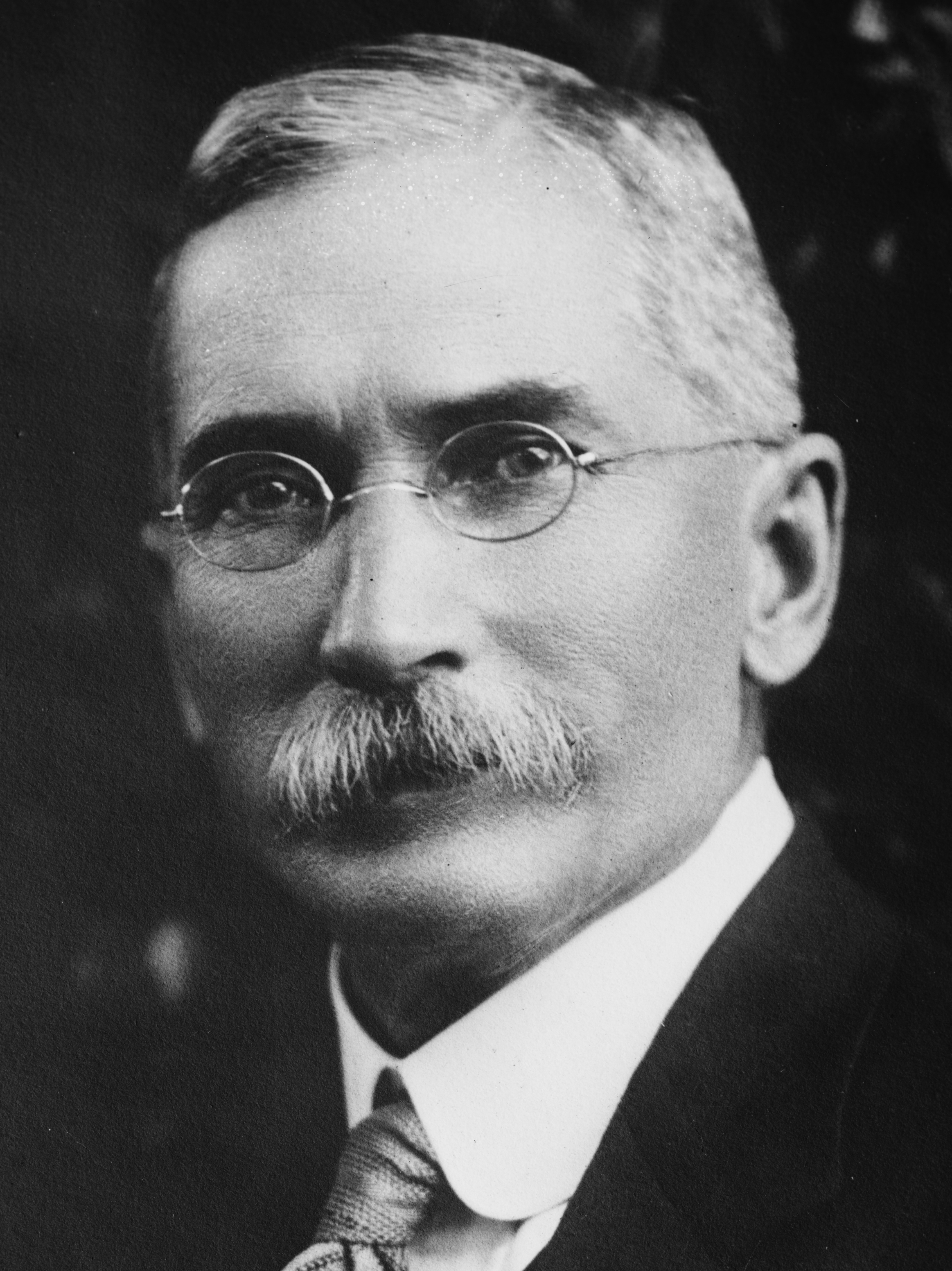

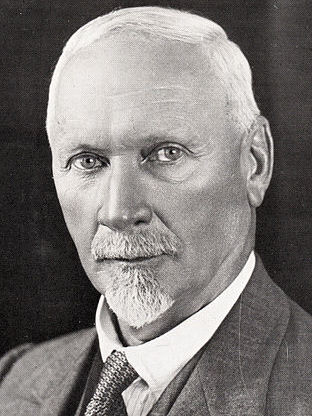
	First party	Second party	Third party
			Lab
Leader	J. B. M. Hertzog	Jan Smuts	Disputed
Party	National	South African	Labour
Leader's seat	Smithfield	Standerton
Last election	35.25%, 63 seats	47.04%, 53 seats	14.35%, 18 seats
Seats won	78	61	8
Seat change	▲15	▲8	▼10
Popular vote	141,579	159,896	33,919
Percentage	41.17%	46.50%	9.86%
Swing	▲5.92pp	▼0.54pp	▼4.49pp
- Results by province
Prime Minister before election
J. B. M. Hertzog
National
Elected Prime Minister
J. B. M. Hertzog
National

General elections were held in South Africa on 12 June 1929. The National Party under J. B. M. Hertzog won an outright majority in the House of Assembly. Hertzog had the opportunity to form a government without the aid of the Labour Party. In fact the Pact government continued, with two ministers from the Creswell Labour faction remaining in office. The National Party remained the dominant party, for its second consecutive term.

Due to the split in the Labour Party, just eight MPs were elected for the party, of whom only four sat on the government benches. The leadership disputed between Colonel Frederic Creswell (of the Creswell Labour faction) and Walter Madeley (from the National Council Labour faction) following the split.

== Delimitation of electoral divisions ==
The South Africa Act 1909 had provided for a delimitation commission to define the boundaries for each electoral division. The representation by province, under the fifth delimitation report of 1928, is set out in the table below. The figures in brackets are the number of electoral divisions in the previous (1923) delimitation. If there is no figure in brackets then the number was unchanged.

Provinces	Cape	Natal	Orange Free State	Transvaal	Total
Divisions	58 (51)	17	18 (17)	55 (50)	148 (135)

== Results ==
Party	Votes	%	Seats	+/–
South African Party	159,896	46.50	61	+8
National Party	141,579	41.17	78	+15
Labour Party	33,919	9.86	8	–10
Independents	8,503	2.47	1	0
Total	343,897	100.00	148	+13
Valid votes	343,897	98.84		
Invalid/blank votes	4,027	1.16		
Total votes	347,924	100.00		
Registered voters/turnout	461,820	75.34		
Source: South Africa 1982

== See also ==
- 1929 in South Africa

== Bibliography ==
- South Africa 1982: Official Yearbook of the Republic of South Africa, published by Chris van Rensburg Publications
- The South African Constitution, by H.J. May (3rd edition 1955, Juta & Co)
