= South African Party =

1911–1934 political party in South Africa

South African Party Afrikaans: Suid-Afrikaanse Party Dutch: Zuidafrikaanse Partij (Note: Contemporary Dutch spelling used in South Africa from 1905 to 1925. Modern Dutch spelling: Zuid-Afrikaanse Partij)
- Leader (s): Louis Botha, Jan Smuts, Barry Hertzog
- Founded: November 1911
- Dissolved: 4 December 1934
- Merger of: Het Volk; South African Party; Afrikaner Bond; Orangia Unie
- Merged into: United Party
- Headquarters: Bloemfontein
- Ideology: Liberal conservatism Afrikaner minority interests
- Political position: Right-wing
- Colours: Light blue

The South African Party (Afrikaans: Suid-Afrikaanse Party, Dutch: Zuidafrikaanse Partij) was a political party that existed in the Union of South Africa from 1911 to 1934.

== History ==
The outline and foundation for the party was realized after the election of a 'South African party' in the 1910 South African general election under the leadership of Louis Botha. Botha called for a "South African National Party" (SANP) at Pretoria's Opera House on 14 June 1910, prior to the 1910 elections, but the Party was only formally created in November 1911 in Bloemfontein. It was made up predominantly of Afrikaner parties:

- Het Volk from the Transvaal
- Afrikaner Bond and South African Party from the Cape Colony
- Orangia Unie from the Orange River Colony

The South African Party of the Cape Colony was launched by William Schreiner, the former attorney-general under the leadership of Cecil Rhodes. The party was intended to project a more moderate platform than that of the Afrikaner Bond. This party also advocated more peaceful relations with neighboring states, especially the Transvaal. Schreiner originally formed the party to oppose the "personal domination of Mr. Rhodes." Eventually, the Afrikaner Bond would lend their support to form a new government.

Initially its main political opposition came from Unionist Party, which supported similar policies, but was more English-speaking and took an instinctively pro-British stance.

The SAP would solidify after the departure of J. B. M. Hertzog and more radical Boer nationalists who formed the National Party.

Rising discontent with the economic policies of the SAP during the bad economic times of the early 1920s culminated in a general strike in 1922. Though a combination of military intervention and negotiation ended the strike, the memory of it remained when the government, now a SAP-Unionist coalition government under the leadership of Jan Smuts, faced the 1924 South African general election, in which it was defeated by a National-Labour coalition. The SAP remained in opposition with its Unionist allies until the unrest of the Great Depression forced Prime Minister Barry Hertzog of the Nationalists to form a coalition government and on 5 December 1934 a merger which created the United South African National Party (more commonly known as the United Party).

From the beginning, a hardliner nationalist faction refused to accept the merger. The remaining nationalists later withdrew from the United Party in 1939, after which what remained was essentially the old SAP under a new name. Nevertheless, the United Party name was retained.

== Electoral history ==
=== House of Assembly elections ===
Election	Party leader	Votes	%	Seats	+/–	Position	Result
1910	Louis Botha	30,052	28.45%	67 / 121	▲67	▲1st	Majority government
1915	Louis Botha	94,285	36.67%	54 / 130	▼15	1st	Majority government
1920	Jan Smuts	101,227	36.48%	41 / 134	▼13	▼2nd	Minority government
1921	Jan Smuts	137,389	49.90%	77 / 134	▲11	▲1st	Majority government
1924	Jan Smuts	148,769	47.04%	53 / 135	▼24	▼2nd	Opposition
1929	Jan Smuts	159,896	46.50%	61 / 148	▲8	2nd	Opposition
1933	Jan Smuts	71,486	22.34%	61 / 150	Steady	2nd	Opposition
