= Results of the 1921 South African general election =

- 8 February 1921

All 134 seats in the House of Assembly 68 seats needed for a majority
- Registered: 499,531
- Turnout: 55.60% (▼11.34pp)
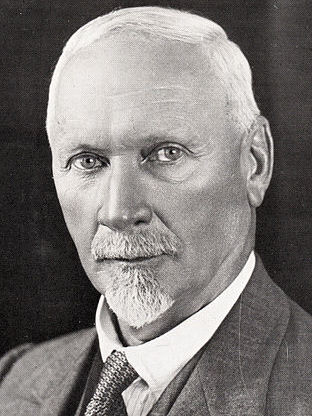

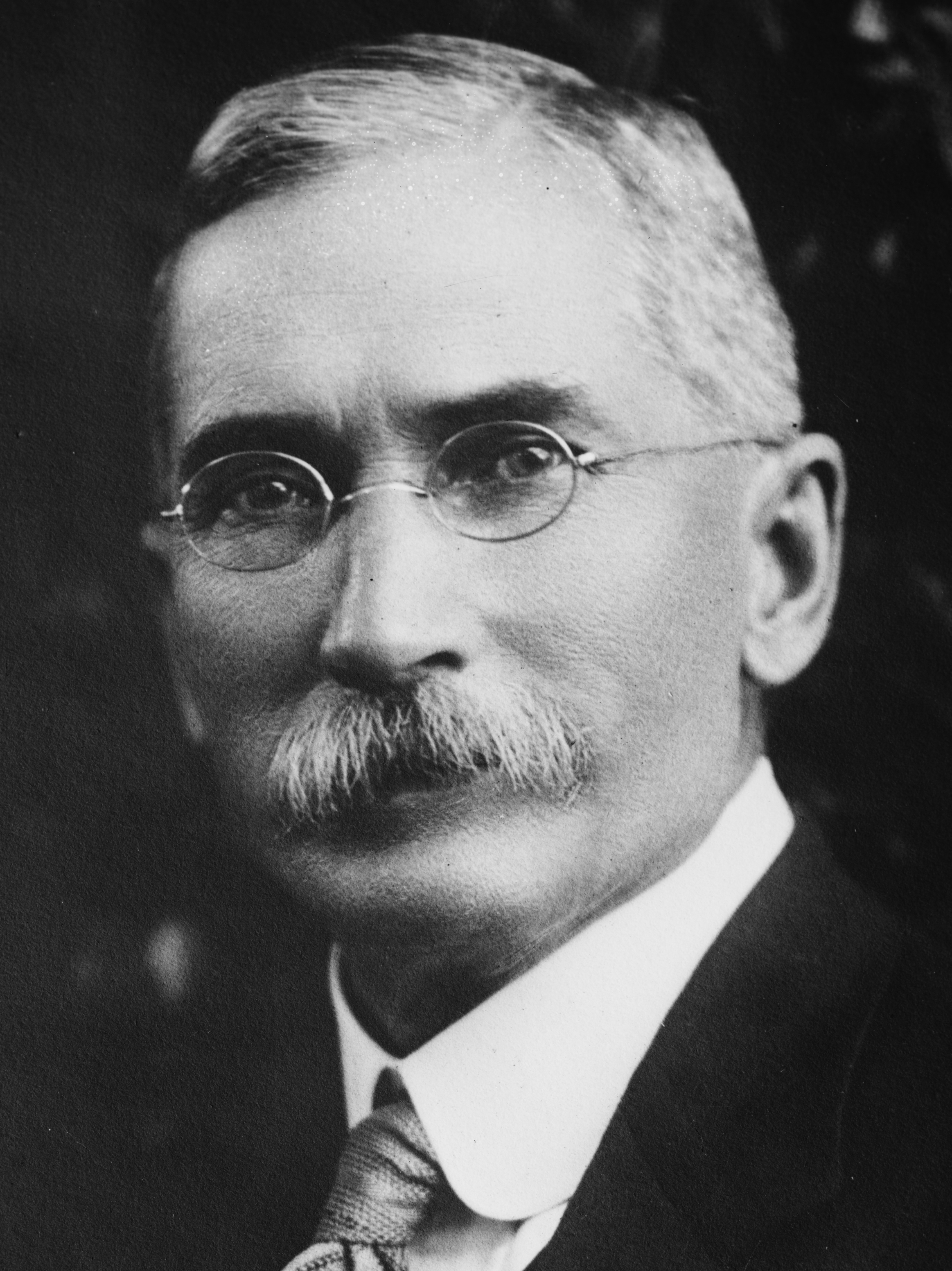

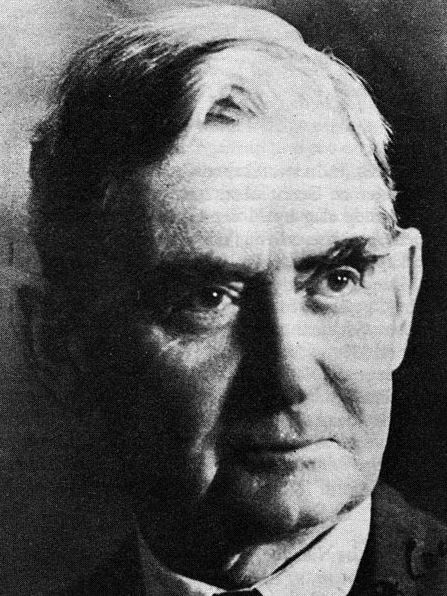
	First party	Second party	Third party
Leader	Jan Smuts	J. B. M. Hertzog	Frederic Creswell
Party	South African	National	Labour
Leader's seat	Pretoria West	Smithfield	Troyeville (lost re-election)
Last election	50.51%, 66 seats (Note: South African Party and Unionist Party combined.)	32.62%, 43 seats	14.65%, 21 seats
Seats won	77	44	10
Seat change	▲11	▲1	▼11
Popular vote	137,389	105,039	29,406
Percentage	49.90%	38.15%	10.68%
Swing	▼0.61pp	▲5.53pp	▼3.97pp
- Results by province
Prime Minister before election
Jan Smuts
South African
Elected Prime Minister
Jan Smuts
South African

This is a list of constituency results for the 1921 South African general election.

== Boundary changes ==
The 1921 general election was a snap election, held less than a year after the 1920 general election. As such, unusually for early South African elections, no constituency delimitation was carried out and the 1921 election was held on the same set of boundaries as the previous one.

Province	Number of seats
Cape	51
Natal	17
Orange Free State	17
Transvaal	49
Total	134

== Cape Province ==
Party	Votes	%	Seats
South African Party	71,560	55.84	36
National Party	43,436	33.89	13
Labour Party	10,384	8.10	1
Liberal-Labour	62	0.05	0
Constitutional Democrat			1
Independent South African Party	1,122	0.88	0
Independents	1,594	1.24	0
Total	128,158	100.00	51
Source: Schoeman

Unopposed candidates: SAP 3, Constitutional Democrat 1.

=== Albany ===
General election 1921: Albany
Party	Candidate	Votes	%	±%
South African	Frederick John Werndly van der Riet	Unopposed		
South African hold				

=== Albert-Aliwal ===
General election 1921: Albert-Aliwal
Party	Candidate	Votes	%	±%
South African	Charles Arthur Augustus Sephton	1,785	52.5	+2.9
National	Louis Petrus Vorster	1,613	47.5	−2.9
Majority		172	0.6	N/A
Turnout		3,398	78.9	+3.1
South African gain from National		Swing	+2.9	

=== Barkly ===
General election 1921: Barkly
Party	Candidate	Votes	%	±%
South African	Pieter Ernst Scholtz	1,507	50.9	+33.0
National	Wilhelm Bruckner de Villiers	1,450	49.1	+0.2
Majority		57	0.6	N/A
Turnout		2,957	77.2	+6.4
South African gain from National		Swing	+16.6	

=== Beaconsfield ===
General election 1921: Beaconsfield
Party	Candidate	Votes	%	±%
South African	David Harris	Unopposed		
South African hold				

=== Beaufort West ===
General election 1921: Beaufort West
Party	Candidate	Votes	%	±%
National	Pieter Wynand le Roux	1,605	51.5	−10.0
South African	Mathys Gustaf de Jager	1,512	48.5	+10.0
Majority		93	3.0	−20.0
Turnout		3,117	82.6	+6.5
National hold		Swing	-10.0	

=== Bechuanaland ===
General election 1921: Bechuanaland
Party	Candidate	Votes	%	±%
National	Ignatius van Wijk Raubenheimer	1,365	50.7	+2.3
South African	Max Sonnenberg	1,327	49.3	−2.3
Majority		38	1.4	N/A
Turnout		2,692	72.7	−0.8
National gain from South African		Swing	+2.3	

=== Border ===
General election 1921: Border
Party	Candidate	Votes	%	±%
South African	John Joseph Byron	1,373	78.8	New
Independent	Helier Brohier Cuming	370	21.2	New
Majority		1,003	57.6	N/A
Turnout		1,743	45.9	−13.8
South African hold		Swing	N/A	

=== Caledon ===
General election 1921: Caledon
Party	Candidate	Votes	%	±%
South African	Christman Joel Krige	1,833	62.5	+2.7
National	Petrus Johannes Cillié	1,102	37.5	−2.7
Majority		731	25.0	+5.4
Turnout		2,935	80.7	+0.5
South African hold		Swing	+2.7	

=== Calvinia ===
General election 1921: Calvinia
Party	Candidate	Votes	%	±%
National	Daniël François Malan	1,541	61.1	+1.1
South African	Jacobus Alwyn van der Merwe	981	38.9	−1.1
Majority		560	22.2	+2.2
Turnout		2,522	70.6	−5.6
National hold		Swing	+1.1	

=== Cape Town Castle ===
General election 1921: Cape Town Castle
Party	Candidate	Votes	%	±%
Constitutional Democrat	Morris Alexander	Unopposed		
Constitutional Democrat hold				

=== Cape Town Central ===
General election 1921: Cape Town Central
Party	Candidate	Votes	%	±%
South African	John William Jagger	2,057	80.0	+15.9
Labour	Harry Maurice Fridjohn	515	20.0	−15.9
Majority		727	60.0	+31.8
Turnout		2,572	58.4	−1.8
South African hold		Swing	+15.9	

=== Cape Town Gardens ===
General election 1921: Cape Town Gardens
Party	Candidate	Votes	%	±%
South African	George William Hawley	1,935	68.4	New
Labour	Robert Forsyth	896	31.6	−24.1
Majority		1,039	36.8	N/A
Turnout		2,831	65.6	+7.3
South African gain from Labour		Swing	N/A	

=== Cape Town Harbour ===
General election 1921: Cape Town Harbour
Party	Candidate	Votes	%	±%
South African	Gideon Brand van Zyl	1,754	70.9	+17.6
Labour	Albert Francis Betty	719	29.1	−17.6
Majority		1,035	41.8	+35.2
Turnout		2,473	55.4	+1.7
South African hold		Swing	+17.6	

=== Ceres ===
General election 1921: Ceres
Party	Candidate	Votes	%	±%
National	Johannes Wilhelmus Jacobus Wessel Roux	1,651	55.8	+−0
South African	Daniel Pieter Stephanus Brink	1,308	44.2	+−0
Majority		343	11.6	+−0
Turnout		2,959	80.0	−4.9
National hold		Swing	+-0	

=== Colesberg ===
General election 1921: Colesberg
Party	Candidate	Votes	%	±%
South African	George Albert Louw	1,788	55.1	+9.1
National	Diederick Johannes Jooste	1,458	44.9	−0.9
Majority		330	10.2	+10.0
Turnout		3,246	77.3	+0.6
South African hold		Swing	+5.0	

=== Cradock ===
General election 1921: Cradock
Party	Candidate	Votes	%	±%
National	Isaac Petrus van Heerden	1,605	51.5	−0.2
South African	Antoine Charles Auguste van Rooy	1,512	48.5	+0.2
Majority		93	3.0	−0.4
Turnout		3,246	77.3	−1.5
National hold		Swing	-0.2	

=== East London ===
General election 1921: East London
Party	Candidate	Votes	%	±%
South African	Charles James Lownds	1,493	50.7	+1.3
Labour	James Stewart	1,454	49.3	−1.3
Majority		39	1.4	N/A
Turnout		2,947	70.2	+1.9
South African gain from Labour		Swing	+1.3	

=== Fort Beaufort ===
General election 1921: Fort Beaufort
Party	Candidate	Votes	%	±%
South African	Thomas William Smartt	1,569	64.1	N/A
National	Gerhardus Hendick Izak Rood	877	35.9	New
Majority		692	28.2	N/A
Turnout		2,446	69.9	N/A
South African hold		Swing	N/A	

=== George ===
General election 1921: George
Party	Candidate	Votes	%	±%
National	George Frederick Brink	1,612	52.0	+1.7
South African	Thomas Searle	1,488	48.0	−1.7
Majority		124	4.0	+3.4
Turnout		3,100	80.9	+1.5
National hold		Swing	+1.7	

=== Graaff-Reinet ===
General election 1921: Graaff-Reinet
Party	Candidate	Votes	%	±%
National	Johan Martin Enslin	1,457	59.0	+0.1
South African	Walter Rubidge	1,013	41.0	−0.1
Majority		444	18.0	+0.2
Turnout		2,470	68.3	−3.9
National hold		Swing	+0.1	

=== Griqualand ===
General election 1921: Griqualand
Party	Candidate	Votes	%	±%
South African	John Gavin King	1,731	79.0	+29.8
National	Thomas Ignatius Gavett	459	21.0	New
Majority		1,272	58.0	N/A
Turnout		2,190	62.3	+7.7
South African hold		Swing	N/A	

=== Hopetown ===
General election 1921: Hopetown
Party	Candidate	Votes	%	±%
South African	Petrus Stephanus Cilliers	1,562	54.8	+2.1
National	Pieter Gerhardus Marais	1,290	45.2	−2.1
Majority		272	9.6	+4.2
Turnout		2,852	77.2	+2.4
South African hold		Swing	+2.1	

=== Humansdorp ===
General election 1921: Humansdorp
Party	Candidate	Votes	%	±%
National	Charl Wynand Malan	1,674	59.3	+0.4
South African	Ignatius Wilhelm Barnardt	1,150	40.7	−0.4
Majority		512	18.6	+0.8
Turnout		2,824	62.0	−22.3
National hold		Swing	+0.4	

=== Kimberley ===
General election 1921: Kimberley
Party	Candidate	Votes	%	±%
South African	Henry Alfred Oliver	1,557	61.5	+0.3
Labour	Jeremiah Wills	976	38.5	+6.6
Majority		581	23.0	−6.3
Turnout		2,533	64.3	−2.0
South African hold		Swing	-3.2	

=== King William's Town ===
General election 1921: King William's Town
Party	Candidate	Votes	%	±%
South African	Robert Ballantine	1,331	49.6	New
Independent	Carl Hermann Malcomess	805	30.0	New
Labour	John Carver	416	15.5	−23.9
Labour	Thomas Crankshaw	133	5.0	New
Majority		512	19.6	N/A
Turnout		2,685	70.4	+4.6
South African gain from Independent		Swing	N/A	

=== Ladismith ===
General election 1921: Ladismith
Party	Candidate	Votes	%	±%
South African	Paul Jacobus Jordaan	1,585	50.4	−2.7
National	Johannes Jacobus Marthinus van Zyl	1,559	49.6	+2.7
Majority		26	0.8	−5.4
Turnout		3,144	86.6	−1.7
South African hold		Swing	-2.7	

=== Liesbeek ===
General election 1921: Liesbeek
Party	Candidate	Votes	%	±%
South African	James Wellwood Mushet	1,206	51.6	+13.0
Labour	Charles Pearce	1,106	47.3	+11.2
Liberal-Labour	Albert William Patrick Mullany	25	1.1	New
Majority		100	4.3	N/A
Turnout		2,337	55.5	+3.4
South African hold		Swing	+1.8	

=== Malmesbury ===
General election 1921: Malmesbury
Party	Candidate	Votes	%	±%
South African	François Stephanus Malan	1,756	55.1	−1.7
National	Stephanus François Malan	1,431	44.9	New
Majority		325	10.2	N/A
Turnout		3,187	83.9	+1.7
South African hold		Swing	N/A	

=== Namaqualand ===
General election 1921: Namaqualand
Party	Candidate	Votes	%	±%
National	Jacobus Petrus Mostert	1,481	69.7	+3.4
South African	Egidius Benedictus Watermeyer	643	30.3	−3.4
Majority		718	39.4	+6.8
Turnout		2,124	61.2	−4.5
National hold		Swing	+3.4	

=== Newlands ===
General election 1921: Newlands
Party	Candidate	Votes	%	±%
South African	William Porter Buchanan	1,844	77.7	+12.9
Labour	John Lomax	528	22.3	−12.9
Majority		1,316	55.4	+25.8
Turnout		2,372	55.5	+−0
South African hold		Swing	+12.9	

=== Oudtshoorn ===
General election 1921: Oudtshoorn
Party	Candidate	Votes	%	±%
South African	Jan Abraham Raubenheimer	1,668	51.8	+5.7
National	Cornelis Jacobus Langenhoven	1,553	48.2	−5.7
Majority		115	3.6	N/A
Turnout		3,221	77.4	−0.6
South African gain from National		Swing	+5.7	

=== Paarl ===
General election 1921: Paarl
Party	Candidate	Votes	%	±%
South African	Adries Lourens de Jager	1,925	59.9	+1.9
National	François Gerhardus Wiid Roux	1,289	40.1	+1.8
Majority		636	19.8	+0.1
Turnout		3,214	77.8	−3.6
South African hold		Swing	+0.1	

=== Piketberg ===
General election 1921: Piketberg
Party	Candidate	Votes	%	±%
National	Jan Hendrik Hofmeyr de Waal	1,684	56.3	−4.5
South African	François Allen Joubert	1,309	43.7	+4.5
Majority		618	12.6	−9.0
Turnout		2,993	80.2	+0.8
National hold		Swing	+4.5	

=== Port Elizabeth Central ===
General election 1921: Port Elizabeth Central
Party	Candidate	Votes	%	±%
South African	Edgar Harris Walton	1,583	80.8	+11.2
Labour	Arthur Eaton	377	19.2	−11.2
Majority		1,206	61.6	+22.4
Turnout		1,960	47.0	−2.8
South African hold		Swing	+11.2	

=== Port Elizabeth Southwest ===
General election 1921: Port Elizabeth Southwest
Party	Candidate	Votes	%	±%
South African	William Macintosh	1,853	78.0	+7.9
Labour	William Wardley Jennings	523	22.0	−7.9
Majority		1,330	56.0	+15.8
Turnout		2,376	56.5	−5.0
South African hold		Swing	+7.9	

=== Prieska ===
General election 1921: Prieska
Party	Candidate	Votes	%	±%
South African	Jan Paul Coetzee	1,501	50.3	+1.1
National	Johannes Hendrik Conradie	1,483	49.7	−1.1
Majority		18	0.6	N/A
Turnout		2,984	78.9	+5.2
South African gain from National		Swing	+1.1	

=== Queenstown ===
General election 1921: Queenstown
Party	Candidate	Votes	%	±%
South African	Arthur Henry Frost	1,843	62.5	+7.1
National	Eric Hendrik Louw	1,105	37.5	+5.9
Majority		738	25.0	+1.2
Turnout		2,948	72.5	−2.7
South African hold		Swing	+0.6	

=== Riversdale ===
General election 1921: Riversdale
Party	Candidate	Votes	%	±%
National	Adrian Lodewicus Badenhorst	1,708	50.0	+0.6
South African	Jan Johan Michau	1,707	50.0	−0.6
Majority		1	0.0	N/A
Turnout		3,415	86.1	−4.2
National gain from South African		Swing	+0.6	

=== Rondebosch ===
General election 1921: Rondebosch
Party	Candidate	Votes	%	±%
South African	Ralph William Close	1,637	79.1	+14.1
Labour	Joseph Seddon	433	20.9	−14.1
Majority		1,204	58.2	+28.2
Turnout		2,070	50.0	+3.4
South African hold		Swing	+14.1	

=== Salt River ===
General election 1921: Salt River
Party	Candidate	Votes	%	±%
Labour	Walter John Snow	1,187	59.2	−7.0
South African	Allister Mackintosh Miller	780	38.9	New
Independent	Charles Henry Hagger	37	1.8	New
Majority		407	20.3	N/A
Turnout		2,004	48.3	−6.3
Labour hold		Swing	N/A	

=== Somerset ===
General election 1921: Somerset
Party	Candidate	Votes	%	±%
National	Adriaan Paulus Johannes Fourie	1,631	54.7	−1.9
South African	Petrus Jacobus Johannes Coetzee	1,351	45.3	+1.9
Majority		280	9.4	−3.8
Turnout		2,982	78.1	−1.5
National hold		Swing	-1.9	

=== South Peninsula ===
General election 1921: South Peninsula
Party	Candidate	Votes	%	±%
South African	Murray Bisset	1,469	77.8	+9.8
Independent	Willem Hendrik Lategan	419	22.2	+8.3
Majority		1,050	55.6	N/A
Turnout		1,888	46.7	+0.8
South African hold		Swing	N/A	

=== Stellenbosch ===
General election 1921: Stellenbosch
Party	Candidate	Votes	%	±%
South African	John Xavier Merriman	Unopposed		
South African hold				

=== Swellendam ===
General election 1921: Swellendam
Party	Candidate	Votes	%	±%
South African	Jacobus Willem van Eeden	1,583	57.3	−2.9
National	Jacobus Hendrik Coetzee	1,141	41.3	+2.4
Independent	Alfred John Barry	17	0.6	New
Rejected ballots		22	0.8	N/A
Majority		442	16.0	−5.3
Turnout		2,763	77.9	+3.0
South African hold		Swing	-2.6	

=== Tembuland ===
General election 1921: Tembuland
Party	Candidate	Votes	%	±%
South African	William Hemming Stuart	1,133	50.2	−4.1
Ind. South African	Alfred Owen Balleine Payn	1,122	49.8	New
Majority		11	0.4	N/A
Turnout		2,255	63.1	−2.0
South African hold		Swing	N/A	

=== Three Rivers ===
General election 1921: Three Rivers
Party	Candidate	Votes	%	±%
South African	Daniel Maclaren Brown	1,576	67.3	+6.7
National	Karl Bremer	532	22.7	New
Labour	William Thomas Fowler	234	10.0	New
Majority		571	44.6	N/A
Turnout		2,342	59.6	+4.0
South African hold		Swing	N/A	

=== Uitenhage ===
General election 1921: Uitenhage
Party	Candidate	Votes	%	±%
South African	William Richardson Burch	2,046	56.9	+3.7
National	Okkert Almero Oosthuizen	1,551	43.1	−3.7
Majority		495	13.8	+7.4
Turnout		3,597	79.7	−1.9
South African hold		Swing	+3.7	

=== Victoria West ===
General election 1921: Victoria West
Party	Candidate	Votes	%	±%
National	François Jacobus du Toit	1,526	50.1	−2.7
South African	Hendrik Johannes Nel	1,521	49.9	+2.7
Majority		5	0.2	−5.4
Turnout		3,047	82.8	−2.7
National hold		Swing	+2.7	

=== Wodehouse ===
General election 1921: Wodehouse
Party	Candidate	Votes	%	±%
South African	Jan Abraham Venter	1,636	50.9	+1.5
National	Octavius Septimus Vermooten	1,574	49.1	−1.5
Majority		62	1.8	N/A
Turnout		3,210	80.7	−1.5
South African gain from National		Swing	+1.5	

=== Woodstock ===
General election 1921: Woodstock
Party	Candidate	Votes	%	±%
South African	Isaac Purcell	1,124	55.9	+36.4
Labour	Jacob Frank	887	44.1	−9.8
Majority		237	11.8	N/A
Turnout		2,011	46.3	−11.9
South African gain from Labour		Swing	+23.1	

=== Worcester ===
General election 1921: Worcester
Party	Candidate	Votes	%	±%
South African	Charles Beeton Heatlie	1,915	57.3	+0.2
National	Albert Jacobus Stals	1,429	42.7	−0.2
Majority		486	14.6	+0.4
Turnout		3,344	83.7	+0.1
South African hold		Swing	+0.2	

== Natal ==
Party	Votes	%	Seats
South African Party	11,845	59.63	14
Labour Party	4,751	23.92	1
National Party	3,062	15.42	1
Independents	205	1.03	0
Total	19,863	100.00	16
Source: Schoeman

Unopposed candidates: SAP 3.

=== Dundee ===
General election 1921: Dundee
Party	Candidate	Votes	%	±%
South African	Thomas Watt	771	66.4	+35.5
National	Jurie Johannes Kemp	391	33.6	+9.3
Majority		17	32.8	N/A
Turnout		1,162	60.1	−7.0
South African hold		Swing	+15.7	

=== Durban Berea ===
General election 1921: Durban Berea
Party	Candidate	Votes	%	±%
South African	James Henderson	1,025	75.7	+10.7
Labour	Francis Joseph Fahey	329	24.3	−10.7
Majority		696	51.4	+21.4
Turnout		1,354	52.0	+1.1
South African hold		Swing	+10.7	

=== Durban Central ===
General election 1921: Durban Central
Party	Candidate	Votes	%	±%
South African	Charles Phineas Robinson	804	54.7	New
Labour	John William Coleman	645	43.9	−19.3
Independent	Thomas Horn Baird	21	1.4	New
Majority		159	10.8	N/A
Turnout		1,470	58.1	+3.0
South African gain from Labour		Swing	N/A	

=== Durban Greyville ===
General election 1921: Durban Greyville
Party	Candidate	Votes	%	±%
Labour	Thomas Boydell	920	63.6	−15.3
South African	George Mitchell	501	34.6	New
Independent	Robert Rodger	25	1.7	New
Majority		419	29.0	N/A
Turnout		1,446	57.1	−1.9
Labour hold		Swing	N/A	

=== Durban Point ===
General election 1921: Durban Point
Party	Candidate	Votes	%	±%
South African	Walter Greenacre	1,069	54.4	+10.1
Labour	Archibald Jamieson	745	37.9	−11.3
Independent	Sofus Maurits Pettersen	94	4.8	New
Independent	Percy Arthur Silburn	58	3.0	New
Majority		324	16.5	N/A
Turnout		1,966	60.5	−5.1
South African gain from Labour		Swing	+10.7	

=== Durban Stamford Hill ===
General election 1921: Durban Stamford Hill
Party	Candidate	Votes	%	±%
South African	John George Hunter	1,021	62.9	+12.2
Labour	Herbert Henry Kemp	602	37.1	−12.2
Majority		419	25.8	+24.4
Turnout		1,623	60.0	+4.5
South African hold		Swing	+12.2	

=== Durban Umbilo ===
General election 1921: Durban Umbilo
Party	Candidate	Votes	%	±%
South African	Harold Graham Mackeurtan	1,008	57.1	New
Labour	Frank Nettleton	758	42.9	−19.8
Majority		250	14.2	N/A
Turnout		1,766	69.4	+4.2
South African gain from Labour		Swing	N/A	

=== Illovo ===
General election 1921: Illovo
Party	Candidate	Votes	%	±%
South African	John Sydney Marwick	Unopposed		
South African hold				

=== Klip River ===
General election 1921: Klip River
Party	Candidate	Votes	%	±%
South African	Henry Burton	909	67.1	+7.6
National	Peregrene William Joynt	446	32.9	+4.8
Majority		463	34.2	+2.8
Turnout		1,355	67.1	−4.0
South African hold		Swing	+1.4	

=== Natal Coast ===
General election 1921: Natal Coast
Party	Candidate	Votes	%	±%
South African	Edward George A. Saunders	Unopposed		
South African hold				

=== Newcastle ===
General election 1921: Newcastle
Party	Candidate	Votes	%	±%
South African	Theunis Jacobus Nel	715	53.7	−0.5
National	Joseph Jurgens Muller	616	46.3	+0.5
Majority		99	7.4	−1.0
Turnout		1,331	72.6	−1.2
South African hold		Swing	-0.5	

=== Pietermaritzburg North ===
General election 1921: Pietermaritzburg North
Party	Candidate	Votes	%	±%
Labour	Thomas Gillately Strachan	752	50.4	−11.2
South African	William Arthur Deane	740	49.6	+11.2
Majority		12	0.8	−22.4
Turnout		1,492	66.9	−0.1
Labour gain from		Swing	-11.2	

=== Pietermaritzburg South ===
General election 1921: Pietermaritzburg South
Party	Candidate	Votes	%	±%
South African	William John O'Brien	Unopposed		
South African hold				

=== Umvoti ===
General election 1921: Umvoti
Party	Candidate	Votes	%	±%
South African	George Leuchars	788	62.8	+3.1
National	Adrian Izak Johannes Nel	459	36.6	−3.7
Independent	William Truscott Tonkin	7	0.6	New
Majority		329	26.2	+6.8
Turnout		1,254	66.8	+0.1
South African hold		Swing	+3.4	

=== Vryheid ===
General election 1921: Vryheid
Party	Candidate	Votes	%	±%
National	Ernest George Jansen	765	50.1	+2.8
South African	Joseph James Cheere Emmett	762	49.9	−2.8
Majority		3	0.2	N/A
Turnout		1,527	79.7	+0.7
National gain from South African		Swing	+2.8	

=== Weenen ===
General election 1921: Weenen
Party	Candidate	Votes	%	±%
South African	John William Moor	812	79.6	+27.5
National	Charel Gustav Martins	208	20.4	New
Majority		171	59.2	N/A
Turnout		1,020	53.6	−4.8
South African hold		Swing	N/A	

=== Zululand ===
General election 1921: Zululand
Party	Candidate	Votes	%	±%
South African	George Heaton Nicholls	920	83.9	+1.1
National	William Henry Harris	177	16.1	−1.1
Majority		743	67.8	+2.2
Turnout		1,097	55.5	−3.7
South African hold		Swing	+1.1	

== Orange Free State ==
Party	Votes	%	Seats
National Party	21,750	68.07	16
South African Party	8,955	28.03	0
Labour Party	1,246	3.90	1
Total	31,951	100.00	17
Source: Schoeman

Unopposed candidates: National 1.

=== Bethlehem ===
General election 1921: Bethlehem
Party	Candidate	Votes	%	±%
National	Johannes Henricus Brand Wessels	1,467	70.1	+1.8
South African	Eduard Christiaan Daniel Roos	625	29.9	−1.8
Majority		842	40.2	+3.6
Turnout		2,092	66.6	−4.0
National hold		Swing	+1.8	

=== Bloemfontein North ===
General election 1921: Bloemfontein North
Party	Candidate	Votes	%	±%
Labour	Arthur Godfrey Barlow	1,246	57.3	+28.5
National	Johannes Wilhelmus Gysbert Steyn	930	42.7	−0.4
Majority		316	14.6	N/A
Turnout		2,176	66.4	−0.1
Labour gain from National		Swing	+14.1	

=== Bloemfontein South ===
General election 1921: Bloemfontein South
Party	Candidate	Votes	%	±%
National	Colin Fraser Steyn	1,189	51.0	+3.8
South African	Deneys Reitz	1,142	49.0	−3.8
Majority		47	2.0	N/A
Turnout		2,331	70.1	+10.4
National gain from		Swing	+3.8	

=== Boshof ===
General election 1921: Boshof
Party	Candidate	Votes	%	±%
National	Christiaan Andries van Niekerk	1,618	86.7	+0.8
South African	Hendrik Gerhardus Vivier	248	13.3	−0.8
Majority		1,370	73.4	+1.6
Turnout		1,866	64.9	−0.4
National hold		Swing	+0.8	

=== Edenburg ===
General election 1921: Edenburg
Party	Candidate	Votes	%	±%
National	Fredrik William Beyers	1,300	77.0	+1.2
South African	Christoffel Jacobus Visser	388	23.0	−1.2
Majority		912	54.0	+2.4
Turnout		1,688	60.0	−2.9
National hold		Swing	+1.2	

=== Fauresmith ===
General election 1921: Fauresmith
Party	Candidate	Votes	%	±%
National	Nicolaas Christiaan Havenga	1,476	74.1	+4.6
South African	Nicolaas François van der Merwe	515	25.9	−4.6
Majority		961	48.2	+9.2
Turnout		1,991	66.3	−4.9
National hold		Swing	+4.6	

=== Ficksburg ===
General election 1921: Ficksburg
Party	Candidate	Votes	%	±%
National	Jan Gerhard Keyter	1,551	77.7	+2.9
South African	Pieter Jan Frederik Krog	446	22.3	−2.9
Majority		1,105	55.4	+5.8
Turnout		1,997	64.8	+1.2
National hold		Swing	+2.9	

=== Frankfort ===
General election 1921: Frankfort
Party	Candidate	Votes	%	±%
National	Joahnnes Bernardus Wessels	1,351	68.1	+0.7
South African	Hermanus Nicolaas Wilhelm Botha	632	31.9	−0.7
Majority		719	36.2	+1.4
Turnout		1,983	63.7	−4.4
National hold		Swing	+0.7	

=== Harrismith ===
General election 1921: Harrismith
Party	Candidate	Votes	%	±%
National	Abraham Albertus Cilliers	1,394	65.2	+1.1
South African	Matthys Johannes Beukes	743	34.8	−1.1
Majority		651	30.4	+2.2
Turnout		2,137	68.9	−0.6
National hold		Swing	+1.1	

=== Heilbron ===
General election 1921: Heilbron
Party	Candidate	Votes	%	±%
National	Marthinus Lourens Malan	1,503	72.4	+2.5
South African	Louis Jacobus Naudé	572	27.6	−2.5
Majority		931	44.8	+5.0
Turnout		2,075	65.1	−4.6
National hold		Swing	+2.5	

=== Hoopstad ===
General election 1921: Hoopstad
Party	Candidate	Votes	%	±%
National	Edwin Alfred Conroy	1,280	69.3	+1.2
South African	Hendrik Schalk Theron	567	30.7	−1.2
Majority		615	38.6	+2.4
Turnout		1,847	64.3	+2.1
National hold		Swing	+1.2	

=== Kroonstad ===
General election 1921: Kroonstad
Party	Candidate	Votes	%	±%
National	Albertus Johannes Werth	1,383	62.0	+−0
South African	Henri George Stuart	849	38.0	+−0
Majority		534	24.0	+−0
Turnout		2,232	73.2	−3.2
National hold		Swing	+-0	

=== Ladybrand ===
General election 1921: Ladybrand
Party	Candidate	Votes	%	±%
National	Charles Gustav Fichardt	1,268	65.6	+4.9
South African	Esaias Reinier Grobler	664	34.4	−4.9
Majority		380	31.2	+9.8
Turnout		1,932	63.2	−1.0
National hold		Swing	+4.9	

=== Rouxville ===
General election 1921: Rouxville
Party	Candidate	Votes	%	±%
National	Daniël Hugo	1,389	76.4	+1.1
South African	George Louis Steytler	428	23.6	−1.1
Majority		961	52.8	+2.2
Turnout		1,817	60.0	−2.1
National hold		Swing	+1.1	

=== Smithfield ===
General election 1921: Smithfield
Party	Candidate	Votes	%	±%
National	James Barry Munnik Hertzog	Unopposed		
National hold				

=== Vredefort ===
General election 1921: Vredefort
Party	Candidate	Votes	%	±%
National	Colin Fraser Steyn	1,270	70.3	+5.0
South African	Gert Hendrik Claassens	537	29.7	−5.0
Majority		733	40.6	+10.0
Turnout		1,807	59.4	−3.7
National hold		Swing	+5.0	

Steyn was elected both in Vredefort and Bloemfontein South, and chose to represent Bloemfontein South.

=== Winburg ===
General election 1921: Winburg
Party	Candidate	Votes	%	±%
National	Carl Theodorus Muller Wilcocks	1,381	69.7	+1.4
South African	Frederick Reinhardt Cronjé	599	30.3	−1.4
Majority		782	39.4	+2.8
Turnout		1,980	65.7	−3.6
National hold		Swing	+1.4	

== Transvaal ==
Party	Votes	%	Seats
South African Party	45,324	47.47	29
National Party	35,874	37.57	13
Labour Party	13,203	13.83	5
Independents	1,087	1.14	0
Total	95,488	100.00	47
Source: Schoeman

Unopposed candidates: SAP 3, Labour 1.

=== Barberton ===
General election 1921: Barberton
Party	Candidate	Votes	%	±%
South African	Joachim Christoffel Fourie	1,153	56.8	+1.3
National	Johannes Lodewicus Malan	876	43.2	−1.3
Majority		277	13.6	+2.6
Turnout		2,029	64.8	+1.6
South African hold		Swing	+1.3	

=== Benoni ===
General election 1921: Benoni
Party	Candidate	Votes	%	±%
Labour	Walter Bayley Madeley	1,233	63.1	+11.9
National	Hendrik Petrus Venter	721	36.9	+6.8
Majority		512	26.2	+5.1
Turnout		1,954	59.2	−1.6
Labour hold		Swing	+2.6	

=== Bethal ===
General election 1921: Bethal
Party	Candidate	Votes	%	±%
South African	Hendrik Stephanus Grobler	1,182	57.5	−3.1
National	Charles Steven Raath	875	42.5	+3.1
Majority		307	15.0	−6.2
Turnout		2,057	64.7	+4.3
South African hold		Swing	-3.1	

=== Bezuidenhout ===
General election 1921: Bezuidenhout
Party	Candidate	Votes	%	±%
South African	Leslie Blackwell	1,222	57.8	+18.8
Labour	William James McIntyre	892	42.2	−7.5
Majority		230	15.6	N/A
Turnout		2,114	66.3	−1.3
South African gain from Labour		Swing	+12.3	

=== Boksburg ===
General election 1921: Boksburg
Party	Candidate	Votes	%	±%
South African	Robert Hugh Henderson	1,059	50.0	New
Labour	John Joseph McMenamin	686	32.4	−7.8
National	Pieter Frederick Anderson	374	17.7	−2.7
Majority		373	17.6	N/A
Turnout		2,119	63.7	−0.8
South African gain from Labour		Swing	N/A	

=== Brakpan ===
General election 1921: Brakpan
Party	Candidate	Votes	%	±%
Labour	Robert Burns Waterston	1,326	50.2	+15.2
National	John Henry Munnik	1,314	49.8	−0.4
Majority		12	0.4	N/A
Turnout		2,640	69.7	−1.5
Labour gain from National		Swing	+7.8	

=== Christiana ===
General election 1921: Christiana
Party	Candidate	Votes	%	±%
National	Albert Strancham van Hees	1,368	68.2	+1.8
South African	Filippus Fourie Pienaar	639	31.8	−0.3
Majority		610	36.4	+2.1
Turnout		2,007	61.5	−3.6
National hold		Swing	+1.1	

=== Commissioner Street ===
General election 1921: Commissioner Street
Party	Candidate	Votes	%	±%
South African	Harry Graumann	1,181	62.4	+15.5
Labour	John Henry Scott Gow	713	37.6	−12.1
Majority		468	24.8	N/A
Turnout		1,894	60.6	+5.3
South African gain from Labour		Swing	+13.8	

=== Denver ===
General election 1921: Denver
Party	Candidate	Votes	%	±%
South African	Charles Eugene Nixon	961	42.9	+12.7
Labour	Thomas Edgar Drew	696	31.0	−14.2
National	Jeremias Jesias Bouwer Pohl	585	26.1	+1.6
Majority		265	11.9	N/A
Turnout		2,242	68.2	−1.6
South African gain from Labour		Swing	+13.5	

=== Ermelo ===
General election 1921: Ermelo
Party	Candidate	Votes	%	±%
South African	William Richard Collins	1,367	60.6	−1.0
National	Wellem Adolph Joubert	889	39.4	+1.0
Majority		478	23.2	−2.0
Turnout		2,256	73.8	+0.8
South African hold		Swing	-1.0	

=== Fordsburg ===
General election 1921: Fordsburg
Party	Candidate	Votes	%	±%
National	Jacobus Stephanus François Pretorius	729	37.9	+4.6
Labour	Morris Kentridge	647	33.6	−11.6
South African	Hugh Hunter McLean	549	28.5	New
Majority		82	4.3	N/A
Turnout		1,925	55.9	+2.7
National gain from Labour		Swing	+8.1	

=== Germiston ===
General election 1921: Germiston
Party	Candidate	Votes	%	±%
South African	Hugh Steward McAlister	1,039	39.6	+12.2
National	Henry Harris Moll	996	37.9	+2.4
Labour	George Brown	592	22.5	−14.5
Majority		43	1.7	N/A
Turnout		2,627	71.1	+1.4
South African gain from Labour		Swing	N/A	

=== Heidelberg ===
General election 1921: Heidelberg
Party	Candidate	Votes	%	±%
South African	Willem Wouter Jacobus Johannes Bezuidenhout	1,073	52.8	+1.7
National	Servaas Daniel de Wet	959	47.2	+10.0
Majority		750	5.6	−8.3
Turnout		2,032	62.5	−1.7
South African hold		Swing	-4.2	

=== Hospital ===
General election 1921: Hospital
Party	Candidate	Votes	%	±%
South African	Herbert Boshof Papenfus	1,412	68.5	+33.1
National	Robert Lizars Weir	648	31.5	+14.4
Majority		764	37.0	N/A
Turnout		2,060	62.5	−3.1
South African hold		Swing	N/A	

=== Jeppes ===
General election 1921: Jeppes
Party	Candidate	Votes	%	±%
Labour	Henry William Sampson	Unopposed		
Labour hold				

=== Johannesburg North ===
General election 1921: Johannesburg North
Party	Candidate	Votes	%	±%
South African	Lourens Geldenhuys	1,215	60.4	+28.0
National	Ignatius Michael Rautenbach	797	39.6	+14.5
Majority		418	20.8	N/A
Turnout		2,012	64.9	+0.5
South African hold		Swing	N/A	

=== Klerksdorp ===
General election 1921: Klerksdorp
Party	Candidate	Votes	%	±%
National	Jacobus Stephanus Smit	1,408	53.2	−0.7
South African	Johannes Adriaan Nesser	1,239	46.8	+0.7
Majority		169	6.4	−1.4
Turnout		2,647	77.7	−2.8
National hold		Swing	-0.7	

=== Krugersdorp ===
General election 1921: Krugersdorp
Party	Candidate	Votes	%	±%
Independent	Abe Bailey	1,158	44.5	+7.1
National	Bernhardus Rudolf Hattingh	1,022	39.3	+2.9
Labour	Edward Cresswell	420	16.2	−10.0
Majority		136	5.2	+4.2
Turnout		2,600	74.6	+0.1
Independent hold		Swing	+2.1	

=== Langlaagte ===
General election 1921: Langlaagte
Party	Candidate	Votes	%	±%
Labour	John Christie	1,036	52.4	+17.9
South African	Willie Rockey	940	47.6	+7.6
Majority		96	4.8	N/A
Turnout		1,976	62.6	+0.9
Labour gain from Unionist		Swing	+5.2	

=== Lichtenburg ===
General election 1921: Lichtenburg
Party	Candidate	Votes	%	±%
National	Tielman Johannes de Villiers Roos	1,516	72.1	+3.9
South African	Barend Christian Greyling	587	27.9	−3.9
Majority		929	44.2	+7.8
Turnout		2,103	65.5	−7.1
National hold		Swing	+3.9	

=== Losberg ===
General election 1921: Losberg
Party	Candidate	Votes	%	±%
South African	Theunis Frederik Jacobus Dreyer	1,239	57.3	−1.5
National	Johannes Burger Wolmarans	924	42.7	+1.5
Majority		315	16.6	−3.0
Turnout		2,163	70.6	−3.8
South African hold		Swing	-1.5	

=== Lydenburg ===
General election 1921: Lydenburg
Party	Candidate	Votes	%	±%
South African	Jacobus Nieuwenhuize	1,003	54.5	−1.5
National	François Paul Hoogenhout	836	45.5	+1.5
Majority		167	9.0	−3.0
Turnout		1,839	64.2	+0.7
South African hold		Swing	-1.5	

=== Marico ===
General election 1921: Marico
Party	Candidate	Votes	%	±%
South African	Lodewyk Arnoldus Slabbert Lemmer	1,211	50.0	−1.4
National	Johannes Jacobus Pienaar	1,211	50.0	+1.4
Majority		0	0.0	−2.8
Turnout		2,422	76.1	+1.2
South African hold		Swing	-1.4	

Election decided by lot.

=== Middelburg ===
General election 1921: Middelburg
Party	Candidate	Votes	%	±%
National	Jan Dirk Heyns	1,222	51.4	+0.8
South African	Jacob Letterstedt Hamman	1,157	48.6	−0.8
Majority		65	2.8	+1.6
Turnout		2,379	75.7	+0.8
National hold		Swing	+0.8	

=== Parktown ===
General election 1921: Parktown
Party	Candidate	Votes	%	±%
South African	Richard Feetham	Unopposed		
South African hold				

=== Pietersburg ===
General election 1921: Pietersburg
Party	Candidate	Votes	%	±%
National	Jozua François Naudé	1,108	55.0	−0.6
South African	Gerhardus Petrus Christiaan Kotzé	905	45.0	+0.6
Majority		203	10.0	−1.2
Turnout		2,013	69.2	+1.3
National hold		Swing	-0.6	

=== Potchefstroom ===
General election 1921: Potchefstroom
Party	Candidate	Votes	%	±%
National	Jacob Godfried Obermeyer	1,319	51.0	+2.2
South African	Nicolaas Jacobus de Wet	1,269	49.0	−2.2
Majority		50	2.0	N/A
Turnout		2,588	73.6	+3.8
National gain from South African		Swing	+2.2	

=== Pretoria Central ===
General election 1921: Pretoria Central
Party	Candidate	Votes	%	±%
South African	Edward Rooth	Unopposed		
South African hold				

=== Pretoria District North ===
General election 1921: Pretoria District North
Party	Candidate	Votes	%	±%
National	Jan Abraham Joubert	1,165	51.7	+2.5
South African	Waldemar Teichman	1,088	48.3	−1.5
Majority		77	3.4	N/A
Turnout		2,253	69.2	+3.2
National gain from South African		Swing	+2.0	

=== Pretoria District South ===
General election 1921: Pretoria District South
Party	Candidate	Votes	%	±%
National	Christiaan Hendrik Muller	1,227	52.2	+1.2
South African	Joseph Francis Ludorf	1,123	47.8	−1.2
Majority		104	4.4	+2.4
Turnout		2,350	72.0	+5.4
National hold		Swing	+1.2	

=== Pretoria East ===
General election 1921: Pretoria East
Party	Candidate	Votes	%	±%
South African	Constantine William Giovanetti	1,534	76.3	+17.6
Independent	Eamonn Burgess	476	23.7	New
Majority		1,058	52.6	N/A
Turnout		2,010	64.2	−6.6
South African hold		Swing	N/A	

=== Pretoria West ===
General election 1921: Pretoria West
Party	Candidate	Votes	%	±%
South African	Jan Christiaan Smuts	1,403	71.3	+3.5
National	Sarel Johannes Eloff	531	27.0	+8.1
Independent	Petrus Malherbe van der Westhuizen	35	1.8	New
Majority		872	44.3	−5.6
Turnout		1,969	48.5	−17.9
South African hold		Swing	-2.8	

=== Roodepoort ===
General election 1921: Roodepoort
Party	Candidate	Votes	%	±%
Labour	John Mullineux	1,074	58.1	+7.7
South African	Wilhelm Pieter Pistorius	775	41.9	+16.5
Majority		299	16.2	−8.8
Turnout		1,849	52.8	−7.2
Labour hold		Swing	-4.4	

=== Rustenburg ===
General election 1921: Rustenburg
Party	Candidate	Votes	%	±%
South African	Hendrik Nicolaas Jacobus van der Merwe	1,151	50.0	−0.8
National	Pieter Gert Wessel Grobler	1,150	50.0	+0.8
Majority		1	0.0	−1.6
Turnout		2,301	70.5	−0.9
South African hold		Swing	-0.8	

The election was overturned on appeal and Grobler was declared elected.

=== Soutpansberg ===
General election 1921: Soutpansberg
Party	Candidate	Votes	%	±%
South African	Hendrik Mentz	997	54.5	−3.2
National	Oswald Pirow	833	45.5	+3.2
Majority		164	9.0	−6.4
Turnout		1,830	61.4	−1.5
South African hold		Swing	-3.2	

=== Springs ===
General election 1921: Springs
Party	Candidate	Votes	%	±%
South African	Frans Johannes van Aardt	983	44.8	+15.6
Labour	George Hills	827	37.7	−15.9
National	Willem Joachim van Zyl	384	17.5	+0.3
Majority		156	7.1	N/A
Turnout		2,194	65.3	−3.3
South African gain from Labour		Swing	+15.8	

=== Standerton ===
General election 1921: Standerton
Party	Candidate	Votes	%	±%
South African	Gert Marthinus Claassen	1,215	68.1	−2.7
National	Pieter Wouter de Wet Bekker	568	31.9	+2.7
Majority		615	36.2	−5.4
Turnout		1,783	55.5	+3.8
South African hold		Swing	-2.7	

=== Troyeville ===
General election 1921: Troyeville
Party	Candidate	Votes	%	±%
South African	Walter Solomon Webber	1,192	55.0	New
Labour	Frederic Hugh Page Creswell	976	45.0	−21.6
Majority		216	10.0	N/A
Turnout		2,168	68.3	+3.4
South African gain from Labour		Swing	N/A	

=== Turffontein ===
General election 1921: Turffontein
Party	Candidate	Votes	%	±%
South African	Edwin Watkin Hunt	1,209	55.9	+36.1
Labour	George Benjamin Steer	952	44.1	+3.1
Majority		257	11.8	N/A
Turnout		2,168	68.3	+4.9
South African gain from Labour		Swing	N/A	

=== Ventersdorp ===
General election 1921: Ventersdorp
Party	Candidate	Votes	%	±%
South African	Barend Izak Jacobus van Heerden	1,124	51.9	−0.1
National	August Carl Schulenburg	1,042	48.1	+0.1
Majority		82	3.8	−0.2
Turnout		2,166	71.0	+0.3
South African hold		Swing	-0.1	

=== Von Brandis ===
General election 1921: Von Brandis
Party	Candidate	Votes	%	±%
South African	Emile Nathan	1,235	73.3	+6.3
Labour	Morris James Green	449	26.7	−6.3
Majority		568	46.6	+12.6
Turnout		1,684	51.2	+1.3
South African hold		Swing	+6.3	

=== Vrededorp ===
General election 1921: Vrededorp
Party	Candidate	Votes	%	±%
National	Thomas Christoffel Visser	1,442	78.6	+3.0
South African	Phillipus Lodewicus Lourens	384	20.9	−3.5
Independent	John William Wordingham	8	0.4	New
Majority		1,058	57.7	+6.5
Turnout		1,834	59.2	−3.7
National hold		Swing	+3.3	

=== Wakkerstroom ===
General election 1921: Wakkerstroom
Party	Candidate	Votes	%	±%
South African	James van der Merwe	1,327	50.9	−3.3
National	Albert Kuit	1,276	49.1	+3.3
Majority		51	1.8	−6.6
Turnout		2,603	76.6	+3.1
South African hold		Swing	-3.3	

=== Waterberg ===
General election 1921: Waterberg
Party	Candidate	Votes	%	±%
National	Pieter Wynand le Roux van Niekerk	1,211	64.5	+3.5
South African	George Marais	667	35.5	−3.5
Majority		544	29.0	+7.0
Turnout		1,878	67.4	−4.9
National hold		Swing	+3.5	

=== Witbank ===
General election 1921: Witbank
Party	Candidate	Votes	%	±%
National	Abraham Izak Emmanuel de Villiers	1,059	52.6	+2.7
South African	Henry du Toit	956	47.4	+10.0
Majority		103	5.2	−7.3
Turnout		2,015	63.1	−2.1
National hold		Swing	-3.7	

=== Witwatersberg ===
General election 1921: Witwatersberg
Party	Candidate	Votes	%	±%
South African	Nicolaas Jacobus Pretorius	943	50.0	−0.4
National	Sarel François Alberts	943	50.0	+0.4
Majority		0	0.0	−0.8
Turnout		1,886	69.3	+0.6
South African hold		Swing	-0.4	

Election decided by lot.

=== Wolmaransstad ===
General election 1921: Wolmaransstad
Party	Candidate	Votes	%	±%
National	Jan Christoffel Greyling Kemp	1,152	65.3	−0.7
South African	Pieter Willem Botha	613	34.7	+0.7
Majority		539	30.6	−1.4
Turnout		1,765	60.9	−4.2
National hold		Swing	-0.7	

=== Wonderboom ===
General election 1921: Wonderboom
Party	Candidate	Votes	%	±%
National	Barend Jacob Pienaar	1,410	68.6	+10.9
South African	Isaac Nicolaas van Alphen	645	31.4	+3.4
Majority		765	37.2	+7.5
Turnout		2,055	63.7	−5.5
National hold		Swing	+3.8	

=== Yeoville ===
General election 1921: Yeoville
Party	Candidate	Votes	%	±%
South African	Patrick Duncan	Unopposed		
South African hold				

== Sources ==
- Schoeman, B.M. (1977). Parlementêre verkiesings in Suid-Afrika 1910-1976. Pretoria: Aktuele Publikasies.
- Standard Encyclopaedia of Southern Africa (1972). "House of Assembly" (vol. 5, pp. 617–636). Cape Town: Nasionale Opvoedkundige Uitgewery (Nasou).
- South Africa Government Gazette dated 1921-02-25 number 1125 (1921). pp. 356-359. Pretoria
