= Vasco (House of Assembly of South Africa constituency) =

- Former constituency for the South African House of Assembly
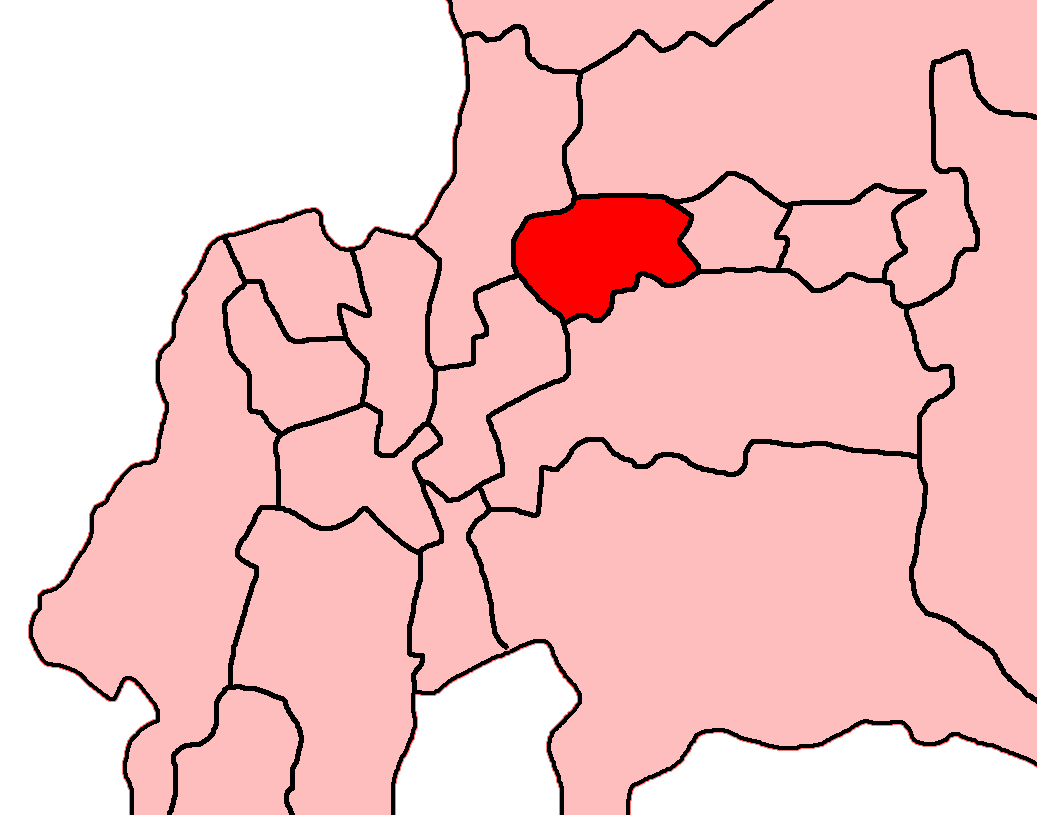
- Location of Vasco within Cape Town (1981)
- Province: Cape of Good Hope
- Electorate: 15,974 (1989 by)

Former constituency
- Created: 1943
- Abolished: 1994
- Number of members: 1
- Last MHA: W. P. Doman (NP)
- Created from: Maitland
- Replaced by: Western Cape

Vasco was a constituency in the Cape Province of South Africa, which existed from 1943 to 1994. It covered various areas of Cape Town’s northern suburbs, centred on its namesake suburb of Vasco. Throughout its existence it elected one member to the House of Assembly and one to the Cape Provincial Council.

== Franchise notes ==
When the Union of South Africa was formed in 1910, the electoral qualifications in use in each pre-existing colony were kept in place. The Cape Colony had implemented a "colour-blind" franchise known as the Cape Qualified Franchise, which included all adult literate men owning more than £75 worth of property (controversially raised from £25 in 1892), and this initially remained in effect after the colony became the Cape Province. As of 1908, 22,784 out of 152,221 electors in the Cape Colony were "Native or Coloured". Eligibility to serve in Parliament and the Provincial Council, however, was restricted to whites from 1910 onward.

The first challenge to the Cape Qualified Franchise came with the Women's Enfranchisement Act, 1930 and the Franchise Laws Amendment Act, 1931, which extended the vote to women and removed property qualifications for the white population only – non-white voters remained subject to the earlier restrictions. In 1936, the Representation of Natives Act removed all black voters from the common electoral roll and introduced three "Native Representative Members", white MPs elected by the black voters of the province and meant to represent their interests in particular. A similar provision was made for Coloured voters with the Separate Representation of Voters Act, 1951, and although this law was challenged by the courts, it went into effect in time for the 1958 general election, which was thus held with all-white voter rolls for the first time in South African history. The all-white franchise would continue until the end of apartheid and the introduction of universal suffrage in 1994.

== History ==
Vasco was first created in 1943, replacing the abolished Maitland constituency, and for most of its history was centred on its namesake suburb and neighbouring Goodwood. Like the rest of the Northern Suburbs, its electorate was largely working-class and Afrikaans-speaking. In its first two elections, it returned cabinet minister James Wellwood Mushet for the United Party, but in 1953 it was taken by the National Party, which would hold it for the remainder of its existence. Its first National MP, cabinet minister Karl Bremer, died shortly after his election to the seat, necessitating a by-election which was won by the NP once again. After another by-election in 1962, it was briefly represented by Frank Waring, one of the first native English-speaking NP cabinet ministers. For the last decade of its existence, the NP faced mainly Conservative Party opposition for the seat.

== Members ==
Election	Member	Party
1943	James Wellwood Mushet	United
1948	James Wellwood Mushet	United
1953	Karl Bremer	National
1953 by	Albertus J. R. van Rhyn	National
1958	C. V. de Villiers	National
1961	C. V. de Villiers	National
1962 by	Frank Waring	National
1966	P. H. Meyer	National
1970	P. H. Meyer	National
1974	P. H. Meyer	National
1977	J. H. Heyns	National
1981	J. H. Heyns	National
1987	J. H. Heyns	National
1989	J. H. Heyns	National
1989 by	W. P. Doman	National
1994	constituency abolished	

== Detailed results ==
=== Elections in the 1940s ===
General election 1943: Vasco
Party	Candidate	Votes	%	±%
United	James Wellwood Mushet	5,052	59.9	New
Reunited National	D. J. J. Mostert	3,381	40.1	New
Majority		1,671	19.8	N/A
Turnout		8,433	79.6	N/A
United win (new seat)				

=== Elections in the 1980s ===
Vasco by-election, 29 November 1989
Party	Candidate	Votes	%	±%
National	W. P. Doman	4,165	58.5	−12.7
Conservative	J. A. Rabe	2,922	41.0	+12.2
Herstigte Nasionale Party	C. A. M. Reyneke	24	0.3	New
Rejected ballots		13	0.2	N/A
Majority		1,243	17.5	−24.9
Turnout		7,124	44.6	−11.7
National hold		Swing	-12.5	
