= Graaff-Reinet (House of Assembly of South Africa constituency) =

South African constituency, 1910–1994

- Former constituency for the South African House of Assembly
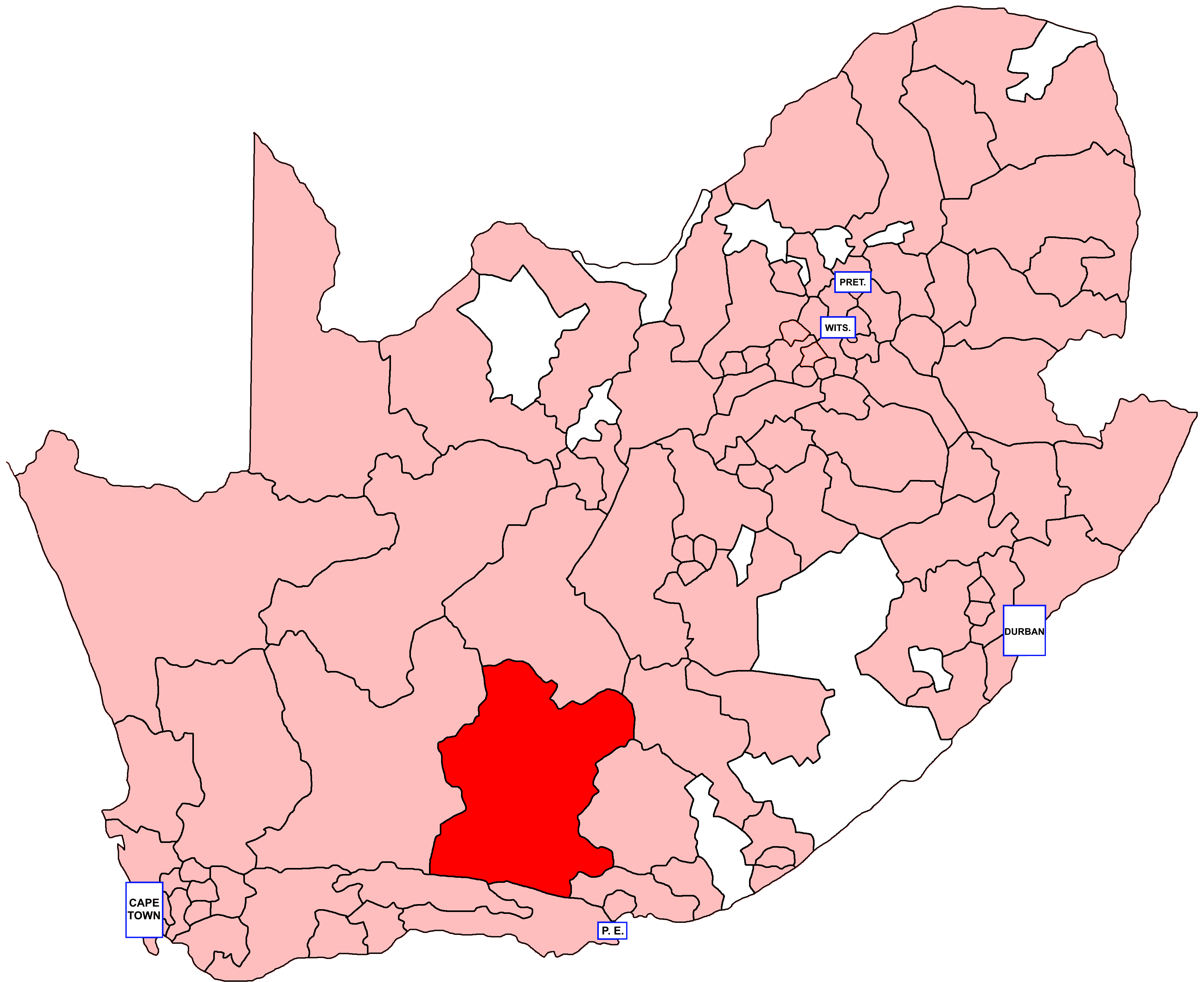
- Location of Graaff-Reinet within South Africa (1981)
- Province: Cape of Good Hope
- Electorate: 9,494 (1989)

Former constituency
- Created: 1910
- Abolished: 1994
- Number of members: 1
- Last MHA: J. L. Retief (NP)
- Replaced by: Eastern Cape

Graaff-Reinet was a constituency in the Cape Province of South Africa, which existed from 1910 to 1994. It covered a rural area of the Karoo centred on the town of Graaff-Reinet. Throughout its existence it elected one member to the House of Assembly and one to the Cape Provincial Council.

== Franchise notes ==
When the Union of South Africa was formed in 1910, the electoral qualifications in use in each pre-existing colony were kept in place. The Cape Colony had implemented a “colour-blind” franchise known as the Cape Qualified Franchise, which included all adult literate men owning more than £75 worth of property (controversially raised from £25 in 1892), and this initially remained in effect after the colony became the Cape Province. As of 1908, 22,784 out of 152,221 electors in the Cape Colony were “Native or Coloured”. Eligibility to serve in Parliament and the Provincial Council, however, was restricted to whites from 1910 onward.

The first challenge to the Cape Qualified Franchise came with the Women's Enfranchisement Act, 1930 and the Franchise Laws Amendment Act, 1931, which extended the vote to women and removed property qualifications for the white population only – non-white voters remained subject to the earlier restrictions. In 1936, the Representation of Natives Act removed all black voters from the common electoral roll and introduced three “Native Representative Members”, white MPs elected by the black voters of the province and meant to represent their interests in particular. A similar provision was made for Coloured voters with the Separate Representation of Voters Act, 1951, and although this law was challenged by the courts, it went into effect in time for the 1958 general election, which was thus held with all-white voter rolls for the first time in South African history. The all-white franchise would continue until the end of apartheid and the introduction of universal suffrage in 1994.

== History ==
Like many constituencies in the rural Cape, the electorate of Graaff-Reinet was largely Afrikaans-speaking and conservative, and with the exception of the inaugural Union election in 1910, the seat was won at every election by the National Party. When the majority of the National Party went into the United Party in 1934, Graaff-Reinet MP Karl Bremer was one of twenty MPs who broke off to form the Purified National Party. Bremer represented the seat until 1943, when he moved to Stellenbosch, but his successors continued to hold the seat by wide margins until the end of apartheid.

== Members ==
Election	Member	Party
1910	G. H. Maasdorp	SAP
1915	J. M. Enslin	National
1920	J. M. Enslin	National
1921	J. M. Enslin	National
1924	Karl Bremer	National
1925 by	I. P. van Heerden	National
1929	Karl Bremer	National
1933	Karl Bremer	National
1934	Karl Bremer	GNP
1938	Karl Bremer	GNP
1943	G. P. Steyn	HNP
1948	G. P. Steyn	HNP
1953	G. P. Steyn	National
1957 by	H. H. van der Ahee	National
1958	H. H. van der Ahee	National
1961	H. H. van der Ahee	National
1966	A. N. Steyn	National
1969 by	S. A. S. Hayward	National
1970	S. A. S. Hayward	National
1974	S. A. S. Hayward	National
1977	S. A. S. Hayward	National
1981	S. A. S. Hayward	National
1987	J. L. Retief	National
1989	J. L. Retief	National
1994	constituency abolished	

== Detailed results ==
=== Elections in the 1910s ===
General election 1910: Graaff-Reinet
Party	Candidate	Votes	%	±%
South African	G. H. Maasdorp	1,423	82.5	New
Ind. South African	P. B. de Ville	302	17.5	New
Majority		1,121	65.0	N/A
South African win (new seat)				

General election 1915: Graaff-Reinet
Party	Candidate	Votes	%	±%
National	J. M. Enslin	1,234	53.6	New
South African	G. H. Maasdorp	1,067	46.4	−36.1
Majority		167	7.2	N/A
Turnout		2,301	80.0	N/A
National gain from South African		Swing	N/A	

=== Elections in the 1920s ===
General election 1920: Graaff-Reinet
Party	Candidate	Votes	%	±%
National	J. M. Enslin	1,480	58.9	+5.3
South African	G. F. Smith	1,033	41.1	−5.3
Majority		447	17.8	+10.6
Turnout		2,513	72.2	−0.8
National hold		Swing	+5.3	

General election 1921: Graaff-Reinet
Party	Candidate	Votes	%	±%
National	J. M. Enslin	1,457	59.0	+0.1
South African	W. Rubidge	1,013	41.0	−0.1
Majority		444	18.0	+0.2
Turnout		2,470	68.3	−3.9
National hold		Swing	+0.1	

General election 1924: Graaff-Reinet
Party	Candidate	Votes	%	±%
National	Karl Bremer	1,849	62.5	+3.5
South African	W. Rubidge	1,091	36.9	−4.1
Rejected ballots		20	0.6	N/A
Majority		758	25.6	+7.6
Turnout		2,960	81.0	+12.7
National hold		Swing	+3.8	

Graaff-Reinet by-election, 8 April 1925
Party	Candidate	Votes	%	±%
National	I. P. van Heerden	Unopposed		
National hold				

Polling in Graaff-Reinet was postponed until 15 July.

General election 1929: Graaff-Reinet
Party	Candidate	Votes	%	±%
National	Karl Bremer	1,586	59.9	−2.6
South African	H. Urquhart	1,036	39.1	+2.2
Rejected ballots		26	1.0	+0.4
Majority		550	20.8	−4.8
Turnout		2,648	80.9	−0.1
National hold		Swing	-2.4	

=== Elections in the 1930s ===
General election 1933: Graaff-Reinet
Party	Candidate	Votes	%	±%
National	Karl Bremer	3,777	78.4	+18.5
Independent	L. A. F. Slabbert	976	20.3	New
Rejected ballots		62	1.3	+0.3
Majority		2,801	58.2	N/A
Turnout		4,815	67.2	−13.7
National hold		Swing	N/A	

General election 1938: Graaff-Reinet
Party	Candidate	Votes	%	±%
Purified National	Karl Bremer	3,169	56.5	−21.9
United	L. A. F. Slabbert	2,375	42.4	New
Rejected ballots		63	1.1	-0.2
Majority		794	14.2	N/A
Turnout		5,607	86.8	+19.6
Purified National hold		Swing	N/A	
