= Fort Beaufort (House of Assembly of South Africa constituency) =

- Former constituency for the South African House of Assembly
- Province: Cape of Good Hope
- Electorate: 9,388 (1961)

Former constituency
- Created: 1910
- Abolished: 1966
- Number of members: 1
- Last MHA: Abraham Hendrik Jonker (NP)
- Replaced by: Cradock

Fort Beaufort was a constituency in the Cape Province of South Africa, which existed from 1910 to 1966. Named after the town of Fort Beaufort, the seat covered a rural area in the centre of the Eastern Cape. Throughout its existence it elected one member to the House of Assembly and one to the Cape Provincial Council.

== Franchise notes ==
When the Union of South Africa was formed in 1910, the electoral qualifications in use in each pre-existing colony were kept in place. The Cape Colony had implemented a “colour-blind” franchise known as the Cape Qualified Franchise, which included all adult literate men owning more than £75 worth of property (controversially raised from £25 in 1892), and this initially remained in effect after the colony became the Cape Province. As of 1908, 22,784 out of 152,221 electors in the Cape Colony were “Native or Coloured”. Eligibility to serve in Parliament and the Provincial Council, however, was restricted to whites from 1910 onward.

The first challenge to the Cape Qualified Franchise came with the Women's Enfranchisement Act, 1930 and the Franchise Laws Amendment Act, 1931, which extended the vote to women and removed property qualifications for the white population only – non-white voters remained subject to the earlier restrictions. In 1936, the Representation of Natives Act removed all black voters from the common electoral roll and introduced three “Native Representative Members”, white MPs elected by the black voters of the province and meant to represent their interests in particular. A similar provision was made for Coloured voters with the Separate Representation of Voters Act, 1951, and although this law was challenged by the courts, it went into effect in time for the 1958 general election, which was thus held with all-white voter rolls for the first time in South African history. The all-white franchise would continue until the end of apartheid and the introduction of universal suffrage in 1994.

== History ==
Fort Beaufort was established by British “1820 Settlers”, and like most of the Eastern Cape, its white population was largely English-speaking. This made it a stronghold of the Unionist Party, whose leader Sir Thomas Smartt represented the seat throughout his leadership. When the Unionists merged with the South African Party, Smartt was re-elected in Fort Beaufort as an SAP candidate, and the seat stayed loyal to the party (and its successor, the United Party) until 1958, when it was captured by Abraham Hendrik Jonker, formerly the United Party MP for Cape Town Gardens, who had defected to the National Party two years prior. In 1966, with parts of the seat having been carved out to form the Ciskei bantustan, it was abolished and largely merged with the neighbouring constituency of Cradock. Jonker died in January 1966, two months before the general election, and the seat remained vacant until its abolition.

== Members ==
Election	Member	Party
1910	Thomas Smartt	Unionist
1915	Thomas Smartt	Unionist
1920	Thomas Smartt	Unionist
1921	Thomas Smartt	South African
1924	Thomas Smartt	South African
1929	R. A. Hockley	South African
1933	R. A. Hockley	South African
1938	Vivian Gordon Fenner Solomon	United Party
1943	Vivian Gordon Fenner Solomon	United Party
1948	Vivian Gordon Fenner Solomon	United Party
1953	Vivian Gordon Fenner Solomon	United Party
1958	Abraham Hendrik Jonker	National Party
1961	Abraham Hendrik Jonker	National Party
1966	Constituency abolished	

== Detailed results ==
=== Elections in the 1910s ===
General election 1910: Fort Beaufort
Party	Candidate	Votes	%	±%
Unionist	Thomas Smartt	Unopposed		
Unionist win (new seat)				

General election 1915: Fort Beaufort
Party	Candidate	Votes	%	±%
Unionist	Thomas Smartt	1,616	73.6	N/A
South African	G. C. Vosloo	580	26.4	New
Majority		1,036	47.2	N/A
Turnout		2,196	76.2	N/A
Unionist hold		Swing	N/A	

=== Elections in the 1920s ===
General election 1920: Fort Beaufort
Party	Candidate	Votes	%	±%
Unionist	Thomas Smartt	Unopposed		
Unionist hold				

General election 1921: Fort Beaufort
Party	Candidate	Votes	%	±%
South African	Thomas Smartt	1,569	64.1	N/A
National	G. H. I. Rood	877	35.9	New
Majority		692	28.2	N/A
Turnout		2,446	69.9	N/A
South African hold		Swing	N/A	

General election 1924: Fort Beaufort
Party	Candidate	Votes	%	±%
South African	Thomas Smartt	1,508	52.6	−11.5
Independent	H. Sinclair	1,328	46.3	New
Rejected ballots		33	1.1	N/A
Majority		180	6.3	N/A
Turnout		2,869	79.9	+10.0
South African hold		Swing	N/A	

General election 1929: Fort Beaufort
Party	Candidate	Votes	%	±%
South African	R. A. Hockley	1,510	55.6	+3.0
Independent	H. Sinclair	1,186	43.7	−2.6
Rejected ballots		20	0.7	-0.4
Majority		324	11.9	+5.6
Turnout		2,716	79.7	−0.2
South African hold		Swing	+2.8	

=== Elections in the 1930s ===
General election 1933: Fort Beaufort
Party	Candidate	Votes	%	±%
South African	R. A. Hockley	Unopposed		
South African hold				

General election 1938: Fort Beaufort
Party	Candidate	Votes	%	±%
United	Vivian Gordon Fenner Solomon	2,858	60.3	N/A
Dominion	T. J. Farrell	1,832	38.7	New
Rejected ballots		47	1.0	N/A
Majority		1,026	21.7	N/A
Turnout		4,737	75.0	N/A
United hold		Swing	N/A	

=== Elections in the 1940s ===
General election 1943: Fort Beaufort
Party	Candidate	Votes	%	±%
United	V. G. F. Solomon	4,313	68.0	+7.1
Independent	N. M. Wienand	2,034	32.0	New
Majority		2,279	36.0	N/A
Turnout		6,347	76.0	+1.0
United hold		Swing	N/A	

General election 1948: Fort Beaufort
Party	Candidate	Votes	%	±%
United	V. G. F. Solomon	4,379	58.9	−9.1
Reunited National	G. H. Bekker	3,060	42.1	New
Majority		1,319	15.8	N/A
Turnout		7,439	84.7	+8.7
United hold		Swing	N/A	
