= Liesbeek (House of Assembly of South Africa constituency) =

- Former constituency for the South African House of Assembly
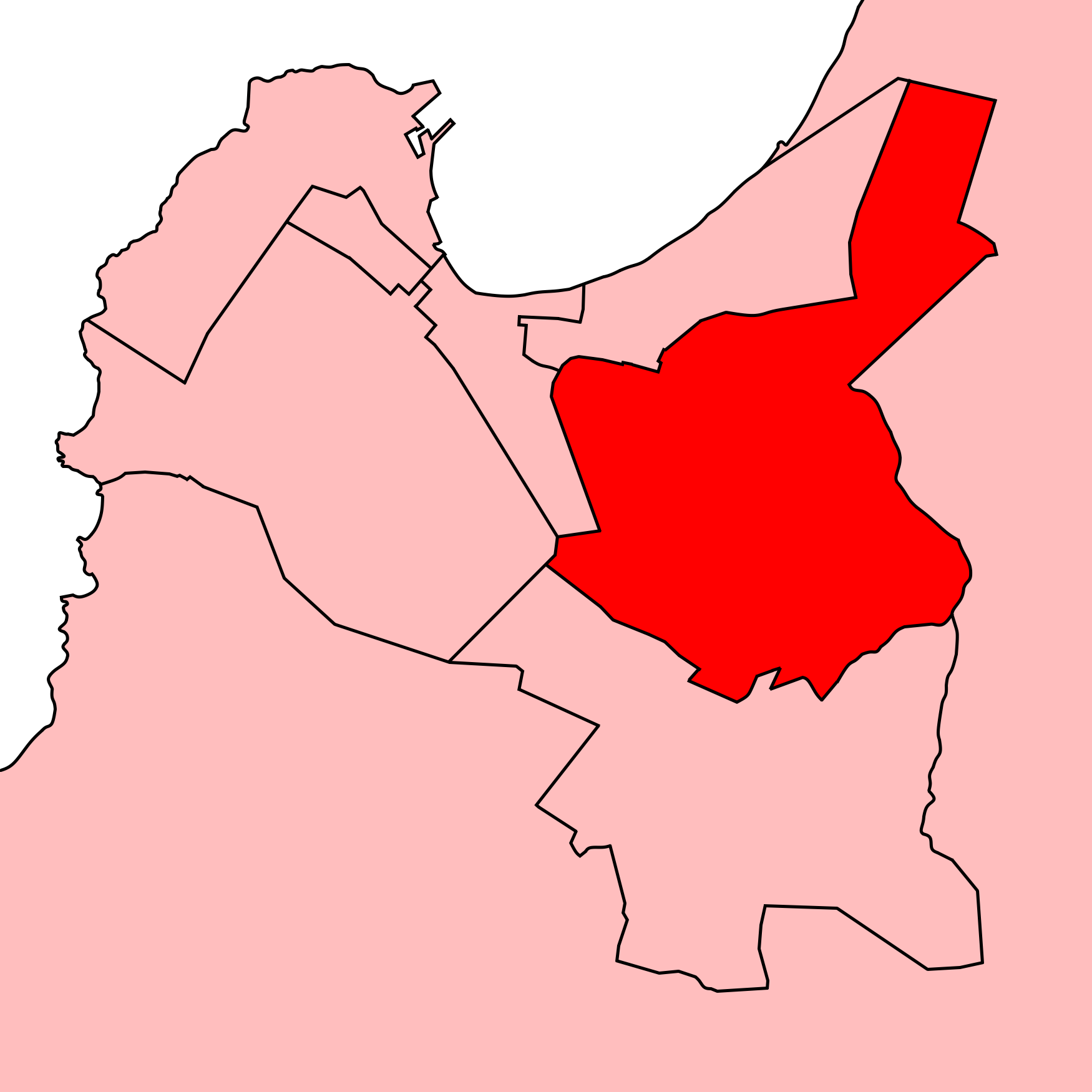
- Location of Liesbeek within Cape Town (1910)
- Province: Cape of Good Hope
- Electorate: 4,432 (1924)

Former constituency
- Created: 1910
- Abolished: 1929
- Number of members: 1
- Last MHA: Charles Pearce (Lab)

Liesbeek was a constituency in the Cape Province of South Africa, which existed from 1910 to 1929. Named for the Liesbeek River, the seat covered various areas on what was then the eastern edge of Cape Town. Throughout its existence it elected one member to the House of Assembly and one to the Cape Provincial Council.

== Franchise notes ==
When the Union of South Africa was formed in 1910, the electoral qualifications in use in each pre-existing colony were kept in place. The Cape Colony had implemented a “colour-blind” franchise known as the Cape Qualified Franchise, which included all adult literate men owning more than £75 worth of property (controversially raised from £25 in 1892), and this initially remained in effect after the colony became the Cape Province. As of 1908, 22,784 out of 152,221 electors in the Cape Colony were “Native or Coloured”. Eligibility to serve in Parliament and the Provincial Council, however, was restricted to whites from 1910 onward.

The first challenge to the Cape Qualified Franchise came with the Women's Enfranchisement Act, 1930 and the Franchise Laws Amendment Act, 1931, which extended the vote to women and removed property qualifications for the white population only – non-white voters remained subject to the earlier restrictions. In 1936, the Representation of Natives Act removed all black voters from the common electoral roll and introduced three “Native Representative Members”, white MPs elected by the black voters of the province and meant to represent their interests in particular. A similar provision was made for Coloured voters with the Separate Representation of Voters Act, 1951, and although this law was challenged by the courts, it went into effect in time for the 1958 general election, which was thus held with all-white voter rolls for the first time in South African history. The all-white franchise would continue until the end of apartheid and the introduction of universal suffrage in 1994.

== History ==
When initially created, Liesbeek was a suburban seat centred on Salt River and Mowbray, but the creation of Rondebosch in 1915 forced it out to the eastern margins of the city. In this form, it was a marginal seat, electing Labour MP Thomas Maginess in 1914 and 1915, the Unionist James Wellwood Mushet in 1920 and 1921, and finally Labour's Charles Pearce in a 1921 by-election. Pearce held the seat until its abolition in 1929. The seat of Maitland, first contested in 1933, bore some resemblance to Liesbeek, and Mushet would serve as its MP between 1938 and 1943.

== Members ==
| Election | Member | Party |
|---|---|---|
| 1910 | B. K. Long | Unionist |
| 1914 by | Thomas Maginess | Labour |
| 1915 | Thomas Maginess | Labour |
| 1920 | James Wellwood Mushet | Unionist |
| 1921 | James Wellwood Mushet | South African |
| 1921 by | Charles Pearce | Labour |
| 1924 | Charles Pearce | Labour |
| 1929 | constituency abolished | |

== Detailed results ==
=== Elections in the 1910s ===
General election 1910: Liesbeek
| Party | Candidate | Votes | % | ±% |
|---|---|---|---|---|
| Unionist | B. K. Long | 1,029 | 51.7 | New |
| South African | C. A. Lageson | 540 | 27.1 | New |
| Independent | E. P. Reilly | 420 | 21.1 | New |
| Majority | | 489 | 24.6 | N/A |
| Unionist win (new seat) | | | | |

Liesbeek by-election, 4 March 1914
| Party | Candidate | Votes | % | ±% |
|---|---|---|---|---|
| Labour | Thomas Maginess | Unopposed | | |
| Labour gain from Unionist | | | | |

General election 1915: Liesbeek
| Party | Candidate | Votes | % | ±% |
|---|---|---|---|---|
| Labour | Thomas Maginess | 1,143 | 43.3 | N/A |
| Independent | B. Upington | 1,142 | 43.3 | New |
| National | H. Stiglingh | 352 | 13.3 | New |
| Majority | | 1 | 0.0 | N/A |
| Turnout | | 2,637 | 64.8 | N/A |
| Labour gain from Unionist | | Swing | N/A | |

=== Elections in the 1920s ===
General election 1920: Liesbeek
| Party | Candidate | Votes | % | ±% |
|---|---|---|---|---|
| Unionist | J. W. Mushet | 832 | 38.6 | New |
| Labour | Charles Pearce | 780 | 36.1 | −7.2 |
| South African | C. A. Lagesen | 546 | 25.3 | New |
| Majority | | 52 | 2.5 | N/A |
| Turnout | | 2,158 | 52.1 | −12.7 |
| Unionist gain from Labour | | Swing | N/A | |

General election 1921: Liesbeek
| Party | Candidate | Votes | % | ±% |
|---|---|---|---|---|
| South African | J. W. Mushet | 1,206 | 51.6 | +13.0 |
| Labour | Charles Pearce | 1,106 | 47.3 | +11.2 |
| Liberal-Labour | A. W. P. Mullany | 25 | 1.1 | New |
| Majority | | 100 | 4.3 | N/A |
| Turnout | | 2,337 | 55.5 | +3.4 |
| South African hold | | Swing | +1.8 | |

Liesbeek by-election, 8 September 1921
| Party | Candidate | Votes | % | ±% |
|---|---|---|---|---|
| Labour | Charles Pearce | 2,134 | 70.2 | +23.2 |
| South African | W. Laite | 904 | 29.8 | −21.4 |
| Majority | | 1,230 | 40.4 | N/A |
| Turnout | | 3,038 | 67.8 | +12.3 |
| Labour gain from South African | | Swing | +22.3 | |

General election 1924: Liesbeek
| Party | Candidate | Votes | % | ±% |
|---|---|---|---|---|
| Labour | Charles Pearce | 1,605 | 51.8 | +4.5 |
| South African | A. E. V. Fraser | 1,393 | 45.0 | −6.6 |
| Rejected ballots | | 97 | 3.2 | N/A |
| Majority | | 212 | 6.8 | N/A |
| Turnout | | 3,095 | 69.8 | +14.2 |
| Labour gain from South African | | Swing | +5.5 | |
