= Ladismith (House of Assembly of South Africa constituency) =

South African constituency, 1910–1933

- Former constituency for the South African House of Assembly
- Province: Cape of Good Hope
- Electorate: 3,029 (1929)

Former constituency
- Created: 1910
- Abolished: 1933
- Number of members: 1
- Last MHA: J. J. M. van Zyl (NP)

Ladismith was a constituency in the Cape Province of South Africa, which existed from 1910 to 1933. It covered a large rural area in the southern Karoo, centred on the town of Ladismith (not to be confused with the larger town of Ladysmith in Natal). Throughout its existence it elected one member to the House of Assembly and one to the Cape Provincial Council.

== Franchise notes ==
When the Union of South Africa was formed in 1910, the electoral qualifications in use in each pre-existing colony were kept in place. The Cape Colony had implemented a “colour-blind” franchise known as the Cape Qualified Franchise, which included all adult literate men owning more than £75 worth of property (controversially raised from £25 in 1892), and this initially remained in effect after the colony became the Cape Province. As of 1908, 22,784 out of 152,221 electors in the Cape Colony were “Native or Coloured”. Eligibility to serve in Parliament and the Provincial Council, however, was restricted to whites from 1910 onward.

The first challenge to the Cape Qualified Franchise came with the Women's Enfranchisement Act, 1930 and the Franchise Laws Amendment Act, 1931, which extended the vote to women and removed property qualifications for the white population only – non-white voters remained subject to the earlier restrictions. In 1936, the Representation of Natives Act removed all black voters from the common electoral roll and introduced three “Native Representative Members”, white MPs elected by the black voters of the province and meant to represent their interests in particular. A similar provision was made for Coloured voters with the Separate Representation of Voters Act, 1951, and although this law was challenged by the courts, it went into effect in time for the 1958 general election, which was thus held with all-white voter rolls for the first time in South African history. The all-white franchise would continue until the end of apartheid and the introduction of universal suffrage in 1994.

== History ==
Ladismith was a marginal seat for most of its history, frequently changing hands between the South African and National parties. Its final MP, Johannes Jacobus Marthinus van Zyl of the National Party, did not stand for re-election when the seat was abolished, but returned to parliament in 1938 as MP for Ceres, representing the Purified National Party.

== Members ==
Election	Member	Party
1910	Heinrich Christian Becker	South African
1915	Heinrich Christian Becker	South African
1918 by	Johannes Jacobus Marthinus van Zyl	National
1920	Paul Jacobus Jordaan	South African
1921	Paul Jacobus Jordaan	South African
1924	Johannes Jacobus Marthinus van Zyl	National
1929	Johannes Jacobus Marthinus van Zyl	National
1933	constituency abolished	

== Detailed results ==
=== Elections in the 1910s ===
General election 1910: Ladismith
Party	Candidate	Votes	%	±%
South African	Heinrich Christian Becker	Unopposed		
South African win (new seat)				

General election 1915: Ladismith
Party	Candidate	Votes	%	±%
South African	H. C. Becker	1,442	52.1	N/A
National	J. J. M. van Zijl	1,302	47.0	New
Labour	C. F. Marincowitz	26	0.9	New
Majority		140	5.1	N/A
Turnout		2,770	90.4	N/A
South African hold		Swing	N/A	

Ladismith by-election, 20 December 1918
Party	Candidate	Votes	%	±%
National	Johannes Jacobus Marthinus van Zyl	1,469	55.1	+8.1
South African	D. van V. Hofman	1,196	44.9	−7.2
Majority		273	10.2	N/A
Turnout		2,665	81.9	−8.5
National gain from South African		Swing	+7.7	

=== Elections in the 1920s ===
General election 1920: Ladismith
Party	Candidate	Votes	%	±%
South African	Paul Jacobus Jordaan	1,648	53.1	+1.0
National	Johannes Jacobus Marthinus van Zyl	1,454	46.9	−0.1
Majority		140	6.2	+1.1
Turnout		3,102	88.3	−2.1
South African hold		Swing	+0.6	

General election 1921: Ladismith
Party	Candidate	Votes	%	±%
South African	Paul Jacobus Jordaan	1,585	50.4	−2.7
National	Johannes Jacobus Marthinus van Zyl	1,559	49.6	+2.7
Majority		26	0.8	−5.4
Turnout		3,144	86.6	−1.7
South African hold		Swing	-2.7	

General election 1924: Ladismith
Party	Candidate	Votes	%	±%
National	J. J. M. van Zyl	1,776	51.4	+1.8
South African	Henry Burton	1,663	48.1	−2.3
Rejected ballots		16	0.5	N/A
Majority		113	3.3	N/A
Turnout		3,455	91.6	+5.0
National gain from South African		Swing	+2.0	

General election 1929: Ladismith
Party	Candidate	Votes	%	±%
National	J. J. M. van Zyl	1,558	62.7	+11.3
South African	N. J. Hofmeyr	858	34.5	−13.6
Rejected ballots		68	2.8	+2.3
Majority		700	28.2	+24.9
Turnout		2,484	82.0	−9.6
National gain from South African		Swing	+12.5	
