= Wodehouse (House of Assembly of South Africa constituency) =

South African constituency, 1910–1943

- Former constituency for the South African House of Assembly
- Province: Cape of Good Hope
- Electorate: 6,485 (1938)

Former constituency
- Created: 1910
- Abolished: 1943
- Number of members: 1
- Last MHA: Stephanus Bekker (UP)
- Replaced by: Aliwal; Cradock; Queenstown

Wodehouse was a constituency in the Cape Province of South Africa, which existed from 1910 to 1943. It covered a rural area of the Eastern Cape centred on the town of Dordrecht. Throughout its existence it elected one member to the House of Assembly and one to the Cape Provincial Council.

== Franchise notes ==
When the Union of South Africa was formed in 1910, the electoral qualifications in use in each pre-existing colony were kept in place. The Cape Colony had implemented a “colour-blind” franchise known as the Cape Qualified Franchise, which included all adult literate men owning more than £75 worth of property (controversially raised from £25 in 1892), and this initially remained in effect after the colony became the Cape Province. As of 1908, 22,784 out of 152,221 electors in the Cape Colony were “Native or Coloured”. Eligibility to serve in Parliament and the Provincial Council, however, was restricted to whites from 1910 onward.

The first challenge to the Cape Qualified Franchise came with the Women's Enfranchisement Act, 1930 and the Franchise Laws Amendment Act, 1931, which extended the vote to women and removed property qualifications for the white population only – non-white voters remained subject to the earlier restrictions. In 1936, the Representation of Natives Act removed all black voters from the common electoral roll and introduced three “Native Representative Members”, white MPs elected by the black voters of the province and meant to represent their interests in particular. A similar provision was made for Coloured voters with the Separate Representation of Voters Act, 1951, and although this law was challenged by the courts, it went into effect in time for the 1958 general election, which was thus held with all-white voter rolls for the first time in South African history. The all-white franchise would continue until the end of apartheid and the introduction of universal suffrage in 1994.

== History ==
Unlike most of the Eastern Cape, Wodehouse had a largely Afrikaans-speaking electorate, and tended to vote more like its neighbours to the north and west than the ones to its east. In its early years, it traded hands between Jan Abraham Venter of the South African Party and Octavius Septimus Vermooten of the National Party, but in 1933, Vermooten retired from parliament and handed over to Stephanus Bekker, who would represent Wodehouse for the remainder of the seat’s existence. He joined the United Party on its formation in 1934, and stayed with that party at least as far as the 1938 general election, in which he narrowly held the seat against a Purified National Party opponent. Wodehouse was abolished in 1943 and split between the neighbouring seats of Aliwal, Cradock and Queenstown. Bekker did not stand for re-election.

== Members ==
Election	Member	Party
1910	J. A. Venter	South African
1915	O. S. Vermooten	National
1920	O. S. Vermooten	National
1921	J. A. Venter	South African
1924	O. S. Vermooten	National
1929	O. S. Vermooten	National
1933	Stephanus Bekker	National
1934	Stephanus Bekker	United
1938	Stephanus Bekker	United
1943	constituency abolished	

== Detailed results ==
=== Elections in the 1910s ===
General election 1910: Wodehouse
Party	Candidate	Votes	%	±%
South African	J. A. Venter	Unopposed		
South African win (new seat)				

General election 1915: Wodehouse
Party	Candidate	Votes	%	±%
National	O. S. Vermooten	1,292	50.9	New
South African	J. A. Venter	1,247	49.1	N/A
Majority		45	1.8	N/A
Turnout		2,539	87.3	N/A
National gain from South African		Swing	N/A	

=== Elections in the 1920s ===
General election 1920: Wodehouse
Party	Candidate	Votes	%	±%
National	O. S. Vermooten	1,551	50.6	−0.3
South African	J. A. Venter	1,513	49.4	+0.3
Majority		38	1.2	−0.6
Turnout		3,064	82.2	−5.1
National hold		Swing	-0.3	

General election 1921: Wodehouse
Party	Candidate	Votes	%	±%
South African	J. A. Venter	1,636	50.9	+1.5
National	O. S. Vermooten	1,574	49.1	−1.5
Majority		62	1.8	N/A
Turnout		3,210	80.7	−1.5
South African gain from National		Swing	+1.5	

General election 1924: Wodehouse
Party	Candidate	Votes	%	±%
National	O. S. Vermooten	1,620	53.2	+4.1
South African	J. A. Venter	1,410	46.3	−4.6
Rejected ballots		13	0.5	N/A
Majority		210	6.9	N/A
Turnout		3,210	87.7	+7.0
National gain from South African		Swing	+4.4	

General election 1929: Wodehouse
Party	Candidate	Votes	%	±%
National	O. S. Vermooten	1,744	55.1	+1.9
South African	J. A. Venter	1,368	43.2	−3.1
Rejected ballots		52	1.7	+1.2
Majority		376	11.9	+5.0
Turnout		3,164	89.1	+1.4
National hold		Swing	+2.5	

=== Elections in the 1930s ===
General election 1933: Wodehouse
Party	Candidate	Votes	%	±%
National	Stephanus Bekker	3,527	70.0	+14.9
Independent	J. H. Munnik	1,454	28.8	New
Rejected ballots		60	1.2	-0.5
Majority		2,073	41.1	N/A
Turnout		5,041	71.8	−17.3
National hold		Swing	N/A	

General election 1938: Wodehouse
Party	Candidate	Votes	%	±%
United	Stephanus Bekker	3,037	50.7	−19.3
Purified National	J. F. van Bekker	2,935	49.0	New
Rejected ballots		20	0.3	-0.9
Majority		102	1.7	N/A
Turnout		5,992	92.4	+20.6
United hold		Swing	N/A	
