= Ceres (House of Assembly of South Africa constituency) =

- Former constituency for the South African House of Assembly
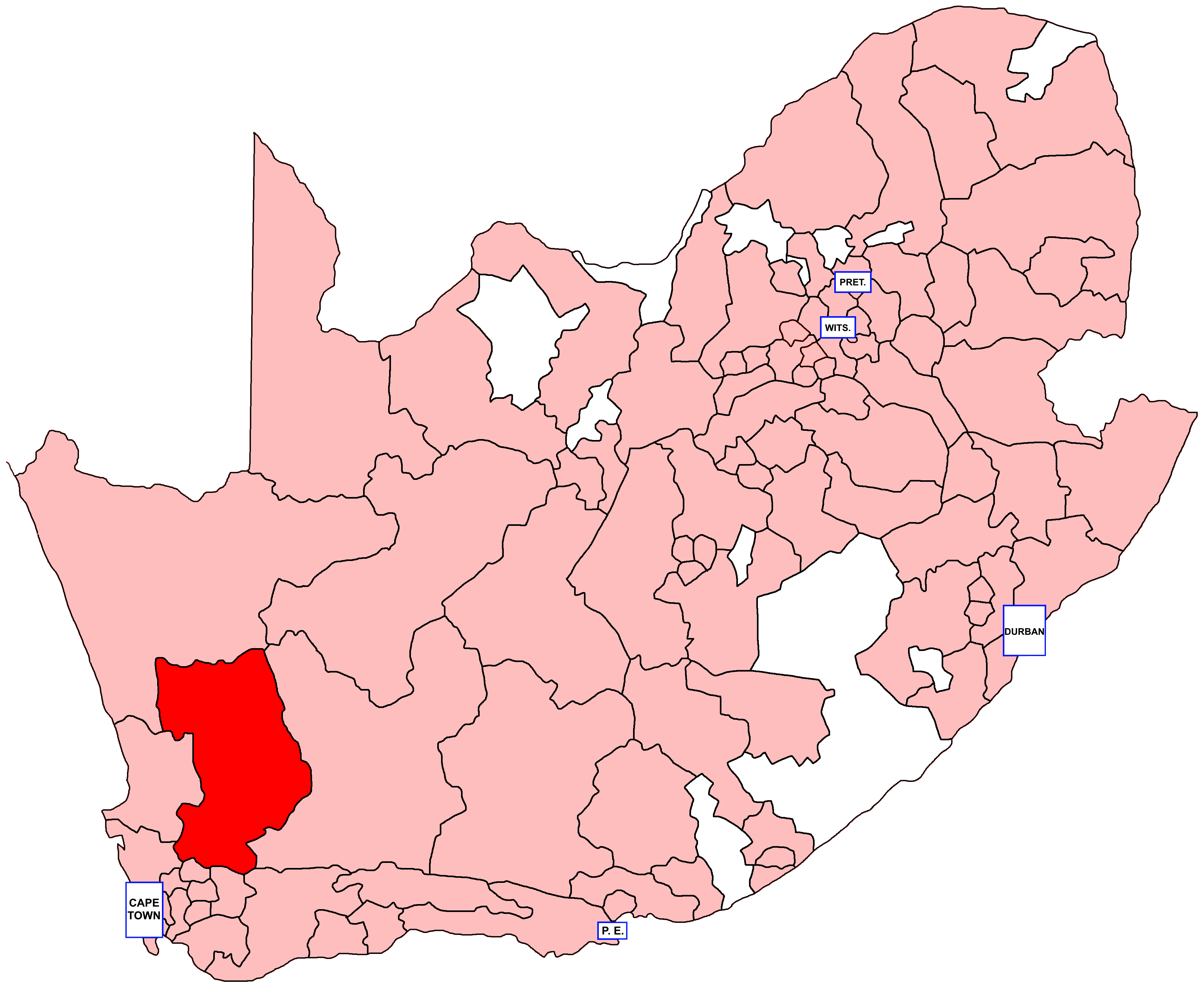
- Location of Ceres within South Africa (1981)
- Province: Cape of Good Hope
- Electorate: 10,691 (1989 by)

Former constituency
- Created: 1910
- Abolished: 1994
- Number of members: 1
- Last MHA: M. van S. Hamman (NP)
- Replaced by: Western Cape

Ceres was a constituency in the Cape Province of South Africa, which existed from 1910 to 1994. It covered a large rural area centred on the town of Ceres. Throughout its existence it elected one member to the House of Assembly and one to the Cape Provincial Council.

== Franchise notes ==
When the Union of South Africa was formed in 1910, the electoral qualifications in use in each pre-existing colony were kept in place. The Cape Colony had implemented a “colour-blind” franchise known as the Cape Qualified Franchise, which included all adult literate men owning more than £75 worth of property (controversially raised from £25 in 1892), and this initially remained in effect after the colony became the Cape Province. As of 1908, 22,784 out of 152,221 electors in the Cape Colony were “Native or Coloured”. Eligibility to serve in Parliament and the Provincial Council, however, was restricted to whites from 1910 onward.

The first challenge to the Cape Qualified Franchise came with the Women's Enfranchisement Act, 1930 and the Franchise Laws Amendment Act, 1931, which extended the vote to women and removed property qualifications for the white population only – non-white voters remained subject to the earlier restrictions. In 1936, the Representation of Natives Act removed all black voters from the common electoral roll and introduced three “Native Representative Members”, white MPs elected by the black voters of the province and meant to represent their interests in particular. A similar provision was made for Coloured voters with the Separate Representation of Voters Act, 1951, and although this law was challenged by the courts, it went into effect in time for the 1958 general election, which was thus held with all-white voter rolls for the first time in South African history. The all-white franchise would continue until the end of apartheid and the introduction of universal suffrage in 1994.

== History ==
As with most of the Karoo, the electorate of Ceres was largely Afrikaans-speaking, and the seat was a stronghold of the National Party and its predecessors. With the exception of the 1910 and 1915 elections, in which it was held by the South African Party, the NP won Ceres every time it was contested. Its first MP, James Tennant Molteno, had been a leading anti-imperialist politician in the Cape Colony, and served as the inaugural Speaker of the House of Assembly before retiring to become South Africa’s High Commissioner in London. For some time after Molteno’s departure, Ceres maintained a strong presence from both the SAP and the Nationalists, with most elections being closely fought. The exception was 1933, in which the two parties were in coalition and incumbent Nationalist MP Johannes Wilhelmus Jacobus Wessel Roux faced only an independent opponent. After 1948, the seat became considerably safer for the NP, who held it unopposed at several elections in the 1960s and 70s and faced only Conservative Party opponents in the seat’s last few elections.

== Members ==
Election	Member	Party
1910	James Tennant Molteno	SAP
1915	J. G. du Toit	SAP
1920	Johannes Wilhelmus Jacobus Wessel Roux	National
1921	Johannes Wilhelmus Jacobus Wessel Roux	National
1924	Johannes Wilhelmus Jacobus Wessel Roux	National
1929	Johannes Wilhelmus Jacobus Wessel Roux	National
1933	Johannes Wilhelmus Jacobus Wessel Roux	National
1934	Johannes Wilhelmus Jacobus Wessel Roux	United
1938	Johannes Jacobus Marthinus van Zyl	GNP
1943	Albert Jacobus Stals	HNP
1948	Albert Jacobus Stals	HNP
1951 by	Karl Bremer	National
1953	P. J. H. Luttig	National
1958	P. J. H. Luttig	National
1961	Stefanus Lourens Muller	National
1966	Stefanus Lourens Muller	National
1970	Stefanus Lourens Muller	National
1974	Stefanus Lourens Muller	National
1977	Stefanus Lourens Muller	National
1979 by	P. B. B. Hugo	National
1981	P. B. B. Hugo	National
1987	Willem Abraham van Niekerk	National
1989	Willem Abraham van Niekerk	National
1989 by	M. van S. Hamman	National
1994	constituency abolished	

== Detailed results ==
=== Elections in the 1910s ===
General election 1910: Ceres
Party	Candidate	Votes	%	±%
South African	James Tennant Molteno	Unopposed		
South African win (new seat)				

General election 1915: Ceres
Party	Candidate	Votes	%	±%
South African	J. G. du Toit	1,388	55.8	N/A
National	J. W. J. W. Roux	1,099	44.2	New
Majority		289	11.6	N/A
Turnout		2,487	82.0	N/A
South African hold		Swing	N/A	

=== Elections in the 1920s ===
General election 1920: Ceres
Party	Candidate	Votes	%	±%
National	J. W. J. W. Roux	1,681	55.8	+11.6
South African	E. W. Krige	1,329	44.2	−11.6
Majority		352	11.6	N/A
Turnout		3,010	84.9	+2.9
National gain from South African		Swing	+11.6	

General election 1921: Ceres
Party	Candidate	Votes	%	±%
National	J. W. J. W. Roux	1,651	55.8	+−0
South African	D. P. S. Brink	1,308	44.2	+−0
Majority		343	11.6	+−0
Turnout		2,959	80.0	−4.9
National hold		Swing	+-0	

General election 1924: Ceres
Party	Candidate	Votes	%	±%
National	J. W. J. W. Roux	1,683	52.8	−3.0
South African	J. G. du Toit	1,474	46.2	+2.0
Rejected ballots		32	1.0	N/A
Majority		209	6.6	−5.0
Turnout		3,189	86.9	+6.9
National hold		Swing	-2.5	

General election 1929: Ceres
Party	Candidate	Votes	%	±%
National	J. W. J. W. Roux	1,620	57.5	+4.7
South African	E. H. Nellmapius	1,179	41.8	−4.4
Rejected ballots		20	0.7	-0.3
Majority		441	15.7	+9.1
Turnout		2,819	87.3	+0.4
National hold		Swing	+4.6	

=== Elections in the 1930s ===
General election 1933: Ceres
Party	Candidate	Votes	%	±%
National	J. W. J. W. Roux	2,514	57.9	+0.4
Independent	E. H. Nellmapius	1,786	41.1	−0.7
Rejected ballots		41	1.0	+0.3
Majority		728	16.8	+1.1
Turnout		4,341	68.5	−18.8
National hold		Swing	+0.6	

General election 1938: Ceres
Party	Candidate	Votes	%	±%
Purified National	Johannes Jacobus Marthinus van Zyl	3,082	50.2	New
United	E. M. Krige	3,017	49.1	New
Rejected ballots		45	0.7	-0.3
Majority		65	1.1	N/A
Turnout		6,144	91.5	+23.0
Purified National gain from United		Swing	N/A	

=== Elections in the 1940s ===
General election 1943: Ceres
Party	Candidate	Votes	%	±%
Reunited National	A. J. Stats	3,760	50.5	+−0
United	J. H. Loock	3,677	49.5	+−0
Majority		93	1.0	+−0
Turnout		7,437	88.4	−2.5
Reunited National hold		Swing	+-0	

General election 1948: Ceres
Party	Candidate	Votes	%	±%
Reunited National	A. J. Stats	4,949	62.2	+11.7
United	C. Brink	3,003	37.8	−11.7
Majority		1,946	24.4	+23.4
Turnout		7,952	86.4	−2.0
Reunited National hold		Swing	+11.7	

=== Elections in the 1980s ===
Vasco by-election, 29 November 1989
Party	Candidate	Votes	%	±%
National	M. van S. Hamman	4,514	60.3	−4.9
Conservative	N. S. Burnett	2,944	39.3	+4.6
Rejected ballots		29	0.4	N/A
Majority		1,570	21.0	−9.4
Turnout		7,487	70.0	−7.3
National hold		Swing	-4.7	
