= Maitland (House of Assembly of South Africa constituency) =

- Former constituency for the South African House of Assembly
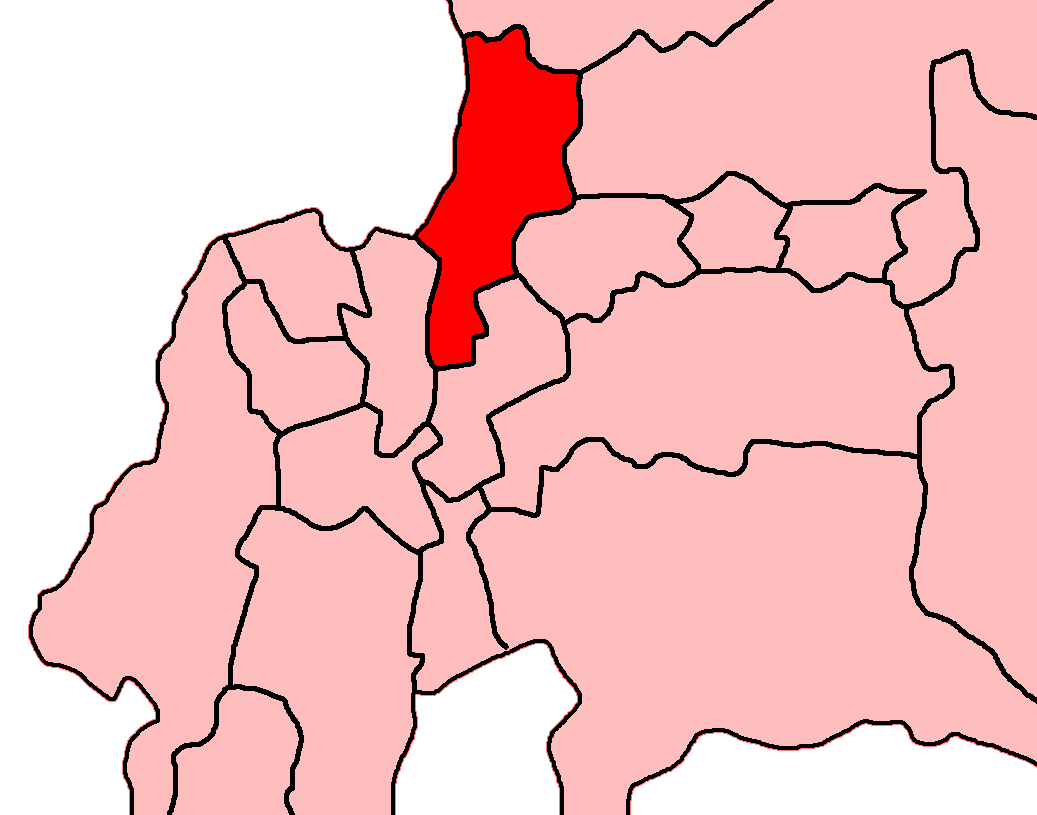
- Location of Maitland within Cape Town (1981)
- Province: Cape of Good Hope
- Electorate: 19,750 (1991 by)

Former constituency
- Created: 1933
- Abolished: 1994
- Number of members: 1
- Last MHA: Louis Pienaar (NP)
- Replaced by: Western Cape

Maitland was a constituency in the Cape Province of South Africa, which existed from 1933 to 1943 and again from 1953 to 1994. Named for the suburb of Maitland, the seat covered various areas in the inner eastern suburbs of Cape Town. Throughout its existence it elected one member to the House of Assembly and one to the Cape Provincial Council.

== Franchise notes ==
When the Union of South Africa was formed in 1910, the electoral qualifications in use in each pre-existing colony were kept in place. The Cape Colony had implemented a "colour-blind" franchise known as the Cape Qualified Franchise, which included all adult literate men owning more than £75 worth of property (controversially raised from £25 in 1892), and this initially remained in effect after the colony became the Cape Province. As of 1908, 22,784 out of 152,221 electors in the Cape Colony were "Native or Coloured". Eligibility to serve in Parliament and the provincial council, however, was restricted to whites from 1910 onward.

The first challenge to the Cape Qualified Franchise came with the Women's Enfranchisement Act, 1930 and the Franchise Laws Amendment Act, 1931, which extended the vote to women and removed property qualifications for the white population only – non-white voters remained subject to the earlier restrictions. In 1936, the Representation of Natives Act removed all black voters from the common electoral roll and introduced three "Native Representative Members", white MPs elected by the black voters of the province and meant to represent their interests in particular. A similar provision was made for Coloured voters with the Separate Representation of Voters Act, 1951, and although this law was challenged by the courts, it went into effect in time for the 1958 general election, which was thus held with all-white voter rolls for the first time in South African history. The all-white franchise would continue until the end of apartheid and the introduction of universal suffrage in 1994.

== History ==
When first created, Maitland, like the rest of Cape Town, was a stronghold of the governing South African Party (SAP). Its second iteration remained a safe opposition seat (after the National Party won government in 1948) for much of its early history. Its first MP on recreation in 1953 was a young Zach de Beer, who would later go on to become leader of the Progressive Federal and Democratic Parties. At the time, de Beer represented the United Party, the main opposition party, and after his defection to the newly created Progressive Party, he lost re-election to the UP candidate.

After de Beer's defeat, Maitland became a marginal seat, won by the UP in 1961, the NP in 1966, and the UP again in 1970 and 1974. In 1977, however, it was won by the NP's Kent Durr, who would represent the seat until 1991 and serve as a cabinet minister under State President F. W. de Klerk. Durr was appointed as Ambassador to London in 1991, and the resulting by-election provided an opportunity for Louis Pienaar to return to parliament following his time as Administrator of South West Africa.

== Members ==
| Election | Member | Party |
|---|---|---|
| 1933 | R. J. du Toit | South African |
| 1934 | R. J. du Toit | United |
| 1938 | James Wellwood Mushet | United |
| 1943 | constituency abolished | |

| Election | Member | Party |
|---|---|---|
| 1953 | Zach de Beer | United |
| 1958 | Zach de Beer | United |
| 1959 | Zach de Beer | Progressive |
| 1961 | Tony Hickman | United |
| 1966 | Douglas Carr | National |
| 1970 | Tony Hickman | United |
| 1974 | Tony Hickman | United |
| 1977 | Kent Durr | National |
| 1981 | Kent Durr | National |
| 1987 | Kent Durr | National |
| 1989 | Kent Durr | National |
| 1991 by | Louis Pienaar | National |
| 1994 | constituency abolished | |

== Detailed results ==
=== Elections in the 1930s ===
General election 1933: Maitland
| Party | Candidate | Votes | % | ±% |
|---|---|---|---|---|
| South African | R. J. du Toit | 2,383 | 57.0 | New |
| Independent | A. J. Chiappini | 1,716 | 41.1 | New |
| Rejected ballots | | 81 | 1.9 | N/A |
| Majority | | 667 | 16.0 | N/A |
| Turnout | | 4,180 | 68.9 | N/A |
| South African win (new seat) | | | | |

General election 1938: Maitland
| Party | Candidate | Votes | % | ±% |
|---|---|---|---|---|
| United | James Wellwood Mushet | 3,780 | 49.1 | N/A |
| Purified National | P. J. H. Hofmeyr | 3,427 | 44.5 | New |
| Labour | W. A. Costello | 431 | 5.6 | New |
| Rejected ballots | | 66 | 0.8 | N/A |
| Majority | | 353 | 4.6 | N/A |
| Turnout | | 7,704 | 82.7 | N/A |
| United hold | | Swing | N/A | |

=== Elections in the 1990s ===
Maitland by-election, 6 March 1991
| Party | Candidate | Votes | % | ±% |
|---|---|---|---|---|
| National | Louis Pienaar | 6,009 | 65.4 | +11.1 |
| Conservative | J. L. Kruger | 3,152 | 34.3 | New |
| Rejected ballots | | 24 | 0.3 | N/A |
| Majority | | 2,857 | 31.1 | N/A |
| Turnout | | 9,185 | 46.5 | −10.5 |
| National hold | | Swing | N/A | |
