= Karl Bremer Hospital =

Hospital in Bellville, Western Cape, South Africa

- Western Cape Department of Health
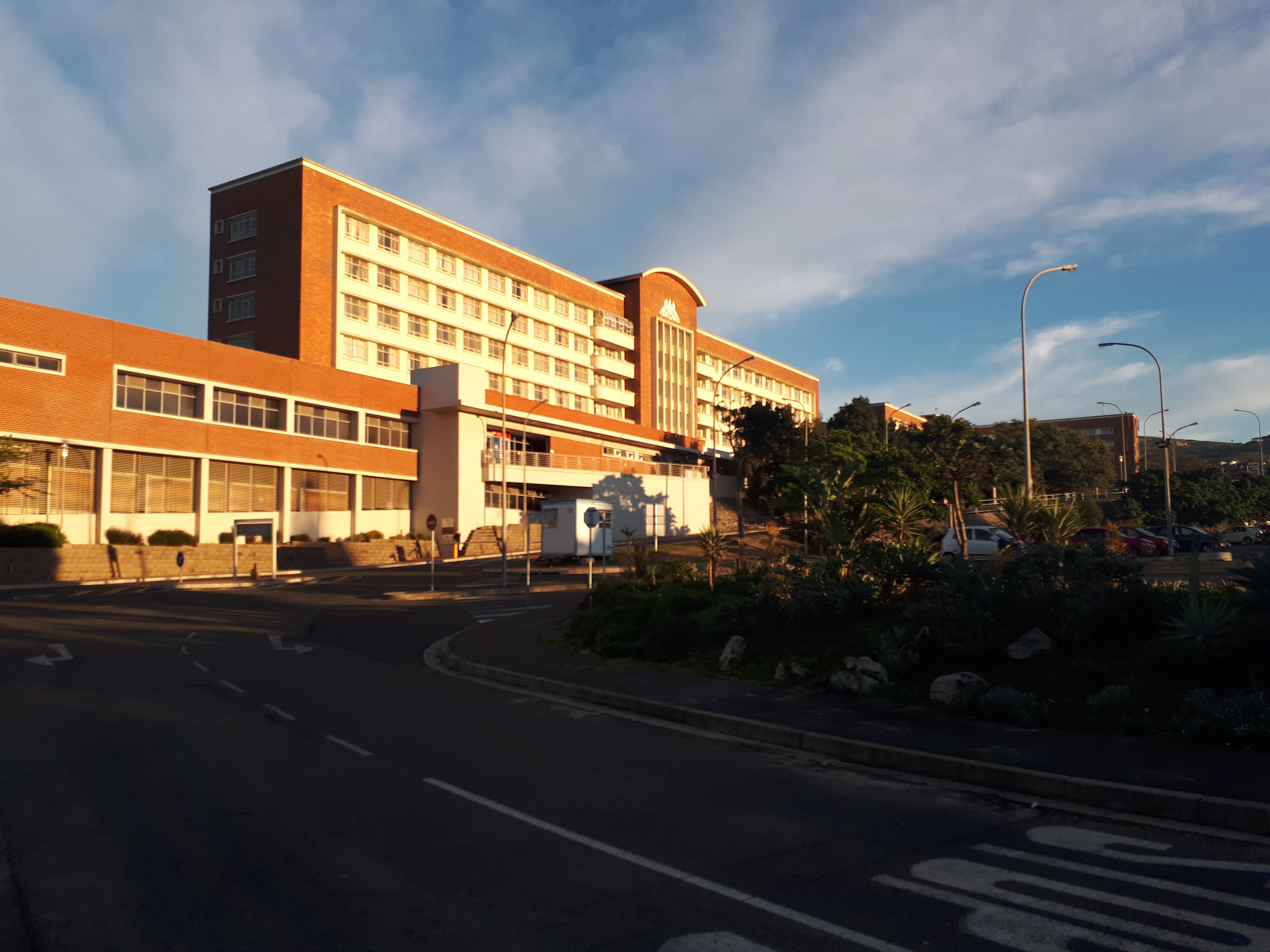
- Karl Bremer Hospital 2018

Geography
- Location: Bellvile West, Bellville, Western Cape, South Africa
- Coordinates: 33.8916°S 18.6079°E

Organisation
- Care system: Department of Health
- Type: District General

Services
- Emergency department: Yes, Major Trauma Centre

History
- Founded: 1956

Links
- Other links: Tygerberg Hospital, Groote Schuur Hospital

Karl Bremer Hospital is a district general hospital, situated in Bellville, Western Cape, South Africa. It was opened in 1956 with one ward. It was originally an academic hospital for medical students of Stellenbosch University and was utilised for this purpose until 1976, after which it changed to a hospital catering for private patients.

== Namesake ==
The hospital is named after Karl Bremer (1885–1953). Bremer was a Medical Doctor, a Minister of Health in DF Malan’s Cabinet and Vice-chancellor of the Stellenbosch University.

== Changes and events through the years ==
In 1957 the Cape Provincial Administrator, PJ Oliver announced that “Non-European” nurses may receive practical training in the hospital. South Africa was in 1956 a country with race segregation. By 1958 a pathology section was created under Prof HW Weber. The Neurosurgery specialist unit was developed under AP Rose-Innes in 1972. The academic classification was taken away in 1976 and the hospital catered for private patients. An oncology centre was created under Leon Gouws. in 1990, however in 2011 it moved to the suburb Panorama. Karl Bremer hospital status changed to a secondary hospital for government patients in 1996. The hospital has its own Pharmacy. In 2007 the University of the Western Cape started to use the hospital as part of their undergraduate service learning in Pharmacy. This applied to their pharmacy students. The status of the hospital changed in 2009 to become a district hospital status. An emergency section was built in 2013. This emergency section won them the Socio-Economic Pilot award.

On 3 December 1967, while Christiaan Barnard was performing the world’s first heart transplant in Groote Schuur Hospital, the heart donor, Denise Darvall also donated her kidneys and they were transplanted in Karl Bremer Hospital.

The South African Government used Karl Bremer hospital as a medical treatment centre for captured political activists (which were opposed to the Ruling party). This was done in a secret way, so that these activists could not be identified. One example is Robert Sobukwe who had an operation on his prostate on 1 February 1967 in the hospital.

== Accreditation ==
The hospital fulfils its States obligation to provide HIV, AIDS and TB-related treatment. HIV counselling is done. The hospital is an accredited antiretroviral (ARV) treatment institution.

== Other ==
"Theatre nurses qualify at Karl Bremer". 10 April 1971.
