= James Wellwood Mushet =

Politician and businessman in South Africa (1881/82–1954)

The Honourable James Wellwood Mushet
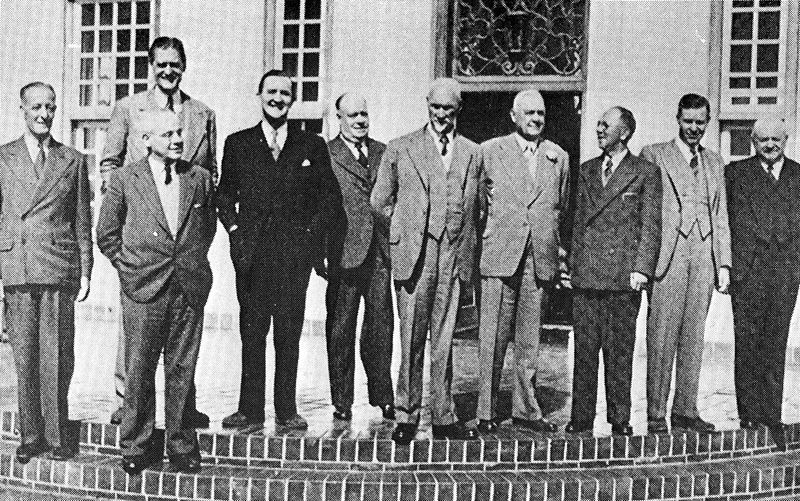
- J. W. Mushet fifth from left

Minister of Public Works
- Prime Minister: Jan Christian Smuts

Minister of Posts and Telegraphs
- Prime Minister: Jan Christian Smuts

Minister of Economic Development
- In office January 1948 – 4 June 1948
- Prime Minister: Jan Christian Smuts
- Preceded by: Sidney Frank Waterson
- Succeeded by: Eric Hendrik Louw

Member of the House of Assembly
- In office 10 March 1920 – 1921
- Constituency: Liesbeek
- In office 18 May 1938 – 15 April 1953
- Constituency: Maitland (1938–1943); Vasco (1943–1953)

Personal details
- Born: 1881/1882
- Died: 31 May 1954 (aged 71–72)
- Party: Unionist; South African; United

James Wellwood Mushet (1881/1882 – 31 May 1954) was a Scottish-born South African businessman and politician. He held several cabinet posts and served as a member of the House of Assembly.

== Life and Career ==
Mushet grew up in Scotland but emigrated to South Africa in 1899 at the age of 18, where he established a general merchant business, J. W. Mushet & Co., with branches in Cape Town, Durban and Johannesburg. In 1912, he married Alice Henrietta Elizabeth Findlay, the niece of Olive Schreiner, in a childless marriage. He became a close friend of Jack A. L. Basson, a fellow UP politician and later MP for Sea Point, who named his son, James Wellwood Basson, after him and Mushet even regarded him as his own son.

=== Political Career ===
Mushet unsuccessfully contested the 1915 general election as an independent candidate in Woodstock, but later joined the Unionist Party and won the Liesbeek constituency in 1920 election. He joined the South African Party as a part of its merger with the Unionist Party and defended his seat in the 1921 election, but resigned soon after. He attempted to return to national politics in 1933 when he unsuccessfully contested the Bellville seat as an independent, but was defeated by the former Labour leader Frederic Creswell. He joined the United Party and was elected for Maitland in 1938 and later was reelected twice for Vasco constituency, which had replaced Maitland. In the 1953 election, he stood in Bellville-Parow, but was defieted by Jan Haak from the National Party.

From 1945, he served in the Smuts' cabinet and held several ministerial portfolios, including Public Works, Posts and Telegraphs and Economic Development.
