= Karl Bremer =

South African politician and medical doctor

Dr. Karl Bremer
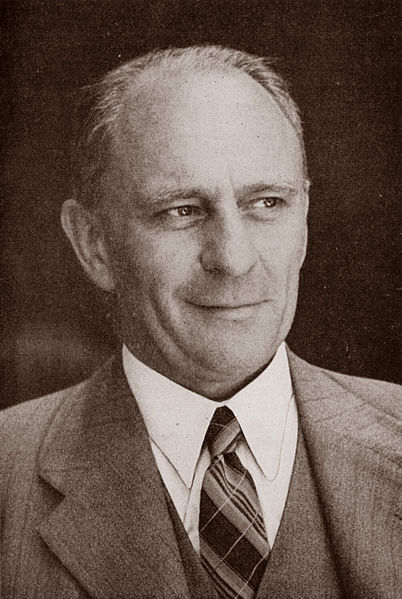
- Karl Bremer in 1950

Minister of Health and Social Welfare
- In office 1951–1953
- Prime Minister: D. F. Malan
- Preceded by: Albert Jacobus Stals
- Succeeded by: A. J. R. van Rhijn (Health); Johannes Hendrikus Viljoen (Social Welfare)

Personal details
- Born: Karl Bremer; 27 April 1885 Hopefield, Cape Colony (now Western Cape, South Africa)
- Died: 18 July 1953 (aged 68) Cape Town, Cape Province, South Africa
- Party: National Party
- Education: University of Stellenbosch
- Occupation: Doctor and politician

Karl Bremer (27 April 1885 – 18 July 1953) was a medical doctor and a South African politician who became the Minister of Health and Social Welfare in South Africa in Dr D. F. Malan's cabinet.

== Early life ==
Bremer is of German ancestry, his father emigrated from Germany to Cape Colony shortly before his birth. Bremer was the only son, among a family of 7 children, of a physician on Hopefield in the Cape Colony. His father, also a doctor, died at the age of 45 while his son was only 8 years old.

His mother moved with her children to Wellington in the Western Cape where Bremer attended school at the Huguenot College. In 1903 he studied at the University of Stellenbosch, graduating with an honours in botany, and obtained a scholarship that allowed him to pursue medical studies in England. Bremer also studied at the University of Cornell in New York and at St Bartholomew's Hospital in London he studied to become a physician. He studied further at the University of Berlin. In 1930 he specialized in Berlin as an otorhinolaryngologist.

== Career ==
Bremer was a reputable doctor at a children's hospital before returning to Cradock with his sick mother. In 1910 Bremer established himself as a physician at Cradock in the Eastern Cape and was elected to the city council. During the First World War he served as a medical doctor for the South African troops in East Africa. He was then medical inspector of schools in the Cape Town province. He was a doctor in Cape Town during the 1918 flu epidemic. In February 1919 he established himself at Graaff-Reinet as a general practitioner.

In 1911 he was chosen as a member of the Cape Provincial Council. From 1924 to 1925 and again from 1929 to 1943 he served as deputy for the Graaff-Reinet constituent. In 1943, he changed constituency and became a member of Parliament for Stellenbosch. From January 1949 till March 1951 he served on the Senate, but in 1951 he was elected as representative of Ceres constituency. In February 1951 Dr. Albert Jacobus Stals, the minister of health and social welfare in Dr. D.F. Malan's cabinet died. Bremmer succeeded him in his post as minister and stayed representative of the Ceres constituency. In the 1953 general election, he won the seat of the Vasco constituency.

Bremer became known for the attention he gave to preventative healthcare, housing and nourishment, but did not succeed to lessen the provinces' regulation over hospitals and to shift regulation to the central government. Karl Bremer was a very active politician. He was the protector of less fortunate in society and always advocated for the advancement of rural areas. He placed his attention on welfare and preventative healthcare and advocated a national medical-care.

From 1939 Bremer was a member of the Medical Council of the Union of South Africa and in 1943 he became the President of the organization. From 1933 to 1948 he served as chairman of the National Party in the Cape Colony. He retired as a physician in 1947 for health reasons. He suffered a stroke causing a temporary aphasia.

The University of Stellenbosch elected him as vice-chancellor. In 1952 the University of Witwatersrand awarded him an honorary PhD. in law. The Karl Bremer Hospital in Bellville, Western Cape carries his name since its inauguration on June 30, 1956, by Jozua François Naudé.

Retired as Minister of Health, Bremer died on July 18, 1953, at the age of 68.

== Literature ==
- Botha, H.P., 1961. Meer as 'n dagtaak. Die lewe van Karl Bremer. Cape Town: HAUM (Publication number 4).
- Potgieter, D.J. 1970. Standard Encyclopaedia of Southern Africa, deel 2. Cape Town: National Educational Publishing House.
- Krüger, D. W., Beyers, C. J., & Human Sciences Research Council. (1977). Suid-Afrikaanse biografiese woordeboek: Deel III. Kaapstad: Tafelberg.
- Venter, E. A. (1980). 400 leiers in Suid-Afrika oor vier eeue: Beskouinge oor vierhonderd leierfigure in Suid-Afrika sedert die grondlegging. Potchefstroom: E.A. Venter. ISBN 0624008487
- SA Medical Journal, September 5, 1953, 778-779
