= Thomas Smartt =

South African politician (1858–1929)

The Right Honourable Sir Thomas Smartt KCMG
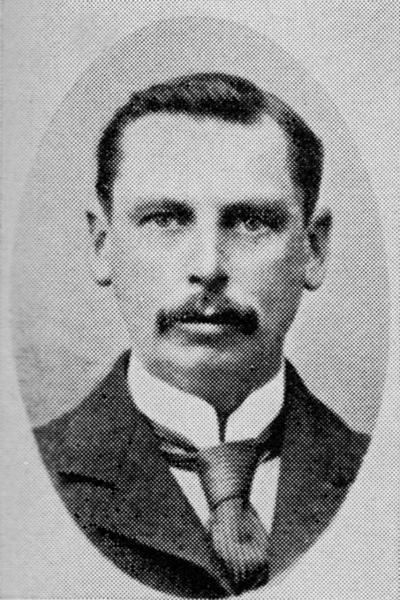

Minister of Agriculture
- In office 1921–1924
- Prime Minister: Jan Smuts
- Preceded by: F. S. Malan
- Succeeded by: Jan Kemp

Personal details
- Born: 22 February 1858
- Died: 17 April 1929 (aged 71)
- Education: Trinity College Dublin

Sir William Thomas Smartt, KCMG, PC (22 February 1858 - 17 April 1929) was an Irish-born South African politician, and founder and leader of the Unionist Party.

== Life ==
Smartt was born in Trim, County Meath, Ireland. He graduated in medicine at Trinity College Dublin in 1880 and left for South Africa where he went to Britstown as physician. A keen farmer, he later founded the Smartt Syndicate, one of the largest dams in the then Cape Colony at Houwater near Britstown. He kept good relationships with local farmers and was an enthusiastic member of the Afrikaner Bond.

Smartt was chairman of the commission called Scab in 1892 and his report led to the Organisation nominating him as their candidate for the constituency in Wodehouse in the 1894 general election. He took his place in the Cape Legislative Assembly. In 1897, when Rhodes's government fell, Smartt was interior minister in Sir Gordon Sprigg's cabinet. In 1898 the Sprigg government also collapsed and Smartt was a member of the Legislative Assembly to be elected in Cathcart. With the outbreak of the Anglo-Boer War in 1899 he was with Rhodes in Kimberley when it was besieged. He went on to become a commissioner in 1900 (Minister) for public works, but withdrew his support of Sprigg when the latter was opposed to the abolition of the Constitution. Smartt increased pressure for his claims to the premiership of Cape Colony in 1904 on Leander Starr Jameson, but was minister of lands and public works in Jameson's cabinet from 1904 to 1908.

As acting prime minister in 1905 he supported the expansion of the colony for white settlements in Kakamas and set up a select committee for the allocation of vacant Crown land to eligible applicants. From 1908 to 1909 Smartt member of the National Convention, paving the way for the Union in 1910. In 1911 he founded the British Unionist wing, the Official Opposition in Parliament to the South African Party. He followed Jameson as party leader in 1912. Meanwhile, as his first election after unification, he was elected as Member of Parliament for Fort Beaufort. He was returned in 1915 and again in 1920. In 1920, he signed a coalition agreement with General Jan Smuts and was minister of agriculture. When Jan Smuts was defeated in 1924, Smartt became as second in command of the Official Opposition.

He retired from politics before the 1929 election and died on 17 April that same year.
