= 1966 South African general election =

- 30 March 1966

All 166 general roll seats in the House of Assembly 84 seats needed for a majority
- Registered: 1,901,479
- Turnout: 68.48% (▲23.93pp)
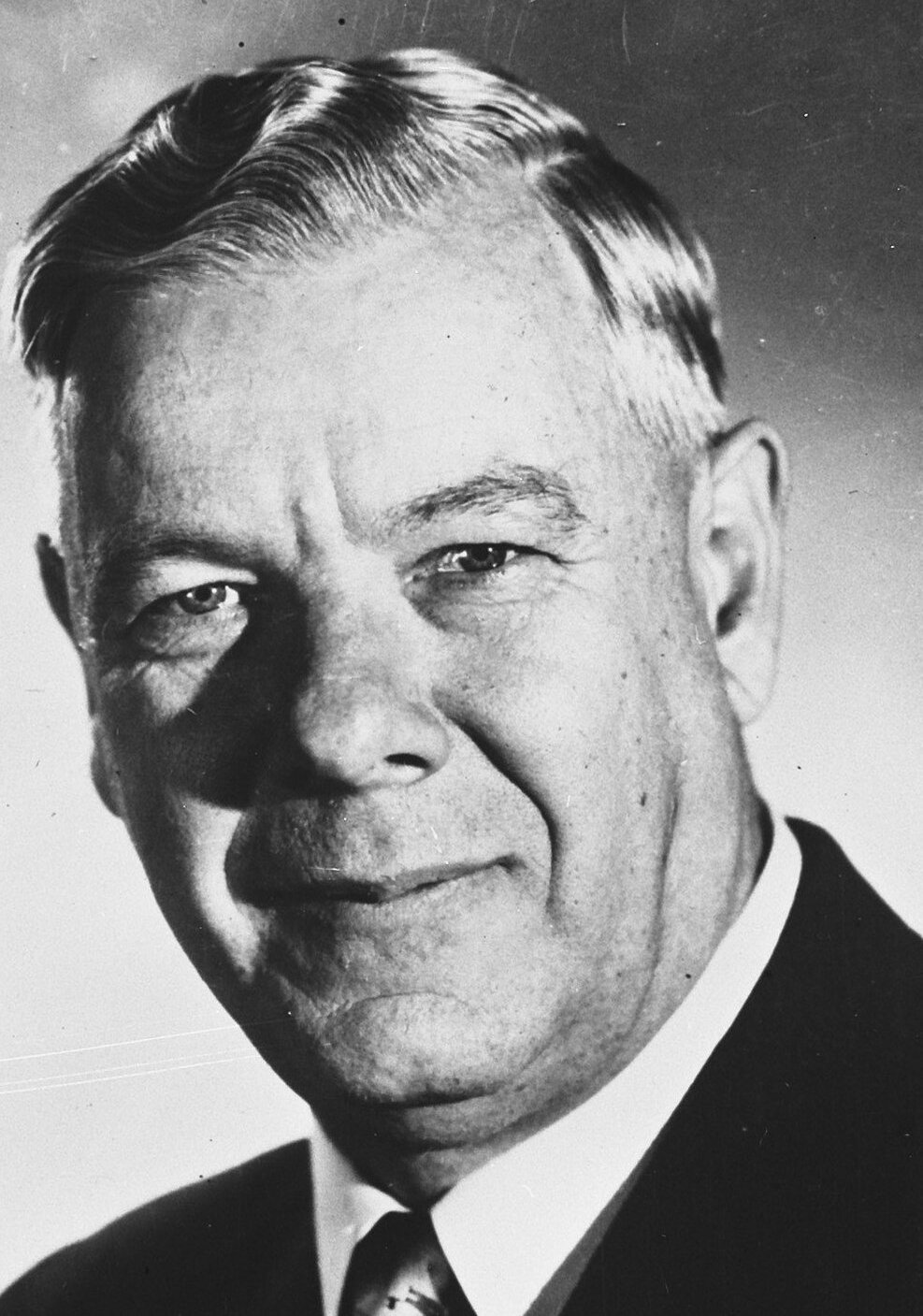

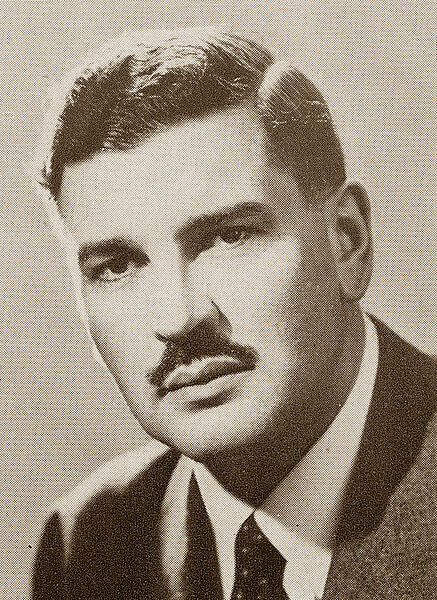

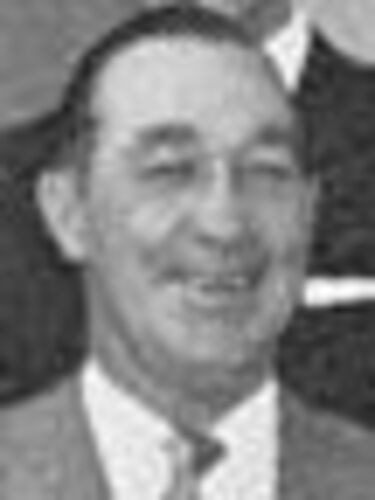
	First party	Second party	Third party
Leader	H. F. Verwoerd	De Villiers Graaff	Jan Steytler
Party	National	United	Progressive
Last election	46.44%, 105 seats	35.28%, 49 seats	8.66%, 1 seat
Seats won	126	39	1
Seat change	▲21	▼10	Steady
Popular vote	759,331	476,815	39,717
Percentage	58.31%	36.62%	3.05%
Swing	▲11.87pp	▲1.34pp	▼5.61pp
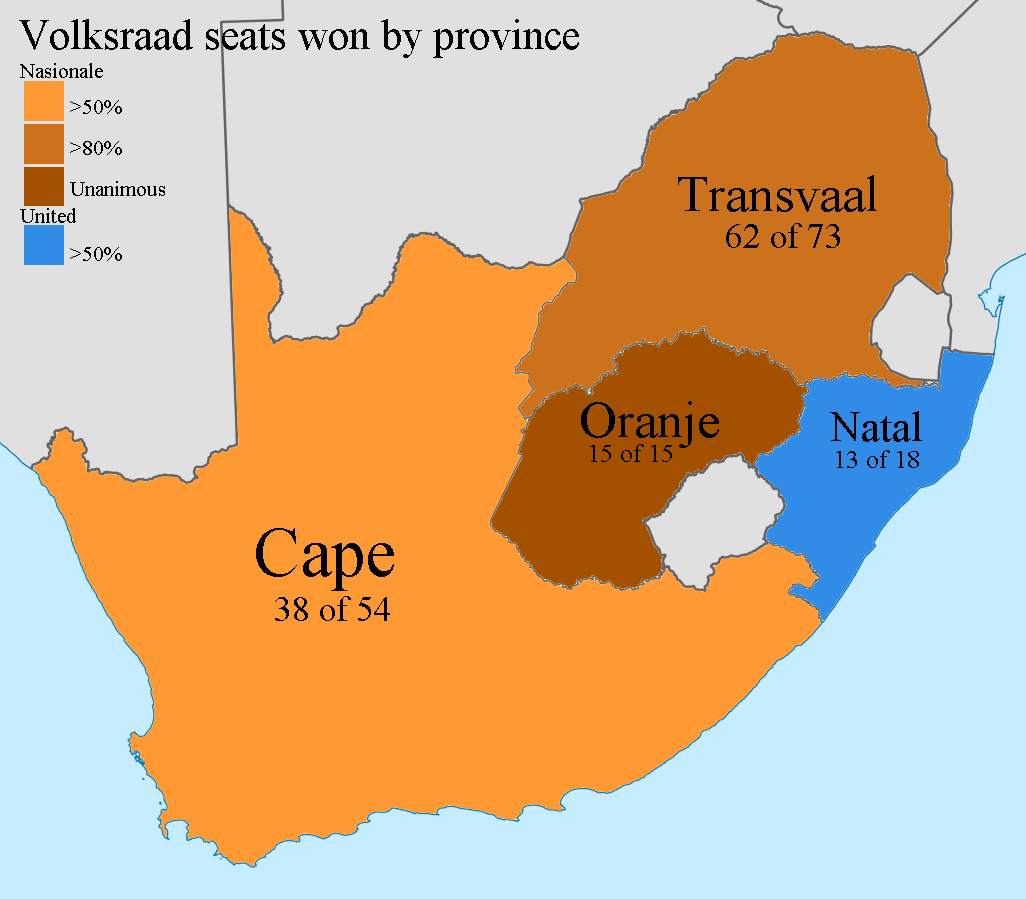
- Results by province
Prime Minister before election
H. F. Verwoerd
National
Elected Prime Minister
H. F. Verwoerd
National

General elections were held in South Africa on 30 March 1966. The result was another landslide victory for the National Party (NP) under H. F. Verwoerd. The election marked a major strengthening of power for the ruling NP, which gained a supermajority in parliament for the first time. The main opposition United Party (UP) slightly increased its share of the popular vote, but nevertheless saw its parliamentary representation considerably reduced.

The number of House of Assembly seats for White voters in South Africa had been increased from 150 to 160 by the Constitution Amendment Act of 1965. In addition, there were six seats for White voters from South-West Africa (now Namibia). There were also four seats reserved for Coloured representatives, who did not have to stand for re-election during 1966. On 6 September, several months after the elections, Prime Minister Verwoerd was assassinated.

== Coloured Representative Members ==
The second election for the four coloured representative members had taken place on 4 October 1961, before the (white voters only) general election on 8 October 1961. Under the Separate Representation of Voters Act 1951, the members had been elected to serve until the dissolution of the 1961–1966 parliament.

The Progressive Party (PP) won the two seats representing coloured voters on the Cape Provincial Council, at an election in 1965. The National Party (NP) government became concerned at the prospect of four additional Progressive MPs being elected. The opposition United Party (UP) also feared the loss of support, if the existing four UP supported independent members were defeated.

Parliament passed the Separate Representation of Voters Amendment Act 1965. This legislation extended the term of the existing coloured representatives until October 1966. Further Separate Representation of Voters Amendment Acts, in 1966 and 1968, extended the term until the dissolution of what turned out to be the 1966–1970 Parliament. The coloured representation in Parliament would then be abolished.

== Delimitation of electoral divisions ==
The South Africa Act 1909 had provided for a delimitation commission to define the boundaries for each electoral division, for general roll voters in the four provinces. The republican constitution continued the arrangements for a commission. The representation by province, under the twelfth delimitation report of 1965, is set out in the table below. The figures in brackets are the number of electoral divisions in the previous (1958) delimitation. If there is no figure in brackets then the number was unchanged.

Provinces	Cape	Natal	Orange Free State	Transvaal	Total
Divisions	54 (52)	18 (16)	15 (14)	73 (68)	160 (150)

South-West Africa (with six seats) and the coloured representatives (4 seats), were unaffected by the general delimitation provisions.

== Composition at dissolution ==
The 13th Parliament since the Union of 1910 and the 1st elected after the republic was proclaimed in 1961, was dissolved in 1966. At the time the House of Assembly consisted of two groups of members. White voters were represented by 156 general roll members and coloured voters in Cape Province by four white MPs known at the time as Coloured Representative Members (CRM).

The general election only affected the representatives of white voters. The other members were elected on a different date (see above).

Since the previous election, the United Party had absorbed the National Union, with which it had had an electoral alliance in 1961.

The representation by party and province, at the dissolution was:

Province	National	United	Progressive	Independents	Total
Cape (general)	34	18	–	–	52
Cape (CRM)	–	–	–	4	4
Natal	3	13	–	–	16
Orange Free State	14	–	–	–	14
South-West Africa	6	–	–	–	6
Transvaal	49	18	1	–	68
Total	106	49	1	4	160

== Results ==
A total of 356 candidates were nominated; 154 for the National Party, 141 for the United Party, 26 for the Progressive Party, 22 for the Republican Party, 10 for the Front Party, two independents and one Christian National Party. The Republican, Front and Conservative National groups were new right-wing parties, which had not contested previous general elections.

Eighteen candidates were returned unopposed, seventeen representing the National Party and one the United Party. The Progressive Party barely kept its Houghton seat, held by Helen Suzman since her defection from the UP, winning by 117 votes.

Party	Votes	%	Seats	+/–
National Party	759,331	58.31	126	+21
United Party	476,815	36.62	39	–10
Progressive Party	39,717	3.05	1	0
United National South West Party	9,814	0.75	0	0
Republican Party	8,212	0.63	0	New
Independent Party	5,800	0.45	0	New
Front Party	1,526	0.12	0	0
Christian National Party	936	0.07	0	New
Coloured Representative Members			4	0
Total	1,302,151	100.00	170	+10
Valid votes	1,302,151	99.43		
Invalid/blank votes	7,494	0.57		
Total votes	1,309,645	100.00		
Registered voters/turnout	1,901,479	68.88		

=== By province ===
Province	National	United	Progressive	Independents	Total
Cape (general)	38	16	0	0	54
Cape (CRM)	0	0	0	4	4
Natal	5	13	0	0	18
Orange Free State	15	0	0	0	15
South-West Africa	6	0	0	0	6
Transvaal	62	10	1	0	73
Total	126	39	1	4	170
