= Representation of Natives Act, 1936 =

South African legislation

Parliament of South Africa
- Long title: Act to make special provision for the representation of natives in Parliament and in the provincial council of the Province of the Cape of Good Hope and to that end to amend the law in force in that province relating to the registration of natives as voters for Parliament or a provincial council; to establish a Natives Representative Council for the Union; and to provide for other incidental matters.
- Citation: Act No. 12 of 1936
- Enacted by: Parliament of South Africa
- Royal assent: 20 April 1936
- Commenced: 10 July 1936
- Repealed: 19 June 1959
- Administered by: Minister of Native Affairs

Repealed by
- Promotion of Bantu Self-government Act, 1959

Related legislation
- Separate Representation of Voters Act, 1951
- Status: Repealed

The Representation of Natives Act No 12 of 1936 (commenced 10 July) was legislation passed in South Africa which further reduced black rights at the time. The Cape province had a qualified franchise which had allowed a small number of blacks in the Cape to vote for the common roll (although not to sit in parliament) in terms of the Cape Qualified Franchise. The qualified franchise dated back to the pre-Union period, when the Cape was a separate British colony; it also excluded poorer white men. The 1936 Act removed blacks to a separate roll – and halted the right to run for office; other earlier legislation removed the qualifications imposed in the Cape on whites.

With this act, the small black elite - most blacks never had the vote - were removed from the common rolls on which they had been able to register since 1854. Chiefs, local councils, urban advisory boards and election committees in all provinces were to elect four whites to the senate by a system of block voting. The act also created a Native Representative Council of six white officials, four nominated and twelve elected Africans. In 1937, an official report, which was not followed up, recommended that Coloureds be included on the ordinary electoral lists of the four provinces, thus giving them voting rights equal to those of whites throughout South Africa and not just in the Cape Province.

== Repeal ==
This Act was repealed on 19 June 1959 by the Promotion of Bantu Self-government Act, 1959.

== See also ==
- Category:Apartheid laws in South Africa
- Apartheid in South Africa
