= Franchise and Ballot Act =

Legislation that raised the property requirement for the franchise in South Africa

The Franchise and Ballot Act (1892) was an act of the Cape Colony Parliament, driven by Prime Minister Cecil Rhodes, which raised the property franchise qualification from £25 to £75, thus disenfranchising a large proportion of the Cape's non-white voters, and a number of poor white voters.

It was a significant early step in overturning the Cape's liberal and multi-racial constitution.

== Background ==
The Cape Colony had a system of franchise that was open to men of all races, dating back to its early constitution in 1853 and its achievement of "Responsible Government" in 1872. Under this system, the right to vote was based on £25 property franchise regardless of race.

In the ensuing decade, increasing numbers of the Cape's Black African citizens became politically active. By the 1880s, the Cape's Prime Minister Cecil Rhodes was disturbed by the prospect that white politicians may eventually be sidelined in many Cape Constituencies where non-white voters formed a majority. As more and more African citizens exercised their right to vote under the law as it existed, their vote looked to soon be decisive.

The Cape Colony was also unique of all the countries in southern Africa for its multi-racial franchise. At this time in the Transvaal and the Orange Free State indigenous Africans had no voting rights, and in Natal very few non-whites had the right to vote.

== Immediate effects ==
The Cape Colony's Franchise and Ballot Act of 1892 raised the franchise qualifications from £25 to £75, which effectively disenfranchised non-whites in significant enough numbers to make their voting powers negligible, but some poor whites were disenfranchised too.

== Long-term effects ==
This legislation settled the disputes as to whether non-whites had voting power in Cape Colony in the late 19th century, and is recognized as being an early example of legislation motivated by racial discrimination, although the law itself achieved its racially discriminatory aims only indirectly, through financially based clauses.

== See also ==
History of Cape Colony from 1870 to 1899
