= Cape Provincial Council =

Government of Cape Province, South Africa

The Cape Provincial Council was the provincial council of the Cape Province of South Africa. It was created by the South Africa Act 1909, with effect from the formation of the Union of South Africa on 31 May 1910. The first election to the provincial council took place on 15 September 1910 (also the day of the South African general election, 1910).

The provincial council continued to exist until 1986, when its functions were transferred to a strengthened executive authority appointed by the State President. The province itself was disbanded in 1994, when the provinces were reconstructed.

== Election system and terms ==
The provincial council was composed of members elected, by the first past the post electoral system, from single member electoral divisions. Provinces (like Cape Province) with more than 25 general roll seats in the House of Assembly used the same boundaries for provincial council elections as well.

Until 1930 the Provincial Council was elected under the colour-blind Cape Qualified Franchise. Subsequently, rights accorded by this franchise were gradually eroded. After 1936 in addition to the general roll electoral divisions, some additional provincial council seats were created in Cape Province for periods when black and coloured voters were still enfranchised, but had been removed from the general roll. This policy was effected (for black voters) by the Representation of Native Act 1936 and (for coloured voters) by the Separate Representation of Voters Act 1951.

Originally the term of the provincial council was five years, from the first meeting of the council after it was elected. The administrator of the province fixed the date for the meeting, but the provincial council had to meet at least once a year. The South African Parliament could alter the term by legislation (as it did when the provincial elections due in 1941 were postponed until 1943), but there was no general power to dissolve a provincial council before its statutory term expired.

Under the Constitution and Elections Amendment Act 1973, the State President was given the power to dissolve the provincial councils at the same time as the House of Assembly, so that the subsequent provincial election could take place on the same day as a parliamentary general election.

== Executive committee ==
Executive powers were shared by the administrator and an executive committee. This arrangement was neither the traditional 'Westminster' model (such as that which existed at the Union level of government) or a United States style separation of powers between the executive and legislative parts of the government.

The administrator of the province was described, in section 68 (1) of the South Africa Act 1909, as "a chief executive officer … in whose name all executive acts relating to provincial affairs therein shall be done".

The administrator was appointed, by the national government, for a five-year term and could not be removed except by the Governor General for "cause assigned". The administrator was not responsible to the provincial council and it had no power to remove him from office. The administrator was the chairman of the provincial executive committee and had both an original and casting vote in its deliberations.

The provincial council elected four persons (usually members of the provincial council), who together with the administrator formed the provincial executive committee. The four members were elected by single transferable vote, so were not necessarily all from the same party.

It was provided, by Section 80 of the South Africa Act 1909, that "the executive committee shall on behalf of the provincial council carry on the administration of provincial affairs'’.

== Election results, by party 1917 and 1935-1981 ==
Election	National Party	South African Party	Unionist Party	Total
1917	15	11	19	45

Election	NP	UP	Lab	PFP	Dom	Ind	SAP	Others	Total
1935	20	32	-	-	-	-	-	9	61
1943	18	34	2	-	1	1	-	-	56
1949	26	28	1	-	-	-	-	-	55
1954	30	24	-	-	-	-	-	2	56
1959	33	21	-	-	-	-	-	-	54
1965	35	17	-	2	-	-	-	-	54
1970	36	18	-	-	-	-	-	-	54
1974	37	17	-	1	-	-	-	-	55
1977	44	2	-	6	-	-	3	-	55
1981	44	1	-	10	-	-	-	-	55

Key to parties:-

- NP: Purified National Party (1935), Reunited National Party (1943–1949), National Party (1954–1981)
- UP: United Party (1935–1974), New Republic Party (1977–1981)
- Lab: South African Labour Party
- PFP: Progressive Party (1965–1974), Progressive Federal Party (1977–1981)
- Dom Dominion Party
- Ind Independent
- SAP South African Party
- Others Vacant seat
