= Results of the 1910 South African general election =

- 15 September 1910

All 121 seats in the House of Assembly 61 seats needed for a majority
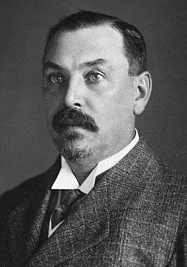

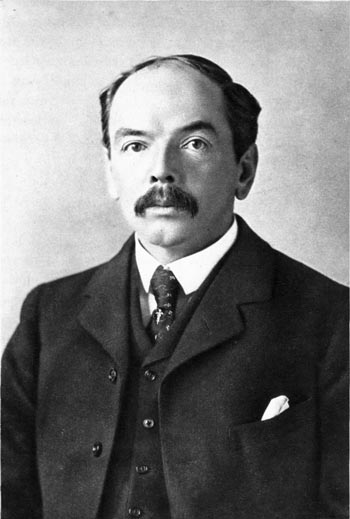

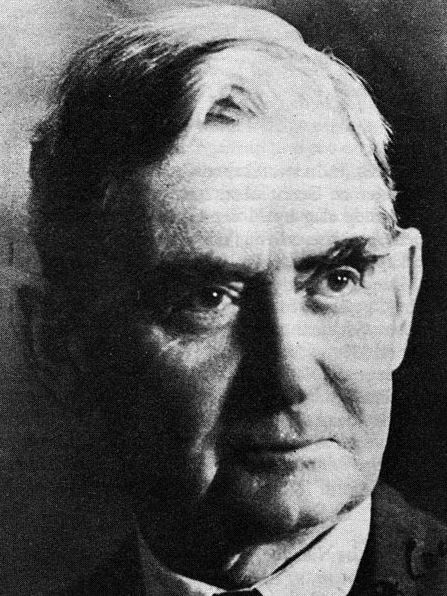
	First party	Second party	Third party
Leader	Louis Botha	Leander Starr Jameson	Frederic Creswell
Party	South African, Orangia Unie, and Het Volk	Unionist	Labour
Leader's seat	stood in Pretoria East	Albany	Jeppes
Seats won	66	36	3
Popular vote	30,052	39,766	11,549
Percentage	28.45%	37.65%	10.93%
Elected Prime Minister
Louis Botha
South African

This is a list of constituency results for the 1910 South African general election.

== Cape Province ==
Party	Votes	%	Seats
Unionist Party	15,269	40.99	18
South African Party	9,780	26.26	29
Labour Party	1,510	4.05	0
Socialist Party	296	0.79	0
Independent South African Party	3,053	8.20	0
Independent Unionist Party			2
Independents	7,340	19.71	2
Total	37,248	100.00	51
Source: Schoeman

Unopposed candidates: South African Party 20, Unionists 6, Independent Unionists 2, Independent 1.

=== Albany ===
General election 1910: Albany
Party	Candidate	Votes	%	±%
Unionist	Leander Starr Jameson	Unopposed		
Unionist win (new seat)				

=== Albert ===
General election 1910: Albert
Party	Candidate	Votes	%	±%
South African	Henry Burton	Unopposed		
South African win (new seat)				

=== Aliwal ===
General election 1910: Aliwal
Party	Candidate	Votes	%	±%
South African	Jacobus Wilhelmus Sauer	Unopposed		
South African win (new seat)				

=== Barkly ===
General election 1910: Barkly
Party	Candidate	Votes	%	±%
Unionist	Arnold Hirst Watkins	Unopposed		
Unionist win (new seat)				

=== Beaconsfield ===
General election 1910: Beaconsfield
Party	Candidate	Votes	%	±%
Independent	David Harris	Unopposed		
Independent win (new seat)				

=== Beaufort West ===
General election 1910: Beaufort West
Party	Candidate	Votes	%	±%
South African	Andrew Murray Neethling	Unopposed		
South African win (new seat)				

=== Bechuanaland ===
General election 1910: Bechuanaland
Party	Candidate	Votes	%	±%
South African	Daniel Hendrik Willem Wessels	Unopposed		
South African win (new seat)				

=== Border ===
General election 1910: Border
Party	Candidate	Votes	%	±%
Unionist	George Blaine	Unopposed		
Unionist win (new seat)				

=== Caledon ===
General election 1910: Caledon
Party	Candidate	Votes	%	±%
South African	Christman Joel Krige	Unopposed		
South African win (new seat)				

=== Cape Town Castle ===
General election 1910: Cape Town Castle
Party	Candidate	Votes	%	±%
Unionist	Morris Alexander	1,273	61.6	New
Independent	B. Upington	571	27.6	New
South African	R. Forsyth	224	10.8	New
Majority		702	34.0	N/A
Unionist win (new seat)				

=== Cape Town Central ===
General election 1910: Cape Town Central
Party	Candidate	Votes	%	±%
Unionist	John William Jagger	1,695	85.1	New
Socialist	Arthur W. Noon	296	14.9	New
Majority		1,399	70.2	N/A
Unionist win (new seat)				

=== Cape Town Gardens ===
General election 1910: Cape Town Gardens
Party	Candidate	Votes	%	±%
Unionist	William Duncan Baxter	1,269	60.4	New
Independent	Hyman Liberman	831	39.6	New
Majority		438	20.8	N/A
Unionist win (new seat)				

=== Cape Town Harbour ===
General election 1910: Cape Town Harbour
Party	Candidate	Votes	%	±%
Unionist	Leander Starr Jameson	1,414	70.1	New
South African	J. W. Herbert	602	29.9	New
Majority		812	40.2	N/A
Unionist win (new seat)				

=== Ceres ===
General election 1910: Ceres
Party	Candidate	Votes	%	±%
South African	James Tennant Molteno	Unopposed		
South African win (new seat)				

=== Clanwilliam ===
General election 1910: Clanwilliam
Party	Candidate	Votes	%	±%
South African	Egidius Benedictus Watermeyer	1,055	57.1	New
Ind. South African	D. van Zyl	792	42.9	New
Majority		263	14.2	N/A
South African win (new seat)				

=== Colesberg ===
General election 1910: Colesberg
Party	Candidate	Votes	%	±%
South African	George Albertyn Louw	Unopposed		
South African win (new seat)				

=== Cradock ===
General election 1910: Cradock
Party	Candidate	Votes	%	±%
South African	Hercules Christiaan van Heerden	Unopposed		
South African win (new seat)				

=== East London ===
General election 1910: East London
Party	Candidate	Votes	%	±%
Unionist	Charles Preston Crewe	1,331	67.1	New
Independent	J. A. Goldsmith	651	32.9	New
Majority		680	34.2	N/A
Unionist win (new seat)				

=== Fort Beaufort ===
General election 1910: Fort Beaufort
Party	Candidate	Votes	%	±%
Unionist	Thomas William Smartt	Unopposed		
Unionist win (new seat)				

=== George ===
General election 1910: George
Party	Candidate	Votes	%	±%
South African	Henry Latham Currey	Unopposed		
South African win (new seat)				

=== Graaff-Reinet ===
General election 1910: Graaff-Reinet
Party	Candidate	Votes	%	±%
South African	Gysbert Henry Maasdorp	1,423	82.5	New
Ind. South African	P. B. de Ville	302	17.5	New
Majority		1,121	65.0	N/A
South African win (new seat)				

=== Griqualand ===
General election 1910: Griqualand
Party	Candidate	Votes	%	±%
Unionist	John Gavin King	877	56.5	New
Independent	C. E. Todd	675	43.5	New
Majority		202	13.0	N/A
Unionist win (new seat)				

=== Hopetown ===
General election 1910: Hopetown
Party	Candidate	Votes	%	±%
South African	Hendrik Lodewyk Aucamp	Unopposed		
South African win (new seat)				

=== Humansdorp ===
General election 1910: Humansdorp
Party	Candidate	Votes	%	±%
South African	Jacobus Michael Rademeyer	1,168	54.3	New
Ind. South African	J. A. L. de Waal	983	45.7	New
Majority		185	8.6	N/A
South African win (new seat)				

=== Jansenville ===
General election 1910: Jansenville
Party	Candidate	Votes	%	±%
South African	Ockert Almero Oosthuizen	Unopposed		
South African win (new seat)				

=== Kimberley ===
General election 1910: Kimberley
Party	Candidate	Votes	%	±%
Unionist	Henry Alfred Oliver	1,121	65.7	New
Labour	James Farquharson Trembath	584	34.3	New
Majority		537	31.4	N/A
Unionist win (new seat)				

=== King William's Town ===
General election 1910: King William's Town
Party	Candidate	Votes	%	±%
Ind. Unionist	George Whitaker	Unopposed		
Ind. Unionist win (new seat)				

=== Ladismith ===
General election 1910: Ladismith
Party	Candidate	Votes	%	±%
South African	Heinrich Christian Becker	Unopposed		
South African win (new seat)				

=== Liesbeek ===
General election 1910: Liesbeek
Party	Candidate	Votes	%	±%
Unionist	Basil Kellett Long	1,029	51.7	New
South African	C. A. Lageson	540	27.1	New
Independent	E. P. Reilly	420	21.1	New
Majority		489	24.6	N/A
Unionist win (new seat)				

=== Malmesbury ===
General election 1910: Malmesbury
Party	Candidate	Votes	%	±%
South African	François Stephanus Malan	Unopposed		
South African win (new seat)				

=== Namaqualand ===
General election 1910: Namaqualand
Party	Candidate	Votes	%	±%
South African	David Pieter de Villiers Graaff	Unopposed		
South African win (new seat)				

=== Newlands ===
General election 1910: Newlands
Party	Candidate	Votes	%	±%
Unionist	Charles Frederick William Struben	1,083	62.7	New
Independent	L. A. W. Beck	643	37.3	New
Majority		440	25.4	N/A
Unionist win (new seat)				

=== Oudtshoorn ===
General election 1910: Oudtshoorn
Party	Candidate	Votes	%	±%
South African	Johannes Hendrik Schoeman	1,209	64.4	New
Independent	E. Edmeades	668	35.6	New
Majority		541	28.8	N/A
South African win (new seat)				

=== Paarl ===
General election 1910: Paarl
Party	Candidate	Votes	%	±%
South African	Andries Lourens de Jager	1,218	50.7	New
Independent	S. P. H. de Villiers	1,185	49.3	New
Majority		33	1.4	N/A
South African win (new seat)				

=== Piketberg ===
General election 1910: Piketberg
Party	Candidate	Votes	%	±%
South African	Michiel Johannes de Beer	Unopposed		
South African win (new seat)				

=== Port Elizabeth Central ===
General election 1910: Port Elizabeth Central
Party	Candidate	Votes	%	±%
Unionist	Edgar Harris Walton	Unopposed		
Unionist win (new seat)				

=== Port Elizabeth Southwest ===
General election 1910: Port Elizabeth Southwest
Party	Candidate	Votes	%	±%
Independent	James Searle	Unopposed		
Independent win (new seat)				

=== Prieska ===
General election 1910: Prieska
Party	Candidate	Votes	%	±%
South African	Pieter Gysbert Kuhn	Unopposed		
South African win (new seat)				

=== Queenstown ===
General election 1910: Queenstown
Party	Candidate	Votes	%	±%
Unionist	William Bisset Berry	1,156	55.1	New
Independent	J. Searle	942	44.9	New
Majority		214	10.2	N/A
Unionist win (new seat)				

=== Riversdale ===
General election 1910: Riversdale
Party	Candidate	Votes	%	±%
South African	Alwyn Ignatius Vintcent	Unopposed		
South African win (new seat)				

=== Somerset ===
General election 1910: Somerset
Party	Candidate	Votes	%	±%
South African	Johannes Arnoldus Vosloo	Unopposed		
South African win (new seat)				

=== South Peninsula ===
General election 1910: South Peninsula
Party	Candidate	Votes	%	±%
Unionist	William Runciman	1,153	58.4	New
Independent	H. Cloete	754	38.2	New
South African	C. W. B. Molteno	68	3.4	New
Majority		399	20.2	N/A
Unionist win (new seat)				

=== Stellenbosch ===
General election 1910: Stellenbosch
Party	Candidate	Votes	%	±%
South African	Johannes Henoch Marais	1,134	53.7	New
Ind. South African	W. A. Krige	976	46.3	New
Majority		158	7.4	N/A
South African win (new seat)				

=== Swellendam ===
General election 1910: Swellendam
Party	Candidate	Votes	%	±%
South African	Jacobus Willem van Eeden	Unopposed		
South African win (new seat)				

=== Tembuland ===
General election 1910: Tembuland
Party	Candidate	Votes	%	±%
Ind. Unionist	Theophilus Lyndall Schreiner	Unopposed		
Ind. Unionist win (new seat)				

=== Three Rivers ===
General election 1910: Three Rivers
Party	Candidate	Votes	%	±%
Unionist	Daniel Maclaren Brown	Unopposed		
Unionist win (new seat)				

=== Uitenhage ===
General election 1910: Uitenhage
Party	Candidate	Votes	%	±%
South African	Henry Eardley Stephen Fremantle	1,139	55.4	New
Unionist	C. W. Mackay	917	44.6	New
Majority		222	10.8	N/A
South African win (new seat)				

=== Victoria West ===
General election 1910: Victoria West
Party	Candidate	Votes	%	±%
South African	John Xavier Merriman	Unopposed		
South African win (new seat)				

=== Wodehouse ===
General election 1910: Wodehouse
Party	Candidate	Votes	%	±%
South African	Jan Abraham Venter	Unopposed		
South African win (new seat)				

=== Woodstock ===
General election 1910: Woodstock
Party	Candidate	Votes	%	±%
Unionist	John Hewat	951	50.6	New
Labour	Thomas Maginess	926	49.4	New
Majority		25	1.2	N/A
Unionist win (new seat)				

=== Worcester ===
General election 1910: Worcester
Party	Candidate	Votes	%	±%
South African	Charles Beeton Heatlie	Unopposed		
South African win (new seat)				

== Natal ==
Party	Votes	%	Seats
Unionist Party	2,811	15.99	5
South African Party	2,743	15.60	1
Labour Party	2,492	14.18	0
Socialist Party	119	0.68	0
Independent South African Party	377	2.14	1
Independents	9,036	51.41	10
Total	17,578	100.00	17
Source: Schoeman

Unopposed candidates: Independent 1.

=== Dundee ===
General election 1910: Dundee
Party	Candidate	Votes	%	±%
Independent	Thomas Watt	749	61.9	New
South African	W. Springorum	291	24.1	New
South African	P. R. N. Vermaak	170	14.1	New
Majority		458	37.8	N/A
Independent win (new seat)				

=== Durban Berea ===
General election 1910: Durban Berea
Party	Candidate	Votes	%	±%
Independent	James Henderson	Unopposed		
Independent win (new seat)				

=== Durban Central ===
General election 1910: Durban Central
Party	Candidate	Votes	%	±%
Unionist	David Hunter	660	50.8	New
Independent	H. Whiteman	285	22.0	New
Labour	Henry Ancketill	227	17.5	New
South African	W. D. Cunningham	126	9.7	New
Majority		385	28.8	N/A
Unionist win (new seat)				

=== Durban Greyville ===
General election 1910: Durban Greyville
Party	Candidate	Votes	%	±%
Independent	John George Maydon	910	64.0	New
Labour	Thomas Boydell	511	36.0	New
Majority		399	28.0	N/A
Independent win (new seat)				

=== Durban Point ===
General election 1910: Durban Point
Party	Candidate	Votes	%	±%
Unionist	Percy Arthur Baxter Silburn	788	58.7	New
Labour	Charles Henry Knowler	554	41.3	New
Majority		234	17.4	N/A
Unionist win (new seat)				

=== Durban Umbilo ===
General election 1910: Durban Umbilo
Party	Candidate	Votes	%	±%
Unionist	Charles Phineas Robinson	788	58.7	New
Labour	F. T. Powrie	554	41.3	New
Majority		234	17.4	N/A
Unionist win (new seat)				

=== Durban Umlazi ===
General election 1910: Durban Umlazi
Party	Candidate	Votes	%	±%
Independent	Alfred Fawcus	327	34.8	New
Labour	H. Humphrey	296	31.5	New
Unionist	J. Morley	158	16.8	New
Independent	C. Saunders	132	14.1	New
Independent	J. W. McKenzie	23	2.4	New
Unionist	T. Fletcher	3	0.3	New
Majority		31	3.3	N/A
Independent win (new seat)				

=== Klip River ===
General election 1910: Klip River
Party	Candidate	Votes	%	±%
Independent	Henry Wiltshire	493	50.2	New
Independent	T. Hyslop	489	49.8	New
Majority		4	0.4	N/A
Independent win (new seat)				

=== Newcastle ===
General election 1910: Newcastle
Party	Candidate	Votes	%	±%
South African	Hendrik Johannes Bosman	533	53.0	New
Independent	E. W. Noyce	473	47.0	New
Majority		60	6.0	N/A
South African win (new seat)				

=== Pietermaritzburg North ===
General election 1910: Pietermaritzburg North
Party	Candidate	Votes	%	±%
Independent	Thomas Orr	871	60.2	New
Labour	Nelson Palmer	576	39.8	New
Majority		295	20.4	N/A
Independent win (new seat)				

=== Pietermaritzburg South ===
General election 1910: Pietermaritzburg South
Party	Candidate	Votes	%	±%
Independent	William Henry Griffin	519	38.2	New
Independent	C. Yonge	357	26.3	New
Independent	M. O'Meara	290	21.4	New
Socialist	R. Shaw	119	8.8	New
Unionist	L. H. Green	72	5.3	New
Majority		162	8.9	N/A
Independent win (new seat)				

=== Umvoti ===
General election 1910: Umvoti
Party	Candidate	Votes	%	±%
Independent	George Leuchars	766	63.1	New
South African	William Arthur Deane	447	36.9	New
Majority		319	26.2	N/A
Independent win (new seat)				

=== Umzimkulu ===
General election 1910: Umzimkulu
Party	Candidate	Votes	%	±%
Independent	Frank Reynolds	534	58.6	New
South African	J. Kirkaman	377	41.4	New
Majority		157	17.2	N/A
Independent win (new seat)				

=== Victoria County ===
General election 1910: Victoria County
Party	Candidate	Votes	%	±%
Unionist	Charles Henwood	635	64.8	New
Independent	George Shearer Armstrong	345	35.2	New
Majority		234	29.6	N/A
Unionist win (new seat)				

=== Vryheid ===
General election 1910: Vryheid
Party	Candidate	Votes	%	±%
Ind. South African	Marthinus Wilhelmus Myburgh	377	50.0	New
South African	B. E. A. Rabe	377	50.0	New
Majority		0	0.0	N/A
South African win (new seat)				

Election decided by lot.

=== Weenen ===
General election 1910: Weenen
Party	Candidate	Votes	%	±%
Unionist	Hugh Mowbray Meyler	495	52.4	New
South African	Frederick Robert Moor	450	47.6	New
Majority		45	4.8	N/A
Unionist win (new seat)				

=== Zululand ===
General election 1910: Zululand
Party	Candidate	Votes	%	±%
Independent	Walter Frederick Clayton	543	56.3	New
South African	A. E. Brunner	422	43.7	New
Majority		121	12.6	N/A
Independent win (new seat)				

== Orange Free State ==
Party	Votes	%	Seats
Orangia Unie	4,044	56.96	16
Unionist Party	1,691	23.82	1
Labour Party	146	2.06	0
Independents	1,219	17.17	0
Total	7,100	100.00	17
Source: Schoeman

Unopposed candidates: Orangia Unie 12.

=== Bethlehem ===
General election 1910: Bethlehem
Party	Candidate	Votes	%	±%
Orangia Unie	Abraham Fischer	Unopposed		
Orangia Unie win (new seat)				

=== Bloemfontein ===
General election 1910: Bloemfontein
Party	Candidate	Votes	%	±%
Unionist	Christian Lourens Botha	863	51.9	New
Orangia Unie	W. Ehrlich	653	39.3	New
Labour	John Duff	146	8.8	New
Majority		310	12.6	N/A
Unionist win (new seat)				

=== Bloemfontein District ===
General election 1910: Bloemfontein District
Party	Candidate	Votes	%	±%
Orangia Unie	Johannes Petrus Gerhardus Steyl	897	52.0	New
Unionist	D. G. Falck	828	48.0	New
Majority		69	4.0	N/A
Orangia Unie win (new seat)				

=== Boshof ===
General election 1910: Boshof
Party	Candidate	Votes	%	±%
Orangia Unie	Christiaan Andries van Niekerk	Unopposed		
Orangia Unie win (new seat)				

=== Edenburg ===
General election 1910: Edenburg
Party	Candidate	Votes	%	±%
Orangia Unie	Evert Nicolaas Grobler	Unopposed		
Orangia Unie win (new seat)				

=== Fauresmith ===
General election 1910: Fauresmith
Party	Candidate	Votes	%	±%
Orangia Unie	Carl Theodorus Muller Wilcocks	Unopposed		
Orangia Unie win (new seat)				

=== Ficksburg ===
General election 1910: Ficksburg
Party	Candidate	Votes	%	±%
Orangia Unie	Jan Garhard Keyter	993	70.4	New
Independent	C. Newberry	418	29.6	New
Majority		575	40.8	N/A
Orangia Unie win (new seat)				

=== Frankfort ===
General election 1910: Frankfort
Party	Candidate	Votes	%	±%
Orangia Unie	Thomas Phillip Brain	Unopposed		
Orangia Unie win (new seat)				

=== Harrismith ===
General election 1910: Harrismith
Party	Candidate	Votes	%	±%
Orangia Unie	Izaak Johannes Meyer	Unopposed		
Orangia Unie win (new seat)				

=== Heilbron ===
General election 1910: Heilbron
Party	Candidate	Votes	%	±%
Orangia Unie	Petrus Jacobus George Theron	788	71.6	New
Independent	J. Pierce	312	28.4	New
Majority		476	43.2	N/A
Orangia Unie win (new seat)				

=== Hoopstad ===
General election 1910: Hoopstad
Party	Candidate	Votes	%	±%
Orangia Unie	Hendrik Schalk Theron	Unopposed		
Orangia Unie win (new seat)				

=== Kroonstad ===
General election 1910: Kroonstad
Party	Candidate	Votes	%	±%
Orangia Unie	Daniel Johannes Serfontein	713	59.3	New
Independent	N. Blignaut	489	40.7	New
Majority		224	18.6	N/A
Orangia Unie win (new seat)				

=== Ladybrand ===
General election 1910: Ladybrand
Party	Candidate	Votes	%	±%
Orangia Unie	Charles Gustav Fichardt	Unopposed		
Orangia Unie win (new seat)				

=== Rouxville ===
General election 1910: Rouxville
Party	Candidate	Votes	%	±%
Orangia Unie	George Louis Steytler	Unopposed		
Orangia Unie win (new seat)				

=== Smithfield ===
General election 1910: Smithfield
Party	Candidate	Votes	%	±%
Orangia Unie	James Barry Munnik Hertzog	Unopposed		
Orangia Unie win (new seat)				

=== Vredefort ===
General election 1910: Vredefort
Party	Candidate	Votes	%	±%
Orangia Unie	Johannes Adolph Philippus van der Merwe	Unopposed		
Orangia Unie win (new seat)				

=== Winburg ===
General election 1910: Winburg
Party	Candidate	Votes	%	±%
Orangia Unie	Frederik Reinhardt Cronjé	Unopposed		
Orangia Unie win (new seat)				

== Transvaal ==
Party	Votes	%	Seats
Unionist Party	19,995	45.76	12
Het Volk	13,485	30.86	20
Labour Party	7,401	16.94	3
Socialist Party	33	0.08	0
Independent Labour Party	815	1.87	1
Independents	1,968	4.50	0
Total	43,697	100.00	36
Source: Schoeman

Unopposed candidates: Het Volk 12.

=== Barberton ===
General election 1910: Barberton
Party	Candidate	Votes	%	±%
Het Volk	Joseph Petrus Jooste	836	62.0	New
Unionist	D. Drew	513	38.0	New
Majority		323	24.0	N/A
Het Volk win (new seat)				

=== Boksburg ===
General election 1910: Boksburg
Party	Candidate	Votes	%	±%
Unionist	James Campbell-MacNeillie	1,109	62.0	New
Het Volk	C. B. Mussared	680	38.0	New
Majority		429	24.0	N/A
Unionist win (new seat)				

=== Braamfontein ===
General election 1910: Braamfontein
Party	Candidate	Votes	%	±%
Unionist	Aubrey Woolls-Sampson	1,185	60.5	New
Het Volk	Herbert Boshof Papenfus	775	39.5	New
Majority		410	21.0	N/A
Unionist win (new seat)				

=== Commissioner Street ===
General election 1910: Commissioner Street
Party	Candidate	Votes	%	±%
Labour	Henry William Sampson	924	50.4	New
Unionist	R. Curry	884	48.3	New
Socialist	James Davidson	25	1.4	New
Majority		80	2.1	N/A
Labour win (new seat)				

=== Denver ===
General election 1910: Denver
Party	Candidate	Votes	%	±%
Unionist	Donald Macaulay	866	57.1	New
Labour	T. Landye	652	42.9	New
Majority		214	14.2	N/A
Unionist win (new seat)				

=== Ermelo ===
General election 1910: Ermelo
Party	Candidate	Votes	%	±%
Het Volk	Tobias Smuts	Unopposed		
Het Volk win (new seat)				

=== Fordsburg ===
General election 1910: Fordsburg
Party	Candidate	Votes	%	±%
Unionist	Patrick Duncan	590	35.5	New
Het Volk	Frederick Edward Traugott Krause	544	32.7	New
Labour	William Henry Andrews	520	31.3	New
Socialist	Archibald Crawford	8	0.5	New
Majority		46	2.8	N/A
Unionist win (new seat)				

=== Georgetown ===
General election 1910: Georgetown
Party	Candidate	Votes	%	±%
Unionist	George Herbert Farrar	1,109	55.1	New
Het Volk	Henry Charles Hull	515	25.6	New
Labour	Tom Matthews	388	19.3	New
Majority		594	29.5	N/A
Unionist win (new seat)				

=== Germiston ===
General election 1910: Germiston
Party	Candidate	Votes	%	±%
Unionist	Francis Drummond Percy Chaplin	1,114	57.7	New
Labour	J. Coward	816	42.3	New
Majority		298	15.4	N/A
Unionist win (new seat)				

=== Heidelberg ===
General election 1910: Heidelberg
Party	Candidate	Votes	%	±%
Het Volk	Andries Stockenström	1,061	61.8	New
Independent	F. J. Bezuidenhout	657	38.2	New
Majority		404	23.6	N/A
Het Volk win (new seat)				

=== Jeppes ===
General election 1910: Jeppes
Party	Candidate	Votes	%	±%
Labour	Frederic Hugh Page Creswell	1,065	52.4	New
Unionist	Richard Feetham	968	47.6	New
Majority		97	4.8	N/A
Labour win (new seat)				

=== Krugersdorp ===
General election 1910: Krugersdorp
Party	Candidate	Votes	%	±%
Het Volk	Jan Willem Stuckeris Langerman	1,065	52.4	New
Unionist	Abraham Bailey	968	47.6	New
Majority		97	4.8	N/A
Het Volk win (new seat)				

=== Langlaagte ===
General election 1910: Langlaagte
Party	Candidate	Votes	%	±%
Unionist	Willie Rockey	945	56.8	New
Labour	Wilfred John Wybergh	718	43.2	New
Majority		227	13.6	N/A
Unionist win (new seat)				

=== Lichtenburg ===
General election 1910: Lichtenburg
Party	Candidate	Votes	%	±%
Het Volk	Hendrik Cornelis Wilhelmus Vermaas	Unopposed		
Het Volk win (new seat)				

=== Losberg ===
General election 1910: Losberg
Party	Candidate	Votes	%	±%
Het Volk	Theunis Frederik Jacobus Dreyer	Unopposed		
Het Volk win (new seat)				

=== Lydenburg ===
General election 1910: Lydenburg
Party	Candidate	Votes	%	±%
Het Volk	Christiaan Johannes Jacobus Joubert	Unopposed		
Het Volk win (new seat)				

=== Marico ===
General election 1910: Marico
Party	Candidate	Votes	%	±%
Het Volk	Lodewikus Arnoldus Slabbert Lemmer	844	83.1	New
Independent	J. W. Viljoen	172	16.9	New
Majority		672	66.2	N/A
Het Volk win (new seat)				

=== Middelburg ===
General election 1910: Middelburg
Party	Candidate	Votes	%	±%
Het Volk	Gert Johan Wilhelm du Toit	Unopposed		
Het Volk win (new seat)				

=== Potchefstroom ===
General election 1910: Potchefstroom
Party	Candidate	Votes	%	±%
Het Volk	Johannes Adriaan Neser	1,260	73.3	New
Unionist	R. J. E. Orpen	458	26.7	New
Majority		802	46.6	N/A
Het Volk win (new seat)				

=== Pretoria District North ===
General election 1910: Pretoria District North
Party	Candidate	Votes	%	±%
Het Volk	Thomas Major Cullinan	1,138	61.1	New
Labour	James Thompson Bain	538	28.9	New
Independent	I. Haarhoff	188	10.1	New
Majority		600	32.2	N/A
Het Volk win (new seat)				

=== Pretoria District South ===
General election 1910: Pretoria District South
Party	Candidate	Votes	%	±%
Het Volk	Christiaan Frederik Beyers	Unopposed		
Het Volk win (new seat)				

=== Pretoria East ===
General election 1910: Pretoria East
Party	Candidate	Votes	%	±%
Unionist	James Percy Fitzpatrick	1,231	52.1	New
Het Volk	Louis Botha	1,136	47.9	New
Majority		95	4.2	N/A
Unionist win (new seat)				

=== Pretoria West ===
General election 1910: Pretoria West
Party	Candidate	Votes	%	±%
Het Volk	Jan Smuts	999	51.4	New
Unionist	F. Hopley	644	33.1	New
Labour	John Reid	228	11.7	New
Independent	H. R. Abercrombie	74	3.8	New
Majority		355	18.3	N/A
Het Volk win (new seat)				

=== Roodepoort ===
General election 1910: Roodepoort
Party	Candidate	Votes	%	±%
Independent Labour	Charles Henry Haggar	815	50.8	New
Unionist	H. W. Soutter	789	49.2	New
Majority		26	1.6	N/A
Independent Labour win (new seat)				

=== Rustenburg ===
General election 1910: Rustenburg
Party	Candidate	Votes	%	±%
Het Volk	Pieter Gert Wessel Grobler	Unopposed		
Het Volk win (new seat)				

=== Soutpansberg ===
General election 1910: Soutpansberg
Party	Candidate	Votes	%	±%
Het Volk	Hendrik Mentz	Unopposed		
Het Volk win (new seat)				

=== Springs ===
General election 1910: Springs
Party	Candidate	Votes	%	±%
Labour	Walter Bayley Madeley	872	52.2	New
Unionist	Arthur Godfrey Barlow	799	47.8	New
Majority		73	4.4	N/A
Labour win (new seat)				

=== Standerton ===
General election 1910: Standerton
Party	Candidate	Votes	%	±%
Het Volk	Johannes Joachim Alberts	Unopposed		
Het Volk win (new seat)				

=== Troyeville ===
General election 1910: Troyeville
Party	Candidate	Votes	%	±%
Unionist	John William Quinn	1,172	59.9	New
Het Volk	G. A. Mulligan	785	40.1	New
Majority		387	19.8	N/A
Unionist win (new seat)				

=== Turffontein ===
General election 1910: Turffontein
Party	Candidate	Votes	%	±%
Unionist	Hugh Archibald Wyndham	1,049	53.7	New
Het Volk	Robert Hugh Henderson	905	46.3	New
Majority		144	7.4	N/A
Unionist win (new seat)				

=== Von Brandis ===
General election 1910: Von Brandis
Party	Candidate	Votes	%	±%
Unionist	Emile Nathan	1,330	64.6	New
Independent	R. W. Jackson	729	35.4	New
Majority		601	29.2	N/A
Unionist win (new seat)				

=== Vrededorp ===
General election 1910: Vrededorp
Party	Candidate	Votes	%	±%
Het Volk	Lourens Geldenhuys	1,059	58.6	New
Unionist	N. C. Herschensohn	601	33.2	New
Independent	G. A. Roth	148	8.2	New
Majority		601	25.4	N/A
Het Volk win (new seat)				

=== Wakkerstroom ===
General election 1910: Wakkerstroom
Party	Candidate	Votes	%	±%
Het Volk	Jozua Adriaan Joubert	Unopposed		
Het Volk win (new seat)				

=== Waterberg ===
General election 1910: Waterberg
Party	Candidate	Votes	%	±%
Het Volk	Richard Granville Nicholson	Unopposed		
Het Volk win (new seat)				

=== Wolmaransstad ===
General election 1910: Wolmaransstad
Party	Candidate	Votes	%	±%
Het Volk	Hendrik de Waal	Unopposed		
Het Volk win (new seat)				

=== Yeoville ===
General election 1910: Yeoville
Party	Candidate	Votes	%	±%
Unionist	Lionel Phillips	1,658	75.6	New
Het Volk	Willem van Hulsteyn	534	24.4	New
Majority		1,124	51.2	N/A
Unionist win (new seat)				

== Sources ==
- Schoeman, B.M. (1977). Parlementêre verkiesings in Suid-Afrika 1910-1976. Pretoria: Aktuele Publikasies.
- Standard Encyclopaedia of Southern Africa (1972). "House of Assembly" (vol. 5, pp. 617-636). Cape Town: Nasionale Opvoedkundige Uitgewery (Nasou).
- ZA HANSARDS Historical Debates of the South African Senate and House of Assembly
