= Frankfort (House of Assembly of South Africa constituency) =

- Former constituency for the South African House of Assembly
- Province: Orange Free State
- Electorate: 8,898 (1948)

Former constituency
- Created: 1910
- Abolished: 1953
- Number of members: 1
- Last MHA: J. L. B. Döhne (NP)
- Replaced by: Heilbron-Frankfort

Frankfort was a constituency in the Orange Free State Province of South Africa, which existed from 1910 to 1953. Named after the town of Frankfort, the seat covered a rural area in the northeast of the province. Throughout its existence it elected one member to the House of Assembly.

== Franchise notes ==
When the Union of South Africa was formed in 1910, the electoral qualifications in use in each pre-existing colony were kept in place. In the Orange River Colony, and its predecessor the Orange Free State, the vote was restricted to white men, and as such, elections in the Orange Free State Province were held on a whites-only franchise from the beginning. The franchise was also restricted by property and education qualifications until the 1933 general election, following the passage of the Women's Enfranchisement Act, 1930 and the Franchise Laws Amendment Act, 1931. From then on, the franchise was given to all white citizens aged 21 or over. Non-whites remained disenfranchised until the end of apartheid and the introduction of universal suffrage in 1994.

== History ==
Frankfort, like most of the Orange Free State, was a highly conservative seat throughout its existence and had a largely Afrikaans-speaking electorate. Its first MP, Thomas Phillip Brain, died in office in 1913, and the resulting by-election was one of the first contested by J. B. M. Hertzog's new National Party - as in the Bethlehem by-election held on the same day, the new party won the seat unopposed. It remained a relatively safe NP seat for the next twenty years, with Johannes Bernardus Wessels representing the seat through most of that time and generally winning around two-thirds of the vote - in 1924 and 1933, he was unopposed.

In 1934, Hertzog joined forces with Jan Smuts and the SAP to create the United Party, a move that was controversial with his Afrikaner base, and nineteen Nationalist MPs broke away to form the Purified National Party under D. F. Malan's leadership. Wessels stayed loyal to Hertzog, however, and on his departure from Parliament in 1935, the resulting by-election saw the UP hold the seat by a relatively safe margin. They held it again in 1938, with Frankfort MP Hermanus Nicolaas Wilhelmus Botha winning the second-highest vote percentage of any UP candidate in the province, beaten only by Colin Fraser Steyn in Bloemfontein. In 1943, however, Botha retired, and the seat was captured by Jacob Louis Bredeus Döhne of the Herenigde Nasionale Party, who held the seat until its merger with neighbouring Heilbron in 1953.

== Members ==
Election	Member	Party
1910	T. P. Brain	Orangia Unie
1914 by	N. W. Serfontein	National
1915	J. B. Wessels	National
1920	J. B. Wessels	National
1921	J. B. Wessels	National
1924	J. B. Wessels	National
1929	J. B. Wessels	National
1933	J. B. Wessels	National
1934	J. B. Wessels	United
1936 by	H. N. W. Botha	United
1938	H. N. W. Botha	United
1943	J. L. B. Döhne	HNP
1948	J. L. B. Döhne	HNP
1953	constituency abolished	

== Detailed results ==
=== Elections in the 1910s ===
General election 1910: Frankfort
Party	Candidate	Votes	%	±%
Orangia Unie	T. P. Brain	Unopposed		
Orangia Unie win (new seat)				

Frankfort by-election, 9 February 1914
Party	Candidate	Votes	%	±%
National	N. W. Serfontein	Unopposed		
National hold				

General election 1915: Frankfort
Party	Candidate	Votes	%	±%
National	J. B. Wessels	1,209	61.3	New
South African	H. N. W. Botha	763	38.7	N/A
Majority		446	22.6	N/A
Turnout		1,972	73.1	N/A
National gain from South African		Swing	N/A	

=== Elections in the 1920s ===
General election 1920: Frankfort
Party	Candidate	Votes	%	±%
National	J. B. Wessels	1,358	67.4	+6.1
South African	H. N. W. Botha	658	32.6	−6.1
Majority		700	34.8	+12.2
Turnout		2,016	68.1	−5.0
National hold		Swing	+6.1	

General election 1921: Frankfort
Party	Candidate	Votes	%	±%
National	J. B. Wessels	1,351	68.1	+0.7
South African	H. N. W. Botha	632	31.9	−0.7
Majority		719	36.2	+1.4
Turnout		1,983	63.7	−4.4
National hold		Swing	+0.7	

General election 1924: Frankfort
Party	Candidate	Votes	%	±%
National	J. B. Wessels	Unopposed		
National hold				

General election 1929: Frankfort
Party	Candidate	Votes	%	±%
National	J. B. Wessels	1,431	73.5	N/A
South African	G. P. le R. Maree	480	24.7	New
Rejected ballots		36	1.8	N/A
Majority		951	48.8	N/A
Turnout		1,947	76.8	N/A
National hold		Swing	N/A	

=== Elections in the 1930s ===
General election 1933: Frankfort
Party	Candidate	Votes	%	±%
National	J. B. Wessels	Unopposed		
National hold				

Frankfort by-election, 19 February 1936
Party	Candidate	Votes	%	±%
United	H. N. W. Botha	3,340	58.9	New
Purified National	A. J. Werth	2,289	40.3	New
Rejected ballots		46	0.8	N/A
Majority		1,051	18.5	N/A
Turnout		5,675	90.3	N/A
United gain from National		Swing	N/A	

General election 1938: Frankfort
Party	Candidate	Votes	%	±%
United	H. N. W. Botha	3,333	55.6	N/A
Purified National	J. L. Uys	2,621	43.7	New
Rejected ballots		44	0.7	N/A
Majority		712	11.9	N/A
Turnout		5,998	83.0	N/A
United hold		Swing	N/A	
