= Winburg (House of Assembly of South Africa constituency) =

- Former constituency for the South African House of Assembly
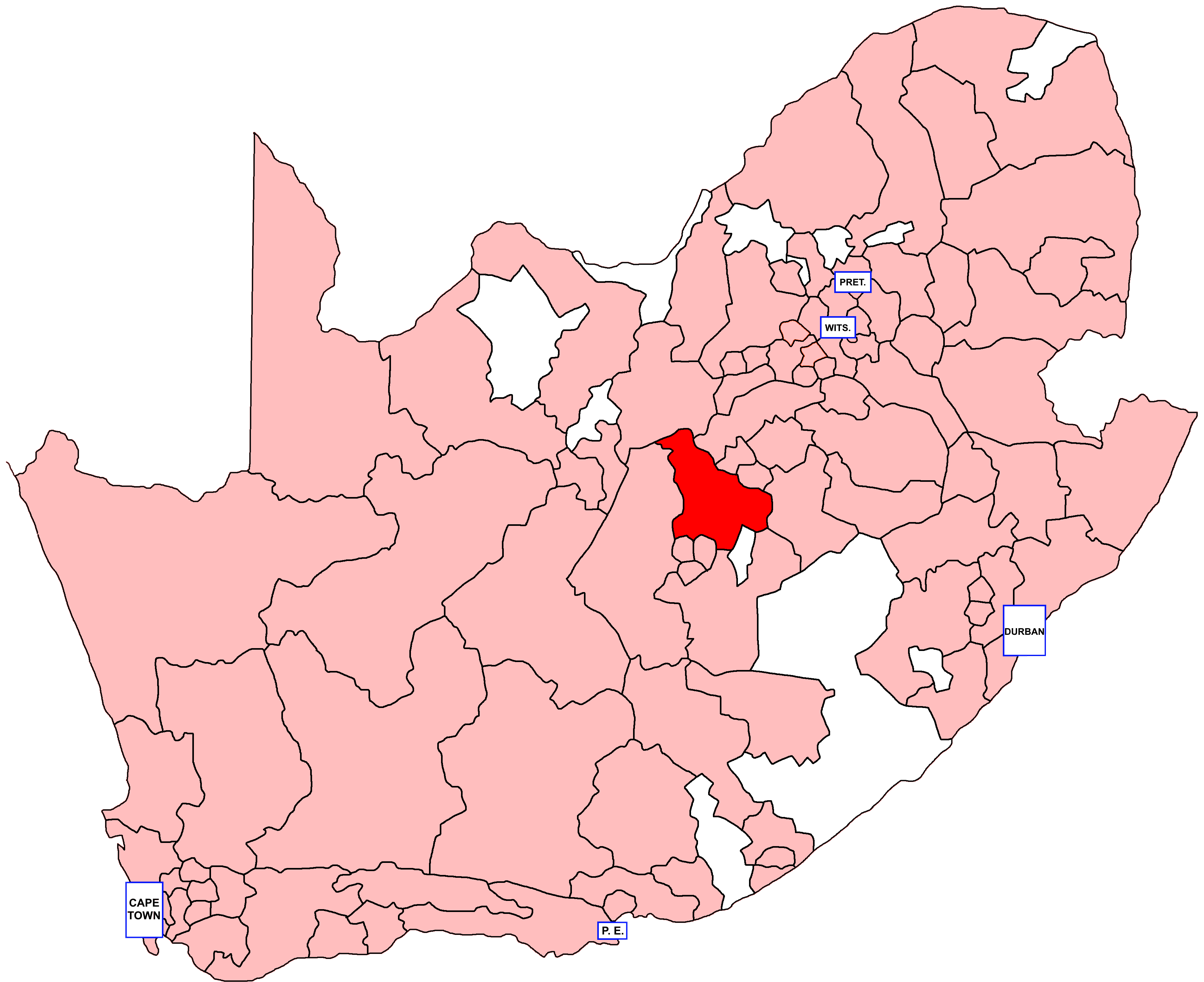
- Location of Winburg within South Africa (1981)
- Province: Orange Free State
- Electorate: 17,214 (1989)

Former constituency
- Created: 1910
- Abolished: 1994
- Number of members: 1
- Last MHA: P. T. Steyn (NP)
- Replaced by: Free State

Winburg was a constituency in the Orange Free State Province of South Africa, which existed from 1910 to 1994. Named after the town of Winburg, the seat covered a large rural area in the centre of the province. Throughout its existence it elected one member to the House of Assembly.

== Franchise notes ==
When the Union of South Africa was formed in 1910, the electoral qualifications in use in each pre-existing colony were kept in place. In the Orange River Colony, and its predecessor the Orange Free State, the vote was restricted to white men, and as such, elections in the Orange Free State Province were held on a whites-only franchise from the beginning. The franchise was also restricted by property and education qualifications until the 1933 general election, following the passage of the Women's Enfranchisement Act, 1930 and the Franchise Laws Amendment Act, 1931. From then on, the franchise was given to all white citizens aged 21 or over. Non-whites remained disenfranchised until the end of apartheid and the introduction of universal suffrage in 1994.

== History ==
Winburg, like most of the Orange Free State, was a highly conservative seat throughout its existence and had a largely Afrikaans-speaking electorate. It was an early stronghold of the National Party, and when Nationalist Prime Minister J. B. M. Hertzog joined forces with Jan Smuts to found the United Party in 1934, Winburg MP N. J. van der Merwe was one of the nineteen Nationalist MPs who broke away to form the Purified National Party under the leadership of D. F. Malan. It would continue to be represented by Nationalists throughout its existence, most notably by Charles Robberts Swart, who represented it from 1941 until his appointment as Governor-General in 1959.

== Members ==
Election	Member	Party
1910	F. R. Cronjé	Orangia Unie
1915	C. T. M. Wilcocks	National
1920	C. T. M. Wilcocks	National
1921	C. T. M. Wilcocks	National
1924	C. T. M. Wilcocks	National
1929	N. J. van der Merwe	National
1933	N. J. van der Merwe	National
1934	N. J. van der Merwe	GNP
1938	N. J. van der Merwe	GNP
1941 by	C. R. Swart	HNP
1943	C. R. Swart	HNP
1948	C. R. Swart	HNP
1953	C. R. Swart	National
1958	C. R. Swart	National
1960 by	N. C. van R. Sadie	National
1961	N. C. van R. Sadie	National
1966	N. C. van R. Sadie	National
1970	A. C. van Wyk	National
1974	A. C. van Wyk	National
1977	D. B. Scott	National
1981	D. B. Scott	National
1987	P. T. Steyn	National
1989	P. T. Steyn	National
1994	constituency abolished	

== Detailed results ==
=== Elections in the 1910s ===
General election 1910: Winburg
Party	Candidate	Votes	%	±%
Orangia Unie	F. R. Cronjé	Unopposed		
Orangia Unie win (new seat)				

General election 1915: Winburg
Party	Candidate	Votes	%	±%
National	C. T. M. Wilcocks	1,155	62.4	New
South African	F. R. Cronjé	695	37.6	N/A
Majority		460	24.8	N/A
Turnout		1,850	77.4	N/A
National gain from South African		Swing	N/A	

=== Elections in the 1920s ===
General election 1920: Winburg
Party	Candidate	Votes	%	±%
National	C. T. M. Wilcocks	1,369	68.3	+5.9
South African	G. R. Theron	636	31.7	−5.9
Majority		460	36.6	+11.8
Turnout		2,005	69.3	−8.1
National hold		Swing	+5.9	

General election 1921: Winburg
Party	Candidate	Votes	%	±%
National	C. T. M. Wilcocks	1,381	69.7	+1.4
South African	F. R. Cronjé	599	30.3	−1.4
Majority		782	39.4	+2.8
Turnout		1,980	65.7	−3.6
National hold		Swing	+1.4	

General election 1924: Winburg
Party	Candidate	Votes	%	±%
National	C. T. M. Wilcocks	1,635	74.0	+4.3
South African	F. R. Cronjé	551	24.9	−5.4
Rejected ballots		24	1.1	N/A
Majority		782	49.1	+9.7
Turnout		2,210	82.1	+16.4
National hold		Swing	+4.9	

General election 1929: Winburg
Party	Candidate	Votes	%	±%
National	N. J. van der Merwe	1,585	73.0	−1.0
South African	F. R. Cronjé	564	26.0	+1.1
Rejected ballots		21	1.0	-0.1
Majority		782	47.0	−2.1
Turnout		2,170	78.5	−3.6
National hold		Swing	-1.1	

=== Elections in the 1930s ===
General election 1933: Winburg
Party	Candidate	Votes	%	±%
National	N. J. van der Merwe	Unopposed		
National hold				

General election 1938: Winburg
Party	Candidate	Votes	%	±%
Purified National	N. J. van der Merwe	3,399	50.0	N/A
United	H. J. Edeling	3,358	49.4	New
Rejected ballots		40	0.6	N/A
Majority		41	0.6	N/A
Turnout		6,797	95.3	N/A
Purified National hold		Swing	N/A	

=== Elections in the 1940s ===
Winburg by-election, 8 January 1941
Party	Candidate	Votes	%	±%
Reunited National	C. R. Swart	3,762	61.0	+11.0
United	P. G. Theron	2,377	38.5	−10.9
Rejected ballots		31	0.5	-0.1
Majority		1,385	22.4	+21.8
Turnout		6,170	87.0	−8.3
Reunited National hold		Swing	+10.9	
