= Tembuland (House of Assembly of South Africa constituency) =

South African constituency, 1910–1948

- Temboeland
- Former constituency for the South African House of Assembly
- Province: Cape of Good Hope
- Electorate: 7,681 (1943)

Former constituency
- Created: 1910
- Abolished: 1948
- Number of members: 1
- Last MHA: A. O. B. Payn (UP)
- Replaced by: Transkeian Territories

Tembuland (Afrikaans: Temboeland) was a constituency in the Cape Province of South Africa, which existed from 1910 to 1948. It covered a rural area of the Eastern Cape between the Mthatha and Great Kei rivers, the traditional homeland of the Thembu people for whom the seat was named. Throughout its existence it elected one member to the House of Assembly and one to the Cape Provincial Council.

== Franchise notes ==
When the Union of South Africa was formed in 1910, the electoral qualifications in use in each pre-existing colony were kept in place. The Cape Colony had implemented a “colour-blind” franchise known as the Cape Qualified Franchise, which included all adult literate men owning more than £75 worth of property (controversially raised from £25 in 1892), and this initially remained in effect after the colony became the Cape Province. As of 1908, 22,784 out of 152,221 electors in the Cape Colony were “Native or Coloured”. Eligibility to serve in Parliament and the Provincial Council, however, was restricted to whites from 1910 onward.

The first challenge to the Cape Qualified Franchise came with the Women's Enfranchisement Act, 1930 and the Franchise Laws Amendment Act, 1931, which extended the vote to women and removed property qualifications for the white population only – non-white voters remained subject to the earlier restrictions. In 1936, the Representation of Natives Act removed all black voters from the common electoral roll and introduced three “Native Representative Members”, white MPs elected by the black voters of the province and meant to represent their interests in particular. A similar provision was made for Coloured voters with the Separate Representation of Voters Act, 1951, and although this law was challenged by the courts, it went into effect in time for the 1958 general election, which was thus held with all-white voter rolls for the first time in South African history. The all-white franchise would continue until the end of apartheid and the introduction of universal suffrage in 1994.

== History ==
In 1908, on the eve of Union, just over thirty percent of Tembuland’s electorate were non-white, one of the highest percentages in the Cape Colony. Along with the largely English-speaking white electorate, this made the seat a stronghold of the pro-British side of South African politics, who were more likely to support the maintenance of the Cape Qualified Franchise. The seat’s MPs all represented the main pro-British party – first the Unionists, then the South African Party, and finally the United Party, which Tembuland MP Alfred Owen Balleine Payn joined on its creation in 1934. In fact, throughout its existence, the National Party only contested Tembuland once, in 1915 – subsequent elections were either uncontested or contested only by independents. In 1948, the constituency was merged with neighbouring Griqualand East to form the new seat of Transkeian Territories, which remained a stronghold for the UP.

== Members ==
Election	Member	Party
1910	Theophilus Lyndall Schreiner	Ind. Unionist
1915	William Hemming Stuart	Unionist
1920	William Hemming Stuart	Unionist
1921	William Hemming Stuart	South African
1924	Alfred Owen Balleine Payn	South African
1929	Alfred Owen Balleine Payn	South African
1933	Alfred Owen Balleine Payn	South African
1934	Alfred Owen Balleine Payn	United
1938	Alfred Owen Balleine Payn	United
1943	Alfred Owen Balleine Payn	United
1948	constituency abolished	

== Detailed results ==
=== Elections in the 1910s ===
General election 1910: Tembuland
Party	Candidate	Votes	%	±%
Ind. Unionist	T. L. Schreiner	Unopposed		
Ind. Unionist win (new seat)				

General election 1915: Tembuland
Party	Candidate	Votes	%	±%
Unionist	W. H. Stuart	1,171	47.3	N/A
South African	C. P. Bligh-Wall	785	31.7	New
National	W. E. Warner	518	20.9	New
Majority		386	15.6	N/A
Turnout		2,474	74.5	N/A
Unionist hold		Swing	N/A	

=== Elections in the 1920s ===
General election 1920: Tembuland
Party	Candidate	Votes	%	±%
Unionist	W. H. Stuart	1,225	54.3	+7.0
South African	C. P. Bligh-Wall	1,030	45.7	+14.0
Majority		195	8.6	−7.0
Turnout		2,255	65.1	−9.4
Unionist hold		Swing	-3.5	

General election 1921: Tembuland
Party	Candidate	Votes	%	±%
South African	William Hemming Stuart	1,133	50.2	−4.1
Ind. South African	Alfred Owen Balleine Payn	1,122	49.8	New
Majority		11	0.4	N/A
Turnout		2,255	63.1	−2.0
South African hold		Swing	N/A	

General election 1924: Tembuland
Party	Candidate	Votes	%	±%
Ind. South African	A. O. B. Payn	1,373	50.8	+1.0
South African	W. H. Stuart	1,307	48.4	−1.8
Rejected ballots		22	0.8	N/A
Majority		66	2.4	N/A
Turnout		2,702	74.2	+11.1
Ind. South African gain from South African		Swing	+1.9	

General election 1929: Tembuland
Party	Candidate	Votes	%	±%
South African	A. O. B. Payn	1,079	46.2	−4.6
Ind. South African	G. K. Hemming	934	40.0	New
South African Communist Party	S. P. Bunting	289	12.4	New
Rejected ballots		34	1.4	+0.6
Majority		145	6.2	N/A
Turnout		2,336	68.9	−5.3
South African hold		Swing	N/A	

=== Elections in the 1930s ===
General election 1933: Tembuland
Party	Candidate	Votes	%	±%
South African	A. O. B. Payn	Unopposed		
South African hold				

General election 1938: Tembuland
Party	Candidate	Votes	%	±%
United	Alfred Owen Balleine Payn	Unopposed		
United hold				
