= Harrismith (House of Assembly of South Africa constituency) =

- Former constituency for the South African House of Assembly
- Province: Orange Free State
- Electorate: 9,845 (1970)

Former constituency
- Created: 1910
- Abolished: 1974
- Number of members: 1
- Last MHA: J. J. Rall (NP)

Harrismith was a constituency in the Orange Free State Province of South Africa, which existed from 1910 to 1974. Named after the town of Harrismith, the seat covered a large rural area in the east of the province, bordering Natal. Throughout its existence it elected one member to the House of Assembly.

== Franchise notes ==
When the Union of South Africa was formed in 1910, the electoral qualifications in use in each pre-existing colony were kept in place. In the Orange River Colony, and its predecessor the Orange Free State, the vote was restricted to white men, and as such, elections in the Orange Free State Province were held on a whites-only franchise from the beginning. The franchise was also restricted by property and education qualifications until the 1933 general election, following the passage of the Women's Enfranchisement Act, 1930 and the Franchise Laws Amendment Act, 1931. From then on, the franchise was given to all white citizens aged 21 or over. Non-whites remained disenfranchised until the end of apartheid and the introduction of universal suffrage in 1994.

== History ==
Harrismith, like most of the Orange Free State, was a highly conservative seat throughout its existence and had a largely Afrikaans-speaking electorate. It was held nearly throughout its existence by the National Party, whose founding leader, J. B. M. Hertzog, was enormously popular with the Free State's Afrikaner population. The only exceptions were periods where the NP didn't exist: at the inaugural Union election in 1910, at which point Hertzog was still part of the provincial Orangia Unie party, and during the 1934–38 period, after Hertzog and Jan Smuts joined forces to create the United Party. This move was controversial with Hertzog's conservative Afrikaner base, many of whom joined the Purified National Party under D. F. Malan, and when Harrismith's pro-Hertzog MP stood down at the 1938 general election, the PNP narrowly won the seat. It returned to its position as an NP safe seat immediately afterwards, and the party never again faced a serious challenge.

== Members ==
Election	Member	Party
1910	I. J. Meyer	Orangia Unie
1915	Z. J. de Beer	National
1920	Z. J. de Beer	National
1921	A. A. Cilliers	National
1924	A. A. Cilliers	National
1929	A. A. Cilliers	National
1933	A. A. Cilliers	National
1934	A. A. Cilliers	United
1938	E. R. Strauss	PNP
1943	E. R. Strauss	HNP
1948	E. R. Strauss	HNP
1949 by	S. F. Papenfus	HNP
1953	S. F. Papenfus	National
1958	S. F. Papenfus	National
1961	J. J. Rall	National
1966	J. J. Rall	National
1970	J. J. Rall	National
1974	constituency abolished	

== Detailed results ==
=== Elections in the 1910s ===
General election 1910: Harrismith
Party	Candidate	Votes	%	±%
Orangia Unie	I. J. Meyer	Unopposed		
Orangia Unie win (new seat)				

General election 1915: Harrismith
Party	Candidate	Votes	%	±%
National	Z. J. de Beer	999	54.6	New
South African	L. P. H. Botha	832	45.4	N/A
Majority		167	9.2	N/A
Turnout		1,831	77.5	N/A
National gain from South African		Swing	N/A	

=== Elections in the 1920s ===
General election 1920: Harrismith
Party	Candidate	Votes	%	±%
National	Z. J. de Beer	1,312	64.1	+9.5
South African	J. P. G. Steyl	736	35.9	−9.5
Majority		576	28.2	+19.0
Turnout		2,048	69.5	−8.0
National hold		Swing	+9.5	

General election 1921: Harrismith
Party	Candidate	Votes	%	±%
National	A. A. Cilliers	1,394	65.2	+1.1
South African	M. J. Beukes	743	34.8	−1.1
Majority		651	30.4	+2.2
Turnout		2,137	68.9	−0.6
National hold		Swing	+1.1	

General election 1924: Harrismith
Party	Candidate	Votes	%	±%
National	A. A. Cilliers	1,319	64.7	−0.5
South African	P. J. C. Maree	699	34.3	−0.5
Rejected ballots		20	1.0	N/A
Majority		620	30.4	+−0
Turnout		2,038	69.3	+0.4
National hold		Swing	+-0	

General election 1929: Harrismith
Party	Candidate	Votes	%	±%
National	A. A. Cilliers	1,413	66.7	+2.0
South African	H. N. W. Botha	677	31.9	−2.4
Rejected ballots		30	1.4	+0.4
Majority		736	34.8	+4.4
Turnout		2,120	77.7	+8.4
National hold		Swing	+2.2	

=== Elections in the 1930s ===
General election 1933: Harrismith
Party	Candidate	Votes	%	±%
National	A. A. Cilliers	2,150	66.5	−0.2
Independent	D. I. de Villiers	1,063	32.9	New
Rejected ballots		22	0.6	-0.8
Majority		1,087	33.6	N/A
Turnout		3,235	53.9	−23.8
National hold		Swing	N/A	

General election 1938: Harrismith
Party	Candidate	Votes	%	±%
Purified National	E. R. Strauss	3,376	51.6	New
United	D. J. de Jager	3,117	47.6	−18.9
Rejected ballots		52	0.8	+0.2
Majority		259	4.0	N/A
Turnout		6,545	91.6	+37.7
Purified National gain from United		Swing	N/A	
