= Weenen (House of Assembly of South Africa constituency) =

- Former constituency for the South African House of Assembly
- Province: Natal
- Electorate: 5,158 (1938)

Former constituency
- Created: 1910
- Abolished: 1943
- Number of members: 1
- Last MHA: Harold Abrahamson (UP)
- Replaced by: Drakensberg

Weenen was a constituency in the Natal Province of South Africa, which existed from 1910 to 1943. It covered a rural area in western Natal centred on its namesake town. Throughout its existence it elected one member to the House of Assembly.

== Franchise notes ==
When the Union of South Africa was formed in 1910, the electoral qualifications in use in each pre-existing colony were kept in place. The franchise used in the Natal Colony, while theoretically not restricted by race, was significantly less liberal than that of the Cape, and no more than a few hundred non-white electors ever qualified. In 1908, an estimated 200 of the 22,786 electors in the colony were of non-European descent, and by 1935, only one remained. By 1958, when the last non-white voters in the Cape were taken off the rolls, Natal too had an all-white electorate. The franchise was also restricted by property and education qualifications until the 1933 general election, following the passage of the Women's Enfranchisement Act, 1930 and the Franchise Laws Amendment Act, 1931. From then on, the franchise was given to all white citizens aged 21 or over, which remained the case until the end of apartheid and the introduction of universal suffrage in 1994.

== History ==
As in the rest of Natal, Weenen's electorate was largely English-speaking and conservative. With the exception of its first election, in which Unionist Hugh Mowbray Meyler narrowly won the new seat, it was held by the South African Party throughout its existence. Its last MP, Harold Abrahamson, followed the majority of the SAP into the United Party in 1934, and was re-elected comfortably in 1938, facing only a Greyshirt opponent. In 1943, Weenen disappeared from the electoral map and was largely replaced by the new Drakensberg constituency, in which Abrahamson sought and won re-election, representing the new seat until 1949.

== Members ==
Election	Member	Party
1910	H. M. Meyler	Unionist
1915	J. W. Moor	South African
1920	J. W. Moor	South African
1921	J. W. Moor	South African
1924	G. R. Richards	South African
1929	Harold Abrahamson	South African
1933	Harold Abrahamson	South African
1934	Harold Abrahamson	United
1938	Harold Abrahamson	United
1943	constituency abolished	

== Detailed results ==
=== Elections in the 1910s ===
General election 1910: Weenen
Party	Candidate	Votes	%	±%
Unionist	H. H. Meyler	495	52.4	New
South African	Frederick Moor	450	47.6	New
Majority		45	4.8	N/A
Unionist win (new seat)				

General election 1915: Weenen
Party	Candidate	Votes	%	±%
South African	J. W. Moor	536	51.8	+4.2
Unionist	G. R. Richards	499	48.2	−4.2
Majority		37	3.6	N/A
Turnout		1,035	66.7	N/A
South African gain from Unionist		Swing	+4.2	

=== Elections in the 1920s ===
General election 1920: Weenen
Party	Candidate	Votes	%	±%
South African	J. W. Moor	559	52.1	+0.3
Unionist	G. R. Richards	388	36.2	−12.0
Labour	A. Ratcliffe	125	11.7	New
Majority		171	15.9	+12.3
Turnout		1,072	58.4	−8.3
South African hold		Swing	+6.2	

General election 1921: Weenen
Party	Candidate	Votes	%	±%
South African	J. W. Moor	812	79.6	+27.5
National	C. G. Martins	208	20.4	New
Majority		171	59.2	N/A
Turnout		1,020	53.6	−4.8
South African hold		Swing	N/A	

General election 1924: Weenen
Party	Candidate	Votes	%	±%
South African	G. R. Richards	963	69.7	−9.9
Ind. National	W. E. St. C. Moor	399	28.9	New
Rejected ballots		20	0.8	N/A
Majority		664	40.8	N/A
Turnout		1,382	73.7	+20.1
South African hold		Swing	N/A	

General election 1929: Weenen
Party	Candidate	Votes	%	±%
South African	Harold Abrahamson	1,031	52.5	−17.2
National	J. J. Boshof	919	46.8	New
Rejected ballots		15	0.7	-0.1
Majority		112	5.7	N/A
Turnout		1,965	84.1	+10.4
South African hold		Swing	N/A	

=== Elections in the 1930s ===
General election 1933: Weenen
Party	Candidate	Votes	%	±%
South African	Harold Abrahamson	Unopposed		
South African hold				

General election 1938: Weenen
Party	Candidate	Votes	%	±%
United	Harold Abrahamson	2,949	75.0	N/A
Greyshirt	C. L. S. Cherry	950	24.1	New
Rejected ballots		35	0.9	N/A
Majority		1,999	50.8	N/A
Turnout		3,934	76.3	N/A
United hold		Swing	N/A	
