= Hopetown (House of Assembly of South Africa constituency) =

South African constituency, 1910–1994

- Former constituency for the South African House of Assembly
- Province: Cape of Good Hope
- Electorate: 6,165 (1938)

Former constituency
- Created: 1910
- Abolished: 1943
- Number of members: 1
- Last MHA: Pieter Theron (UP)
- Replaced by: Albert-Colesberg; Prieska

Hopetown was a constituency in the Cape Province of South Africa, which existed from 1910 to 1943. It covered a large rural area in the northern Karoo, centred on the town of Hopetown. Throughout its existence it elected one member to the House of Assembly and one to the Cape Provincial Council.

== Franchise notes ==
When the Union of South Africa was formed in 1910, the electoral qualifications in use in each pre-existing colony were kept in place. The Cape Colony had implemented a “colour-blind” franchise known as the Cape Qualified Franchise, which included all adult literate men owning more than £75 worth of property (controversially raised from £25 in 1892), and this initially remained in effect after the colony became the Cape Province. As of 1908, 22,784 out of 152,221 electors in the Cape Colony were “Native or Coloured”. Eligibility to serve in Parliament and the Provincial Council, however, was restricted to whites from 1910 onward.

The first challenge to the Cape Qualified Franchise came with the Women's Enfranchisement Act, 1930 and the Franchise Laws Amendment Act, 1931, which extended the vote to women and removed property qualifications for the white population only – non-white voters remained subject to the earlier restrictions. In 1936, the Representation of Natives Act removed all black voters from the common electoral roll and introduced three “Native Representative Members”, white MPs elected by the black voters of the province and meant to represent their interests in particular. A similar provision was made for Coloured voters with the Separate Representation of Voters Act, 1951, and although this law was challenged by the courts, it went into effect in time for the 1958 general election, which was thus held with all-white voter rolls for the first time in South African history. The all-white franchise would continue until the end of apartheid and the introduction of universal suffrage in 1994.

== History ==
Hopetown was a bellwether seat throughout its existence, being represented by the governing party at every election. Like much of the rural Cape, it started out dominated by the South African Party, but from 1915 the National Party grew in strength in each successive election, finally winning the seat in 1924 even as they assumed government. National MP Pieter Theron, who had been elected unopposed in 1933, joined the United Party on its formation in 1934 and was re-elected under that label in 1938. The seat was abolished at the following election, with most of its electors going to the seats of Albert-Colesberg and Prieska, and Theron retired at the same time.

== Members ==
Election	Member	Party
1910	H. L. Aucamp	SAP
1912 by	P. G. Marais	SAP
1915	P. S. Cilliers	SAP
1920	P. S. Cilliers	SAP
1921	P. S. Cilliers	SAP
1924	Albert Jacobus Stals	National
1929	Albert Jacobus Stals	National
1933	Pieter Theron	National
1934	Pieter Theron	United
1938	Pieter Theron	United
1943	constituency abolished	

== Detailed results ==
=== Elections in the 1910s ===
General election 1910: Hopetown
Party	Candidate	Votes	%	±%
South African	H. L. Aucamp	Unopposed		
South African win (new seat)				

Hopetown by-election, 16 March 1912
Party	Candidate	Votes	%	±%
South African	P. G. Marais	Unopposed		
South African hold				

General election 1915: Hopetown
Party	Candidate	Votes	%	±%
South African	P. S. Cilliers	1,474	63.7	N/A
National	N. D. Geldenhuys	840	36.3	New
Majority		634	27.4	N/A
Turnout		2,314	76.0	N/A
South African hold		Swing	N/A	

=== Elections in the 1920s ===
General election 1920: Hopetown
Party	Candidate	Votes	%	±%
South African	P. S. Cilliers	1,359	52.7	−11.0
National	H. J. Wessels	1,222	47.3	+11.0
Majority		137	5.4	−22.0
Turnout		2,581	74.8	−1.2
South African hold		Swing	-11.0	

General election 1921: Hopetown
Party	Candidate	Votes	%	±%
South African	P. S. Cilliers	1,562	54.8	+2.1
National	P. G. Marais	1,290	45.2	−2.1
Majority		272	9.6	+4.2
Turnout		2,852	77.2	+2.4
South African hold		Swing	+2.1	

General election 1924: Hopetown
Party	Candidate	Votes	%	±%
National	A. J. Stals	1,607	51.1	+5.9
South African	P. S. Cilliers	1,515	48.1	−6.7
Rejected ballots		26	0.8	N/A
Majority		92	3.0	N/A
Turnout		3,148	86.9	+9.7
National gain from South African		Swing	+6.3	

General election 1929: Hopetown
Party	Candidate	Votes	%	±%
National	A. J. Stals	1,601	54.2	+3.1
South African	C. P. Matthewson	1,323	44.8	−3.3
Rejected ballots		29	1.0	+0.2
Majority		278	9.4	+6.4
Turnout		2,953	88.1	+1.2
National hold		Swing	+3.2	

=== Elections in the 1930s ===
General election 1933: Hopetown
Party	Candidate	Votes	%	±%
National	Pieter Theron	Unopposed		
National hold				

General election 1938: Hopetown
Party	Candidate	Votes	%	±%
United	Pieter Theron	2,912	52.0	N/A
Purified National	D. H. van Zyl	2,634	47.1	New
Rejected ballots		50	0.9	N/A
Majority		278	5.0	N/A
Turnout		5,596	90.8	N/A
United hold		Swing	N/A	
