= Bethlehem (House of Assembly of South Africa constituency) =

- Former constituency for the South African House of Assembly
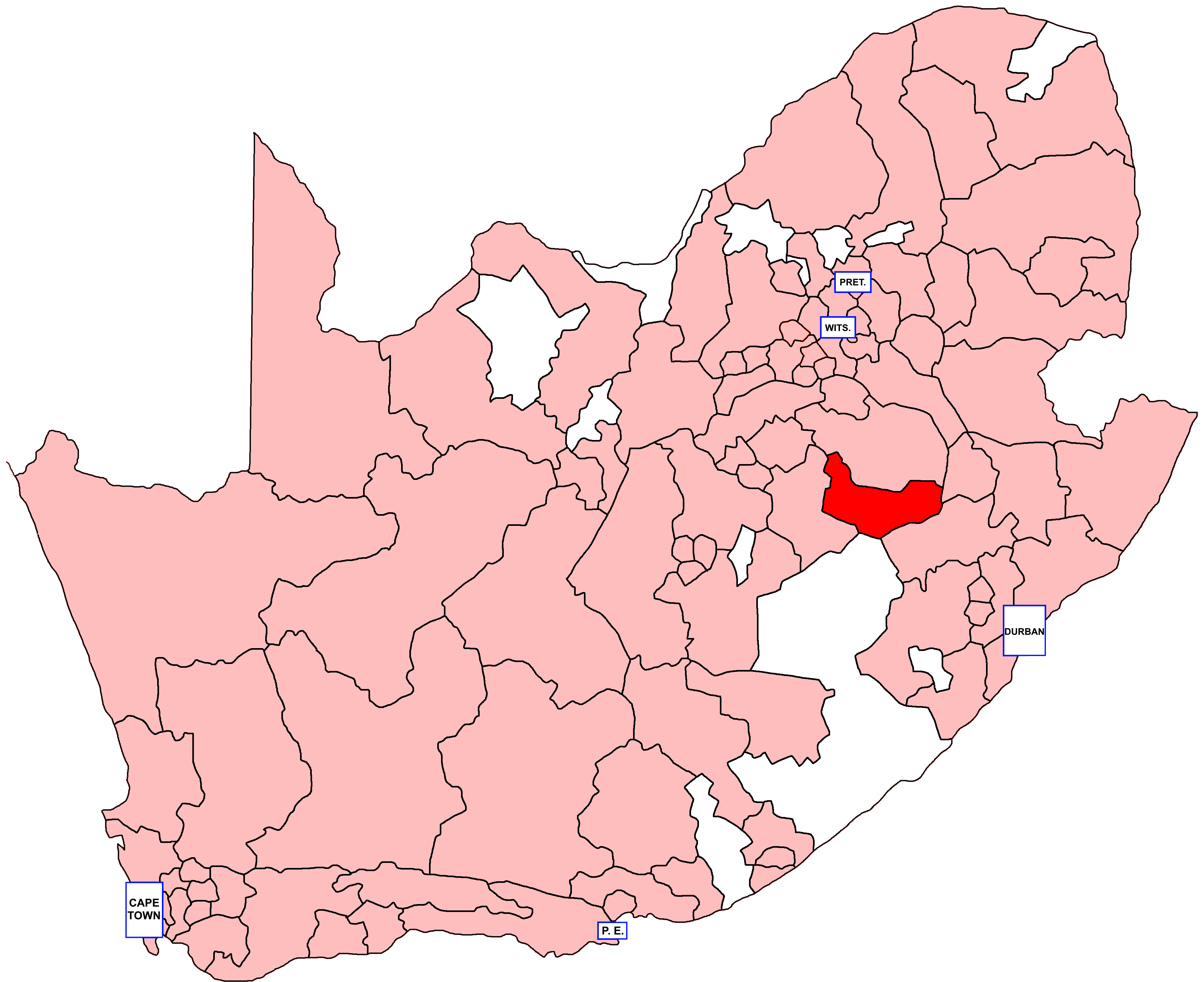
- Location of Bethlehem within South Africa (1981)
- Province: Orange Free State
- Electorate: 16,268 (1989)

Former constituency
- Created: 1910
- Abolished: 1994
- Number of members: 1
- Last MHA: P. J. Farrell (NP)
- Replaced by: Free State

Bethlehem was a constituency in the Orange Free State Province of South Africa, which existed from 1910 to 1994. Named after the town of Bethlehem, the seat covered a large rural area in the east of the province, bordering Natal as well as Lesotho. Throughout its existence it elected one member to the House of Assembly.

== Franchise notes ==
When the Union of South Africa was formed in 1910, the electoral qualifications in use in each pre-existing colony were kept in place. In the Orange River Colony, and its predecessor the Orange Free State, the vote was restricted to white men, and as such, elections in the Orange Free State Province were held on a whites-only franchise from the beginning. The franchise was also restricted by property and education qualifications until the 1933 general election, following the passage of the Women's Enfranchisement Act, 1930 and the Franchise Laws Amendment Act, 1931. From then on, the franchise was given to all white citizens aged 21 or over. Non-whites remained disenfranchised until the end of apartheid and the introduction of universal suffrage in 1994.

== History ==
Bethlehem, like most of the Orange Free State, was a highly conservative seat throughout its existence and had a largely Afrikaans-speaking electorate. Its first MP, Abraham Fischer, was the leader of the provincial Orangia Unie party (which later became the Free State branch of the South African Party) and had served as Prime Minister of the Orange River Colony prior to unification. Fischer won the seat unopposed, as did a number of his party colleagues, but he died in 1913, at which point the tensions between Louis Botha and J. B. M. Hertzog had led to Hertzog breaking away to form the National Party. Hertzog was extremely popular in the Free State, and his party quickly took over the Orangia Unie's dominant position. The by-election caused by Fischer's death was won unopposed by the new party, giving Bethlehem the distinction of being the first constituency to elect a Nationalist MP under that label, and the party would hold the seat throughout the remainder of its existence.

In 1934, Hertzog joined forces with Jan Smuts and the SAP to create the United Party, a move that was controversial with his Afrikaner base, and nineteen Nationalist MPs broke away to form the Purified National Party under D. F. Malan's leadership. One of the nineteen was Roelof Abraham Theodorus van der Merwe, MP for Bethlehem, and he held the seat against a UP challenger in one of very few close elections in the seat's history. It was only in the 1980s that the seat began to see serious contests again, as first the Herstigte Nasionale Party and then the Conservative Party began to challenge the NP from the right. Unlike several other Free State seats, however, Bethlehem continued to elect Nationalist MPs right up until the end of apartheid.

== Members ==
Election	Member	Party
1910	Abraham Fischer	Orangia Unie
1914 by	J. H. B. Wessels	National
1915	J. H. B. Wessels	National
1920	J. H. B. Wessels	National
1921	J. H. B. Wessels	National
1924	J. H. B. Wessels	National
1927 by	D. G. Conradie	National
1929	R. A. T. van der Merwe	National
1933	R. A. T. van der Merwe	National
1934	R. A. T. van der Merwe	PNP
1938	R. A. T. van der Merwe	PNP
1939	R. A. T. van der Merwe	HNP
1943	C. J. O. Wessels	HNP
1948	A. J. R. van Rhyn	HNP
1952 by	G. J. Knobel	National
1953	G. J. Knobel	National
1958	G. J. Knobel	National
1961	G. J. Knobel	National
1966	G. J. Knobel	National
1968 by	L. J. Botha	National
1970	L. J. Botha	National
1974	L. J. Botha	National
1977	L. J. Botha	National
1981	C. V. van der Merwe	National
1985 by	P. J. Farrell	National
1987	P. J. Farrell	National
1989	P. J. Farrell	National
1994	constituency abolished	

== Detailed results ==
=== Elections in the 1910s ===
General election 1910: Bethlehem
Party	Candidate	Votes	%	±%
Orangia Unie	Abraham Fischer	Unopposed		
Orangia Unie win (new seat)				

Bethlehem by-election, 9 February 1914
Party	Candidate	Votes	%	±%
National	J. H. B. Wessels	Unopposed		
National hold				

General election 1915: Bethlehem
Party	Candidate	Votes	%	±%
National	J. H. B. Wessels	1,307	66.6	New
South African	J. J. Booysen	655	33.4	N/A
Majority		652	33.2	N/A
Turnout		1,962	72.9	N/A
National gain from South African		Swing	N/A	

=== Elections in the 1920s ===
General election 1920: Bethlehem
Party	Candidate	Votes	%	±%
National	J. H. B. Wessels	1,430	68.3	+1.7
South African	O. A. I. Davel	665	31.7	−1.7
Majority		765	36.6	+3.4
Turnout		2,095	70.6	−1.3
National hold		Swing	+1.7	

General election 1921: Bethlehem
Party	Candidate	Votes	%	±%
National	J. H. B. Wessels	1,467	70.1	+1.8
South African	E. C. D. Roos	625	29.9	−1.8
Majority		842	40.2	+3.6
Turnout		2,092	66.6	−4.0
National hold		Swing	+1.8	

General election 1924: Bethlehem
Party	Candidate	Votes	%	±%
National	J. H. B. Wessels	1,511	73.8	+3.7
South African	E. M. Ellenberger	507	24.8	−5.1
Rejected ballots		30	1.4	N/A
Majority		1,004	49.0	+8.8
Turnout		2,048	72.1	+5.5
National hold		Swing	+4.4	

Bethlehem by-election, 19 January 1927
Party	Candidate	Votes	%	±%
National	D. G. Conradie	1,311	69.4	−4.4
South African	O. A. I. Davel	529	28.0	+3.2
Independent	J. C. Buys	19	1.0	New
Rejected ballots		29	1.6	+0.2
Majority		782	41.4	−7.6
Turnout		1,888	65.4	−6.7
National hold		Swing	-3.8	

General election 1929: Bethlehem
Party	Candidate	Votes	%	±%
National	R. A. T. van der Merwe	1,469	77.0	+3.2
South African	P. J. Botha	419	22.0	−2.8
Rejected ballots		21	1.0	-0.4
Majority		1,050	55.0	+6.0
Turnout		1,909	71.8	−0.3
National hold		Swing	+3.0	

=== Elections in the 1930s ===
General election 1933: Bethlehem
Party	Candidate	Votes	%	±%
National	R. A. T. van der Merwe	Unopposed		
National hold				

General election 1938: Bethlehem
Party	Candidate	Votes	%	±%
Purified National	R. A. T. van der Merwe	3,305	51.2	N/A
United	F. T. Edeling	3,082	47.8	New
Rejected ballots		65	1.0	N/A
Majority		223	3.5	N/A
Turnout		6,452	90.7	N/A
Purified National hold		Swing	N/A	
