= Heilbron (House of Assembly of South Africa constituency) =

Former constituency in the Orange Free State of South Africa

- Former constituency for the South African House of Assembly
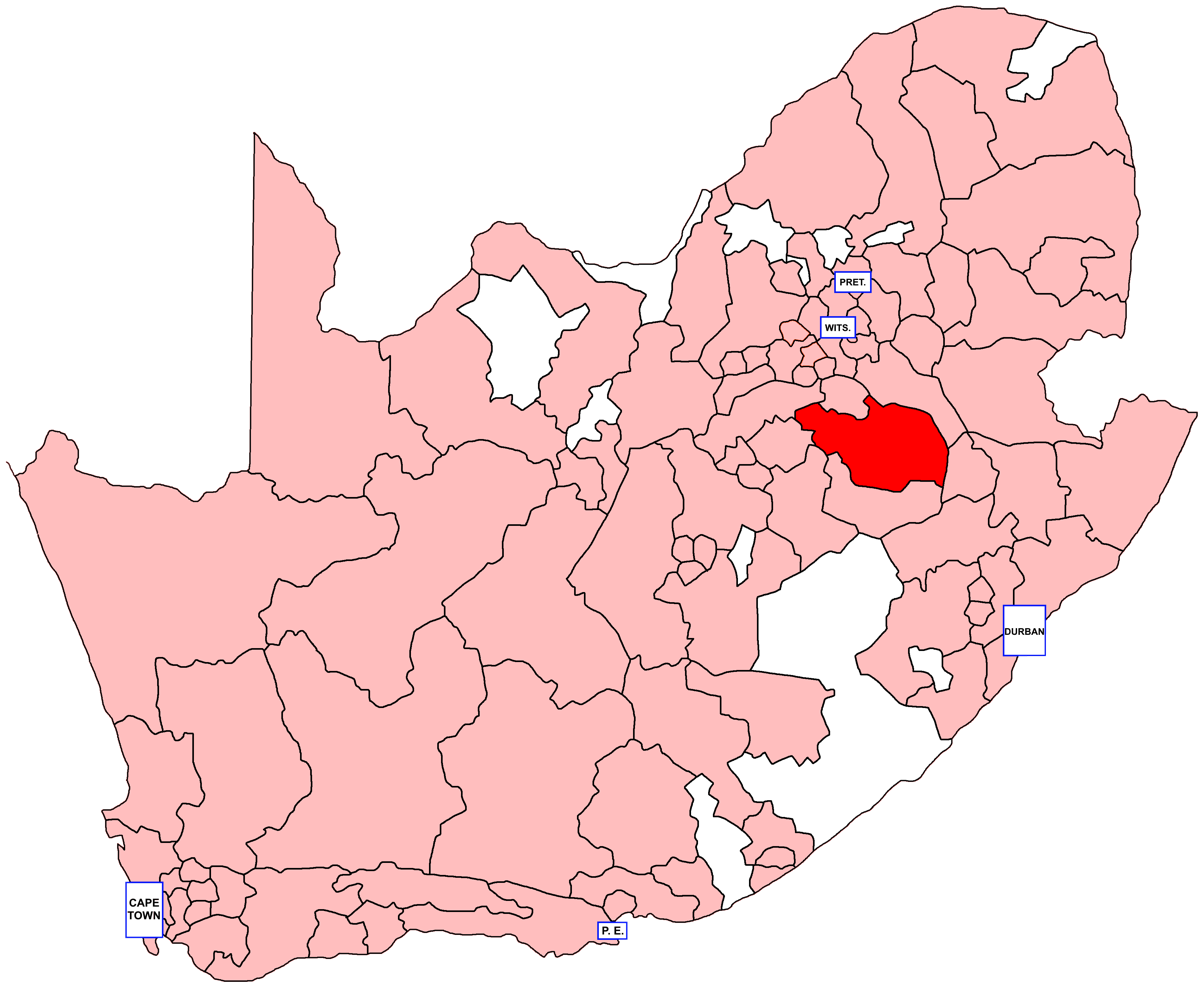
- Location of Heilbron within South Africa (1981)
- Province: Orange Free State
- Electorate: 10,597 (1989)

Former constituency
- Created: 1910
- Abolished: 1994
- Number of members: 1
- Last MHA: C. H. Pienaar (CP)
- Replaced by: Free State

Heilbron, known as Heilbron-Frankfort for the 1953 general election, was a constituency in the Orange Free State Province of South Africa, which existed from 1910 to 1994. Named after the town of Heilbron, the seat covered a large rural area in the east of the province, bordering the Transvaal. Throughout its existence it elected one member to the House of Assembly.

== Franchise notes ==
When the Union of South Africa was formed in 1910, the electoral qualifications in use in each pre-existing colony were kept in place. In the Orange River Colony, and its predecessor the Orange Free State, the vote was restricted to white men, and as such, elections in the Orange Free State Province were held on a whites-only franchise from the beginning. The franchise was also restricted by property and education qualifications until the 1933 general election, following the passage of the Women's Enfranchisement Act, 1930 and the Franchise Laws Amendment Act, 1931. From then on, the franchise was given to all white citizens aged 21 or over. Non-whites remained disenfranchised until the end of apartheid and the introduction of universal suffrage in 1994.

== History ==
Heilbron, like most of the Orange Free State, was a highly conservative seat throughout its existence and had a largely Afrikaans-speaking electorate. It was an early stronghold for the National Party, whose founding leader J. B. M. Hertzog enjoyed widespread popularity with the Free State's Afrikaner population. Its long-serving Nationalist MP, Marthinus Lourens Malan, left parliament in June 1934, as Hertzog was in the process of merging his party with Jan Smuts' South African Party to form the new United Party. The resulting by-election was the last contested by the SAP and National Party as separate entities, and unlike every previous contest in the seat, the SAP won by a comfortable margin. Their MP, Johan Louis Venter Liebenberg, would represent three separate parties over a fairly short parliamentary career: he joined the UP on its formation shortly after he was elected, narrowly held the seat in 1938, then joined Nicolaas Havenga's Afrikaner Party in 1940. He contested the seat under that label in 1943, but like most Afrikaner Party candidates, placed a distant third, and the seat was taken by Pieter Willem Adriaan Pieterse for the Herenigde Nasionale Party, which swept the Free State in that election.

Heilbron would continue to be an NP safe seat until the 1980s, when the governing party began to face serious opposition from the right in a number of rural seats. The new Conservative Party came close to winning Heilbron at its first election in 1987, and it was one of a number of seats that fell to the party in 1989. Heilbron's last MP, Cehill Hercules Pienaar, eventually defected to the Inkatha Freedom Party and became a delegate to the first National Council of Provinces for that party.

== Members ==
Election	Member	Party
1910	P. J. G. Theron	Orangia Unie
1915	M. L. Malan	National
1920	M. L. Malan	National
1921	M. L. Malan	National
1924	M. L. Malan	National
1929	M. L. Malan	National
1933	M. L. Malan	National
1934 by	J. L. V. Liebenberg	South African
1934	J. L. V. Liebenberg	United
1938	J. L. V. Liebenberg	United
1940	J. L. V. Liebenberg	Afrikaner
1943	P. W. A. Pieterse	HNP
1948	P. W. A. Pieterse	HNP
1953	G. F. van L. Froneman	National
1958	G. F. van L. Froneman	National
1961	G. F. van L. Froneman	National
1966	G. F. van L. Froneman	National
1970	G. F. C. du Plessis	National
1974	G. F. C. du Plessis	National
1977	J. J. M. J. van Vuuren	National
1981	A. J. W. P. S. Terblanche	National
1987	A. J. W. P. S. Terblanche	National
1989	C. H. Pienaar	Conservative
1994	constituency abolished	

== Detailed results ==
=== Elections in the 1910s ===
General election 1910: Heilbron
Party	Candidate	Votes	%	±%
Orangia Unie	P. J. G. Theron	788	71.6	New
Independent	J. Pierce	312	28.4	New
Majority		476	43.2	N/A
Orangia Unie win (new seat)				

General election 1915: Heilbron
Party	Candidate	Votes	%	±%
National	M. L. Malan	1,129	63.1	New
South African	Deneys Reitz	659	36.9	−34.7
Majority		570	26.2	N/A
Turnout		1,788	76.4	N/A
National gain from South African		Swing	N/A	

=== Elections in the 1920s ===
General election 1920: Heilbron
Party	Candidate	Votes	%	±%
National	M. L. Malan	1,458	69.9	+6.8
South African	L. J. Naudé	628	30.1	−6.8
Majority		830	39.8	+13.6
Turnout		2,086	69.7	−6.7
National hold		Swing	+6.8	

General election 1921: Heilbron
Party	Candidate	Votes	%	±%
National	M. L. Malan	1,503	72.4	+2.5
South African	L. J. Naudé	572	27.6	−2.5
Majority		931	44.8	+5.0
Turnout		2,075	65.1	−4.6
National hold		Swing	+2.5	

General election 1924: Heilbron
Party	Candidate	Votes	%	±%
National	M. L. Malan	1,497	74.9	+2.5
South African	C. D. Naudé	470	23.5	−3.9
Rejected ballots		32	1.4	N/A
Majority		1,027	51.4	+6.6
Turnout		1,999	77.6	+12.5
National hold		Swing	+3.3	

General election 1929: Heilbron
Party	Candidate	Votes	%	±%
National	M. L. Malan	1,503	77.0	+2.1
South African	C. J. Roos	419	21.5	−2.0
Rejected ballots		31	1.3	-0.1
Majority		1,084	55.5	+4.1
Turnout		1,953	77.9	+0.3
National hold		Swing	+2.1	

=== Elections in the 1930s ===
General election 1933: Heilbron
Party	Candidate	Votes	%	±%
National	M. L. Malan	Unopposed		
National hold				

Heilbron by-election, 26 September 1934
Party	Candidate	Votes	%	±%
South African	J. L. V. Liebenberg	2,550	53.9	New
National	J. J. Serfontein	1,550	32.7	N/A
Roos	C. A. Smit	380	8.0	New
Labour	J. P. D. Burger	139	2.9	New
Rejected ballots		114	2.5	N/A
Majority		1,000	21.1	N/A
Turnout		4,733	78.1	N/A
South African gain from National		Swing	N/A	

General election 1938: Heilbron
Party	Candidate	Votes	%	±%
United	J. L. V. Liebenberg	3,416	51.2	N/A
Purified National	J. G. F. van der Merwe	3,183	47.7	New
Rejected ballots		73	1.1	N/A
Majority		233	3.5	N/A
Turnout		6,672	93.6	N/A
United hold		Swing	N/A	
