= Three Rivers (House of Assembly of South Africa constituency) =

South African constituency, 1910–1929

- Drie Riviere
- Former constituency for the South African House of Assembly
- Province: Cape of Good Hope
- Electorate: 6,045 (1928 by)

Former constituency
- Created: 1910
- Abolished: 1929
- Number of members: 1
- Last MHA: Frank Gibaud (SAP)

Three Rivers (Afrikaans: Drie Riviere) was a constituency in the Cape Province of South Africa, which existed from 1910 to 1929. It covered the Algoa Bay coast north of Port Elizabeth (now Gqeberha), including the mouths of the Swartkops, Coega and Sundays rivers (hence the name of the seat). Throughout its existence it elected one member to the House of Assembly and one to the Cape Provincial Council.

== Franchise notes ==
When the Union of South Africa was formed in 1910, the electoral qualifications in use in each pre-existing colony were kept in place. The Cape Colony had implemented a “colour-blind” franchise known as the Cape Qualified Franchise, which included all adult literate men owning more than £75 worth of property (controversially raised from £25 in 1892), and this initially remained in effect after the colony became the Cape Province. As of 1908, 22,784 out of 152,221 electors in the Cape Colony were “Native or Coloured”. Eligibility to serve in Parliament and the Provincial Council, however, was restricted to whites from 1910 onward.

The first challenge to the Cape Qualified Franchise came with the Women's Enfranchisement Act, 1930 and the Franchise Laws Amendment Act, 1931, which extended the vote to women and removed property qualifications for the white population only – non-white voters remained subject to the earlier restrictions. In 1936, the Representation of Natives Act removed all black voters from the common electoral roll and introduced three “Native Representative Members”, white MPs elected by the black voters of the province and meant to represent their interests in particular. A similar provision was made for Coloured voters with the Separate Representation of Voters Act, 1951, and although this law was challenged by the courts, it went into effect in time for the 1958 general election, which was thus held with all-white voter rolls for the first time in South African history. The all-white franchise would continue until the end of apartheid and the introduction of universal suffrage in 1994.

== History ==
Like the rest of the Eastern Cape, Three Rivers had a largely English-speaking electorate and was a stronghold of the pro-British side of South African politics. For nearly the entire existence of the seat, it was represented by one MP: Daniel Maclaren Brown, who was first elected as a Unionist but joined the South African Party after the Unionist Party merged with them. Brown left office in November 1927, and the ensuing by-election was won by his party colleague Frank Gibaud, who would represent the seat until its abolition just over a year later.

== Members ==
| Election | Member | Party |
|---|---|---|
| 1910 | D. M. Brown | Unionist |
| 1915 | D. M. Brown | Unionist |
| 1920 | D. M. Brown | Unionist |
| 1921 | D. M. Brown | South African |
| 1924 | D. M. Brown | South African |
| 1928 by | Frank Gibaud | South African |
| 1929 | constituency abolished | |

== Detailed results ==
=== Elections in the 1910s ===
General election 1910: Three Rivers
| Party | Candidate | Votes | % | ±% |
|---|---|---|---|---|
| Unionist | D. M. Brown | Unopposed | | |
| Unionist win (new seat) | | | | |

General election 1915: Three Rivers
| Party | Candidate | Votes | % | ±% |
|---|---|---|---|---|
| Unionist | D. M. Brown | 1,171 | 41.0 | N/A |
| South African | J. Wynne | 868 | 30.4 | New |
| National | A. H. du Preez | 815 | 28.6 | New |
| Majority | | 303 | 10.6 | N/A |
| Turnout | | 2,854 | 80.0 | N/A |
| Unionist hold | | Swing | N/A | |

=== Elections in the 1920s ===
General election 1920: Three Rivers
| Party | Candidate | Votes | % | ±% |
|---|---|---|---|---|
| Unionist | D. M. Brown | 1,305 | 60.6 | +19.6 |
| South African | W. T. Fowler | 734 | 34.1 | +3.7 |
| Independent | J. H. van der Wyver | 114 | 5.3 | New |
| Majority | | 571 | 26.5 | +15.9 |
| Turnout | | 2,153 | 55.6 | −24.4 |
| Unionist hold | | Swing | +7.9 | |

General election 1921: Three Rivers
| Party | Candidate | Votes | % | ±% |
|---|---|---|---|---|
| South African | D. M. Brown | 1,576 | 67.3 | +6.7 |
| National | K. Bremer | 532 | 22.7 | New |
| Labour | W. T. Fowler | 234 | 10.0 | New |
| Majority | | 571 | 44.6 | N/A |
| Turnout | | 2,342 | 59.6 | +4.0 |
| South African hold | | Swing | N/A | |

General election 1924: Three Rivers
| Party | Candidate | Votes | % | ±% |
|---|---|---|---|---|
| South African | D. M. Brown | 1,787 | 63.8 | −3.5 |
| National | C. Krog-Scheepers | 940 | 33.5 | +10.8 |
| Rejected ballots | | 76 | 2.7 | N/A |
| Majority | | 847 | 30.3 | −14.3 |
| Turnout | | 2,803 | 78.5 | +18.9 |
| South African hold | | Swing | -7.2 | |

Three Rivers by-election, 25 February 1928
| Party | Candidate | Votes | % | ±% |
|---|---|---|---|---|
| South African | Frank Gibaud | 3,141 | 64.7 | +0.9 |
| National | J. Stewart | 1,403 | 28.9 | −4.6 |
| Rejected ballots | | 312 | 6.4 | +3.7 |
| Majority | | 1,738 | 35.8 | +5.5 |
| Turnout | | 4,856 | 80.3 | +1.8 |
| South African hold | | Swing | +2.8 | |
