= Jansenville (House of Assembly of South Africa constituency) =

- Former constituency for the South African House of Assembly
- Province: Cape of Good Hope

Former constituency
- Created: 1910
- Abolished: 1915
- Number of members: 1
- Last MHA: O. A. Oosthuizen (SAP)

Jansenville was a short-lived constituency in the Cape Province of South Africa, which existed only for the inaugural Union election in 1910. It covered a rural area centred on the town of Jansenville. It elected one member to the House of Assembly and one to the Cape Provincial Council.

== Franchise notes ==
When the Union of South Africa was formed in 1910, the electoral qualifications in use in each pre-existing colony were kept in place. The Cape Colony had implemented a “colour-blind” franchise known as the Cape Qualified Franchise, which included all adult literate men owning more than £75 worth of property (controversially raised from £25 in 1892), and this initially remained in effect after the colony became the Cape Province. As of 1908, 22,784 out of 152,221 electors in the Cape Colony were “Native or Coloured”. Eligibility to serve in Parliament and the Provincial Council, however, was restricted to whites from 1910 onward.

The first challenge to the Cape Qualified Franchise came with the Women's Enfranchisement Act, 1930 and the Franchise Laws Amendment Act, 1931, which extended the vote to women and removed property qualifications for the white population only – non-white voters remained subject to the earlier restrictions. In 1936, the Representation of Natives Act removed all black voters from the common electoral roll and introduced three “Native Representative Members”, white MPs elected by the black voters of the province and meant to represent their interests in particular. A similar provision was made for Coloured voters with the Separate Representation of Voters Act, 1951, and although this law was challenged by the courts, it went into effect in time for the 1958 general election, which was thus held with all-white voter rolls for the first time in South African history. The all-white franchise would continue until the end of apartheid and the introduction of universal suffrage in 1994.

== History ==
Like many constituencies in the rural Cape, Jansenville's electorate was largely conservative and Afrikaans-speaking. Its sole MP was Ockert Almero Oosthuizen of the South African Party, who was elected unopposed at the 1910 election, meaning that Jansenville never saw a contested election for its entire existence. On the abolition of the seat in 1915, Oosthuizen moved to the neighbouring constituency of Beaufort West.

== Members ==
Election	Member	Party
1910	O. A. Oosthuizen	SAP
1915	constituency abolished	

== Detailed results ==
=== Elections in the 1910s ===
General election 1910: Jansenville
Party	Candidate	Votes	%	±%
South African	O. A. Oosthuizen	Unopposed		
South African win (new seat)				
