= Smithfield (House of Assembly of South Africa constituency) =

- Former constituency for the South African House of Assembly
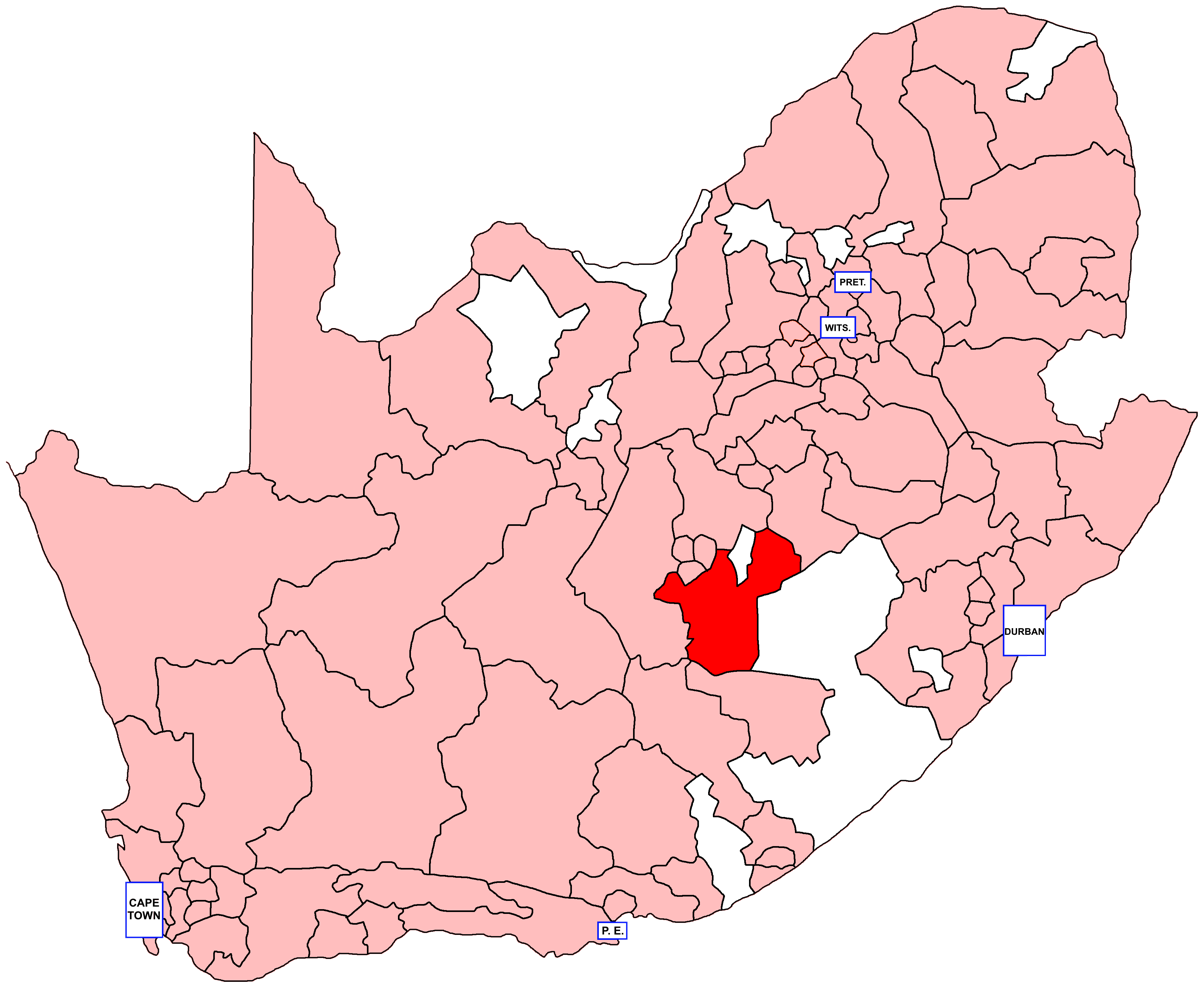
- Location of Smithfield within South Africa (1981)
- Province: Orange Free State
- Electorate: 13,130 (1989)

Former constituency
- Created: 1910
- Abolished: 1994
- Number of members: 1
- Last MHA: A.P. Oosthuizen (CP)
- Replaced by: Free State

Smithfield (known between 1929 and 1938 as Smithfield-Rouxville) was a constituency in the Orange Free State Province of South Africa, which existed from 1910 to 1994. Named after the town of Smithfield, the seat covered a large rural area in the south of the province, bordering the Cape Province as well as Lesotho. Throughout its existence it elected one member to the House of Assembly.

== Franchise notes ==
When the Union of South Africa was formed in 1910, the electoral qualifications in use in each pre-existing colony were kept in place. In the Orange River Colony, and its predecessor the Orange Free State, the vote was restricted to white men, and as such, elections in the Orange Free State Province were held on a whites-only franchise from the beginning. The franchise was also restricted by property and education qualifications until the 1933 general election, following the passage of the Women's Enfranchisement Act, 1930 and the Franchise Laws Amendment Act, 1931. From then on, the franchise was given to all white citizens aged 21 or over. Non-whites remained disenfranchised until the end of apartheid and the introduction of universal suffrage in 1994.

== History ==
Smithfield, like most of the Orange Free State, was a highly conservative seat throughout its existence and had a largely Afrikaans-speaking electorate. Its most notable MP was J. B. M. Hertzog, who represented the seat from 1910 until his retirement from politics in 1939. Hertzog's National Party, who became South Africa's governing party in 1948 and stayed in power until 1994, held Smithfield until its fall (along with several other rural Free State seats) to the Conservative Party in the 1989 general election, the last held under apartheid.

== Members ==
Election	Member	Party
1910	J. B. M. Hertzog	Orangia Unie
1915	J. B. M. Hertzog	National
1920	J. B. M. Hertzog	National
1921	J. B. M. Hertzog	National
1924	J. B. M. Hertzog	National
1929	J. B. M. Hertzog	National
1933	J. B. M. Hertzog	National
1934	J. B. M. Hertzog	United
1938	J. B. M. Hertzog	United
1939	J. B. M. Hertzog	HNP
1941 by	Jim Fouché	HNP
1943	Jim Fouché	HNP
1948	Jim Fouché	HNP
1950 by	J. J. Fouché Jr.	National
1953	J. J. Fouché Jr.	National
1958	J. J. Fouché Jr.	National
1961	J. J. Fouché Jr.	National
1966	J. S. Pansegrouw	National
1970	J. S. Pansegrouw	National
1974	J. S. Pansegrouw	National
1975 by	C. H. W. Simkin	National
1977	C. H. W. Simkin	National
1981	C. H. W. Simkin	National
1987	H. J. Smith	National
1989	A. P. Oosthuizen	Conservative
1994	constituency abolished	

== Detailed results ==
=== Elections in the 1910s ===
General election 1910: Smithfield
Party	Candidate	Votes	%	±%
Orangia Unie	J. B. M. Hertzog	Unopposed		
Orangia Unie win (new seat)				

General election 1915: Smithfield
Party	Candidate	Votes	%	±%
National	J. B. M. Hertzog	1,315	82.8	N/A
South African	G. C. Botha	272	17.2	New
Majority		1,043	65.6	N/A
Turnout		1,587	74.9	N/A
National hold		Swing	N/A	

=== Elections in the 1920s ===
General election 1920: Smithfield
Party	Candidate	Votes	%	±%
National	J. B. M. Hertzog	1,613	89.1	+6.3
South African	J. L. Botha	198	10.9	−6.3
Majority		1,415	78.2	+12.6
Turnout		1,811	69.1	−5.8
National hold		Swing	+6.3	

General election 1921: Smithfield
Party	Candidate	Votes	%	±%
National	J. B. M. Hertzog	Unopposed		
National hold				

General election 1924: Smithfield
Party	Candidate	Votes	%	±%
National	J. B. M. Hertzog	1,701	81.7	N/A
South African	G. L. Steytler	347	16.7	New
Rejected ballots		34	1.6	N/A
Majority		1,354	65.0	N/A
Turnout		2,082	76.7	N/A
National hold		Swing	N/A	

General election 1929: Smithfield-Rouxville
Party	Candidate	Votes	%	±%
National	J. B. M. Hertzog	1,560	84.1	+2.4
South African	J. A. Oberholzer	259	14.0	−2.7
Rejected ballots		37	1.9	+0.3
Majority		1,301	70.1	+5.1
Turnout		1,856	75.4	−1.3
National hold		Swing	+2.6	

=== Elections in the 1930s ===
General election 1933: Smithfield-Rouxville
Party	Candidate	Votes	%	±%
National	J. B. M. Hertzog	Unopposed		
National hold				

General election 1938: Smithfield
Party	Candidate	Votes	%	±%
United	J. B. M. Hertzog	3,566	53.5	N/A
Purified National	Jim Fouché	3,040	45.6	New
Rejected ballots		63	0.9	N/A
Majority		526	7.9	N/A
Turnout		6,669	94.2	N/A
United hold		Swing	N/A	

=== Elections in the 1940s ===
Smithfield by-election, 19 March 1941
Party	Candidate	Votes	%	±%
Reunited National	Jim Fouché	3,433	56.1	+10.5
Afrikaner	J. G. Pansegrouw	2,636	43.1	New
Rejected ballots		45	0.8	-0.1
Majority		797	13.0	N/A
Turnout		6,114	89.1	−5.1
Reunited National hold		Swing	N/A	
