= Unionist Party (South Africa) =

Unionist Party Unionisteparty
- Leader (s): Leander Jameson, Thomas Smartt, Lionel Phillips
- Founded: 31 May 1910
- Dissolved: 1920
- Preceded by: Progressive Party
- Merged into: South African Party
- Headquarters: Cape Town
- Ideology: Liberalism; Protectionism; Anti-immigration; Pro-Commonwealth
- Political position: Centre-right
- International affiliation: None
- Colours: Green

The Unionist Party (Afrikaans: Unionisteparty, UP) was a pre-apartheid South African political party, which contested elections to the Union of South Africa parliament from the 1910 South African general election until its merger into the South African Party just before the 1921 South African general election.

== History ==
In May 1910, the Progressive Party of the Cape Colony merged with the Constitutional Party of the Orange Free State (known as the Orange River Colony from 1902 to 1910) and the Progressives of Transvaal to form the Unionist Party of South Africa. Natal had no political parties, before the Union, but some politicians from that province joined the new party. The party was a pro-British conservative party. It favoured the maintenance of a pro-British political culture in South Africa similar to that present in the other British dominions.

It was for the protection of South African industries, particular the mining interests, from foreign competition that would force more unwanted non-white immigration to South Africa, mainly from India. The party's interests were closely tied to those of the Anglo-South African middle class and the mining corporations in the diamond and gold mines of South Africa. It also enthusiastically supported continued ties with the British Empire, and many of its founding members were those who had championed the British cause in the Second Boer War.

The Unionists, as the largest party in the House of Assembly not included in the government, formed the official opposition in the first two South African parliaments (1910–1920). However, after the formation of the National Party in 1914 and the subsequent outbreak of the First World War, the governing South African Party (SAP) lost its overall parliamentary majority in the 1915 South African general election. The Unionists gave some support to the South African Party government, so it could continue in office as a minority government.

In the 1920 general election both the South African Party and the Unionist Party lost seats. The Unionists, as the third largest group in the new House of Assembly, ceased to be the official opposition. In an article in The Times edition of 5 November 1920 it was explained that "when the Third Parliament of the Union met in April last General Smuts found his party in a minority – 41 (and three Independents) in a House of 134. He decided to carry on, trusting to the support of the Unionists ..."

Faced with growing nationalism among the enfranchised whites and coloureds of South Africa, the Unionist Party's base dwindled. The party was forced into first an alliance and then fusion with the South African Party, in a futile attempt to stop the National Party from coming to power; which it did in the 1924 South African general election.

The merger between the Unionists and the South African Party took place in November 1920. The enlarged party retained the name of the SAP.

== Party leaders ==
The first Unionist Party of South Africa leader, from May 1910, was Leander Starr Jameson. He was created a Baronet after the Union of South Africa came into existence and was thereafter known as Sir Leander Starr Jameson. Dr Jameson was famous as the leader of the ill-fated Jameson Raid before the Second Boer War. He had also been Prime Minister of Cape Colony from 1904 to 1908.

Jameson retired from the leadership in April 1912, when the Irish born Sir Thomas Smartt was unanimously elected as the new leader. Smartt had been a senior colleague of Jameson's, both in the Cape Colony Parliament and government and the Union House of Assembly. Smartt remained the Unionist leader until the fusion with the South African Party in November 1920.

== Electoral history ==
=== House of Assembly elections ===
Election	Party leader	Votes	%	Seats	+/–	Position	Result
1910	Leander Starr Jameson	39,766	37.65%	36 / 121	New	2nd	Opposition
1915	Thomas Smartt	49,917	19.41%	39 / 130	▲3	2nd	Supporting SAP minority government
1920	Thomas Smartt	38,946	14.03%	25 / 134	▼14	▼3rd	Supporting SAP minority government

== See also ==
- Dominion Party (South Africa) (1934-1948)
