= Orangia Unie =

Political party

Orangia Unie (United Orange) was a political party established in May 1906 in the Orange River Colony (formerly the Orange Free State) under the leadership of Abraham Fischer, Martinus Theunis Steyn and J. B. M. Hertzog. When the colony gained self-government in 1907, the party formed the government.

Upon the creation of the Union of South Africa in May 1910, it merged with Afrikaner Bond, the South African Party, and Het Volk, the dominant political parties of the Cape Colony and Transvaal, creating the pan-Union South African Party in 1911.
