= 1938 South African general election =

- 18 May 1938

All 150 general roll seats in the House of Assembly 76 seats needed for a majority
- Registered: 1,052,652
- Turnout: 79.36% (▲45.59pp)
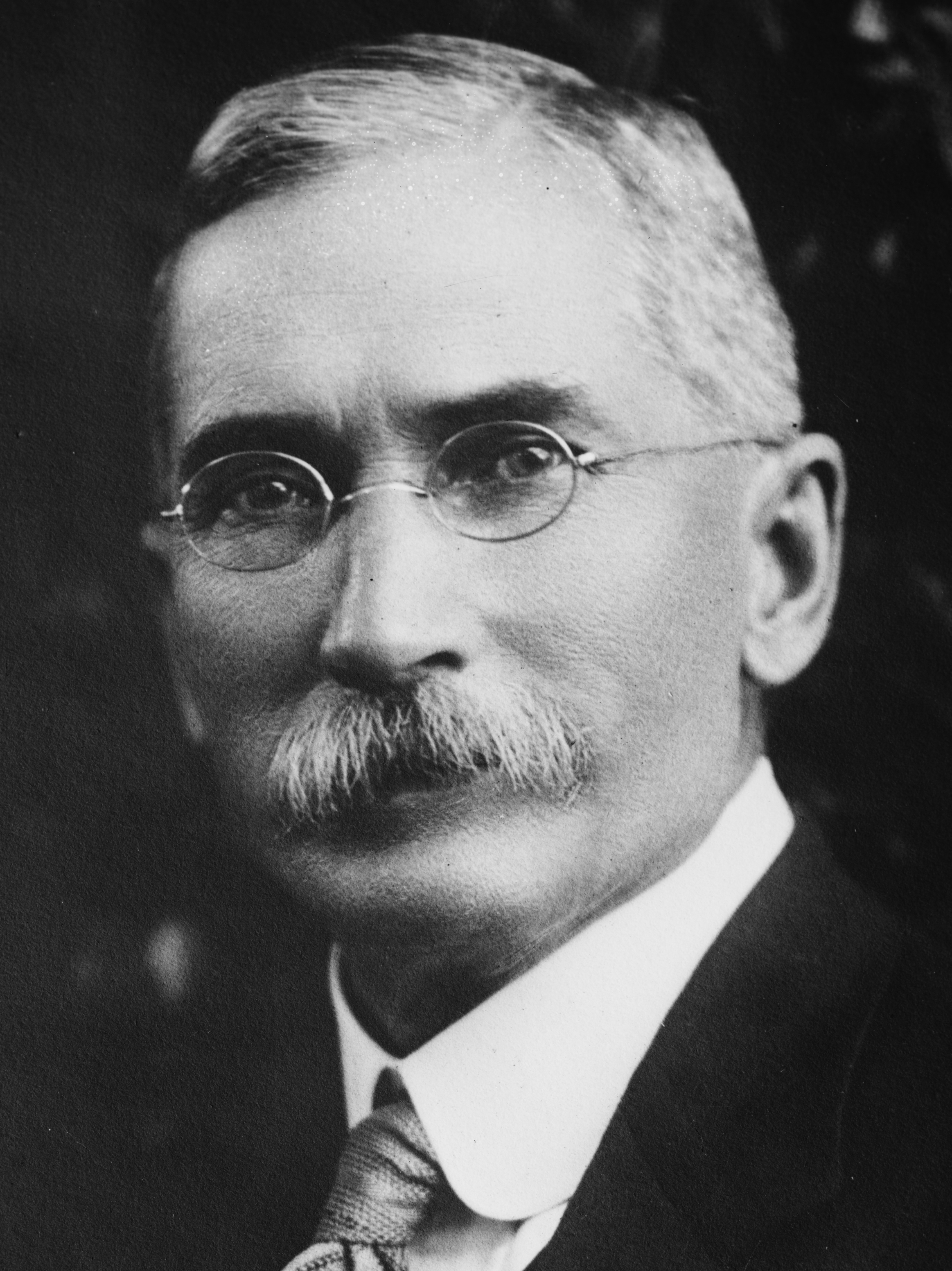

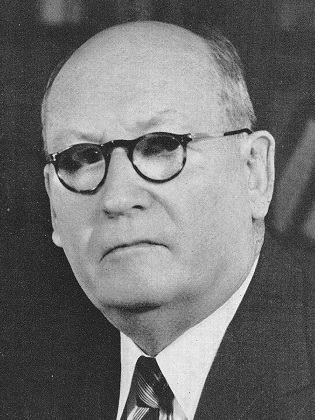

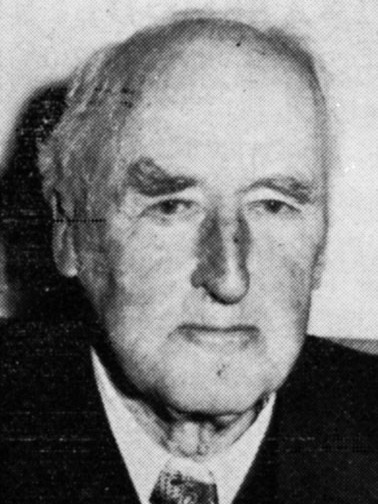

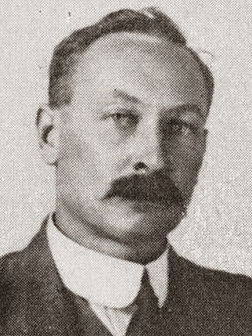
	First party	Second party
Leader	J. B. M. Hertzog	D. F. Malan
Party	United	Purified National
Leader's seat	Smithfield	Piketberg
Last election	53.95%, 136 seats (Note: National Party and South African Party combined.)	Did not exist
Seats won	111	27
Seat change	▼25	New party
Popular vote	446,032	259,543
Percentage	53.81%	31.31%
Swing	▼0.14pp	New party
	Third party	Fourth party
Leader	Charles Stallard	Walter Madeley
Party	Dominion	Labour
Leader's seat	Roodepoort (lost re-election)	Benoni
Last election	Did not exist	6.34%, 2 seats
Seats won	8	3
Seat change	New party	▲1
Popular vote	52,356	48,641
Percentage	6.32%	5.87%
Swing	New party	▼0.47pp
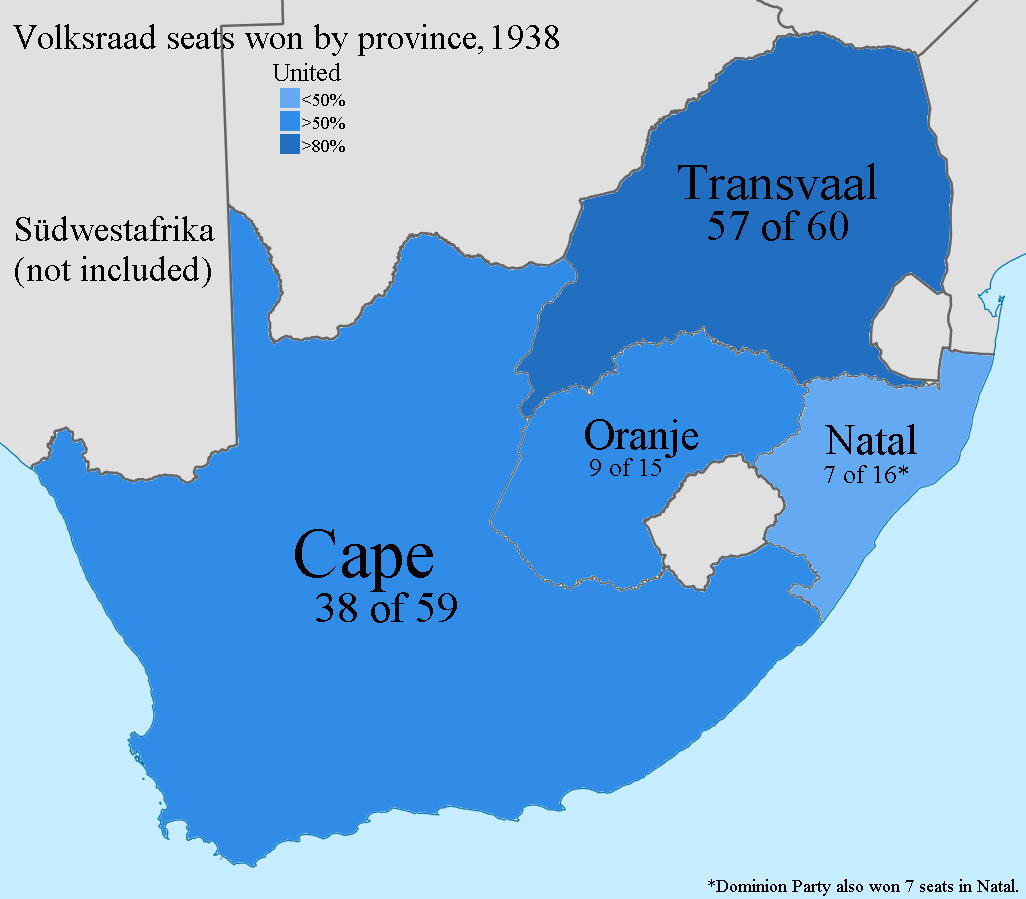
Prime Minister before election
J. B. M. Hertzog
United
Elected Prime Minister
J. B. M. Hertzog
United

General elections were held in South Africa on 18 May 1938 to elect the 150 members of the House of Assembly. The United Party won an absolute majority.

== Background ==
The National Party (led by the Prime Minister J. B. M. Hertzog) and the South African Party (whose leader was the Deputy Prime Minister Jan Smuts) were in coalition at the time of the 1933 South African general election.

After the election the two coalition parties fused, to become the United South African National Party (commonly known as the United Party). The formal launch of the new party took place on 5 December 1934.

Those members of the National Party who did not accept the fusion, constituted themselves as the Purified National Party (PNP) in June 1934. The leader of the new party was Dr. D. F. Malan, who had been the National Party leader in Cape Province. Eighteen MPs joined the PNP caucus. Dr. Malan became the Leader of the Opposition, in the House of Assembly.

The members of the South African Party who rejected the fusion, formed the Dominion Party. Its leader was Colonel C. F. Stallard.

== Changes to the franchise and representation ==
Under the Representation of Natives Act 1936, all registered black voters in the Cape Province were removed from the common voters' lists and placed on a special Cape Natives voters' roll. This served to effectively dismantle the traditional multi-racial "Cape Qualified Franchise" system, although the more numerous Coloured voters remained on the rolls for another twenty years until the advent of the first all-white voter rolls in 1958. The Native MPs were abolished in 1960.

Black voters had never been entitled to vote in Transvaal and the Orange Free State, under previous racial franchise rules under the Afrikaner republics preserved under the South Africa Act. Few had ever qualified in Natal.

The voters' rolls, for 1935, were broken down by race in each province (using the racial classifications in use in South Africa at the time).

Province	White	Native	Coloured	Asiatic
Cape	382,103	10,628	21,596	1,401
Natal	91,762	1	343	10
Transvaal	349,400	-	-	-
Orange FS	101,089	-	-	-

No black voters were eligible to participate in the 1938 general election, apart from the one from Natal. The three (white) Native Representative Members from Cape Province were elected on a different date, for a term (expiring on 30 June immediately following a period of five years after the previous election) unaffected by dissolutions of Parliament.

The first group of native representatives had been elected in June 1937. The term for which they were elected expired on 30 June 1942. The representatives took their seats in the House of Assembly in 1938, and sat as Independent MPs.

== Delimitation of electoral divisions ==
The South Africa Act 1909 had provided for a delimitation commission to define the boundaries for each electoral division. The representation by province, under the seventh delimitation report of 1937, is set out in the table below. The figures in brackets are the number of electoral divisions in the previous (1932) delimitation. If there is no figure in brackets then the number was unchanged.

Provinces	Cape	Natal	Orange Free State	Transvaal	Total
Divisions	59 (61)	16	15 (16)	60 (57)	150

The above table does not include the three Native representative seats in Cape Province, which were not included in the delimitation of the general roll seats under the South Africa Act 1909.

== Nominations ==
Candidates nominated for the election, by party, were United 150, Purified National 103, Labour 37, Dominion 33, Independent 31, Greyshirts 3 and Socialists 3. Total 360.

== Results ==
Party	Votes	%	Seats	+/–
United Party	446,032	53.81	111	–25
Purified National Party	259,543	31.31	27	New
Dominion Party	52,356	6.32	8	New
Labour Party	48,641	5.87	3	+1
Socialist Party	4,963	0.60	1	New
Independents	17,362	2.09	0	–10
Native Representative Members			3	New
Total	828,897	100.00	153	+3
Valid votes	828,897	99.22		
Invalid/blank votes	6,481	0.78		
Total votes	835,378	100.00		
Registered voters/turnout	1,052,652	79.36		
Source: South Africa 1982

=== By province ===
Province	United	Purified National	Dominion	Labour	Socialist	Total
Cape	38	20	1	-	-	59
Natal	7	-	7	1	1	16
Orange FS	9	6	-	-	-	15
Transvaal	57	1	-	2	-	60
Total	111	27	8	3	1	150
Source: Keesing's Contemporary Archives
