= 1921 South African general election =

- 8 February 1921

All 134 seats in the House of Assembly 68 seats needed for a majority
- Registered: 499,531
- Turnout: 55.60% (▼11.34pp)
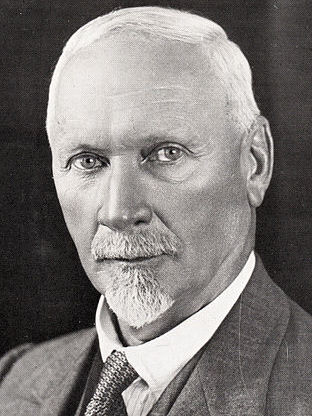

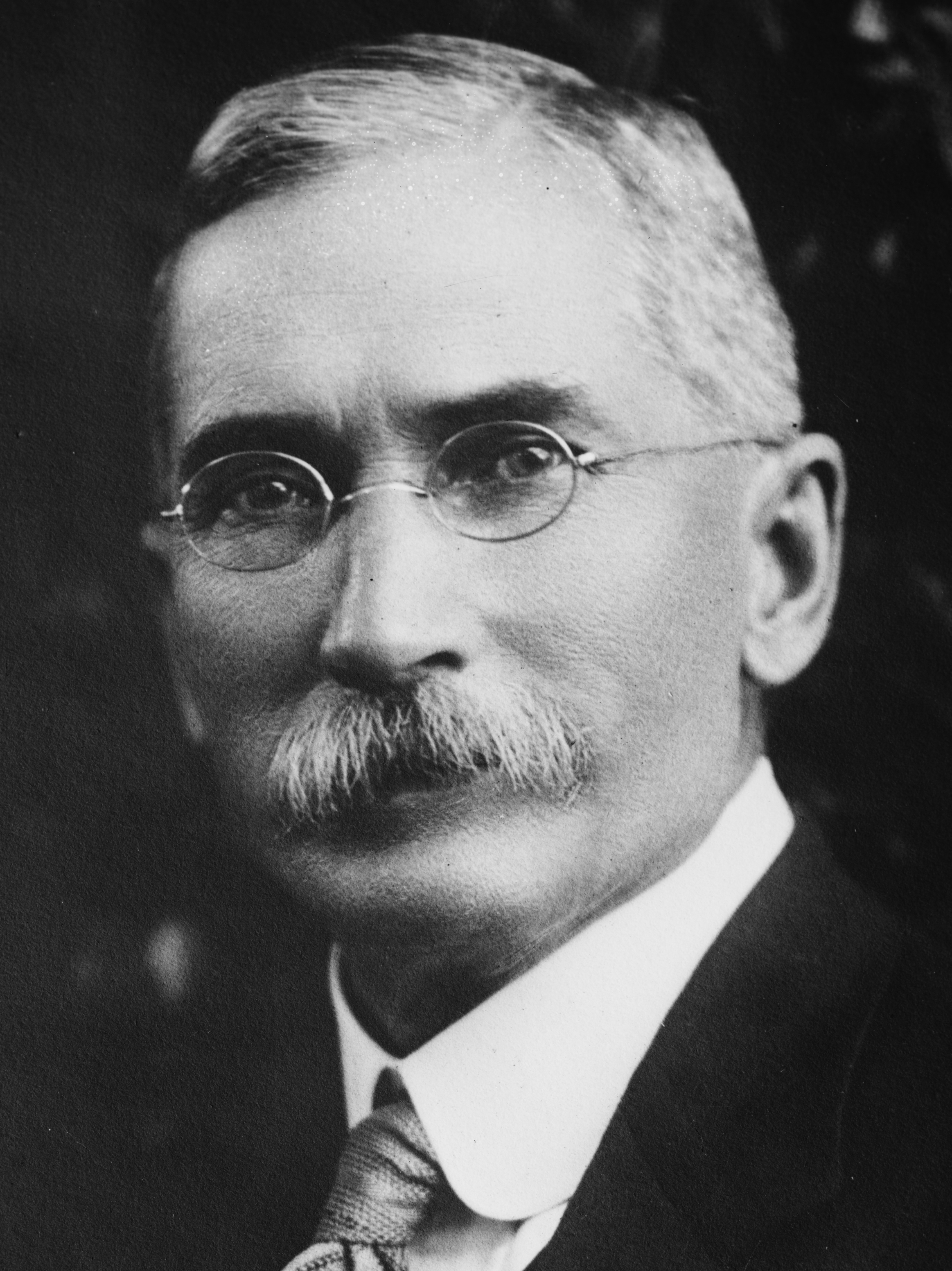

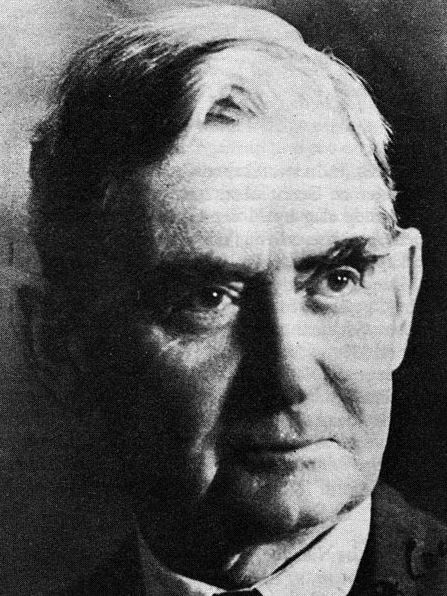
	First party	Second party	Third party
Leader	Jan Smuts	J. B. M. Hertzog	Frederic Creswell
Party	South African	National	Labour
Leader's seat	Pretoria West	Smithfield	Troyeville (lost re-election)
Last election	50.51%, 66 seats (Note: South African Party and Unionist Party combined.)	32.62%, 43 seats	14.65%, 21 seats
Seats won	77	44	10
Seat change	▲11	▲1	▼11
Popular vote	137,389	105,039	29,406
Percentage	49.90%	38.15%	10.68%
Swing	▼0.61pp	▲5.53pp	▼3.97pp
- Results by province
Prime Minister before election
Jan Smuts
South African
Elected Prime Minister
Jan Smuts
South African

General elections were held in South Africa on 8 February 1921 to elect the 134 members of the House of Assembly. The South African Party, which since the previous election had fused with the Unionist Party, won an absolute majority.

== Delimitation of electoral divisions ==
The South Africa Act 1909 had provided for a delimitation commission to define the boundaries for each electoral division. The representation by province, under the third delimitation report of 1919, is set out in the table below. The figures in brackets are the number of electoral divisions in the previous (1913) delimitation. If there is no figure in brackets then the number was unchanged.

The electoral divisions used for this general election were the same as those for the 1920 election.

Provinces	Cape	Natal	Orange Free State	Transvaal	Total
Divisions	51	17	17	49 (45)	134 (130)

== Results ==
Party	Votes	%	Seats	+/–
South African Party	137,389	49.90	77	+11
National Party	105,039	38.15	44	+1
Labour Party	29,406	10.68	10	–11
Socialist League	94	0.03	0	0
Independents	3,385	1.23	1	–2
Vacant			2	–
Total	275,313	100.00	134	0
Valid votes	275,313	99.13		
Invalid/blank votes	2,429	0.87		
Total votes	277,742	100.00		
Registered voters/turnout	499,531	55.60		
Source: Potgieter
