= 1924 South African general election =

- 17 June 1924

All 135 seats in the House of Assembly 68 seats needed for a majority
- Registered: 413,136
- Turnout: 77.23% (▲21.63pp)
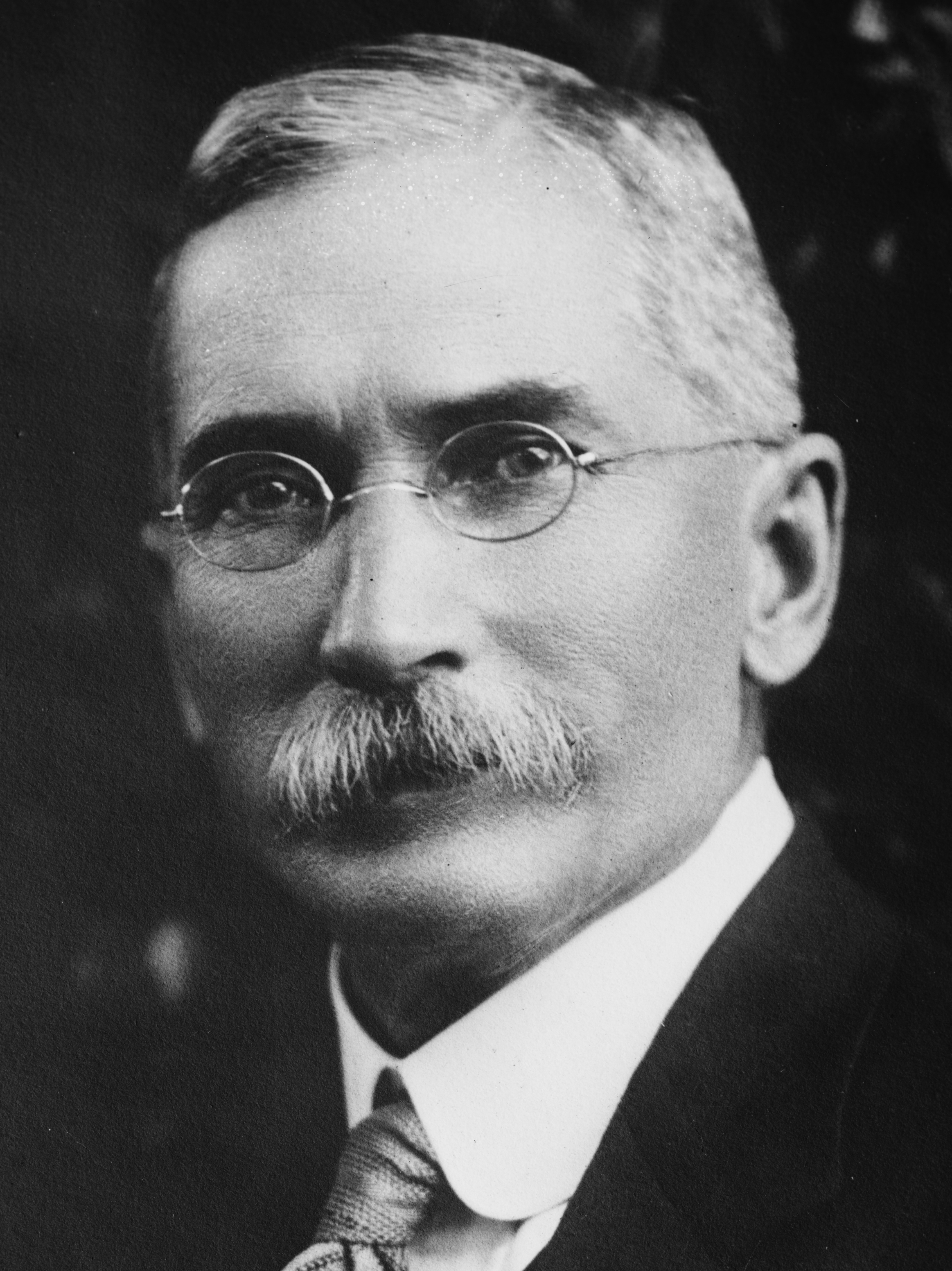

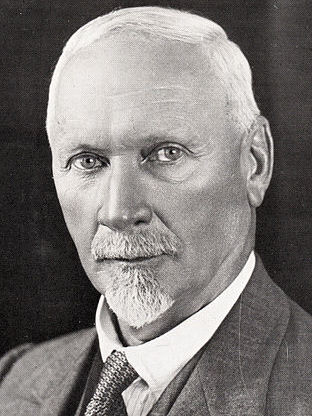

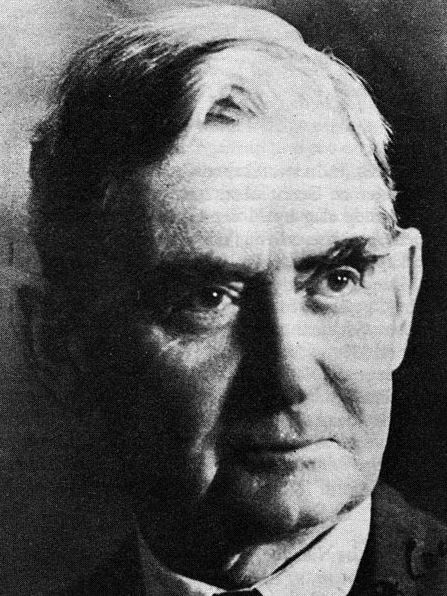
	First party	Second party	Third party
Leader	J. B. M. Hertzog	Jan Smuts	Frederic Creswell
Party	National	South African	Labour
Leader's seat	Smithfield	Pretoria West (lost re-election)	Denver
Last election	38.15%, 44 seats	49.92%, 77 seats	10.68%, 10 seats
Seats won	63	53	18
Seat change	▲19	▼24	▲8
Popular vote	111,483	148,769	45,380
Percentage	35.25%	47.04%	14.35%
Swing	▼2.90pp	▼2.86pp	▲3.67pp
- Results by province
Prime Minister before election
Jan Smuts
South African
Elected Prime Minister
J. B. M. Hertzog
National

General elections were held in South Africa on 17 June 1924, electing 135 members of the House of Assembly. Considered a realigning election, rising discontent with the government of Jan Smuts led to the defeat of his government by a coalition of the pro-Afrikaner National Party and the South African Labour Party, a socialist party representing the interests of the white proletariat.

Smuts had angered South African nationalists by his moderate stance on South African independence from the British Empire. The worldwide depression after the end of the First World War had led to a strike in South Africa, known as the Rand Rebellion, which had been defused through a combination of military force and negotiation with the outgunned unions, earning Smuts the enmity of the labour vote. As a consequence Smuts's SAP was defeated by a Nationalist–Labour Pact, J. B. M. Hertzog formed the government and became Prime Minister – a position he was to hold until 1939.

== Delimitation of electoral divisions ==
The South Africa Act 1909 had provided for a delimitation commission to define the boundaries for each electoral division. The representation by province, under the fourth delimitation report of 1923, is set out in the table below. The figures in brackets are the number of electoral divisions in the previous (1919) delimitation. If there is no figure in brackets then the number was unchanged.

Provinces	Cape	Natal	Orange Free State	Transvaal	Total
Divisions	51	17	17	50 (49)	135 (134)

== Results ==
Party	Votes	%	Seats	+/–
South African Party	148,769	47.04	53	–24
National Party	111,483	35.25	63	+19
Labour Party	45,380	14.35	18	+8
Independents	10,610	3.36	1	0
Total	316,242	100.00	135	+1
Valid votes	316,242	99.12		
Invalid/blank votes	2,805	0.88		
Total votes	319,047	100.00		
Registered voters/turnout	413,136	77.23		
Source: South Africa 1982
