= 1915 South African general election =

- 20 October 1915

All 130 seats in the House of Assembly 66 seats needed for a majority
- Registered: 365,307
- Turnout: 71.57%
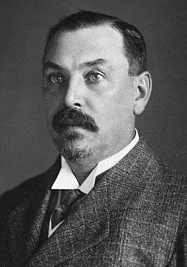

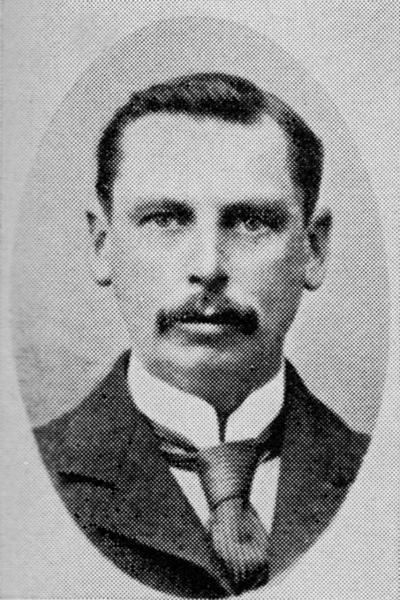

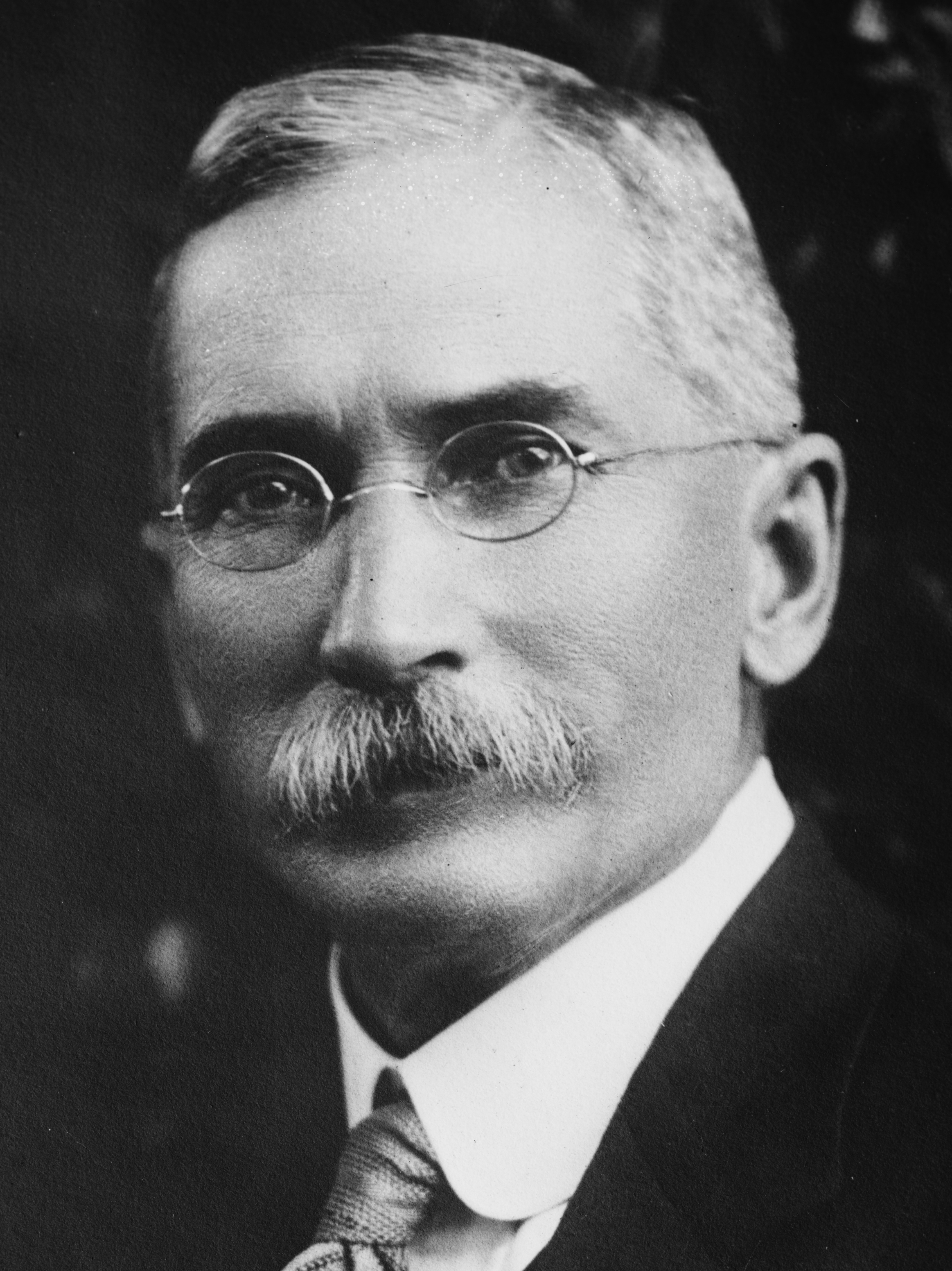

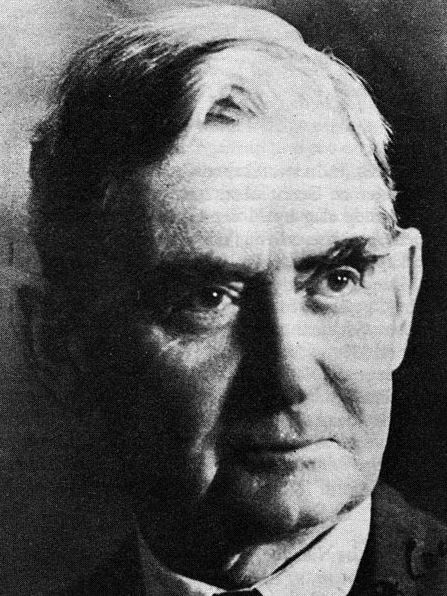
	First party	Second party
Leader	Louis Botha	Thomas Smartt
Party	South African	Unionist
Leader's seat	Losberg	Fort Beaufort
Last election	28.45%, 66 seats	37.65%, 36 seats
Seats won	54	39
Seat change	▼12	▲3
Popular vote	94,285	49,917
Percentage	36.67%	19.41%
Swing	▲8.22pp	▼18.24pp
	Third party	Fourth party
Leader	J. B. M. Hertzog	Frederic Creswell
Party	National	Labour
Leader's seat	Smithfield	stood in Bezuidenhout
Last election	Did not exist	10.93%, 3 seats
Seats won	27	4
Seat change	New party	▲1
Popular vote	75,623	24,755
Percentage	29.41%	9.63%
Swing	New party	▼1.30pp
- Results by province
Prime Minister before election
Louis Botha
South African
Elected Prime Minister
Louis Botha
South African

General elections were held in South Africa on 20 October 1915 to elect the 130 members of the House of Assembly. This was the second Union Parliament. The governing South African Party (SAP) of General Louis Botha emerged from the elections as the largest party, but did not receive an overall majority.

Botha formed a minority government, which survived with some parliamentary support from the official opposition Unionist Party.

== Delimitation of electoral divisions ==
The South Africa Act 1909 had provided for a delimitation commission to define the boundaries for each electoral division. The representation by province, under the second delimitation report of 1913, is set out in the table below. The figures in brackets are the number of electoral divisions in the previous (1910) delimitation. If there is no figure in brackets then the number was unchanged.

Provinces	Cape	Natal	Orange Free State	Transvaal	Total
Divisions	51	17	17	45 (36)	130 (121)

== Nominations ==
Since the last general election, the National Party (NP) had split away from the South African Party (SAP). The formal foundation of the new party had been in 1914.

Eight of the 130 seats were uncontested. There were unopposed returns for 5 Unionist Party, 2 SAP and 1 NP candidates.

In the 122 contested constituencies, the candidates nominated included 86 SAP, 83 NP, 39 Unionist and 49 Labour.

== Party attitudes ==
General Botha stood for a policy of conciliation between Afrikaans and English speaking white people. The SAP was mostly supported by moderates of both races. General Hertzog led a republican party which supported a two streams policy – the two white races developing separately. The Unionists were anxious to maintain the imperial connection. The Unionists accordingly preferred the continuation in power of the SAP to the prospect of an NP government.

== Results ==
The vote totals in the table below may not give a complete picture of the balance of political opinion, because of unopposed elections (where no votes were cast) and because most contested seats were not fought by a candidate from all major parties.

The 27 NP candidates elected represented three of the four provinces - 7 from Cape Province, 16 from the Orange Free State and 4 from Transvaal.

Party	Votes	%	Seats	+/–
South African Party	94,285	36.67	54	–12
National Party	75,623	29.41	27	New
Unionist Party	49,917	19.42	39	+3
Labour Party	24,755	9.63	4	+1
Socialist League	140	0.05	0	New
Independents	12,383	4.82	6	–10
Total	257,103	100.00	130	+9
Valid votes	257,103	98.34		
Invalid/blank votes	4,330	1.66		
Total votes	261,433	100.00		
Registered voters/turnout	365,307	71.57		
Source: Nohlen et al.
