= 1910 South African general election =

- 15 September 1910

All 121 seats in the House of Assembly 61 seats needed for a majority
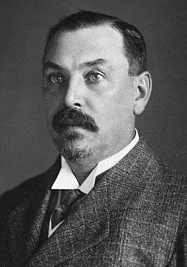

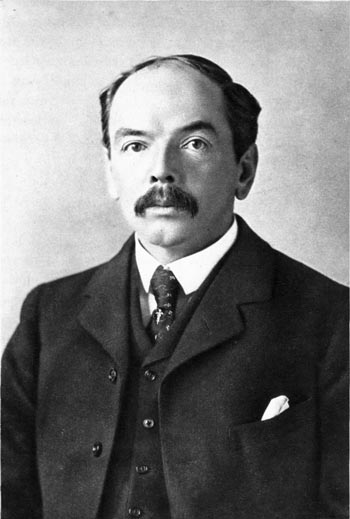

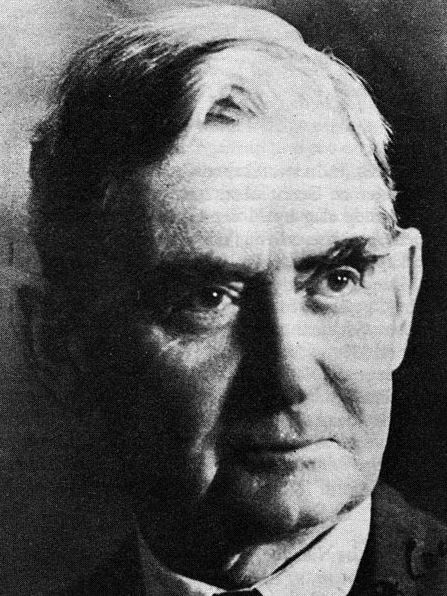
	First party	Second party	Third party
Leader	Louis Botha	Leander Starr Jameson	Frederic Creswell
Party	South African, Orangia Unie, and Het Volk	Unionist	Labour
Leader's seat	stood in Pretoria East	Albany	Jeppes
Seats won	66	36	3
Popular vote	30,052	39,766	11,549
Percentage	28.45%	37.65%	10.93%
Elected Prime Minister
Louis Botha
South African

General elections were held in South Africa on 15 September 1910 to elect the 121 members of the House of Assembly. They were the first general election after the Union of South Africa was created on 31 May 1910.

The elections were held alongside the first election to the provincial councils of Cape Province and Transvaal. Those councils used the same electoral districts as those for the House of Assembly seats in the province. The first election for the provincial councils of Natal and Orange Free State, which did not use the same constituency boundaries as the House of Assembly, took place at a later date.

Although the Unionist Party received the most votes, the alliance of parties led by General Louis Botha won a slim majority. The Unionist Party became the official opposition. Botha's alliance would later unite as the South African Party.

== Electoral system ==
The South Africa Act 1909 provided that the franchise in each province should be the same as that in the corresponding colony before the Union, until altered by the Union Parliament. The Act included entrenching clauses, providing that black and coloured voters could only be removed from the common voters roll in the Cape of Good Hope, by legislation passed by a two-thirds majority by both houses of Parliament in joint session.

The franchise, in all parts of the Union, was limited to men over the age of 21. There were some additional qualifications and disqualifications which varied between provinces.

The franchise in the Orange Free State and Transvaal was limited to white men.

Map showing the % of non-white voters by electoral district in Cape Colony in 1908 - on the eve of union.

The traditional "Cape Qualified Franchise" system of the Cape of Good Hope was based on property and wage qualifications, equally open to people of all races. At the time of the National Convention in 1908, which drafted the terms of what became the South Africa Act, "22,784 Native and Coloured persons out of a total of 152,221 electors" were entitled to vote in Cape elections.

Natal had a theoretically non-racial franchise, but in practice few non-white electors ever qualified. It was estimated, in 1908, that "200 non-Europeans out of a total of 22,786 electors had secured franchise rights".

The South Africa Act 1909 provided for single member electoral divisions, with members of the House of Assembly being elected using the relative majority (also known as first past the post) electoral system. The act also provided for a delimitation commission to define the boundaries for each electoral division.

Provinces	Cape	Natal	Orange Free State	Transvaal	Total
Seats	51	17	17	36	121

== Contesting parties ==
=== South African National Party ===
The first Union Prime Minister (and former Transvaal Prime Minister), General Botha, assembled an electoral alliance before the first Union election. This grouping was composed of the governing parties of three of the colonies being united and some individual politicians from Natal (which did not have a pre-Union party system).

The colonial parties involved were:

- the South African Party of the Cape Colony (itself largely based on the Afrikaner Bond)
- Het Volk from the Transvaal
- Orangia Unie from the Orange River Colony (which was restored to its pre-1902 name of Orange Free State as a province of the Union).

=== Unionist Party ===
The 'Unionist Party of South Africa was formed, in May 1910, under the leadership of Leander Starr Jameson (a former Prime Minister of Cape Colony), by the merger of the three colonial opposition parties joined by some individual politicians from Natal.

The parties merged into the Unionist Party were the:

- Unionist Party of Cape Colony (formerly known as the Cape Progressive Party)
- Constitutional Party of the Orange River Colony
- Progressive Party of Transvaal

The party was a pro-British conservative party. It favoured the maintenance of a pro-British political culture in South Africa similar to that present in the other 'white dominions'.

=== Labour Party ===
The South African Labour Party, formed in March 1910 following discussions between trade unions, the Transvaal Independent Labour Party and the Natal Labour Party, was a professedly socialist party representing the interests of the white working class. The party leader was Colonel F. H. P. Creswell.

== Results ==
Popular vote figures may be misleading as 54 of the 121 seats went unopposed. This includes the two Independent Unionists.

Party	Votes	%	Seats
Unionist Party	39,766	37.65	36
South African National Party	30,052	28.45	66
Labour Party	11,549	10.93	3
Socialist Party	448	0.42	0
Independent South African National Party	3,430	3.25	1
Independent Labour Party	815	0.77	1
Independent Unionist Party			2
Independents	19,563	18.52	12
Total	105,623	100.00	121
Source: Van der Waag, Schoeman
