= Results of the 1915 South African general election =

- 20 October 1915

All 130 seats in the House of Assembly 66 seats needed for a majority
- Registered: 365,307
- Turnout: 71.57%
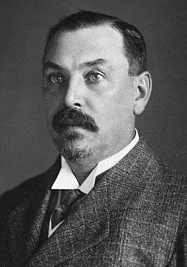

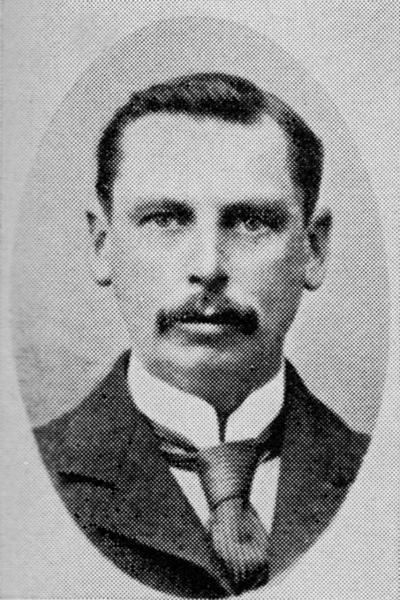

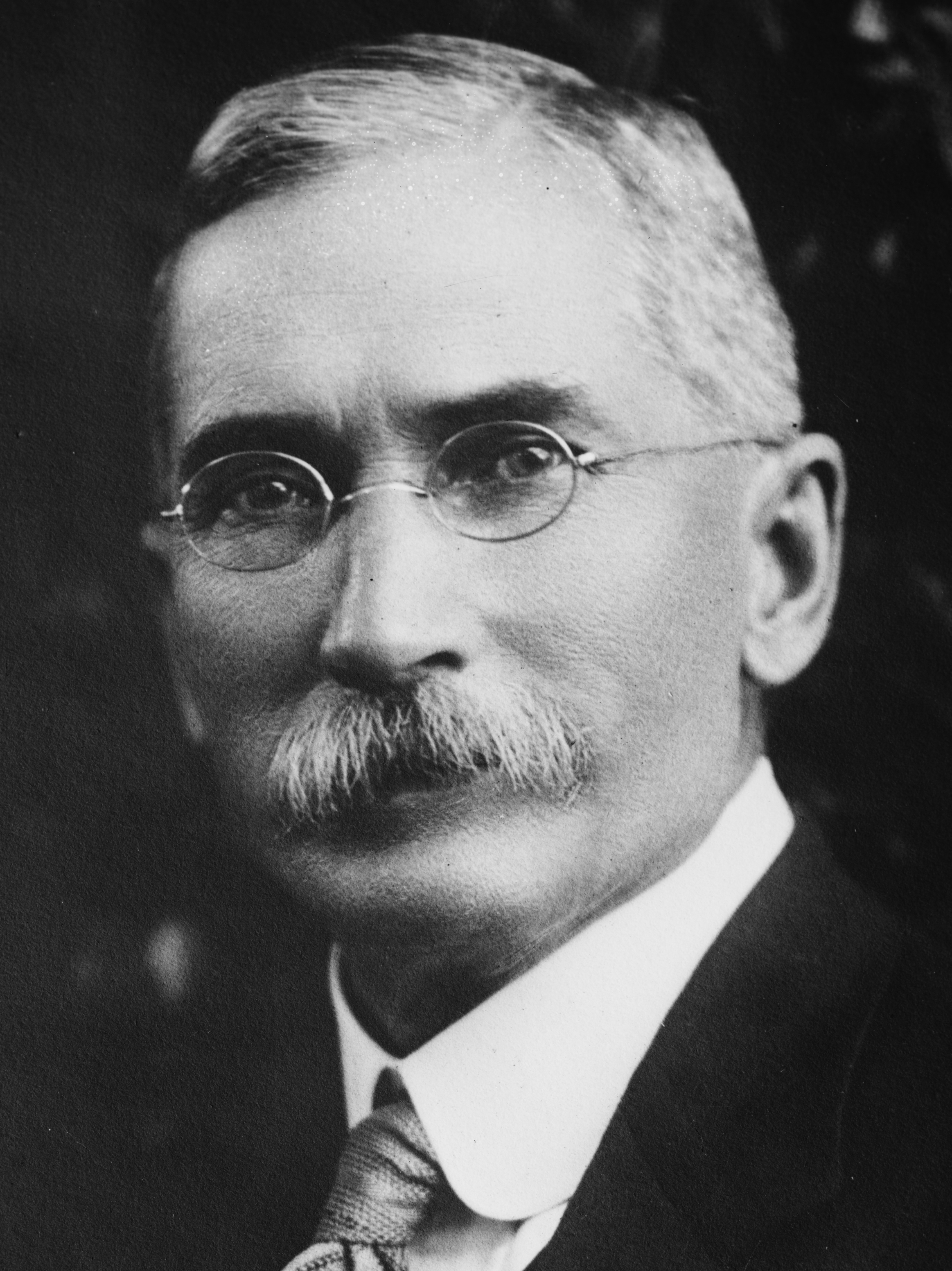

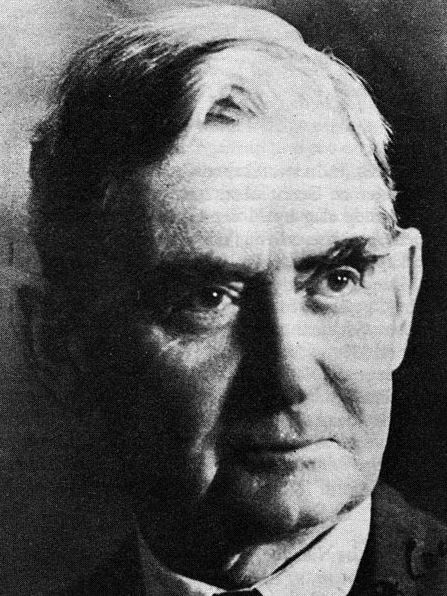
	First party	Second party
Leader	Louis Botha	Thomas Smartt
Party	South African	Unionist
Leader's seat	Losberg	Fort Beaufort
Last election	28.45%, 66 seats	37.65%, 36 seats
Seats won	54	39
Seat change	▼12	▲3
Popular vote	94,285	49,917
Percentage	36.67%	19.41%
Swing	▲8.22pp	▼18.24pp
	Third party	Fourth party
Leader	J. B. M. Hertzog	Frederic Creswell
Party	National	Labour
Leader's seat	Smithfield	stood in Bezuidenhout
Last election	Did not exist	10.93%, 3 seats
Seats won	27	4
Seat change	New party	▲1
Popular vote	75,623	24,755
Percentage	29.41%	9.63%
Swing	New party	▼1.30pp
- Results by province
Prime Minister before election
Louis Botha
South African
Elected Prime Minister
Louis Botha
South African

This is a list of constituency results for the 1915 South African general election.

== Boundary changes ==
The Second Delimitation Commission (1913) expanded the House of Assembly from 121 to 130 seats, with all nine new seats going to the Transvaal, but the Commission also made significant changes to the Cape Province's constituency boundaries. The smaller provinces of Natal and the Orange Free State were largely left unchanged.

Province	Seats 1910	Created	Abolished	Seats 1915
Cape of Good Hope	51	Calvinia; Rondebosch	Clanwilliam; Jansenville	51
Natal	17			17
Orange Free State	17			17
Transvaal	36	Benoni; Bethal; Bezuidenhout; Hospital; Klerksdorp; Maraisburg; Ophirton; Parktown; Pretoria Central; Randfontein; Siemert; Witwatersberg	Braamfontein; Jeppes; Roodepoort	45

== Cape Province ==
Party	Votes	%	Seats
South African Party	46,219	37.81	21
National Party	35,264	28.85	7
Unionist Party	26,551	21.72	20
Labour Party	7,348	6.01	1
Independents	6,847	5.60	2
Total	122,229	100.00	51
Source: Schoeman

Unopposed candidates: Unionists 2.

=== Albany ===
General election 1915: Albany
Party	Candidate	Votes	%	±%
Unionist	Frederick van der Riet	1,196	51.8	N/A
South African	W. M. Espin	1,111	48.2	New
Majority		85	3.6	N/A
Turnout		2,307	69.8	N/A
Unionist hold		Swing	N/A	

=== Albert ===
General election 1915: Albert
Party	Candidate	Votes	%	±%
National	L. P. Vorster	1,403	54.7	New
South African	Henry Burton	1,164	45.3	N/A
Majority		239	9.4	N/A
Turnout		2,567	90.0	N/A
National gain from South African		Swing	N/A	

=== Aliwal ===
General election 1915: Aliwal
Party	Candidate	Votes	%	±%
South African	C. A. Schweizer	1,405	64.7	N/A
National	H. S. van Zyl	768	35.3	New
Majority		637	29.4	N/A
Turnout		2,173	81.5	N/A
South African hold		Swing	N/A	

=== Barkly ===
General election 1915: Barkly
Party	Candidate	Votes	%	±%
Unionist	A. H. Watkins	1,403	69.6	N/A
National	J. C. Scholtz	585	29.0	New
Independent	H. D. Roux	27	1.3	New
Majority		818	40.6	N/A
Turnout		2,015	64.1	N/A
Unionist hold		Swing	N/A	

=== Beaconsfield ===
General election 1915: Beaconsfield
Party	Candidate	Votes	%	±%
Independent	Sir David Harris	1,298	81.2	N/A
Labour	G. A. Hay	301	18.8	New
Majority		997	62.4	N/A
Turnout		1,599	50.9	N/A
Independent hold		Swing	N/A	

=== Beaufort West ===
General election 1915: Beaufort West
Party	Candidate	Votes	%	±%
South African	O. A. Oosthuizen	1,536	50.9	N/A
National	W. A. Hofmeyr	1,480	49.1	New
Majority		56	1.8	N/A
Turnout		3,016	81.7	N/A
South African hold		Swing	N/A	

=== Bechuanaland ===
General election 1915: Bechuanaland
Party	Candidate	Votes	%	±%
South African	D. H. W. Wessels	1,668	56.1	N/A
National	J. J. Booysen	1,303	43.9	New
Majority		365	12.2	N/A
Turnout		2,971	73.3	N/A
South African hold		Swing	N/A	

=== Border ===
General election 1915: Border
Party	Candidate	Votes	%	±%
Unionist	George Blaine	1,150	61.1	N/A
Independent	T. A. Stephen	731	38.9	New
Majority		419	3.6	N/A
Turnout		1,881	60.7	N/A
Unionist hold		Swing	N/A	

=== Caledon ===
General election 1915: Caledon
Party	Candidate	Votes	%	±%
South African	Joel Krige	1,652	64.0	N/A
National	P. J. Cillié	928	36.0	New
Majority		724	28.0	N/A
Turnout		2,580	85.1	N/A
South African hold		Swing	N/A	

=== Calvinia ===
General election 1915: Calvinia
Party	Candidate	Votes	%	±%
National	W. P. Louw	1,327	56.4	New
South African	H. J. Nel	1,024	43.6	New
Majority		301	12.8	N/A
Turnout		2,351	82.8	N/A
National win (new seat)				

=== Cape Town Castle ===
General election 1915: Cape Town Castle
Party	Candidate	Votes	%	±%
Unionist	Morris Alexander	Unopposed		
Unionist hold				

=== Cape Town Central ===
General election 1915: Cape Town Central
Party	Candidate	Votes	%	±%
Unionist	John William Jagger	1,595	66.0	−19.1
Labour	W. J. Laite	820	34.0	New
Majority		775	32.0	N/A
Turnout		2,415	70.2	N/A
Unionist hold		Swing	N/A	

=== Cape Town Gardens ===
General election 1915: Cape Town Gardens
Party	Candidate	Votes	%	±%
Unionist	William Duncan Baxter	1,700	68.7	+8.3
Labour	Robert Forsyth	773	31.3	New
Majority		927	37.4	N/A
Turnout		2,473	60.5	N/A
Unionist hold		Swing	N/A	

=== Cape Town Harbour ===
General election 1915: Cape Town Harbour
Party	Candidate	Votes	%	±%
Unionist	Lawrence Woodhead	2,092	74.2	+4.1
Labour	A. F. Betty	726	25.8	New
Majority		812	48.4	N/A
Turnout		2,818	59.3	N/A
Unionist hold		Swing	N/A	

=== Ceres ===
General election 1915: Ceres
Party	Candidate	Votes	%	±%
South African	J. G. du Toit	1,388	55.8	N/A
National	J. W. J. W. Roux	1,099	44.2	New
Majority		289	11.6	N/A
Turnout		2,487	82.0	N/A
South African hold		Swing	N/A	

=== Colesberg ===
General election 1915: Colesberg
Party	Candidate	Votes	%	±%
South African	G. A. Louw	1,424	55.3	N/A
National	J. A. Venter	1,151	44.7	New
Majority		273	10.6	N/A
Turnout		2,575	85.2	N/A
South African hold		Swing	N/A	

=== Cradock ===
General election 1915: Cradock
Party	Candidate	Votes	%	±%
South African	Harry van Heerden	1,488	55.5	N/A
National	D. F. Malan	1,195	44.5	New
Majority		293	11.0	N/A
Turnout		2,683	88.2	N/A
South African hold		Swing	N/A	

=== East London ===
General election 1915: East London
Party	Candidate	Votes	%	±%
Unionist	C. P. Crewe	1,478	47.3	−19.8
Labour	James Stewart	1,214	38.8	New
Independent	F. L. Gregg	435	13.9	New
Majority		264	8.5	N/A
Turnout		3,127	64.8	N/A
Unionist hold		Swing	N/A	

=== Fort Beaufort ===
General election 1915: Fort Beaufort
Party	Candidate	Votes	%	±%
Unionist	Thomas Smartt	1,616	73.6	N/A
South African	G. C. Vosloo	580	26.4	New
Majority		1,036	47.2	N/A
Turnout		2,196	76.2	N/A
Unionist hold		Swing	N/A	

=== George ===
General election 1915: George
Party	Candidate	Votes	%	±%
National	H. P. Raubenheimer	1,392	52.6	New
South African	H. J. Raubenheimer	1,255	47.4	N/A
Majority		137	5.2	N/A
Turnout		2,647	80.9	N/A
National gain from South African		Swing	N/A	

=== Graaff-Reinet ===
General election 1915: Graaff-Reinet
Party	Candidate	Votes	%	±%
National	J. M. Enslin	1,234	53.6	New
South African	G. H. Maasdorp	1,067	46.4	−36.1
Majority		167	7.2	N/A
Turnout		2,301	80.0	N/A
National gain from South African		Swing	N/A	

=== Griqualand ===
General election 1915: Griqualand
Party	Candidate	Votes	%	±%
Unionist	J. G. King	1,718	84.2	+27.7
National	A. van Zijl	323	15.8	New
Majority		1,395	68.4	N/A
Turnout		2,041	64.8	N/A
Unionist hold		Swing	N/A	

=== Hopetown ===
General election 1915: Hopetown
Party	Candidate	Votes	%	±%
South African	P. S. Cilliers	1,474	63.7	N/A
National	N. D. Geldenhuys	840	36.3	New
Majority		634	27.4	N/A
Turnout		2,314	76.0	N/A
South African hold		Swing	N/A	

=== Humansdorp ===
General election 1915: Humansdorp
Party	Candidate	Votes	%	±%
National	Charl W. Malan	1,494	53.4	New
South African	J. M. Rademeyer	1,302	46.6	−7.7
Majority		192	6.8	N/A
Turnout		2,796	92.2	N/A
National gain from South African		Swing	N/A	

=== Kimberley ===
General election 1915: Kimberley
Party	Candidate	Votes	%	±%
Unionist	H. A. Oliver	1,434	73.5	+7.8
Labour	Frederic Creswell	516	26.5	−7.8
Majority		918	47.0	+15.6
Turnout		1,950	63.4	N/A
Unionist hold		Swing	+7.8	

=== King William's Town ===
General election 1915: King William's Town
Party	Candidate	Votes	%	±%
Independent	George Whitaker	1,607	59.2	N/A
South African	L. W. Luyt	1,108	40.8	New
Majority		499	18.4	N/A
Turnout		2,715	79.9	N/A
Independent hold		Swing	N/A	

=== Ladismith ===
General election 1915: Ladismith
Party	Candidate	Votes	%	±%
South African	H. C. Becker	1,442	52.1	N/A
National	J. J. M. van Zijl	1,302	47.0	New
Labour	C. F. Marincowitz	26	0.9	New
Majority		140	5.1	N/A
Turnout		2,770	90.4	N/A
South African hold		Swing	N/A	

=== Liesbeek ===
General election 1915: Liesbeek
Party	Candidate	Votes	%	±%
Labour	Thomas Maginess	1,143	43.3	N/A
Independent	B. Upington	1,142	43.3	New
National	H. Stiglingh	352	13.3	New
Majority		1	0.0	N/A
Turnout		2,637	64.8	N/A
Labour gain from Unionist		Swing	N/A	

=== Malmesbury ===
General election 1915: Malmesbury
Party	Candidate	Votes	%	±%
South African	F. S. Malan	1,519	57.5	N/A
National	A. P. W. Immelman	1,125	42.5	New
Majority		394	15.0	N/A
Turnout		2,644	88.4	N/A
South African hold		Swing	N/A	

=== Namaqualand ===
General election 1915: Namaqualand
Party	Candidate	Votes	%	±%
South African	Sir David Graaff, Bt.	1,140	55.0	N/A
National	A. H. Stander	708	34.1	New
Independent	J. Studer	226	10.9	New
Majority		432	20.9	N/A
Turnout		2,074	77.6	N/A
South African hold		Swing	N/A	

=== Newlands ===
General election 1915: Newlands
Party	Candidate	Votes	%	±%
Unionist	G. S. Withinshaw	1,672	79.7	+17.0
Labour	C. H. Hagger	425	20.3	New
Majority		1,247	59.4	N/A
Turnout		2,097	55.4	N/A
Unionist hold		Swing	N/A	

=== Oudtshoorn ===
General election 1915: Oudtshoorn
Party	Candidate	Votes	%	±%
South African	J. H. Schoeman	1,350	55.0	−8.6
National	C. J. Langenhoven	1,069	43.5	New
Labour	A. F. Symons	36	1.5	New
Majority		281	11.5	N/A
Turnout		2,455	75.9	N/A
South African hold		Swing	N/A	

=== Paarl ===
General election 1915: Paarl
Party	Candidate	Votes	%	±%
South African	A. L. de Jager	1,785	64.5	+13.8
National	W. B. de Villiers	982	35.5	New
Majority		805	29.0	N/A
Turnout		2,767	87.0	N/A
South African hold		Swing	N/A	

=== Piketberg ===
General election 1915: Piketberg
Party	Candidate	Votes	%	±%
National	J. H. H. de Waal	1,387	56.2	New
South African	W. J. van der Merwe	1,082	43.8	N/A
Majority		305	12.4	N/A
Turnout		2,469	84.5	N/A
National gain from South African		Swing	N/A	

=== Port Elizabeth Central ===
General election 1915: Port Elizabeth Central
Party	Candidate	Votes	%	±%
Unionist	E. H. Walton	Unopposed		
Unionist hold				

=== Port Elizabeth Southwest ===
General election 1915: Port Elizabeth Southwest
Party	Candidate	Votes	%	±%
Unionist	William Macintosh	1,855	75.7	New
Labour	A. J. C. Webb	596	24.3	New
Majority		1,259	51.4	N/A
Turnout		2,451	74.0	N/A
Unionist gain from Independent		Swing	N/A	

=== Prieska ===
General election 1915: Prieska
Party	Candidate	Votes	%	±%
South African	J. P. Coetzee	1,154	55.7	N/A
National	J. H. Conradie	914	44.1	New
South African	R. W. F. Steyn	4	0.2	New
Majority		240	11.6	N/A
Turnout		2,072	71.3	N/A
South African hold		Swing	N/A	

=== Queenstown ===
General election 1915: Queenstown
Party	Candidate	Votes	%	±%
Unionist	W. B. Berry	1,380	67.4	+12.2
South African	L. H. Brinkman	668	32.6	New
Majority		712	34.8	N/A
Turnout		2,048	70.5	N/A
Unionist hold		Swing	N/A	

=== Riversdale ===
General election 1915: Riversdale
Party	Candidate	Votes	%	±%
South African	A. I. Vintcent	1,740	57.0	N/A
National	J. F. Badenhorst	1,315	43.0	New
Majority		425	14.0	N/A
Turnout		3,055	89.3	N/A
South African hold		Swing	N/A	

=== Rondebosch ===
General election 1915: Rondebosch
Party	Candidate	Votes	%	±%
Unionist	R. W. Close	1,286	57.9	New
Independent	A. Palmer	895	40.3	New
Labour	I. Carver	41	1.8	New
Majority		391	17.6	N/A
Turnout		2,222	61.2	N/A
Unionist win (new seat)				

=== Somerset ===
General election 1915: Somerset
Party	Candidate	Votes	%	±%
South African	Andries Stockenström	1,398	52.2	N/A
National	H. J. Moolman	1,278	47.8	New
Majority		120	4.4	N/A
Turnout		2,676	86.7	N/A
South African hold		Swing	N/A	

=== South Peninsula ===
General election 1915: South Peninsula
Party	Candidate	Votes	%	±%
Unionist	Murray Bisset	1,440	55.4	−3.0
South African	A. J. Chiappini	734	28.3	+23.9
National	R. Cloete	280	10.8	New
Labour	C. Hughes	144	5.5	New
Majority		706	27.1	N/A
Turnout		2,598	70.4	N/A
Unionist hold		Swing	N/A	

=== Stellenbosch ===
General election 1915: Stellenbosch
Party	Candidate	Votes	%	±%
South African	John X. Merriman	1,674	66.2	+12.5
National	C. L. Marais	856	33.8	New
Majority		818	32.4	N/A
Turnout		2,530	87.4	N/A
South African hold		Swing	N/A	

=== Swellendam ===
General election 1915: Swellendam
Party	Candidate	Votes	%	±%
South African	J. W. van Eeden	1,895	68.7	N/A
National	N. J. Ackermann	864	31.3	New
Majority		1,031	37.4	N/A
Turnout		2,759	85.3	N/A
South African hold		Swing	N/A	

=== Tembuland ===
General election 1915: Tembuland
Party	Candidate	Votes	%	±%
Unionist	W. H. Stuart	1,171	47.3	N/A
South African	C. P. Bligh-Wall	785	31.7	New
National	W. E. Warner	518	20.9	New
Majority		386	15.6	N/A
Turnout		2,474	74.5	N/A
Unionist hold		Swing	N/A	

=== Three Rivers ===
General election 1915: Three Rivers
Party	Candidate	Votes	%	±%
Unionist	D. M. Brown	1,171	41.0	N/A
South African	J. Wynne	868	30.4	New
National	A. H. du Preez	815	28.6	New
Majority		303	10.6	N/A
Turnout		2,854	80.0	N/A
Unionist hold		Swing	N/A	

=== Uitenhage ===
General election 1915: Uitenhage
Party	Candidate	Votes	%	±%
South African	A. H. Garcia	1,646	60.8	+5.4
National	H. E. S. Fremantle	1,061	39.2	New
Majority		585	21.6	N/A
Turnout		2,707	86.1	N/A
South African hold		Swing	N/A	

=== Victoria West ===
General election 1915: Victoria West
Party	Candidate	Votes	%	±%
South African	A. G. Visser	1,247	52.9	+5.4
National	J. N. Louw	1,110	47.1	New
Majority		137	5.8	N/A
Turnout		2,357	75.4	N/A
South African hold		Swing	N/A	

=== Wodehouse ===
General election 1915: Wodehouse
Party	Candidate	Votes	%	±%
National	O. S. Vermooten	1,292	50.9	New
South African	J. A. Venter	1,247	49.1	N/A
Majority		45	1.8	N/A
Turnout		2,539	87.3	N/A
National gain from South African		Swing	N/A	

=== Woodstock ===
General election 1915: Woodstock
Party	Candidate	Votes	%	±%
Unionist	John Hewat	1,119	35.3	−15.3
South African	Isaac Purcell	903	28.5	New
Labour	W. Freestone	587	18.5	−30.9
Independent	J. W. Mushet	486	15.3	New
Unionist	W. D. Hare	75	2.4	New
Majority		216	6.8	N/A
Turnout		3,170	60.4	N/A
Unionist hold		Swing	N/A	

=== Worcester ===
General election 1915: Worcester
Party	Candidate	Votes	%	±%
South African	C. B. Heatlie	1,872	66.7	+5.4
National	J. N. Louw	934	33.3	New
Majority		938	33.4	N/A
Turnout		2,806	86.4	N/A
South African hold		Swing	N/A	

== Natal ==
Party	Votes	%	Seats
South African Party	7,574	40.68	11
Labour Party	4,461	23.96	1
Unionist Party	3,668	19.70	4
National Party	1,274	6.84	0
Independents	1,640	8.81	1
Total	18,617	100.00	17
Source: Schoeman

Unopposed candidates: Unionists 2, SAP 1.

=== Dundee ===
General election 1915: Dundee
Party	Candidate	Votes	%	±%
South African	Thomas Watt	823	64.6	+2.7
Labour	R. J. Hall	285	22.4	New
Independent	J. Dyson	166	13.0	New
Majority		538	42.2	N/A
Turnout		1,274	65.0	N/A
South African hold		Swing	N/A	

=== Durban Berea ===
General election 1915: Durban Berea
Party	Candidate	Votes	%	±%
Unionist	James Henderson	Unopposed		
Unionist hold				

=== Durban Central ===
General election 1915: Durban Central
Party	Candidate	Votes	%	±%
Unionist	Charlie Henwood	966	60.9	+10.1
Labour	Morris Kentridge	620	39.1	+21.6
Majority		346	21.8	N/A
Turnout		1,586	69.4	N/A
Unionist hold		Swing	-5.7	

=== Durban Greyville ===
General election 1915: Durban Greyville
Party	Candidate	Votes	%	±%
Labour	Tommy Boydell	951	53.1	+17.1
Unionist	Walter Greenacre	839	46.9	New
Majority		112	6.2	N/A
Turnout		1,790	75.4	N/A
Labour hold		Swing	N/A	

=== Durban Point ===
General election 1915: Durban Point
Party	Candidate	Votes	%	±%
Independent	P. A. Silburn	1,059	67.8	−6.1
Labour	H. Humphrey	498	31.9	+5.8
Independent	J. E. Palmer	5	0.3	New
Majority		561	35.9	−11.9
Turnout		1,562	72.1	N/A
Independent gain from Unionist		Swing	-5.9	

=== Durban Umbilo ===
General election 1915: Durban Umbilo
Party	Candidate	Votes	%	±%
Unionist	C. P. Robinson	969	62.1	+3.4
Labour	N. P. Palmer	592	37.9	−3.4
Majority		377	24.2	+6.8
Turnout		1,561	68.3	N/A
Unionist hold		Swing	+3.4	

=== Durban Umlazi ===
General election 1915: Durban Umlazi
Party	Candidate	Votes	%	±%
South African	Alfred Fawcus	849	77.2	+42.4
Labour	T. McCrystal	219	19.9	−11.6
Independent	D. St. J. Stephens	32	2.9	New
Majority		630	57.3	+54.0
Turnout		1,100	62.4	N/A
South African hold		Swing	+27.0	

=== Klip River ===
General election 1915: Klip River
Party	Candidate	Votes	%	±%
South African	Henry Wiltshire	912	76.8	+26.6
National	L. W. Meyer	276	23.2	New
Majority		636	53.6	N/A
Turnout		1,188	64.1	N/A
South African hold		Swing	N/A	

=== Newcastle ===
General election 1915: Newcastle
Party	Candidate	Votes	%	±%
South African	T. J. Nel	473	39.2	−13.8
Unionist	R. H. Struben	395	32.8	New
National	A. T. Spies	338	28.0	New
Majority		78	6.4	N/A
Turnout		1,206	65.7	N/A
South African hold		Swing	N/A	

=== Pietermaritzburg North ===
General election 1915: Pietermaritzburg North
Party	Candidate	Votes	%	±%
South African	Thomas Orr	880	69.8	+9.6
Labour	F. G. E. Tilbury	379	30.2	−9.6
Majority		295	39.6	+19.2
Turnout		1,259	63.6	N/A
South African hold		Swing	+9.6	

=== Pietermaritzburg South ===
General election 1915: Pietermaritzburg South
Party	Candidate	Votes	%	±%
South African	R. A. Buntine	868	67.2	New
Labour	W. H. Griffin	424	32.8	−5.4
Majority		444	34.4	N/A
Turnout		1,292	67.6	N/A
South African gain from Labour		Swing	N/A	

=== Umvoti ===
General election 1915: Umvoti
Party	Candidate	Votes	%	±%
South African	George Leuchars	636	42.2	−20.9
National	Ernest George Jansen	493	32.7	New
Independent	W. A. Deane	378	25.1	−11.8
Majority		143	9.5	N/A
Turnout		1,507	79.2	N/A
South African hold		Swing	N/A	

=== Umzimkulu ===
General election 1915: Umzimkulu
Party	Candidate	Votes	%	±%
South African	Frank Reynolds	Unopposed		
South African hold				

=== Victoria County ===
General election 1915: Victoria County
Party	Candidate	Votes	%	±%
Unionist	J. G. Hunter	Unopposed		
Unionist hold				

=== Vryheid ===
General election 1915: Vryheid
Party	Candidate	Votes	%	±%
South African	M. W. Myburgh	606	60.8	New
National	F. W. van Raenen	390	39.2	New
Majority		216	21.6	N/A
Turnout		996	58.5	N/A
South African hold		Swing	N/A	

=== Weenen ===
General election 1915: Weenen
Party	Candidate	Votes	%	±%
South African	J. W. Moor	536	51.8	+4.2
Unionist	G. R. Richards	499	48.2	−4.2
Majority		37	3.6	N/A
Turnout		1,035	66.7	N/A
South African gain from Unionist		Swing	+4.2	

=== Zululand ===
General election 1915: Zululand
Party	Candidate	Votes	%	±%
South African	W. F. Clayton	991	78.6	+22.3
National	E. E. Dalton	270	21.4	New
Majority		721	57.2	N/A
Turnout		1,261	59.2	N/A
South African hold		Swing	N/A	

== Orange Free State ==
Party	Votes	%	Seats
National Party	16,597	63.52	16
South African Party	9,530	36.48	0
Unionist Party			1
Total	26,127	100.00	17
Source: Schoeman

Unopposed candidates: Unionist 1, National 1.

=== Bethlehem ===
General election 1915: Bethlehem
Party	Candidate	Votes	%	±%
National	J. H. B. Wessels	1,307	66.6	New
South African	J. J. Booysen	655	33.4	N/A
Majority		652	33.2	N/A
Turnout		1,962	72.9	N/A
National gain from South African		Swing	N/A	

=== Bloemfontein ===
General election 1915: Bloemfontein
Party	Candidate	Votes	%	±%
Unionist	H. F. Blaine	Unopposed		
Unionist hold				

=== Bloemfontein District ===
General election 1915: Bloemfontein District
Party	Candidate	Votes	%	±%
National	J. W. G. Steyn	1,095	66.7	New
South African	J. P. S. Steyl	546	33.3	−18.7
Majority		549	33.4	N/A
Turnout		1,641	77.3	N/A
National gain from South African		Swing	N/A	

=== Boshof ===
General election 1915: Boshof
Party	Candidate	Votes	%	±%
National	C. A. van Niekerk	Unopposed		
National hold				

=== Edenburg ===
General election 1915: Edenburg
Party	Candidate	Votes	%	±%
National	E. W. Fichardt	1,096	65.1	New
South African	F. E. T. Krause	587	34.9	N/A
Majority		509	30.2	N/A
Turnout		1,683	77.1	N/A
National gain from South African		Swing	N/A	

=== Fauresmith ===
General election 1915: Fauresmith
Party	Candidate	Votes	%	±%
National	Nicolaas Havenga	793	52.4	New
South African	S. J. van der Merwe	721	47.6	N/A
Majority		72	4.8	N/A
Turnout		1,514	66.0	N/A
National gain from South African		Swing	N/A	

=== Ficksburg ===
General election 1915: Ficksburg
Party	Candidate	Votes	%	±%
National	J. G. Keyter	1,220	67.9	−3.5
South African	C. F. R. von Maltitz	576	32.1	N/A
Majority		644	35.8	N/A
Turnout		1,796	69.7	N/A
National hold		Swing	N/A	

=== Frankfort ===
General election 1915: Frankfort
Party	Candidate	Votes	%	±%
National	J. B. Wessels	1,209	61.3	New
South African	H. N. W. Botha	763	38.7	N/A
Majority		446	22.6	N/A
Turnout		1,972	73.1	N/A
National gain from South African		Swing	N/A	

=== Harrismith ===
General election 1915: Harrismith
Party	Candidate	Votes	%	±%
National	Z. J. de Beer	999	54.6	New
South African	L. P. H. Botha	832	45.4	N/A
Majority		167	9.2	N/A
Turnout		1,831	77.5	N/A
National gain from South African		Swing	N/A	

=== Heilbron ===
General election 1915: Heilbron
Party	Candidate	Votes	%	±%
National	M. L. Malan	1,129	63.1	New
South African	Deneys Reitz	659	36.9	−34.7
Majority		570	26.2	N/A
Turnout		1,788	76.4	N/A
National gain from South African		Swing	N/A	

=== Hoopstad ===
General election 1915: Hoopstad
Party	Candidate	Votes	%	±%
National	F. J. Rheeders	1,069	62.8	New
South African	Hendrik Schalk Theron	633	37.2	N/A
Majority		436	25.6	N/A
Turnout		1,702	73.6	N/A
National gain from South African		Swing	N/A	

=== Kroonstad ===
General election 1915: Kroonstad
Party	Candidate	Votes	%	±%
National	H. P. Serfontein	942	53.2	New
South African	N. J. de Wet	828	46.8	−12.5
Majority		114	6.4	N/A
Turnout		1,770	76.2	N/A
National gain from South African		Swing	N/A	

=== Ladybrand ===
General election 1915: Ladybrand
Party	Candidate	Votes	%	±%
National	C. G. Fichardt	945	62.6	N/A
South African	P. J. F. Krog	565	37.4	New
Majority		380	25.2	N/A
Turnout		1,510	64.3	N/A
National hold		Swing	N/A	

=== Rouxville ===
General election 1915: Rouxville
Party	Candidate	Votes	%	±%
National	Daniël Hugo	1,190	72.6	New
South African	H. F. D. Papenfus	449	27.4	N/A
Majority		741	45.2	N/A
Turnout		1,639	70.1	N/A
National gain from South African		Swing	N/A	

=== Smithfield ===
General election 1915: Smithfield
Party	Candidate	Votes	%	±%
National	J. B. M. Hertzog	1,315	82.8	N/A
South African	G. C. Botha	272	17.2	New
Majority		1,043	65.6	N/A
Turnout		1,587	74.9	N/A
National hold		Swing	N/A	

=== Vredefort ===
General election 1915: Vredefort
Party	Candidate	Votes	%	±%
National	Colin Fraser Steyn	1,133	60.2	New
South African	J. A. P. van der Merwe	749	39.8	N/A
Majority		384	20.4	N/A
Turnout		1,882	73.1	N/A
National gain from South African		Swing	N/A	

=== Winburg ===
General election 1915: Winburg
Party	Candidate	Votes	%	±%
National	C. T. M. Wilcocks	1,155	62.4	New
South African	F. R. Cronjé	695	37.6	N/A
Majority		460	24.8	N/A
Turnout		1,850	77.4	N/A
National gain from South African		Swing	N/A	

== Transvaal ==
Party	Votes	%	Seats
South African Party	30,159	33.46	22
National Party	25,049	27.79	4
Unionist Party	17,815	19.77	15
Labour Party	13,881	15.40	2
Independent Labour Party	802	0.89	0
Independents	2,424	2.69	2
Total	90,130	100.00	45
Source: Schoeman

Unopposed candidates: SAP 1.

=== Barberton ===
General election 1915: Barberton
Party	Candidate	Votes	%	±%
South African	J. H. Grobler	1,124	68.3	+6.3
National	J. L. Malan	522	31.7	New
Majority		602	36.6	N/A
Turnout		1,646	68.3	N/A
South African hold		Swing	N/A	

=== Benoni ===
General election 1915: Benoni
Party	Candidate	Votes	%	±%
Labour	Walter Madeley	1,427	54.6	New
South African	G. M. Botha	648	24.8	New
National	G. van N. Schonken	539	20.6	New
Majority		779	29.8	N/A
Turnout		2,614	77.3	N/A
Labour win (new seat)				

=== Bethal ===
General election 1915: Bethal
Party	Candidate	Votes	%	±%
South African	H. S. Grobler	1,360	59.7	New
National	J. J. Scheepers	917	40.3	New
Majority		443	19.4	N/A
Turnout		2,277	76.2	N/A
South African win (new seat)				

=== Bezuidenhout ===
General election 1915: Bezuidenhout
Party	Candidate	Votes	%	±%
Unionist	Leslie Blackwell	1,165	44.7	New
Labour	Frederic Creswell	1,152	44.2	New
National	J. H. L. Schuman	289	11.1	New
Majority		13	0.5	N/A
Turnout		2,606	78.1	N/A
Unionist win (new seat)				

=== Boksburg ===
General election 1915: Boksburg
Party	Candidate	Votes	%	±%
Unionist	J. C. MacNeillie	959	61.1	−0.9
Labour	A. Ruffels	611	38.9	New
Majority		348	22.2	N/A
Turnout		1,570	76.4	N/A
Unionist hold		Swing	N/A	

=== Commissioner Street ===
General election 1915: Commissioner Street
Party	Candidate	Votes	%	±%
South African	Harry Graumann	1,031	65.4	New
Labour	C. W. Hayward	546	34.6	−15.8
Majority		485	30.8	N/A
Turnout		1,577	67.0	N/A
South African gain from Labour		Swing	N/A	

=== Denver ===
General election 1915: Denver
Party	Candidate	Votes	%	±%
Unionist	W. J. Parrack	789	47.3	−9.8
Labour	J. J. Mulvey	538	32.2	−10.7
National	G. A. Hattingh	341	20.4	New
Majority		251	15.1	+0.9
Turnout		1,668	75.9	N/A
Unionist hold		Swing	+0.5	

=== Ermelo ===
General election 1915: Ermelo
Party	Candidate	Votes	%	±%
South African	Tobias Smuts	1,295	65.1	N/A
National	W. P. Steenkamp	695	34.9	New
Majority		600	30.2	N/A
Turnout		1,990	81.4	N/A
South African hold		Swing	N/A	

=== Fordsburg ===
General election 1915: Fordsburg
Party	Candidate	Votes	%	±%
Unionist	Patrick Duncan	724	45.9	+10.4
Labour	D. Dingwell	465	29.4	−1.9
National	J. S. F. Pretorius	390	24.7	New
Majority		259	16.5	N/A
Turnout		1,579	71.4	N/A
Unionist hold		Swing	N/A	

=== Georgetown ===
General election 1915: Georgetown
Party	Candidate	Votes	%	±%
Unionist	Hugh McAlister	900	44.4	−10.7
National	W. Olivier	577	28.4	New
Labour	G. Brown	489	24.1	+4.8
Independent	W. H. Andrews	63	3.1	New
Majority		323	16.0	N/A
Turnout		2,029	77.5	N/A
Unionist hold		Swing	N/A	

=== Germiston ===
General election 1915: Germiston
Party	Candidate	Votes	%	±%
Unionist	D. F. Drew	905	55.7	−2.0
Labour	P. F. Smith	719	44.3	+2.0
Majority		186	11.4	−4.0
Turnout		1,624	69.0	N/A
Unionist hold		Swing	-2.0	

=== Heidelberg ===
General election 1915: Heidelberg
Party	Candidate	Votes	%	±%
South African	W. W. J. J. Bezuidenhout	1,459	67.3	+5.5
National	J. H. Gey van Pittius	709	32.7	New
Majority		750	34.6	N/A
Turnout		2,168	72.1	N/A
South African hold		Swing	N/A	

=== Hospital ===
General election 1915: Hospital
Party	Candidate	Votes	%	±%
Unionist	H. B. Papenfus	1,294	66.5	New
Labour	G. Hills	344	17.7	New
National	S. J. Minnaar	308	15.8	New
Majority		950	48.8	N/A
Turnout		1,946	75.3	N/A
Unionist win (new seat)				

=== Klerksdorp ===
General election 1915: Klerksdorp
Party	Candidate	Votes	%	±%
South African	J. A. Nesser	1,247	54.1	+5.5
National	J. S. Smit	1,059	45.9	New
Majority		188	8.2	N/A
Turnout		2,306	82.6	N/A
South African win (new seat)				

=== Krugersdorp ===
General election 1915: Krugersdorp
Party	Candidate	Votes	%	±%
Independent	Abe Bailey	1,153	57.2	+9.6
National	H. J. Poutsma	523	26.0	New
Labour	E. Creswell	339	16.8	New
Majority		630	31.2	N/A
Turnout		2,015	76.4	N/A
Independent gain from South African		Swing	N/A	

=== Langlaagte ===
General election 1915: Langlaagte
Party	Candidate	Votes	%	±%
Unionist	Willie Rockey	794	47.0	−9.8
National	D. S. H. Pollock	560	33.1	New
Labour	C. S. Raath	260	15.4	−27.8
Independent	J. A. Clark	77	4.6	New
Majority		234	13.9	N/A
Turnout		1,691	73.5	N/A
Unionist hold		Swing		

=== Lichtenburg ===
General election 1915: Lichtenburg
Party	Candidate	Votes	%	±%
National	Tielman Roos	1,449	60.7	New
South African	E. H. Matthews	939	39.3	N/A
Majority		510	21.4	N/A
Turnout		2,388	77.2	N/A
National gain from South African		Swing	N/A	

=== Losberg ===
General election 1915: Losberg
Party	Candidate	Votes	%	±%
South African	Louis Botha	1,451	65.0	N/A
National	A. S. van Hees	780	35.0	New
Majority		671	30.0	N/A
Turnout		2,231	82.8	N/A
South African hold		Swing	N/A	

=== Lydenburg ===
General election 1915: Lydenburg
Party	Candidate	Votes	%	±%
South African	J. L. Shurink	1,384	68.0	N/A
National	S. Hiemstra	651	32.0	New
Majority		723	36.0	N/A
Turnout		2,035	71.4	N/A
South African hold		Swing	N/A	

=== Maraisburg ===
General election 1915: Maraisburg
Party	Candidate	Votes	%	±%
South African	Willem van Hulsteyn	862	44.4	New
National	J. Francken	562	29.0	New
Labour	N. Toomey	516	26.6	New
Majority		300	15.4	N/A
Turnout		1,940	71.6	N/A
South African win (new seat)				

=== Marico ===
General election 1915: Marico
Party	Candidate	Votes	%	±%
South African	L. A. S. Lemmer	1,194	63.1	−20.0
National	G. I. M. Wolmarans	698	36.9	New
Majority		496	26.2	N/A
Turnout		1,892	74.5	N/A
South African hold		Swing	N/A	

=== Middelburg ===
General election 1915: Middelburg
Party	Candidate	Votes	%	±%
South African	J. L. Hamman	1,351	56.1	N/A
National	N. H. van der Walt	1,057	43.9	New
Majority		294	12.2	N/A
Turnout		2,408	76.6	N/A
South African hold		Swing	N/A	

=== Ophirton ===
General election 1915: Ophirton
Party	Candidate	Votes	%	±%
Unionist	Robert Raine	880	57.0	New
Labour	J. Hindman	534	34.6	New
National	J. L. P. Erasmus	131	8.5	New
Majority		346	22.4	N/A
Turnout		1,545	70.6	N/A
Unionist win (new seat)				

=== Parktown ===
General election 1915: Parktown
Party	Candidate	Votes	%	±%
Unionist	Richard Feetham	2,001	80.3	New
National	Oswald Pirow	299	12.0	New
Labour	A. W. Barlow	192	7.7	New
Majority		1,702	68.3	N/A
Turnout		2,492	74.4	N/A
Unionist win (new seat)				

=== Potchefstroom ===
General election 1915: Potchefstroom
Party	Candidate	Votes	%	±%
South African	G. W. Holl	1,043	56.8	−16.5
National	W. J. de Klerk	794	43.2	New
Majority		249	13.6	N/A
Turnout		1,837	82.5	N/A
South African hold		Swing	N/A	

=== Pretoria Central ===
General election 1915: Pretoria Central
Party	Candidate	Votes	%	±%
Unionist	Edward Rooth	1,182	61.7	New
National	L. E. Brandt	416	21.7	New
Labour	M. G. Nicholson	318	16.6	New
Majority		766	40.0	N/A
Turnout		1,916	77.4	N/A
Unionist win (new seat)				

=== Pretoria District North ===
General election 1915: Pretoria District North
Party	Candidate	Votes	%	±%
National	J. A. Joubert	826	50.8	New
South African	Thomas Cullinan	800	49.2	−11.9
Majority		26	1.6	N/A
Turnout		1,626	77.1	N/A
National gain from South African		Swing	N/A	

=== Pretoria District South ===
General election 1915: Pretoria District South
Party	Candidate	Votes	%	±%
South African	Jacobus van der Walt	1,104	48.5	N/A
National	H. S. Webb	1,034	45.4	New
Labour	W. P. Thorn	140	6.1	New
Majority		70	3.1	N/A
Turnout		2,278	80.6	N/A
South African hold		Swing	N/A	

=== Pretoria East ===
General election 1915: Pretoria East
Party	Candidate	Votes	%	±%
Unionist	J. P. Fitzpatrick	1,495	61.3	+9.3
National	K. Rood	644	26.4	New
Labour	A. Grant	292	12.0	New
Independent	R. J. Smith	6	0.2	New
Majority		851	34.9	N/A
Turnout		2,437	76.7	N/A
Unionist hold		Swing	N/A	

=== Pretoria West ===
General election 1915: Pretoria West
Party	Candidate	Votes	%	±%
South African	Jan Smuts	1,102	50.0	−1.4
National	Hjalmar Reitz	808	36.7	New
Labour	G. H. McLean	293	13.3	+1.6
Majority		294	13.3	N/A
Turnout		2,203	80.8	N/A
South African hold		Swing	N/A	

=== Randfontein ===
General election 1915: Randfontein
Party	Candidate	Votes	%	±%
Independent	Sir Joseph Robinson, Bt.	1,100	64.6	New
Labour	J. Hoatson	410	24.1	New
National	W. M. Edwards	169	9.9	New
Independent	J. W. P. Tully	25	1.5	New
Majority		690	40.5	N/A
Turnout		1,704	74.3	N/A
Independent win (new seat)				

=== Rustenburg ===
General election 1915: Rustenburg
Party	Candidate	Votes	%	±%
South African	B. I. J. van Heerden	1,353	61.9	−16.5
National	T. C. Stoffberg	834	38.1	New
Majority		519	23.8	N/A
Turnout		2,187	79.1	N/A
South African hold		Swing	N/A	

=== Siemert ===
General election 1915: Siemert
Party	Candidate	Votes	%	±%
Labour	Harry Sampson	909	60.5	+8.1
Unionist	A. E. Cowley	593	39.5	New
Majority		851	21.0	N/A
Turnout		1,502	71.0	N/A
Labour hold		Swing	N/A	

=== Soutpansberg ===
General election 1915: Soutpansberg
Party	Candidate	Votes	%	±%
South African	Hendrik Mentz	1,188	54.6	N/A
National	F. W. Beyers	987	45.4	New
Majority		201	9.2	N/A
Turnout		2,175	78.2	N/A
South African hold		Swing	N/A	

=== Springs ===
General election 1915: Springs
Party	Candidate	Votes	%	±%
Unionist	George Rennie	987	48.3	+0.5
Labour	D. M. Kendall	809	39.6	−12.6
National	J. H. Munnik	249	12.2	New
Majority		178	8.7	N/A
Turnout		2,045	68.6	N/A
Unionist win (new seat)				

=== Standerton ===
General election 1915: Standerton
Party	Candidate	Votes	%	±%
South African	G. M. Claassen	Unopposed		
South African hold				

=== Troyeville ===
General election 1915: Troyeville
Party	Candidate	Votes	%	±%
Unionist	J. W. Quinn	1,119	58.3	−1.6
Independent Labour	Arthur Barlow	802	41.7	New
Majority		317	16.6	N/A
Turnout		1,921	78.1	N/A
Unionist hold		Swing	N/A	

=== Turffontein ===
General election 1915: Turffontein
Party	Candidate	Votes	%	±%
Unionist	H. A. Wyndham	1,374	54.3	+0.6
Labour	G. B. Steer	807	31.9	New
National	S. W. van Niekerk	348	13.8	New
Majority		567	22.4	N/A
Turnout		2,529	76.6	N/A
Unionist hold		Swing	N/A	

=== Von Brandis ===
General election 1915: Von Brandis
Party	Candidate	Votes	%	±%
Unionist	Emile Nathan	1,179	65.9	+1.3
Labour	W. J. McIntyre	611	34.1	New
Majority		568	31.8	N/A
Turnout		1,790	70.8	N/A
Unionist hold		Swing	N/A	

=== Vrededorp ===
General election 1915: Vrededorp
Party	Candidate	Votes	%	±%
South African	Lourens Geldenhuys	1,028	42.9	−15.7
National	T. C. Visser	968	40.4	New
Labour	C. A. Lagesen	398	16.6	New
Majority		60	1.5	N/A
Turnout		2,394	80.7	N/A
South African hold		Swing	N/A	

=== Wakkerstroom ===
General election 1915: Wakkerstroom
Party	Candidate	Votes	%	±%
South African	G. A. Kolbe	1,311	64.0	N/A
National	A. Kuit	739	36.0	New
Majority		572	28.0	N/A
Turnout		2,050	78.1	N/A
South African hold		Swing	N/A	

=== Waterberg ===
General election 1915: Waterberg
Party	Candidate	Votes	%	±%
National	P. W. le Roux van Niekerk	997	50.1	New
South African	R. G. Nicholson	994	49.9	N/A
Majority		3	0.2	N/A
Turnout		1,991	78.5	N/A
National gain from South African		Swing	N/A	

=== Witwatersberg ===
General election 1915: Witwatersberg
Party	Candidate	Votes	%	±%
South African	N. J. Pretorius	1,176	53.0	N/A
National	F. G. A. Wolmarans	1,041	47.0	New
Majority		135	6.0	N/A
Turnout		2,217	78.5	N/A
South African win (new seat)				

=== Wolmaransstad ===
General election 1915: Wolmaransstad
Party	Candidate	Votes	%	±%
National	E. J. J. van der Horst	1,439	53.7	New
South African	J. P. Jooste	1,239	46.3	N/A
Majority		200	7.4	N/A
Turnout		2,678	71.2	N/A
National gain from South African		Swing	N/A	

=== Yeoville ===
General election 1915: Yeoville
Party	Candidate	Votes	%	±%
Unionist	W. T. F. Davies	1,951	80.9	New
Labour	R. G. Barlow	462	19.1	New
Majority		1,489	61.8	N/A
Turnout		2,413	76.6	N/A
Unionist hold		Swing	N/A	
