= Commissioner Street (House of Assembly of South Africa constituency) =

- Commissionerstraat
- Former constituency for the South African House of Assembly
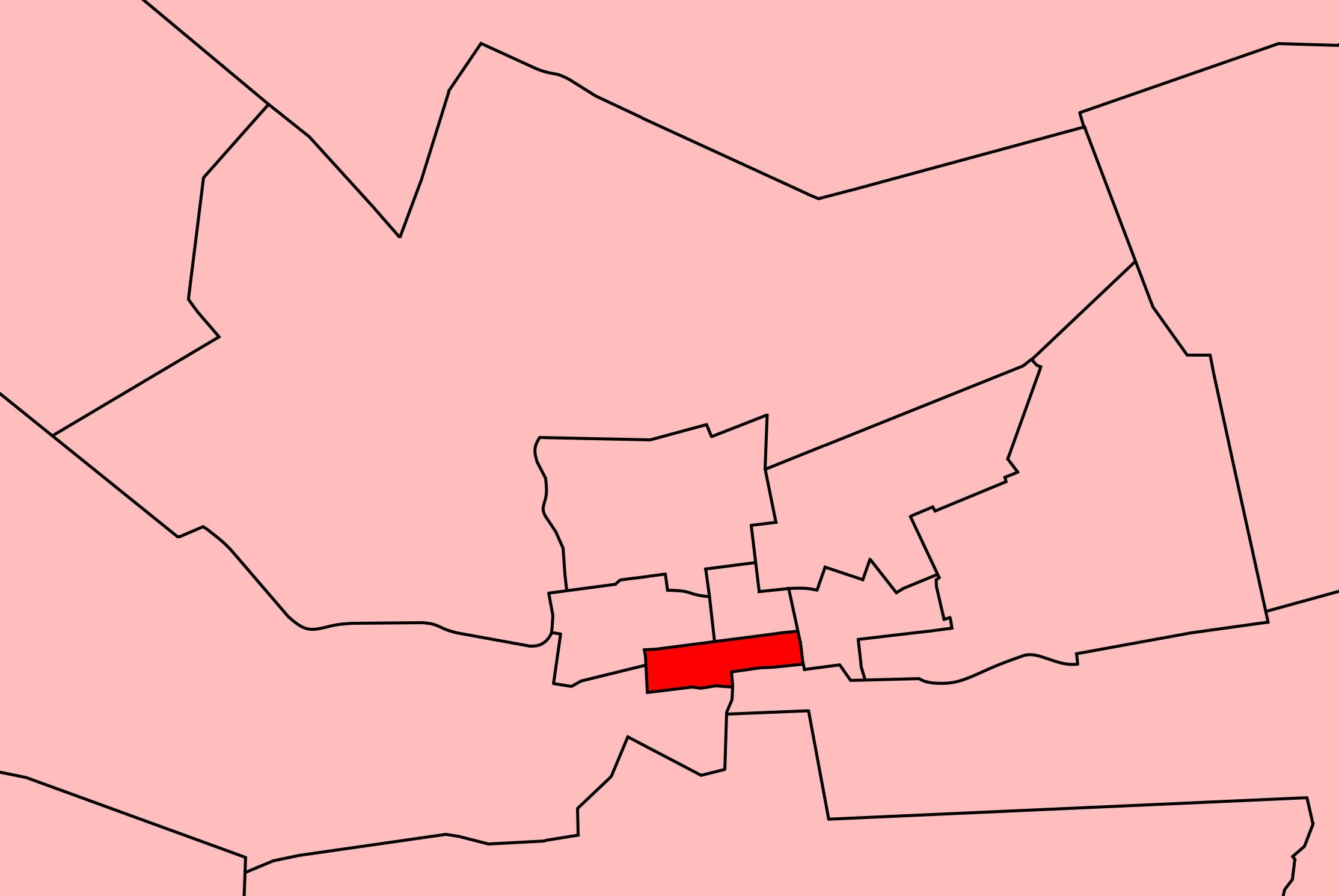
- Location of Commissioner Street within Johannesburg (1910)
- Province: Transvaal
- Electorate: 3,123 (1921)

Former constituency
- Created: 1910
- Abolished: 1924
- Number of members: 1
- Last MHA: Harry Graumann (SAP)

Commissioner Street (Afrikaans: Commissionerstraat) was a constituency in the Transvaal Province of South Africa, which existed from 1910 to 1924. Named after Commissioner Street, one of the main thoroughfares of the Johannesburg CBD, it covered the southern and southwestern parts of the CBD. Throughout its existence it elected one member to the House of Assembly and one to the Transvaal Provincial Council.

== Franchise notes ==
When the Union of South Africa was formed in 1910, the electoral qualifications in use in each pre-existing colony were kept in place. In the Transvaal Colony, and its predecessor the South African Republic, the vote was restricted to white men, and as such, elections in the Transvaal Province were held on a whites-only franchise from the beginning. The franchise was also restricted by property and education qualifications until the 1933 general election, following the passage of the Women's Enfranchisement Act, 1930 and the Franchise Laws Amendment Act, 1931. From then on, the franchise was given to all white citizens aged 21 or over. Non-whites remained disenfranchised until the end of apartheid and the introduction of universal suffrage in 1994.

== History ==
Commissioner Street was a largely working-class seat, and was closely fought between the Labour Party and various non-socialist candidates, changing hands at every election during its existence. Its first representative was Harry Sampson, a trade union organiser and leading figure of the Transvaal Independent Labour Party, who won the seat by a narrow margin over the Unionist candidate. In 1915, Sampson moved to the new constituency of Siemert, and Labour’s new candidate C. H. Hayward lost the seat to the South African Party candidate Harry Graumann.

In 1920, the seat was redrawn to include a large part of the abolished Ophirton constituency, greatly increasing its surface area and bringing in a number of additional voters. On these boundaries, Labour candidate John Henry Scott Gow gained the seat back in 1920, as part of a nationwide wave of success for the party. However, he would lose it once again in 1921 to Graumann, who served as the seat’s MP until its abolition in 1924.

== Members ==
Election	Member	Party
1910	Harry Sampson	Labour
1915	Harry Graumann	SAP
1920	J. H. S. Gow	Labour
1921	Harry Graumann	SAP
1924	Constituency abolished	

== Detailed results ==
=== Elections in the 1910s ===
General election 1910: Commissioner Street
Party	Candidate	Votes	%	±%
Labour	Harry Sampson	924	50.4	New
Unionist	R. Curry	884	48.3	New
Socialist	J. Davidson	25	1.4	New
Majority		80	2.1	N/A
Labour win (new seat)				

General election 1915: Commissioner Street
Party	Candidate	Votes	%	±%
South African	Harry Graumann	1,031	65.4	New
Labour	C. W. Hayward	546	34.6	−15.8
Majority		485	30.8	N/A
Turnout		1,577	67.0	N/A
South African gain from Labour		Swing	N/A	

=== Elections in the 1920s ===
General election 1920: Commissioner Street
Party	Candidate	Votes	%	±%
Labour	J. H. S. Gow	838	49.7	+15.1
South African	W. J. Laite	791	46.9	−18.5
Independent	S. P. Bunting	57	3.4	New
Majority		47	2.8	N/A
Turnout		1,686	55.3	−11.7
Labour gain from South African		Swing	+16.8	

General election 1921: Commissioner Street
Party	Candidate	Votes	%	±%
South African	Harry Graumann	1,181	62.4	+15.5
Labour	J. H. S. Gow	713	37.6	−12.1
Majority		468	24.8	N/A
Turnout		1,894	60.6	+5.3
South African gain from Labour		Swing	+13.8	
