= Koos van der Merwe =

South African politician (1937–2024)

Member of the National Assembly
- In office 1994–2014
- Constituency: National list

Member of the House of Assembly
- In office 1977–1994
- Constituency: Jeppe (1977–1987); Overvaal (1987–1994)

Personal details
- Born: Jacobus Hercules van der Merwe; 4 August 1937 Koppies, Orange Free State, Union of South Africa
- Died: 22 September 2024 (aged 87) Pretoria, South Africa
- Party: Inkatha Freedom Party (from 1993)
- Other political affiliations: National Party (until 1982); Conservative Party (1982–1992)
- Education: University of Pretoria; University of South Africa
- Profession: Lawyer

Jacobus Hercules "Koos" van der Merwe (4 August 1937 – 22 September 2024) was a South African politician. He was a member of the South African Parliament, representing the National Party, Conservative Party and the Inkatha Freedom Party (IFP). He was a member of the House of Assembly and later the South African National Assembly between 1977 and 2014, being the longest serving member of Parliament at the time of his retirement.

== Early life and education ==
Van der Merwe was born on 4 August 1937 in Koppies, Orange Free State. He studied at the University of Pretoria before working as an insurer. He then earned a diploma in law from the University of South Africa and later qualified as a lawyer.

== Political career ==
Van der Merwe first got involved in politics as a child by helping put up posters for the National Party at the 1948 South African general election. He was elected as a member of Parliament for Jeppe representing the National Party in 1977. He gained a reputation as a political maverick, reportedly once driving up to a tollgate and shooting it in protest of their imposition. In 1982, he was part of the split of the National Party by founding the Conservative Party after storming out of a meeting stating: "I'm finished with that bloody progressive P. W. Botha". He then moved constituency and was elected as a Conservative in Overvaal.

When the State President F. W. de Klerk announced the end of apartheid in 1990, van der Merwe threatened that the Conservative Party would work to mobilise Afrikaners against the government and led a strike in Pretoria. He also addressed Nelson Mandela directly, calling on him to renounce African National Congress violence and recognise the rights of Afrikaner self-determination. Mandela would respond in Afrikaans that he was looking forward to discussing it with van der Merwe. However, in 1992 van der Merwe was expelled from the Conservative Party for "ignoring party discipline" in calling for negotiations with the African National Congress for a smaller Volkstaat.

He spent the next 18 months as an independent politician, ironically saying he represented the "Desert Party" and intended to retire at the next election. In 1993, he joined the Inkatha Freedom Party (IFP) on the grounds he shared their federalist viewpoints. He was persuaded to stand at the 1994 South African general election and was re-elected and became the IFP's Chief Whip, a position he held until retirement. In 2006, he was ejected from the chamber for waving a cake at a government minister while demanding a meeting with President Thabo Mbeki, saying "Here is your cake, come and eat it! I have been waiting for a year." The cake was left in the chamber where it was consumed by members from the Democratic Alliance. He served in the National Assembly until retiring before the 2014 South African general election, where he had been the longest serving MP. Despite retiring, he still gave political opinions to newspapers.

== Personal life and death ==
In the early 1990s, van der Merwe lived in Johannesburg. He died at the Die Wilgers hospital in Pretoria, on 22 September 2024, at the age of 87.

Political offices
Preceded by	Member of the House of Assembly; Member of the National Assembly of South Africa; 1977–2014	Succeeded by
