= Hospital (House of Assembly of South Africa constituency) =

- Hospitaal
- Former constituency for the South African House of Assembly
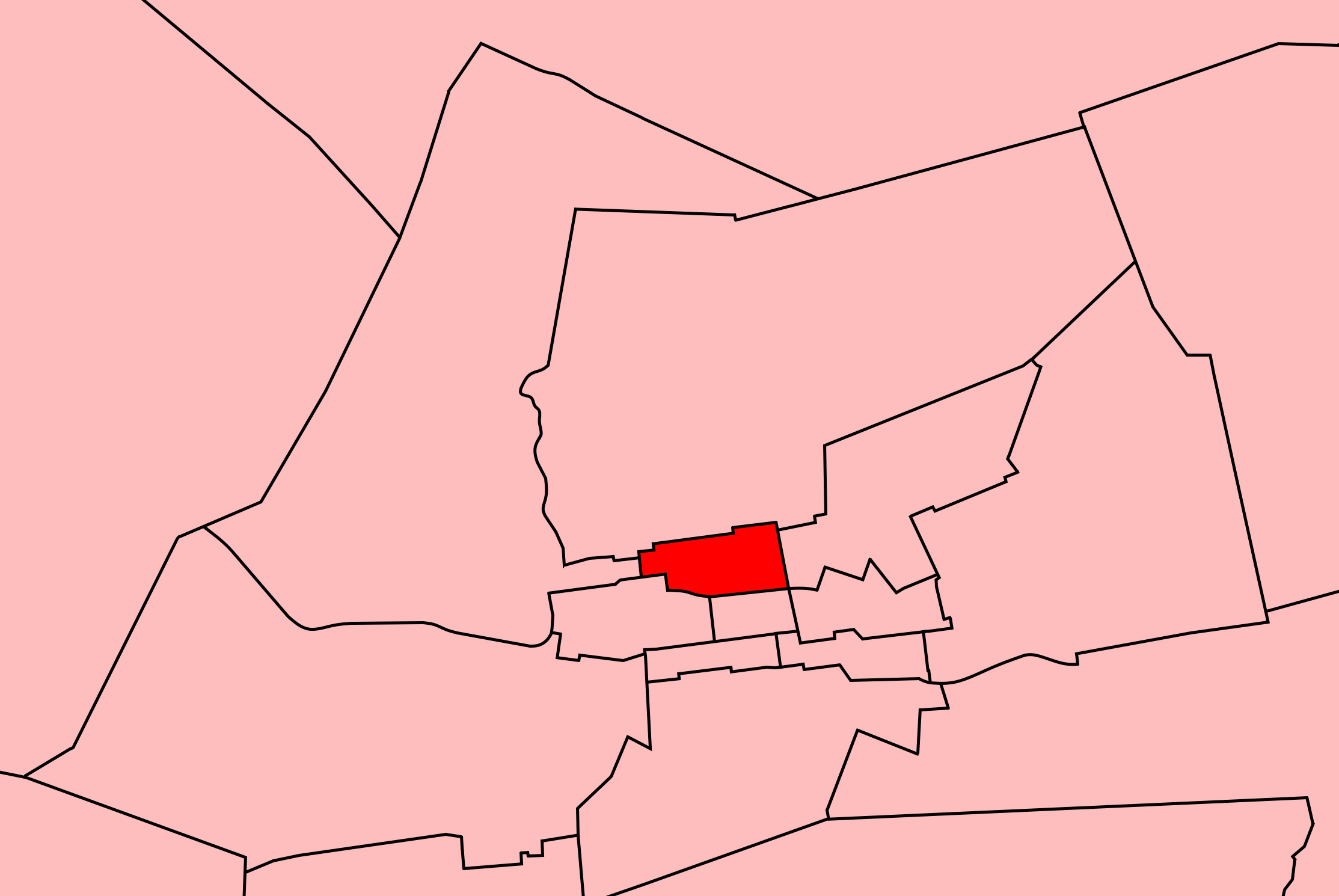
- Location of Hospital within Johannesburg (1915)
- Province: Transvaal
- Electorate: 10,877 (1961)

Former constituency
- Created: 1915
- Abolished: 1966
- Number of members: 1
- Last MHA: Alec Gorshel (UP)
- Created from: Braamfontein

Hospital (Afrikaans: Hospitaal) was a constituency in the Transvaal Province of South Africa, which existed from 1915 to 1966. It covered parts of the inner northern suburbs of Johannesburg surrounding the Johannesburg Hospital complex and the University of the Witwatersrand. Throughout its existence it elected one member to the House of Assembly and one to the Transvaal Provincial Council.

== Franchise notes ==
When the Union of South Africa was formed in 1910, the electoral qualifications in use in each pre-existing colony were kept in place. In the Transvaal Colony, and its predecessor the South African Republic, the vote was restricted to white men, and as such, elections in the Transvaal Province were held on a whites-only franchise from the beginning. The franchise was also restricted by property and education qualifications until the 1933 general election, following the passage of the Women's Enfranchisement Act, 1930 and the Franchise Laws Amendment Act, 1931. From then on, the franchise was given to all white citizens aged 21 or over. Non-whites remained disenfranchised until the end of apartheid and the introduction of universal suffrage in 1994.

== History ==
Like most of Johannesburg's northern suburbs, Hospital had a largely English-speaking and liberal electorate. It was held throughout its existence by the main pro-British party in South Africa, first the Unionists, then the South African Party and finally the United Party. The one brief exception was the 1953-58 term, during which sitting MP Arthur Barlow was expelled from the United Party for proposing a compromise with the government over the Coloured vote question. He joined the National Conservative Party, a conservative split from the UP, and left parliament at the next election, which was again won handily by the UP candidate.

== Members ==
Election	Member	Party
1915	H. B. Papenfus	Unionist
1920	H. B. Papenfus	Unionist
1921	H. B. Papenfus	SAP
1924	H. B. Papenfus	SAP
1929	Robert Hugh Henderson	SAP
1933	Robert Hugh Henderson	SAP
1934	Robert Hugh Henderson	United
1938	Robert Hugh Henderson	United
1943	Arthur Barlow	United
1948	Arthur Barlow	United
1953	Arthur Barlow	United
1954	Arthur Barlow	NCP
1958	Boris Wilson	United
1961	Alec Gorshel	United
1966	Constituency abolished	

== Detailed results ==
=== Elections in the 1910s ===
General election 1915: Hospital
Party	Candidate	Votes	%	±%
Unionist	H. B. Papenfus	1,294	66.5	New
Labour	G. Hills	344	17.7	New
National	S. J. Minnaar	308	15.8	New
Majority		950	48.8	N/A
Turnout		1,946	75.3	N/A
Unionist win (new seat)				

=== Elections in the 1920s ===
General election 1920: Hospital
Party	Candidate	Votes	%	±%
South African	H. B. Papenfus	734	35.4	−31.1
Labour	John Christie	556	26.8	+9.1
Unionist	J. Weightman	428	20.6	New
National	M. Reiseberg	355	17.1	+1.3
Majority		950	8.6	−40.2
Turnout		2,073	65.6	−9.7
South African hold		Swing	-20.1	

General election 1921: Hospital
Party	Candidate	Votes	%	±%
South African	H. B. Papenfus	1,412	68.5	+33.1
National	R. L. Weir	648	31.5	+14.4
Majority		764	37.0	N/A
Turnout		2,060	62.5	−3.1
South African hold		Swing	N/A	

General election 1924: Hospital
Party	Candidate	Votes	%	±%
South African	H. B. Papenfus	1,100	51.2	−17.3
Labour	C. Walters	1,043	48.5	New
Rejected ballots		7	0.3	N/A
Majority		57	2.7	N/A
Turnout		2,150	73.9	+11.4
South African hold		Swing	N/A	

General election 1929: Hospital
Party	Candidate	Votes	%	±%
South African	Robert Hugh Henderson	1,472	60.4	+9.2
National	B. Alexander	951	39.0	New
Rejected ballots		13	0.6	+0.3
Majority		521	21.4	N/A
Turnout		2,436	75.0	+1.1
South African hold		Swing	N/A	

=== Elections in the 1930s ===
General election 1933: Hospital
Party	Candidate	Votes	%	±%
South African	Robert Hugh Henderson	2,458	63.0	+2.6
Roos	G. A. Friendly	1,384	35.5	New
Rejected ballots		62	1.5	+0.9
Majority		1,074	27.5	N/A
Turnout		3,904	52.7	−22.3
South African hold		Swing	N/A	

General election 1938: Hospital
Party	Candidate	Votes	%	±%
United	Robert Hugh Henderson	4,449	77.7	+14.7
Dominion	G. H. Kretzschmer	911	15.9	New
Labour	S. Freedman	319	5.6	New
Rejected ballots		45	0.8	-0.7
Majority		3,538	61.8	N/A
Turnout		5,724	63.5	+10.8
United hold		Swing	N/A	
