= John Sydney Marwick =

South African colonial administrator (1875–1958)

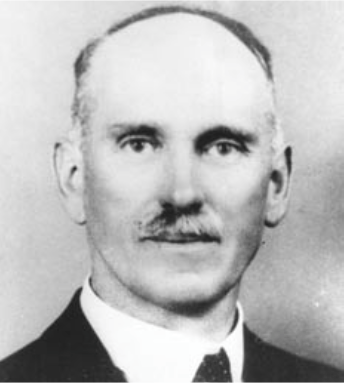

Member of the House of Assembly
- In office 1920–1943
- Constituency: Illovo

Personal details
- Born: 17 June 1875 Richmond, Colony of Natal
- Died: 18 April 1958 (aged 82)
- Party: Unionist Party; South African Party; Dominion Party
- Occupation: Colonial administrator, native affairs official

John Sydney Marwick (17 June 1875 – 18 April 1958) was a South African colonial administrator and Native Affairs official best known for organizing the evacuation of thousands of African mine workers from the Witwatersrand in Johannesburg to Natal at the outbreak of the Second Boer War in 1899. The event became known as the Marwick March.

He later served in the Native Affairs administration of the Transvaal and was elected as a member of the House of Assembly for the Illovo constituency in 1920.

== Early life ==
Marwick was born in Richmond in the Colony of Natal. He entered government service at a young age and joined the Natal Native Affairs Department. He became fluent in isiZulu and developed administrative experience in labor matters involving migrant workers from Zululand employed in the gold mines of Johannesburg.

== The Marwick March ==
By the late 1890s, and only 21 years old at the time, Marwick became the Zuid-Afrikaansche Republiek (ZAR)-appointed Native Agent for Natal and Zululand in Johannesburg to look after the interests of Black mine workers. When tensions between the British Empire and the two Boer republics, Transvaal and Oranje Vrystaat escalated in 1899, many gold mines on the Witwatersrand ceased operations, leaving thousands of African migrant laborers stranded.

With railway lines commandeered for military use, Marwick negotiated safe passage with authorities of the Zuid Afrikaansche Republiek , among them General Piet Joubert, and organized a large overland march back to Natal. Workers assembled at the Witwatersrand Agricultural Showgrounds, and on 6 October 1899, approximately 7,000–8,000 African workers travelled on foot from Johannesburg to the Natal border near Hattingspruit, a journey of more than 400 kilometers. On October 8, they had reached the town of Heidelberg, where a further 120 men, women, and children who were unable to continue onto a train heading for Natal joined them.

The march was completed shortly before the formal outbreak of the Second Boer War on 11 October 1899. From the march, Marwick was given the name Umuhle, meaning the good one, while others called him Umubi, the bad one.

Peka kaDinuzulu, son of King Dinuzulu kaCetshwayo, was also one of the participants in the march, including the young sister of Charlotte Maxeke, Katie Makanya, who missed the train in Johannesburg.

== Later career ==
During and after the war, Marwick continued to serve in the Native Affairs administration. He was associated with labor recruitment and administrative work linked to the British authorities in the Transvaal.

In 1920, he was elected to the House of Assembly of South Africa representing the Illovo constituency. As in the rest of Natal, Illovo's electorate was largely English-speaking and conservative. Marwick became the sole MP, representing the seat for all 23 years of its existence, initially elected for the Unionist Party. The following year, the Unionists merged into the governing South African Party, and Marwick was re-elected unopposed under the SAP banner in the 1921 snap general election. He continued to represent the SAP all through the 1920s, facing only an independent challenger in 1924 and standing unopposed again in 1929 and 1933, but when the SAP merged into the United Party in 1934, Marwick was one of a number of pro-British MPs who objected to the formation of the new party, in particular the fact that it was led by J. B. M. Hertzog. This group instead formed the Dominion Party, and while this new party would never become a major player nationally, it was quite influential in Natal. Marwick was able to benefit from incumbency, successfully defending the seat from a UP challenger in 1938, and moving to the affluent Durban seat of Pinetown on the constituency's disappearance in 1943.

== Personal life ==
Marwick married Edith Evans Rowe in 1901. He remained active in public life for several decades and died on 18 April 1958. According to later accounts, some descendants of the 1899 march participants attended his funeral in recognition of his role in their safe return to Natal.

== Legacy ==
The Marwick March is regarded by some historians as one of the largest organized civilian migrations in southern Africa at the outbreak of the Second Boer War. It highlights the often-overlooked role of African migrant laborers during the conflict and the complexities of colonial administration at the turn of the twentieth century.

South African author Fred Khumalo wrote a book, The Longest March, published in 2019, about the march. Khumalo went and undertook the same march, walking the same route as the miners in 2019.
