= Magaliesberg (House of Assembly of South Africa constituency) =

- Former constituency for the South African House of Assembly
- Province: Transvaal
- Electorate: 2,457 (1929)

Former constituency
- Created: 1929
- Abolished: 1938
- Number of members: 1
- Last MHA: S. F. Alberts (UP)
- Created from: Witwatersberg

Magaliesberg was a short-lived constituency in the Transvaal Province of South Africa, which existed from 1929 to 1938. It covered a rural area around the Magaliesberg mountains, on the outskirts of Pretoria. Throughout its existence it elected one member to the House of Assembly and one to the Transvaal Provincial Council.

== Franchise notes ==
When the Union of South Africa was formed in 1910, the electoral qualifications in use in each pre-existing colony were kept in place. In the Transvaal Colony, and its predecessor the South African Republic, the vote was restricted to white men, and as such, elections in the Transvaal Province were held on a whites-only franchise from the beginning. The franchise was also restricted by property and education qualifications until the 1933 general election, following the passage of the Women's Enfranchisement Act, 1930 and the Franchise Laws Amendment Act, 1931. From then on, the franchise was given to all white citizens aged 21 or over. Non-whites remained disenfranchised until the end of apartheid and the introduction of universal suffrage in 1994.

== History ==
Like most of the rural Transvaal, Magaliesberg was a conservative seat with a largely Afrikaans-speaking electorate. It was held for its entire existence by a single MP, Sarel François Alberts, who had previously contested Witwatersberg for the National Party on two occasions. Magaliesberg was a more favourable seat for the NP than its predecessor, and Alberts was able to handily defeat former Witwatersberg MP N. J. Pretorius. In 1933, their parties - the NP and the South African Party - contested the election as a coalition, and Alberts, like many other incumbent MPs across South Africa, was unopposed for re-election. He followed most of his party into the United Party in 1934, and left parliament when Magaliesberg was abolished in 1938.

== Members ==
Election	Member	Party
1929	S. F. Alberts	National
1933	S. F. Alberts	National
1934	S. F. Alberts	United
1938	Constituency abolished	

== Detailed results ==
=== Elections in the 1920s ===
General election 1929: Magaliesberg
Party	Candidate	Votes	%	±%
National	S. F. Alberts	1,210	58.8	New
South African	N. J. Pretorius	819	39.8	New
Rejected ballots		29	1.4	N/A
Majority		391	19.0	N/A
Turnout		2,058	83.8	N/A
National win (new seat)				

=== Elections in the 1930s ===
General election 1933: Magaliesberg
Party	Candidate	Votes	%	±%
National	S. F. Alberts	Unopposed		
National hold				
