= Ophirton (House of Assembly of South Africa constituency) =

- Former constituency for the South African House of Assembly
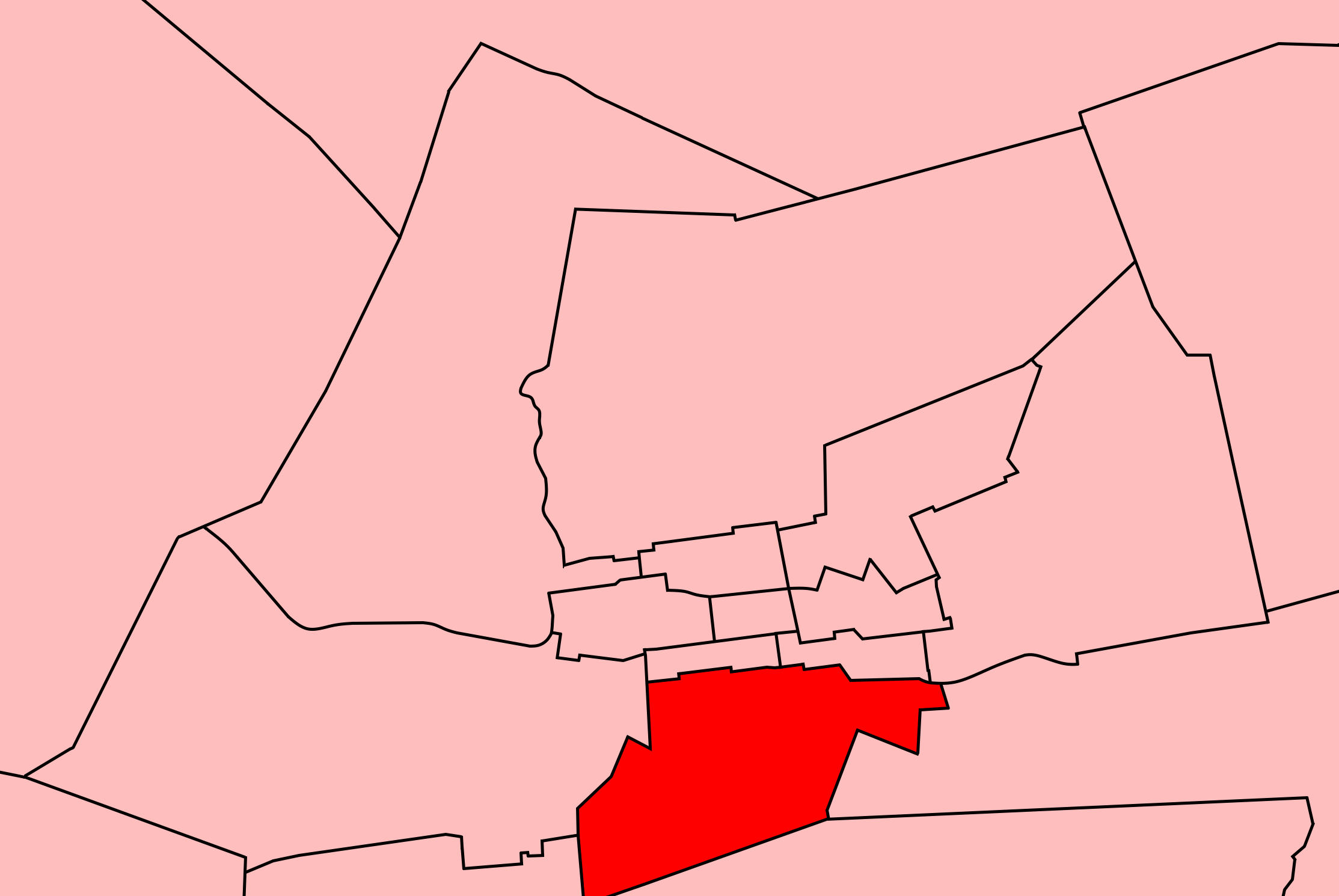
- Location of Ophirton within Johannesburg (1915)
- Province: Transvaal
- Electorate: 2,188 (1915)

Former constituency
- Created: 1915
- Abolished: 1920
- Number of members: 1
- Last MHA: Robert Raine (Un)
- Created from: Denver; Langlaagte; Turffontein
- Replaced by: Commissioner St; Jeppes; Langlaagte

Ophirton was a short-lived constituency in the Transvaal Province of South Africa, which existed only for the 1915 general election. It covered a part of Johannesburg's inner southern suburbs centred on the suburb of Ophirton. Throughout its existence it elected one member to the House of Assembly and one to the Transvaal Provincial Council.

== Franchise notes ==
When the Union of South Africa was formed in 1910, the electoral qualifications in use in each pre-existing colony were kept in place. In the Transvaal Colony, and its predecessor the South African Republic, the vote was restricted to white men, and as such, elections in the Transvaal Province were held on a whites-only franchise from the beginning. The franchise was also restricted by property and education qualifications until the 1933 general election, following the passage of the Women's Enfranchisement Act, 1930 and the Franchise Laws Amendment Act, 1931. From then on, the franchise was given to all white citizens aged 21 or over. Non-whites remained disenfranchised until the end of apartheid and the introduction of universal suffrage in 1994.

== History ==
Ophirton was created in 1915 as part of a general increase of representation for Johannesburg's urban area. Most of it, including Ophirton itself, had previously been part of the Turffontein constituency, while other parts came in from Langlaagte and Denver. Its sole MP, Robert Raine, was a member of the Unionist Party, and was elected by a healthy margin over the Labour candidate. He would only serve for five years, but by that time, a new delimitation had abolished the constituency again, most of its surface area going to Commissioner Street while the western part, including Ophirton itself, joined Langlaagte and the eastern part joined the recreated Jeppes constituency.

== Members ==
Election	Member	Party
1915	Robert Raine	Unionist
1920	Constituency abolished	

== Detailed results ==
=== Elections in the 1910s ===
General election 1915: Ophirton
Party	Candidate	Votes	%	±%
Unionist	Robert Raine	880	57.0	New
Labour	J. Hindman	534	34.6	New
National	J. L. P. Erasmus	131	8.5	New
Majority		346	22.4	N/A
Turnout		1,545	70.6	N/A
Unionist win (new seat)				
