= J. J. Ware =

Australian trade unionist and South African politician

John Joseph Ware

Member of the Transvaal Provincial Council
- In office 15 September 1910 – 1915
- Preceded by: Constituency created
- Constituency: Fordsburg

Senator for Transvaal
- In office 1915 – 28 June 1921

Personal details
- Born: 1858 Sydney, Australia
- Died: 28 June 1921 (aged 62–63) Johannesburg, South Africa
- Party: Transvaal Independent Labour Party; Labour Party

John Joseph Ware (1858 – 28 June 1921), sometimes known as "Honest John", was an Australian trade unionist, who became a politician in South Africa.

Born in Sydney, Australia, Ware became a stonemason and joined the Sydney Operative Masons' Society. He represented the union at a conference in Sydney which formally established the Australian Labor Party. In 1897, Ware emigrated to the Transvaal, where he joined the South African Operative Masons' Society. He also became active in the Witwatersrand Trades and Labour Council, becoming its president in 1906.

On 1 February 1906, Ware won a seat on Johannesburg Town Council, through a by-election for Fordsburg. He also served as deputy mayor of Johannesburg, and on its school board. He initially represented the Transvaal Political and Labour League, then later in 1906 was one of the first executive members of the Transvaal Independent Labour Party, but disassociated himself from it in 1907, objecting to its socialism. One of the most conservative trade union leaders, he argued that only white workers should be permitted to undertake skilled work.

In 1910, Ware was appointed as one of two vice presidents of the newly founded South African Labour Party. In 1910, he won the Fordsburg seat on the Transvaal Provincial Council. In 1915, he was appointed to the Senate of South Africa, holding his seat until his death.

He died on 28 June 1921 in Johannesburg.
