= Middelburg (House of Assembly of South Africa constituency) =

- Former constituency for the South African House of Assembly
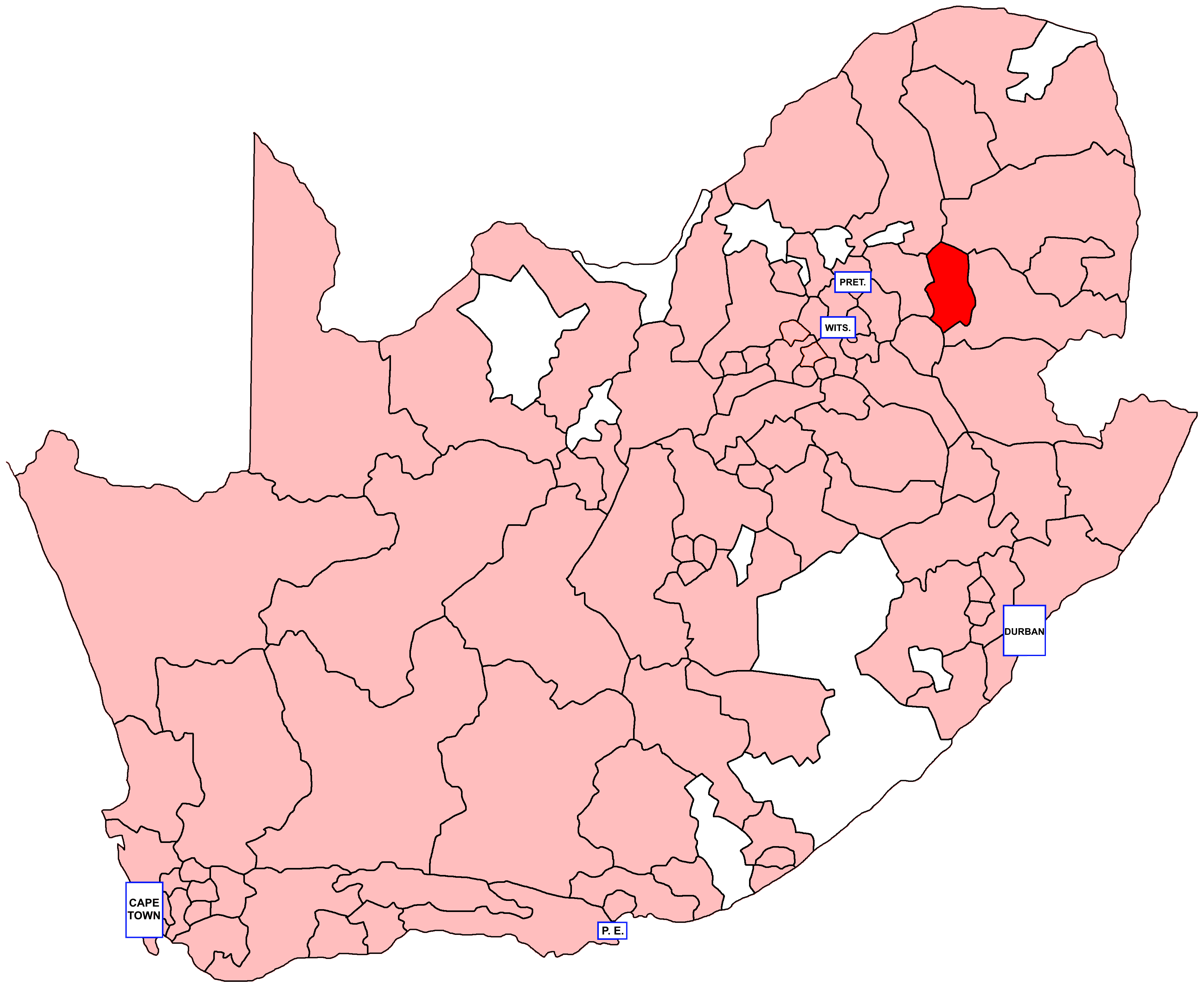
- Location of Middelburg within South Africa (1981)
- Province: Transvaal
- Electorate: 24,251 (1989)

Former constituency
- Created: 1910; 1966
- Abolished: 1948; 1994
- Number of members: 1
- Last MHA: H. J. Coetzee (CP)
- Created from: Bethal-Middelburg (1966)
- Replaced by: Bethal-Middelburg (1948); Mpumalanga (1994)

Middelburg was a constituency in the Transvaal Province of South Africa, which existed from 1910 to 1948 and from 1966 to 1994. Named after the town of Middelburg, it covered a part of the eastern Transvaal along the border with Eswatini. Throughout its existence it elected one member to the House of Assembly and one to the Transvaal Provincial Council.

== Franchise notes ==
When the Union of South Africa was formed in 1910, the electoral qualifications in use in each pre-existing colony were kept in place. In the Transvaal Colony, and its predecessor the South African Republic, the vote was restricted to white men, and as such, elections in the Transvaal Province were held on a whites-only franchise from the beginning. The franchise was also restricted by property and education qualifications until the 1933 general election, following the passage of the Women's Enfranchisement Act, 1930 and the Franchise Laws Amendment Act, 1931. From then on, the franchise was given to all white citizens aged 21 or over. Non-whites remained disenfranchised until the end of apartheid and the introduction of universal suffrage in 1994.

== History ==
Like most of the rural Transvaal, Middelburg had a largely Afrikaans-speaking electorate. Its longest-serving MP, Jan Dirk Heyns, was initially elected for the National Party, but followed J. B. M. Hertzog into the United Party in 1934. Middelburg remained a UP seat until its abolition in 1948, even with Heyns retiring in 1938 and Hertzog bolting from the party in 1939, but the popularity of Jan Smuts in the Transvaal likely helped his party retain the seat.

In 1948, Middelburg was merged with the neighbouring seat of Bethal, but the two were separated again in 1966, and the recreated Middelburg constituency was safe for the NP. The governing party faced opposition mainly from the right, and in 1987, the Conservative Party managed to muster enough strength to capture the seat - they held it until the end of apartheid.

== Members ==
Election	Member	Party
1910	G. J. W. du Toit	Het Volk
1915	J. L. Hamman	South African
1920	J. D. Heyns	National
1921	J. D. Heyns	National
1924	J. D. Heyns	National
1929	J. D. Heyns	National
1933	J. D. Heyns	National
1934	J. D. Heyns	United
1938	P. J. Bosman	United
1943	H. O. Eksteen	United
1948	Constituency abolished	

Election	Member	Party
1966	J. W. Rall	National
1970	J. W. Rall	National
1974	J. W. Rall	National
1977	J. W. Ligthelm	National
1981	J. W. Ligthelm	National
1987	H. J. Coetzee	Conservative
1989	H. J. Coetzee	Conservative
1994	Constituency abolished	

== Detailed results ==
=== Elections in the 1910s ===
General election 1910: Middelburg
Party	Candidate	Votes	%	±%
Het Volk	G. J. W. du Toit	Unopposed		
Het Volk win (new seat)				

General election 1915: Middelburg
Party	Candidate	Votes	%	±%
South African	J. L. Hamman	1,351	56.1	N/A
National	N. H. van der Walt	1,057	43.9	New
Majority		294	12.2	N/A
Turnout		2,408	76.6	N/A
South African hold		Swing	N/A	

=== Elections in the 1920s ===
General election 1920: Middelburg
Party	Candidate	Votes	%	±%
National	J. D. Heyns	1,091	50.6	+6.7
South African	J. L. Hamman	1,065	49.4	−6.7
Majority		26	1.2	N/A
Turnout		2,156	74.9	−1.7
National gain from South African		Swing	+6.7	

General election 1921: Middelburg
Party	Candidate	Votes	%	±%
National	J. D. Heyns	1,222	51.4	+0.8
South African	J. L. Hamman	1,157	48.6	−0.8
Majority		65	2.8	+1.6
Turnout		2,379	75.7	+0.8
National hold		Swing	+0.8	

General election 1924: Middelburg
Party	Candidate	Votes	%	±%
National	J. D. Heyns	1,239	53.3	+1.9
South African	B. D. Bierman	1,076	46.3	−2.3
Rejected ballots		9	0.4	N/A
Majority		163	7.0	+4.2
Turnout		2,324	86.3	+10.6
National hold		Swing	+2.1	

General election 1929: Middelburg
Party	Candidate	Votes	%	±%
National	J. D. Heyns	1,259	54.5	+1.2
South African	B. D. Bierman	986	42.7	−3.6
Rejected ballots		66	2.8	+2.4
Majority		273	11.8	+4.8
Turnout		2,311	86.1	−0.2
National hold		Swing	+2.4	

=== Elections in the 1930s ===
General election 1933: Middelburg
Party	Candidate	Votes	%	±%
National	J. D. Heyns	Unopposed		
National hold				

General election 1938: Middelburg
Party	Candidate	Votes	%	±%
United	P. J. Bosman	2,632	60.2	N/A
Purified National	T. McDonald	1,692	38.7	New
Rejected ballots		46	1.1	N/A
Majority		940	21.5	N/A
Turnout		4,370	85.2	N/A
United hold		Swing	N/A	
