= Illovo (House of Assembly of South Africa constituency) =

- Former constituency for the South African House of Assembly
- Province: Natal
- Electorate: 5,378 (1938)

Former constituency
- Created: 1920
- Abolished: 1943
- Number of members: 1
- Last MHA: J. S. Marwick (Dom)
- Created from: Umzimkulu
- Replaced by: Natal South Coast

Illovo was a constituency in the Natal Province of South Africa, which existed from 1920 to 1943. It covered a coastal area south of Durban, centred on its namesake town. Throughout its existence it elected one member to the House of Assembly.

== Franchise notes ==
When the Union of South Africa was formed in 1910, the electoral qualifications in use in each pre-existing colony were kept in place. The franchise used in the Natal Colony, while theoretically not restricted by race, was significantly less liberal than that of the Cape, and no more than a few hundred non-white electors ever qualified. In 1908, an estimated 200 of the 22,786 electors in the colony were of non-European descent, and by 1935, only one remained. By 1958, when the last non-white voters in the Cape were taken off the rolls, Natal too had an all-white electorate. The franchise was also restricted by property and education qualifications until the 1933 general election, following the passage of the Women's Enfranchisement Act, 1930 and the Franchise Laws Amendment Act, 1931. From then on, the franchise was given to all white citizens aged 21 or over, which remained the case until the end of apartheid and the introduction of universal suffrage in 1994.

== History ==
As in the rest of Natal, Illovo's electorate was largely English-speaking and conservative. Its sole MP, representing the seat for all 23 years of its existence, was John Sydney Marwick, who was initially elected for the Unionist Party in 1920. The following year, the Unionists merged into the governing South African Party, and Marwick was re-elected unopposed under the SAP banner in the 1921 snap general election. He continued to represent the SAP all through the 1920s, facing only an independent challenger in 1924 and standing unopposed again in 1929 and 1933, but when the SAP merged into the United Party in 1934, Marwick was one of a number of pro-British MPs who objected to the formation of the new party, in particular the fact that it was led by J. B. M. Hertzog. This group instead formed the Dominion Party, and while this new party would never become a major player nationally, it was quite influential in Natal. Marwick was able to benefit from incumbency, successfully defending the seat from a UP challenger in 1938, and moving to the affluent Durban seat of Pinetown on the constituency's disappearance in 1943.

== Members ==
Election	Member	Party
1920	John Sydney Marwick	Unionist
1921	John Sydney Marwick	South African
1924	John Sydney Marwick	South African
1929	John Sydney Marwick	South African
1933	John Sydney Marwick	South African
1934	John Sydney Marwick	Dominion
1938	John Sydney Marwick	Dominion
1943	Constituency abolished	

== Detailed results ==
=== Elections in the 1920s ===
General election 1920: Illovo
Party	Candidate	Votes	%	±%
Unionist	J. S. Marwick	647	59.4	New
South African	Alfred Fawcus	442	40.6	+26.6
Majority		205	18.8	N/A
Turnout		1,089	61.6	N/A
Unionist win (new seat)				

General election 1921: Illovo
Party	Candidate	Votes	%	±%
South African	J. S. Marwick	Unopposed		
South African hold				

General election 1924: Illovo
Party	Candidate	Votes	%	±%
South African	J. S. Marwick	1,100	85.1	N/A
Independent	A. Fawcus	182	14.1	New
Rejected ballots		10	0.8	N/A
Majority		918	71.0	N/A
Turnout		1,292	63.9	N/A
South African hold		Swing	N/A	

General election 1929: Illovo
Party	Candidate	Votes	%	±%
South African	J. S. Marwick	Unopposed		
South African hold				

=== Elections in the 1930s ===
General election 1933: Illovo
Party	Candidate	Votes	%	±%
South African	J. S. Marwick	Unopposed		
South African hold				

General election 1938: Illovo
Party	Candidate	Votes	%	±%
Dominion	J. S. Marwick	2,576	59.5	N/A
United	W. E. Thrash	1,724	39.8	New
Rejected ballots		30	0.7	N/A
Majority		852	19.7	N/A
Turnout		4,330	80.5	N/A
Dominion hold		Swing	N/A	
