= Bertha Solomon =

South African politician (1892–1969)

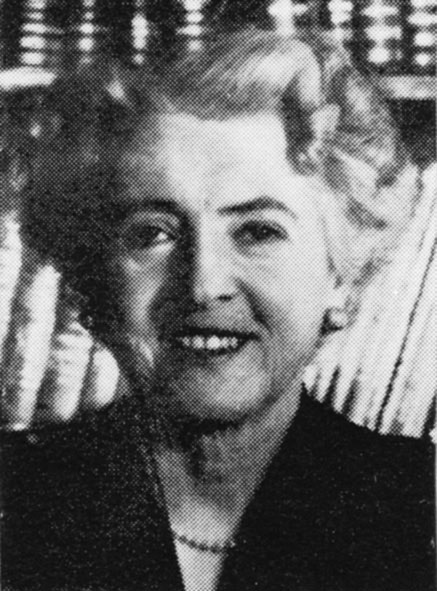
- Born: January 1, 1892; Minsk
- Died: November 22, 1969 (aged 77)
- Occupations: Lawyer and politician

Bertha Solomon (January 1, 1892 – November 22, 1969) was a South African lawyer and politician and one of the country's early advocates for women's rights.

== Biography ==
Solomon was born in Minsk on January 1, 1892. At four years old, she and her older sister were taken by their mother, Sonia Schwartz, to join their father, a Zionist pioneer named Idel Schwarz, in South Africa.

She graduated from Anglican Diocesan College in 1911 with a BA in Classics, and then South African College where she received an MA. Afterwards she taught Latin at Milburn House School for Girls in Cape Town, where she met her husband Charles Solomon. They moved to Johannesburg, and had two children. Bertha Solomon began studying law, and was the second South African woman to be admitted to the bar in Johannesburg. Solomon was one of the first advocates of women's rights in South Africa, and helped fight for women's suffrage in South Africa, which passed in 1930. In 1933 she ran for and was elected to the Transvaal Provincial Council, where she served for five years. In 1938, she was elected to serve as a United Party member of Parliament, a seat she held until her retirement in 1958. One of her accomplishments was the 1949 opening of a recreation center, which was named after her and was the first of its kind in Johannesburg.

For much of her time in parliament, she championed the Matrimonial Affairs Act which finally passed in 1953, and was sometimes called “Bertha’s Bill”, which protected women's rights to property, income, and children. She was a member and leader in the National Council of Women, and founded the South African Women's Auxiliary Air Force during World War II.

She was a supporter of Hebrew University and visited Israel a number of times. She considered herself a Zionist, and her daughter Joan married Michael Comay, Israel's Ambassador to the United Nations from 1960 to 1967.

Solomon died on November 22, 1969. De Villiers Graaff called Solomon "the pioneer in our Parliament of the implement for the removal of the legal disabilities of women."

== Publications ==
Time Remembered: The Story of a Fight. Cape Town: Timmins. 1968. (autobiography)

== See also ==
- List of first women lawyers and judges in Africa
