= Transvaal Independent Labour Party =

The Transvaal Independent Labour Party (ILP) was a political party in the Transvaal Colony.

The party was established in 1906 as a social democratic organisation, bringing together leading white trade unionists and some socialist activists. It was inspired by the British Independent Labour Party, from which it copied its constitution. Unlike the British party, it had nationalist sympathies, and the majority of its members held openly racist views, opposing Indian and Chinese immigration in particular. The main exceptions to this were Archie Crawford, Arthur Brittlebank and John Campbell, who argued that the party should admit non-whites. These racist views created difficulties in 1907, when Keir Hardie of the British ILP visited the colony as part of a speaking tour, but the party's leaders decided that their support for his socialist views trumped their opposition to his anti-racism speeches.

At the 1907 Transvaal general election, the party stood 13 candidates, of whom three were elected: J. Reid, Harry Sampson and Peter Whiteside. Other key leaders included James Thompson Bain, Tom Matthews and J. J. Ware. In 1910, the Transvaal Colony became part of the new Union of South Africa, and the ILP became part of a new South African Labour Party.
