= Braamfontein (House of Assembly of South Africa constituency) =

- Former constituency for the South African House of Assembly
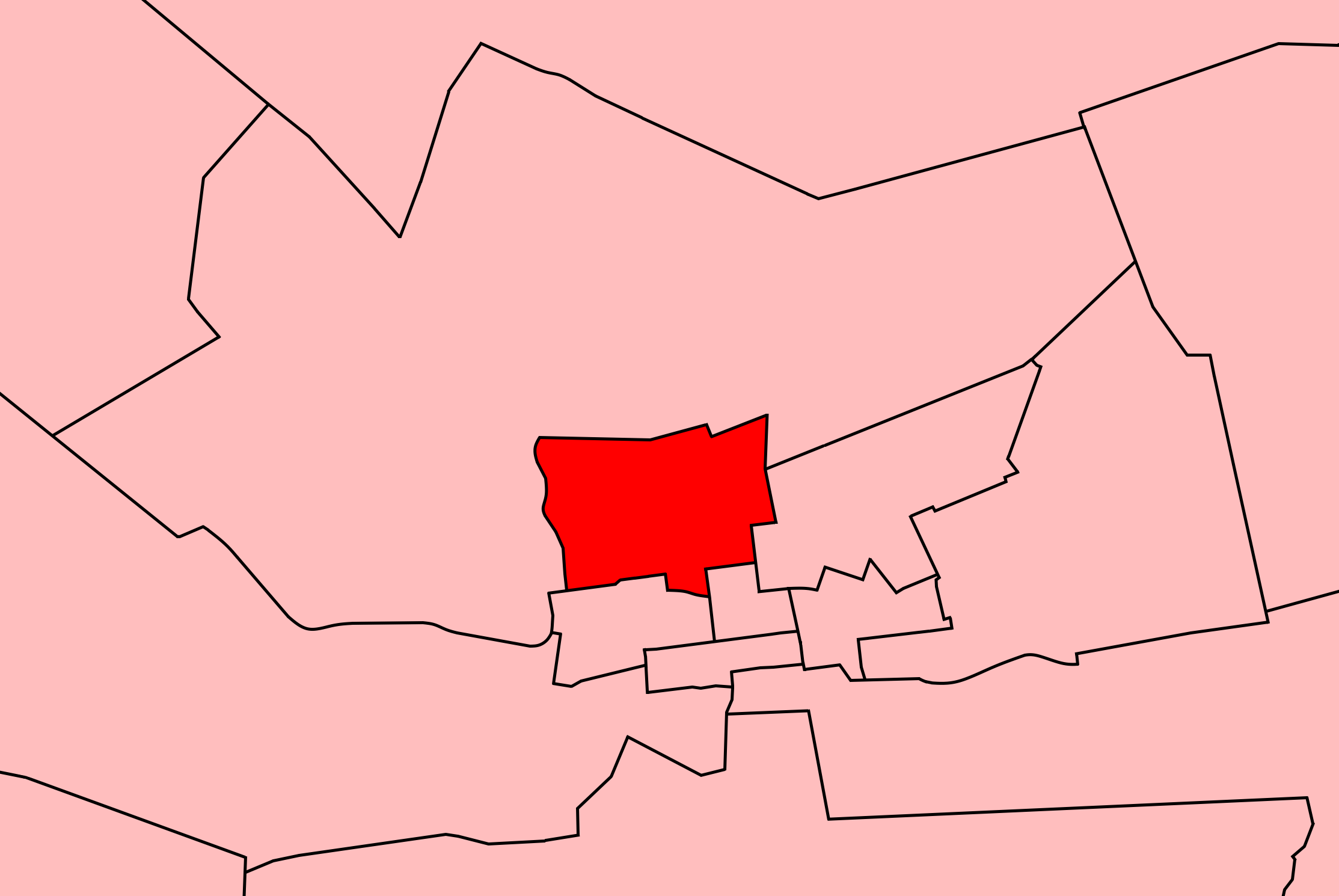
- Location of Braamfontein within Johannesburg (1910)
- Province: Transvaal

Former constituency
- Created: 1910
- Abolished: 1915
- Number of members: 1
- Last MHA: Aubrey Woolls-Sampson (Un)
- Replaced by: Hospital; Parktown

Braamfontein was a constituency in the Transvaal Province of South Africa, which existed from 1910 to 1915. It covered a part of Johannesburg's northern suburbs centred on the suburb of Braamfontein. Throughout its existence it elected one member to the House of Assembly and one to the Transvaal Provincial Council.

== Franchise notes ==
When the Union of South Africa was formed in 1910, the electoral qualifications in use in each pre-existing colony were kept in place. In the Transvaal Colony, and its predecessor the South African Republic, the vote was restricted to white men, and as such, elections in the Transvaal Province were held on a whites-only franchise from the beginning. The franchise was also restricted by property and education qualifications until the 1933 general election, following the passage of the Women's Enfranchisement Act, 1930 and the Franchise Laws Amendment Act, 1931. From then on, the franchise was given to all white citizens aged 21 or over. Non-whites remained disenfranchised until the end of apartheid and the introduction of universal suffrage in 1994.

== History ==
The Braamfontein constituency included some of Johannesburg's wealthiest suburbs, and as such was a safe seat for the Unionist Party. Its only election saw the Unionists defeat the Het Volk candidate by a solid margin, and when it was abolished in 1915, its two successor seats - Hospital, covering the inner-city parts of the seat including Braamfontein itself, and Parktown, covering the suburban areas to the north - were both safe Unionist seats as well.

== Members ==
| Election | Member | Party |
|---|---|---|
| 1910 | Aubrey Woolls-Sampson | Unionist |
| 1915 | Constituency abolished | |

== Detailed results ==
=== Elections in the 1910s ===
General election 1910: Braamfontein
| Party | Candidate | Votes | % | ±% |
|---|---|---|---|---|
| Unionist | Aubrey Woolls-Sampson | 1,185 | 60.5 | New |
| Het Volk | H. B. Papenfus | 775 | 39.5 | New |
| Majority | | 410 | 21.0 | N/A |
| Unionist win (new seat) | | | | |
