= Losberg (House of Assembly of South Africa constituency) =

- Former constituency for the South African House of Assembly
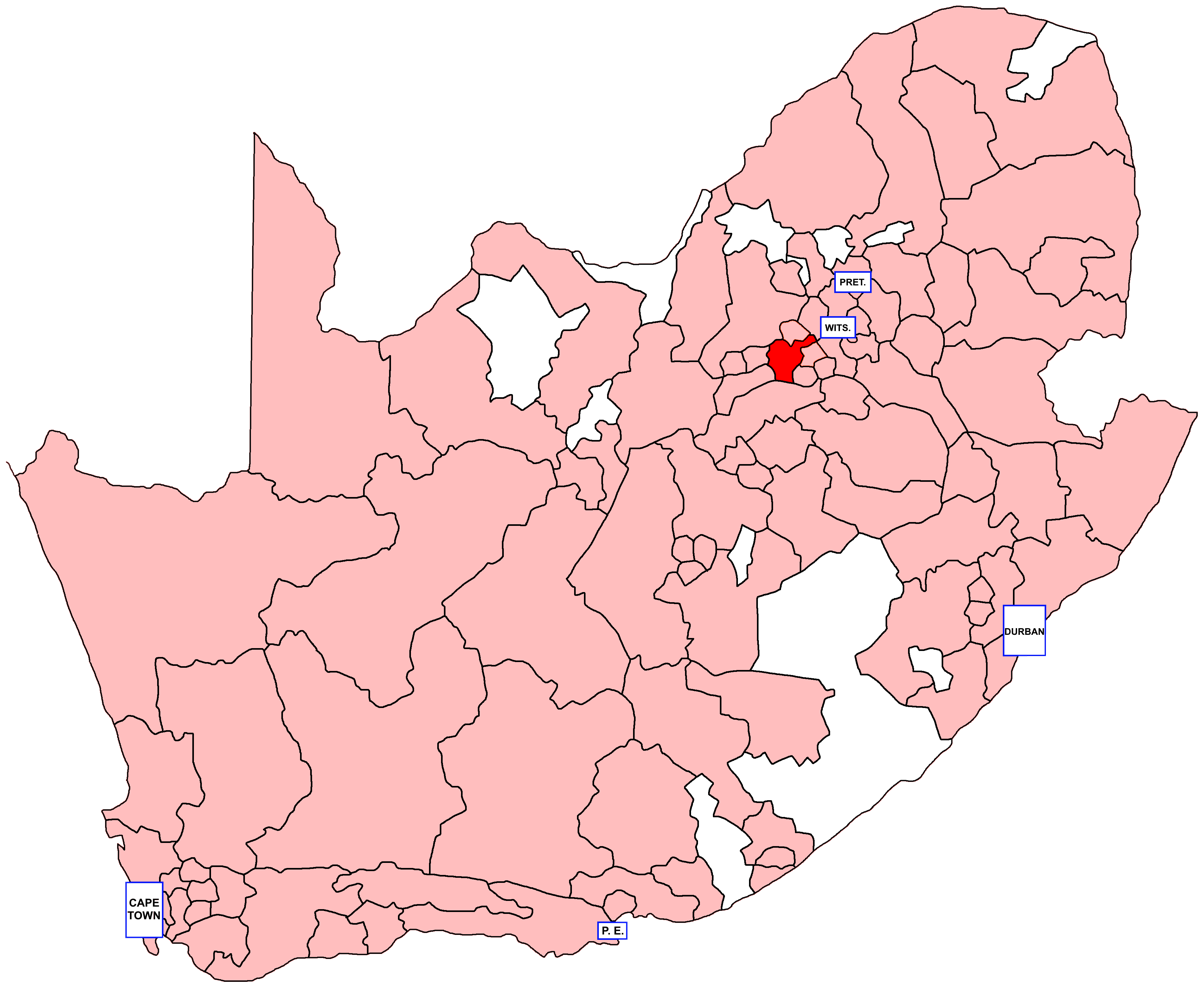
- Location of Losberg within South Africa (1981)
- Province: Transvaal
- Electorate: 23,170 (1989)

Former constituency
- Created: 1910
- Abolished: 1994
- Number of members: 1
- Last MHA: S. C. Jacobs (CP)
- Replaced by: Gauteng

Losberg was a constituency in the Transvaal Province of South Africa, which existed from 1910 to 1994. It covered a rural area adjacent to the western end of the Witwatersrand, and toward the end of its existence, was centred on the town of Fochville. Throughout its existence it elected one member to the House of Assembly and one to the Transvaal Provincial Council.

== Franchise notes ==
When the Union of South Africa was formed in 1910, the electoral qualifications in use in each pre-existing colony were kept in place. In the Transvaal Colony, and its predecessor the South African Republic, the vote was restricted to white men, and as such, elections in the Transvaal Province were held on a whites-only franchise from the beginning. The franchise was also restricted by property and education qualifications until the 1933 general election, following the passage of the Women's Enfranchisement Act, 1930 and the Franchise Laws Amendment Act, 1931. From then on, the franchise was given to all white citizens aged 21 or over. Non-whites remained disenfranchised until the end of apartheid and the introduction of universal suffrage in 1994.

== History ==
Losberg, like most of the Transvaal, was a conservative seat throughout its existence. For much of its history, it was a bellwether, being held by the governing party (or one of the governing parties) in every election from 1910 until 1981. Its two most prominent members were Louis Botha, who represented the seat as Prime Minister between 1915 and 1919, and future State President Nico Diederichs, who represented it from 1958 until 1975. In 1987, it was won by the Conservative Party, who held it in 1989.

== Members ==
Election	Member	Party
1910	T. F. J. Dreyer	South African
1915	Louis Botha	South African
1920	T. F. J. Dreyer	South African
1921	T. F. J. Dreyer	South African
1924	G. P. Brits	National
1929	G. P. Brits	National
1933	G. P. Brits	National
1934	G. P. Brits	United
1938	G. P. Brits	United
1943	J. B. Wolmarans	United
1948	G. P. Brits	HNP
1953	G. P. Brits	National
1958	Nico Diederichs	National
1961	Nico Diederichs	National
1966	Nico Diederichs	National
1970	Nico Diederichs	National
1974	J. Janson	National
1977	J. Janson	National
1981	A. P. Wright	National
1987	S. C. Jacobs	Conservative
1989	S. C. Jacobs	Conservative
1994	Constituency abolished	

== Detailed results ==
=== Elections in the 1910s ===
General election 1910: Losberg
Party	Candidate	Votes	%	±%
Het Volk	T. F. J. Dreyer	Unopposed		
Het Volk win (new seat)				

General election 1915: Losberg
Party	Candidate	Votes	%	±%
South African	Louis Botha	1,451	65.0	N/A
National	A. S. van Hees	780	35.0	New
Majority		671	30.0	N/A
Turnout		2,231	82.8	N/A
South African hold		Swing	N/A	

=== Elections in the 1920s ===
General election 1920: Losberg
Party	Candidate	Votes	%	±%
South African	T. F. J. Dreyer	1,292	59.8	−5.2
National	J. J. Pienaar	868	40.2	+5.2
Majority		424	19.6	−10.4
Turnout		2,160	74.4	−8.4
South African hold		Swing	-5.2	

General election 1921: Losberg
Party	Candidate	Votes	%	±%
South African	T. F. J. Dreyer	1,239	57.3	−1.5
National	J. B. Wolmarans	924	42.7	+1.5
Majority		315	16.6	−3.0
Turnout		2,163	70.6	−3.8
South African hold		Swing	-1.5	

General election 1924: Losberg
Party	Candidate	Votes	%	±%
National	G. P. Brits	1,206	51.0	+8.3
South African	T. F. J. Dreyer	1,150	48.6	−8.7
Rejected ballots		9	0.4	N/A
Majority		56	2.4	N/A
Turnout		2,365	82.4	+11.8
National gain from South African		Swing	+8.5	

General election 1929: Losberg
Party	Candidate	Votes	%	±%
National	G. P. Brits	1,156	50.3	−0.7
South African	J. B. Wolmarans	1,118	48.7	+0.1
Rejected ballots		24	1.0	+0.6
Majority		38	1.6	−0.8
Turnout		2,298	86.7	+4.3
National hold		Swing	-0.4	

=== Elections in the 1930s ===
General election 1933: Losberg
Party	Candidate	Votes	%	±%
National	G. P. Brits	Unopposed		
National hold				

General election 1938: Losberg
Party	Candidate	Votes	%	±%
United	G. P. Brits	2,787	61.1	N/A
Purified National	J. I. F. Brits	1,430	31.4	New
Independent	J. J. le Grange	314	6.9	New
Rejected ballots		28	0.6	N/A
Majority		1,357	29.8	N/A
Turnout		4,559	80.1	N/A
United hold		Swing	N/A	

=== Elections in the 1940s ===
General election 1943: Losberg
Party	Candidate	Votes	%	±%
United	J. B. Wolmarans	3,186	56.7	−4.8
Reunited National	J. P. Barnard	2,437	43.3	+11.7
Majority		749	11.4	−17.5
Turnout		5,623	77.0	−3.1
United hold		Swing	-8.8	
