= Harry Sampson =

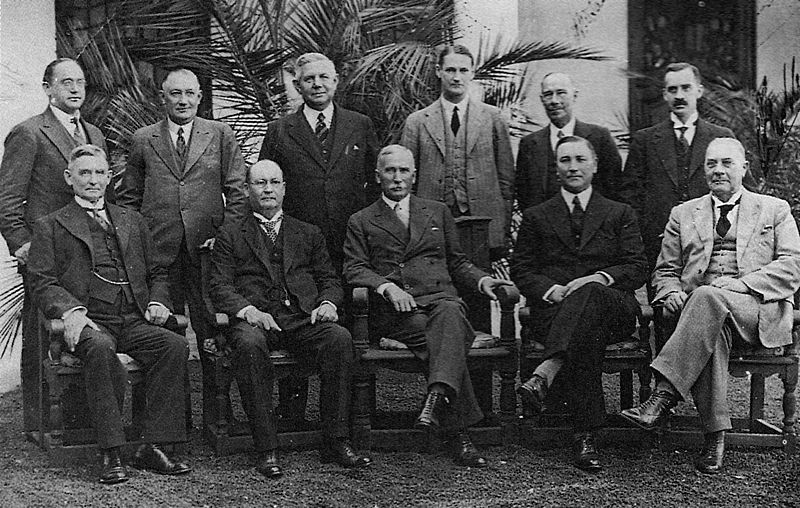

Henry William Sampson (12 May 1872 – 6 August 1938), often known as "Sammy", was an English-born South African trade unionist and politician.

Born in Islington London, Sampson completed an apprenticeship as a compositor and joined the London Society of Compositors. In 1892, he emigrated to the Cape Colony, where he joined the Cape Town Typographical Union, and was a founder of the Cape Town Trades Council. Following a strike, in 1897, he moved to East London, where he founded a local branch of the new South African Typographical Union (SATU), serving as its president for five years.

In 1903, Sampson moved to Johannesburg to become president of SATU, also becoming secretary of the Witwatersrand Trades Council. In these roles, he opposed Chinese immigration. He also founded the Transvaal Independent Labour Party (ILP), Transvaal Political Labour League, and the Transvaal Federation of Trade Unions.

In 1907, Sampson was elected to the Transvaal Legislative Assembly for the ILP, representing the City and Suburban constituency. When the House of Assembly was established in 1910, he merged the ILP into the new South African Labour Party, becoming its first chairman. He was elected in the Commissioner Street constituency, later representing Siemert and Jeppes.

In 1918, Sampson was made an Officer of the Order of the British Empire. He campaigned in support of miners suffering with phthisis, and in 1924 the government offered him the chair of the Phthisis Board, but he rejected the post as he would have had to resign his Parliamentary seat. In 1925, he represented South Africa at the International Labour Conference in Geneva, and then at the British Commonwealth Labour Conference in London.

The Labour Party split in two in 1928, and Sampson supported the section led by Frederic Creswell, which wished to remain part of the governing coalition. Sampson was appointed as Minister of Communications, Telecommunications and Postal Services and Public Works. In 1931, the Labour Party reunited, but Sampson refused to leave the Cabinet, and so was expelled from the party. He lost his seat in 1933 and retired from politics.
