= Witwatersberg (House of Assembly of South Africa constituency) =

- Former constituency for the South African House of Assembly
- Province: Transvaal
- Electorate: 18,144 (1977)

Former constituency
- Created: 1915; 1974
- Abolished: 1929; 1981
- Number of members: 1
- Last MHA: J. C. B. Schoeman (NP)
- Replaced by: Magaliesberg (1929)

Witwatersberg was a constituency in the Transvaal Province of South Africa, which existed from 1915 to 1929 and again from 1974 to 1981. It covered a rural area around the Witwatersberg mountains, adjacent to the Witwatersrand. Throughout its existence it elected one member to the House of Assembly and one to the Transvaal Provincial Council.

== Franchise notes ==
When the Union of South Africa was formed in 1910, the electoral qualifications in use in each pre-existing colony were kept in place. In the Transvaal Colony, and its predecessor the South African Republic, the vote was restricted to white men, and as such, elections in the Transvaal Province were held on a whites-only franchise from the beginning. The franchise was also restricted by property and education qualifications until the 1933 general election, following the passage of the Women's Enfranchisement Act, 1930 and the Franchise Laws Amendment Act, 1931. From then on, the franchise was given to all white citizens aged 21 or over. Non-whites remained disenfranchised until the end of apartheid and the introduction of universal suffrage in 1994.

== History ==
Like most of the rural Transvaal, Witwatersberg was a conservative seat with a largely Afrikaans-speaking electorate. It existed in two relatively brief iterations, and each time was only represented by a single MP. Nicolaas Jacobus Pretorius, its MP for the first iteration, was a member of the South African Party and fought off a series of National Party challenges, including one case in 1921 where the two candidates tied and Pretorius won the seat by drawing lots. In 1929, the seat was redrawn and renamed Magaliesberg, and Pretorius was defeated for election to the new seat by S. F. Alberts, whom he'd previously defeated in 1921 and 1924.

By the time the seat was recreated in 1974, the NP was South Africa's dominant party, and Witwatersberg was a safe seat for it. Its sole MP for this iteration, Johannes Cornelius Bothma Schoeman, moved to the recreated seat of North Rand in 1981.

== Members ==
Election	Member	Party
1915	N. J. Pretorius	South African
1920	N. J. Pretorius	South African
1921	N. J. Pretorius	South African
1924	N. J. Pretorius	South African
1929	Constituency abolished	

Election	Member	Party
1974	J. C. B. Schoeman	National
1977	J. C. B. Schoeman	National
1981	Constituency abolished	

== Detailed results ==
=== Elections in the 1910s ===
General election 1915: Witwatersberg
Party	Candidate	Votes	%	±%
South African	N. J. Pretorius	1,176	53.0	N/A
National	F. G. A. Wolmarans	1,041	47.0	New
Majority		135	6.0	N/A
Turnout		2,217	78.5	N/A
South African win (new seat)				

=== Elections in the 1920s ===
General election 1920: Witwatersberg
Party	Candidate	Votes	%	±%
South African	N. J. Pretorius	895	50.4	−2.6
National	T. C. Stoggberg	881	49.6	+2.6
Majority		14	0.8	−5.2
Turnout		1,776	68.7	−9.8
South African hold		Swing	-2.6	

General election 1921: Witwatersberg
Party	Candidate	Votes	%	±%
South African	N. J. Pretorius	943	50.0	−0.4
National	S. F. Alberts	943	50.0	+0.4
Majority		0	0.0	−0.8
Turnout		1,886	69.3	+0.6
South African hold		Swing	-0.4	

Election decided by lot.

General election 1924: Witwatersberg
Party	Candidate	Votes	%	±%
South African	N. J. Pretorius	1,090	50.0	−0.4
National	S. F. Alberts	1,073	49.2	−0.8
Rejected ballots		17	0.8	N/A
Majority		17	0.8	+0.8
Turnout		2,180	78.6	+9.3
South African hold		Swing	+0.4	
