= Umzimkulu (House of Assembly of South Africa constituency) =

- Former constituency for the South African House of Assembly
- Province: Natal

Former constituency
- Created: 1910
- Abolished: 1920
- Number of members: 1
- Last MHA: Frank Reynolds (SAP)
- Replaced by: Illovo

Umzimkulu was a short-lived constituency in the Natal Province of South Africa, which existed from 1910 to 1920. It covered the southern end of the province, around the Umzimkulu River, and bordered both the Cape Province and Lesotho. Throughout its existence it elected one member to the House of Assembly.

== Franchise notes ==
When the Union of South Africa was formed in 1910, the electoral qualifications in use in each pre-existing colony were kept in place. The franchise used in the Natal Colony, while theoretically not restricted by race, was significantly less liberal than that of the Cape, and no more than a few hundred non-white electors ever qualified. In 1908, an estimated 200 of the 22,786 electors in the colony were of non-European descent, and by 1935, only one remained. By 1958, when the last non-white voters in the Cape were taken off the rolls, Natal too had an all-white electorate. The franchise was also restricted by property and education qualifications until the 1933 general election, following the passage of the Women's Enfranchisement Act, 1930 and the Franchise Laws Amendment Act, 1931. From then on, the franchise was given to all white citizens aged 21 or over, which remained the case until the end of apartheid and the introduction of universal suffrage in 1994.

== History ==
As in most of Natal, the electorate of Umzimkulu was largely English-speaking and conservative. Its sole MP, Frank Reynolds (referred to as "F. W. Reynolds" in some sources) was first elected as an independent in 1910 (Natal having had no party system before unification), defeating a candidate of the governing South African Party. He subsequently joined the SAP, and in 1915 was re-elected unopposed for the party. In 1920, Umzimkulu disappeared from the electoral map, largely replaced by the Illovo constituency, and Reynolds did not stand for election in the new seat.

== Members ==
Election	Member	Party
1910	Frank Reynolds	Independent
1915	Frank Reynolds	South African
1920	Constituency abolished	

== Detailed results ==
=== Elections in the 1910s ===
General election 1910: Umzimkulu
Party	Candidate	Votes	%	±%
Independent	Frank Reynolds	534	58.6	New
South African	J. Kirkaman	377	41.4	New
Majority		157	17.2	N/A
Independent win (new seat)				

General election 1915: Umzimkulu
Party	Candidate	Votes	%	±%
South African	Frank Reynolds	Unopposed		
South African hold				
