= Robert Hugh Henderson =

Robert Hugh Henderson, CMG (6 March 1862 – 6 October 1956) was a South African businessman and politician. He was Mayor of Kimberley during the Siege of Kimberley. He was Minister without Portfolio from 1938 to 1939.
