= Jeppes (House of Assembly of South Africa constituency) =

- Former constituency for the South African House of Assembly
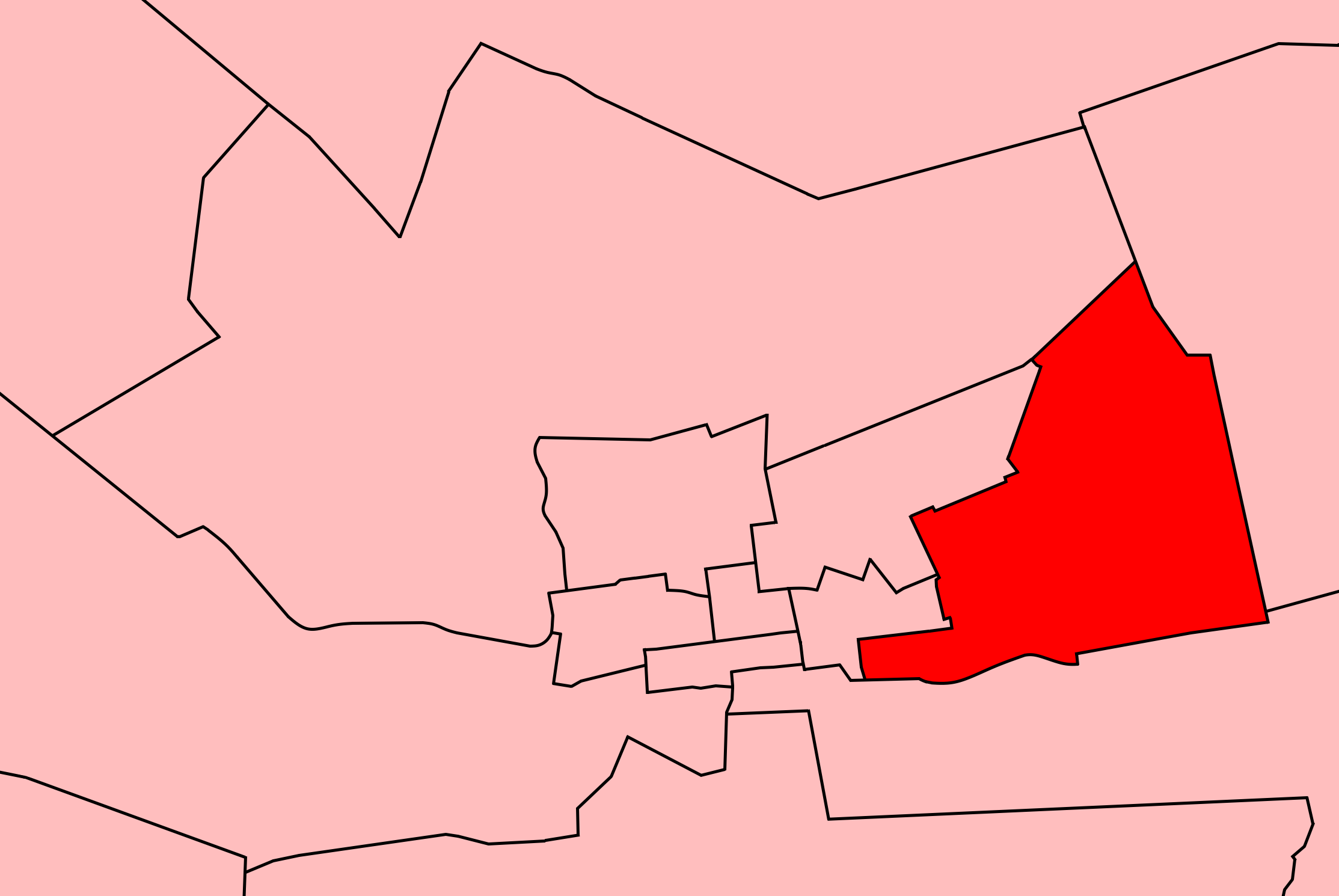
- Location of Jeppes within Johannesburg (1910)
- Province: Transvaal
- Electorate: 20,876 (1989)

Former constituency
- Created: 1910
- Abolished: 1994
- Number of members: 1
- Last MHA: H. J. Bekker (NP)
- Replaced by: Gauteng

Jeppes (known as Siemert for the 1915 general election and as Jeppe in its later years) was a constituency in the Transvaal Province of South Africa, which existed from 1910 to 1994. It covered parts of the inner eastern suburbs of Johannesburg, centred on the suburb of Jeppestown. Throughout its existence it elected one member to the House of Assembly and one to the Transvaal Provincial Council.

== Franchise notes ==
When the Union of South Africa was formed in 1910, the electoral qualifications in use in each pre-existing colony were kept in place. In the Transvaal Colony, and its predecessor the South African Republic, the vote was restricted to white men, and as such, elections in the Transvaal Province were held on a whites-only franchise from the beginning. The franchise was also restricted by property and education qualifications until the 1933 general election, following the passage of the Women's Enfranchisement Act, 1930 and the Franchise Laws Amendment Act, 1931. From then on, the franchise was given to all white citizens aged 21 or over. Non-whites remained disenfranchised until the end of apartheid and the introduction of universal suffrage in 1994.

== History ==
As a largely working-class seat, Jeppes was an early stronghold of the South African Labour Party. At the first general election in 1910, the seat was won by Labour party leader Frederic Creswell, who moved to the newly created seat of Bezuidenhout in 1915, and the rump Jeppes seat (renamed Siemert for this election only) was won by fellow Labour member Harry Sampson. Sampson would hold the seat until 1933, when he was defeated by Roos Party candidate Hjalmar Reitz, and starting from 1938 the seat would be held by the United Party's Bertha Solomon. Following Solomon's retirement in 1958, the seat became marginal, falling to the National Party in 1966 and again in 1977. The National MP elected in 1977, Koos van der Merwe, defected to the Conservative Party on its foundation in 1982, but moved to the Overvaal constituency in 1987. That year, the Nationals won Jeppe back, and held it at the last whites-only election in 1989.

== Members ==
Election	Member	Party
1910	Frederic Creswell	Labour
1915	Harry Sampson	Labour
1920	Harry Sampson	Labour
1921	Harry Sampson	Labour
1924	Harry Sampson	Labour
1929	Harry Sampson	Labour
1933	Hjalmar Reitz	Roos Party
1938	Bertha Solomon	United
1943	Bertha Solomon	United
1948	Bertha Solomon	United
1953	Bertha Solomon	United
1958	F. J. C. Cronje	United
1961	F. J. C. Cronje	United
1966	M. W. Botha	National
1970	Hyman Miller	United
1974	Hyman Miller	United
1977	Koos van der Merwe	National
1981	Koos van der Merwe	National
1982	Koos van der Merwe	Conservative
1987	H. J. Bekker	National
1989	H. J. Bekker	National
1994	Constituency abolished	

== Detailed results ==
=== Elections in the 1910s ===
General election 1910: Jeppes
Party	Candidate	Votes	%	±%
Labour	Frederic Creswell	1,065	52.4	New
Unionist	R. Feetham	968	47.6	New
Majority		97	4.8	N/A
Labour win (new seat)				

General election 1915: Siemert
Party	Candidate	Votes	%	±%
Labour	Harry Sampson	909	60.5	+8.1
Unionist	A. E. Cowley	593	39.5	New
Majority		851	21.0	N/A
Turnout		1,502	71.0	N/A
Labour hold		Swing	N/A	

=== Elections in the 1920s ===
General election 1920: Jeppes
Party	Candidate	Votes	%	±%
Labour	Harry Sampson	1,257	83.3	+22.8
National	C. Grobbelaar	156	10.3	New
Ind. Socialist	C. B. Tyler	67	4.4	New
Unionist	D. Urquhart	28	1.9	−37.6
Majority		1,101	73.0	N/A
Turnout		1,508	48.3	−22.7
Labour hold		Swing	N/A	

General election 1921: Jeppes
Party	Candidate	Votes	%	±%
Labour	Harry Sampson	Unopposed		
Labour hold				

General election 1924: Jeppes
Party	Candidate	Votes	%	±%
Labour	Harry Sampson	1,301	64.8	N/A
South African	F. W. R. Robertson	690	34.4	New
Rejected ballots		17	0.8	N/A
Majority		611	30.4	N/A
Turnout		2,008	71.3	N/A
Labour hold		Swing	N/A	

General election 1929: Jeppes
Party	Candidate	Votes	%	±%
Labour (Creswell)	Harry Sampson	1,230	51.1	-13.7
South African	H. Carter	1,064	44.2	+10.2
Labour (N.C.)	H. Carruthers	101	4.2	N/A
Rejected ballots		13	0.5	-0.3
Majority		166	6.9	−23.9
Turnout		2,408	76.6	+5.3
Labour hold		Swing	-12.0	

=== Elections in the 1930s ===
General election 1933: Jeppes
Party	Candidate	Votes	%	±%
Roos	Hjalmar Reitz	2,552	65.3	New
Labour (Creswell)	Harry Sampson	1,330	34.0	−17.1
Rejected ballots		27	0.7	+0.2
Majority		1,222	31.3	N/A
Turnout		3,909	56.2	−20.4
Roos gain from Labour		Swing	N/A	

General election 1938: Jeppes
Party	Candidate	Votes	%	±%
United	Bertha Solomon	2,477	43.0	New
Labour	J. D. F. Briggs	2,184	37.9	+3.9
Purified National	N. J. van Schalkwyk	1,059	18.4	New
Rejected ballots		45	0.7	N/A
Majority		293	5.1	N/A
Turnout		5,765	69.3	+13.1
United gain from Roos		Swing	N/A	

=== Elections in the 1940s ===
General election 1943: Jeppes
Party	Candidate	Votes	%	±%
United	Bertha Solomon	4,833	71.0	+37.7
Reunited National	H. J. Waldeck	1,237	18.2	−0.3
Independent	E. S. Sachs	475	7.0	New
Afrikaner	W. H. Immelman	261	3.8	−34.4
Majority		3,596	52.8	N/A
Turnout		6,806	69.2	−0.1
United hold		Swing	+19.0	
