= Bethal (House of Assembly of South Africa constituency) =

- Former constituency for the South African House of Assembly
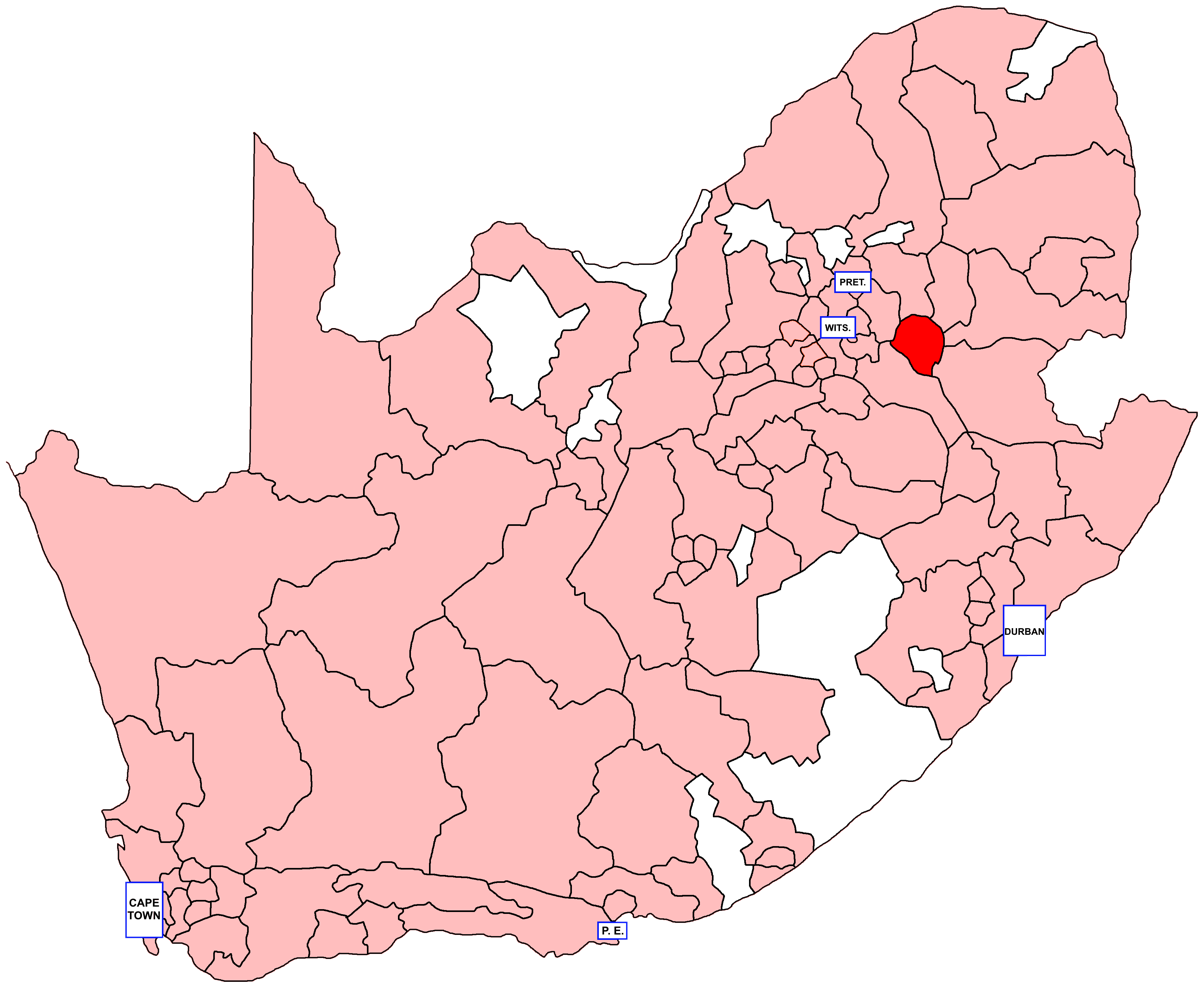
- Location of Bethal within South Africa (1981)
- Province: Transvaal
- Electorate: 18,092 (1989)

Former constituency
- Created: 1915
- Abolished: 1994
- Number of members: 1
- Last MHA: C. D. de Jager (CP)
- Replaced by: Mpumalanga

Bethal, known between 1948 and 1966 as Bethal-Middelburg, was a constituency in the Transvaal Province of South Africa, which existed from 1915 to 1994. Named after the town of Bethal, it covered a rural area in the eastern Transvaal. Throughout its existence it elected one member to the House of Assembly and one to the Transvaal Provincial Council.

== Franchise notes ==
When the Union of South Africa was formed in 1910, the electoral qualifications in use in each pre-existing colony were kept in place. In the Transvaal Colony, and its predecessor the South African Republic, the vote was restricted to white men, and as such, elections in the Transvaal Province were held on a whites-only franchise from the beginning. The franchise was also restricted by property and education qualifications until the 1933 general election, following the passage of the Women's Enfranchisement Act, 1930 and the Franchise Laws Amendment Act, 1931. From then on, the franchise was given to all white citizens aged 21 or over. Non-whites remained disenfranchised until the end of apartheid and the introduction of universal suffrage in 1994.

== History ==
Like most of the rural Transvaal, Bethal had a largely Afrikaans-speaking electorate. In its early years, it was a marginal seat with a slight lean towards the South African Party, whose leader Jan Smuts was popular in the Transvaal. In 1929, it was briefly held by Tielman Roos for the National Party - however, he resigned the following year due to a health scare and the SAP retook the seat. They (and their successors the United Party) held it until 1948, at which Bethal was one of many rural seats to fall to the Herenigde Nasionale Party-led coalition. In Bethal's case, their new MP was elected for the allied Afrikaner Party, but joined the NP shortly thereafter, and the governing party would hold Bethal for the next forty years. In 1987, again like many other rural Transvaal seats, it fell to Andries Treurnicht's hardline Conservative Party, which held it until the end of apartheid.

== Members ==
Election	Member	Party
1915	H. S. Grobler	South African
1920	H. S. Grobler	South African
1921	H. S. Grobler	South African
1924	H. S. Grobler	South African
1929	Tielman Roos	National
1930 by	J. P. Jooste	South African
1933	J. P. Jooste	South African
1934	J. P. Jooste	United
1938	J. P. Jooste	United
1939 by	C. J. van den Berg	United
1943	J. P. Fourie	United
1948	J. T. Bezuidenhout	Afrikaner
1953	J. T. Bezuidenhout	National
1958	J. T. Bezuidenhout	National
1961 by	J. W. Rall	National
1961	J. W. Rall	National
1966	Greyling Wentzel	National
1970	Greyling Wentzel	National
1974	Greyling Wentzel	National
1977	Greyling Wentzel	National
1981	Greyling Wentzel	National
1987	C. D. de Jager	Conservative
1989	C. D. de Jager	Conservative
1994	Constituency abolished	

== Detailed results ==
=== Elections in the 1910s ===
General election 1915: Bethal
Party	Candidate	Votes	%	±%
South African	H. S. Grobler	1,360	59.7	New
National	J. J. Scheepers	917	40.3	New
Majority		443	19.4	N/A
Turnout		2,277	76.2	N/A
South African win (new seat)				

=== Elections in the 1920s ===
General election 1920: Bethal
Party	Candidate	Votes	%	±%
South African	H. S. Grobler	1,080	60.6	+0.9
National	P. J. D. Erasmus	702	39.4	−0.9
Majority		378	21.2	+1.8
Turnout		1,782	60.4	−15.8
South African hold		Swing	+0.9	

General election 1921: Bethal
Party	Candidate	Votes	%	±%
South African	H. S. Grobler	1,182	57.5	−3.1
National	C. S. Raath	875	42.5	+3.1
Majority		307	15.0	−6.2
Turnout		2,057	64.7	+4.3
South African hold		Swing	-3.1	

General election 1924: Bethal
Party	Candidate	Votes	%	±%
South African	H. S. Grobler	1,079	50.3	−7.2
National	C. S. Raath	1,056	49.3	+6.8
Rejected ballots		8	0.4	N/A
Majority		23	1.0	−14.0
Turnout		2,143	83.3	+18.6
South African hold		Swing	-7.0	

General election 1929: Bethal
Party	Candidate	Votes	%	±%
National	Tielman Roos	1,252	52.0	+2.7
South African	H. S. Grobler	1,145	47.5	−2.8
Rejected ballots		12	0.5	+0.1
Majority		107	4.5	N/A
Turnout		2,409	89.7	+6.4
National gain from South African		Swing	+2.8	

=== Elections in the 1930s ===
Bethal by-election, 22 January 1930
Party	Candidate	Votes	%	±%
South African	J. P. Jooste	1,271	50.9	+3.4
National	G. E. Haupt	1,221	48.9	−3.1
Rejected ballots		6	0.2	-0.9
Majority		50	2.0	N/A
Turnout		2,498	93.8	+4.1
South African gain from National		Swing	+3.3	

General election 1933: Bethal
Party	Candidate	Votes	%	±%
South African	J. P. Jooste	Unopposed		
South African gain from National				

General election 1938: Bethal
Party	Candidate	Votes	%	±%
United	J. P. Jooste	3,180	63.5	N/A
Purified National	W. C. J. Brink	1,795	35.8	New
Rejected ballots		32	0.7	N/A
Majority		1,385	27.7	N/A
Turnout		5,007	89.4	N/A
United hold		Swing	N/A	

Bethal by-election, 22 February 1939
Party	Candidate	Votes	%	±%
United	C. J. van den Berg	2,793	55.0	−8.5
Purified National	J. G. W. van Niekerk	2,247	44.3	+8.5
Rejected ballots		35	0.7	+-0
Majority		546	10.8	−16.9
Turnout		5,075	87.4	−2.0
United hold		Swing	+8.5	
