= Third cabinet of J. B. M. Hertzog =

Third Hertzog Cabinet
- 7th Cabinet of the Union of South Africa (since the 1909 South Africa Act)
- 1933–1938
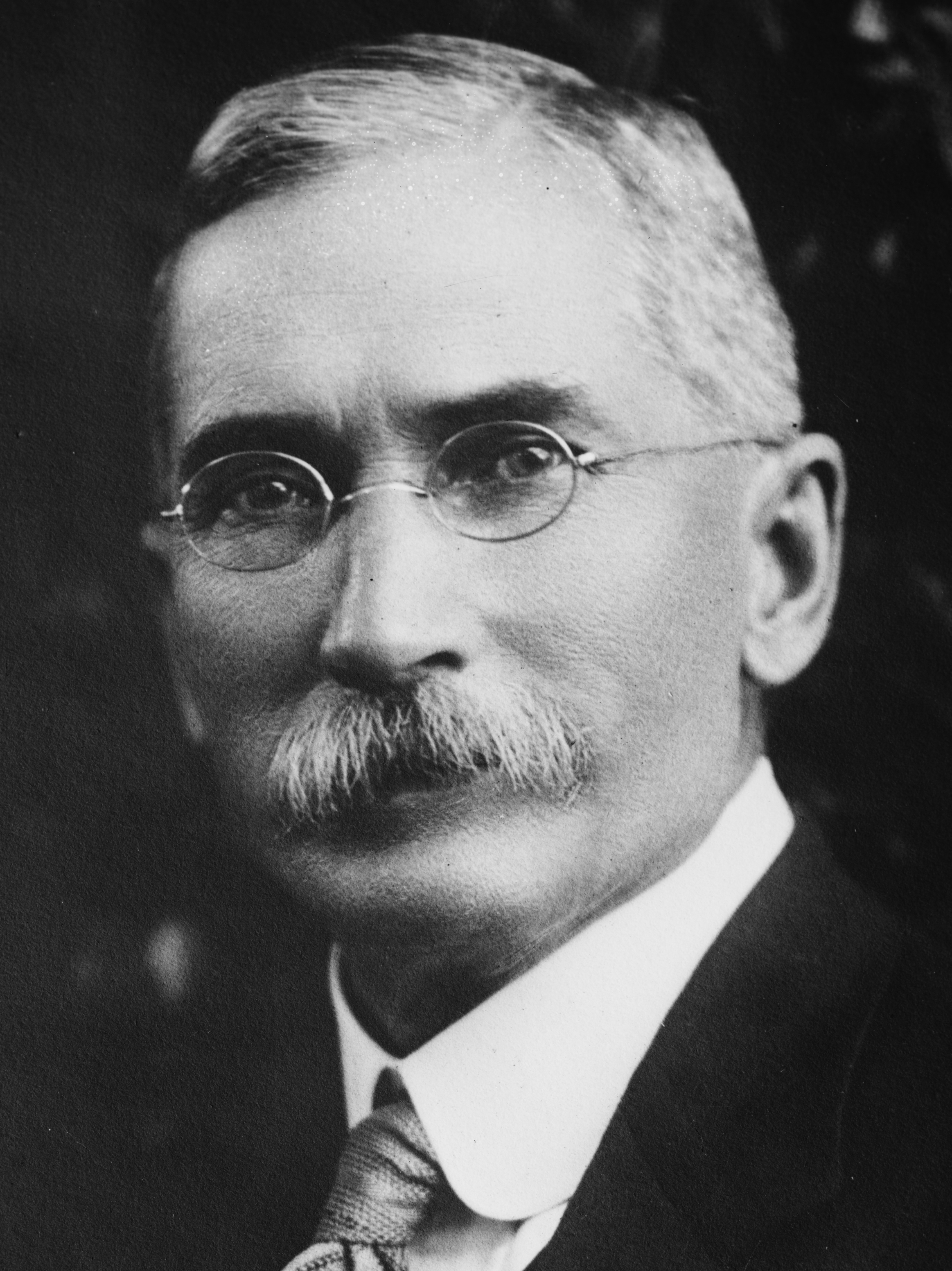
- Barry Hertzog (c. 1920)
- Date formed: 17 May 1933
- Date dissolved: 18 May 1938 (5 years and 1 day)

People and organisations
- Monarch: King George V (1933–1936); King Edward VIII (1936); King George VI
- Governor-General: Earl of Clarendon (until 1937); Sir Patrick Duncan
- Prime Minister: Barry Hertzog
- Member parties: National Party (until 1934); South African Party (until 1934); United Party (from 1934)
- Status in legislature: Coalition
- Opposition parties: South African Party
- Opposition leaders: Jan Smuts

History
- Election: 1933 election
- Predecessor: Hertzog II
- Successor: Hertzog IV

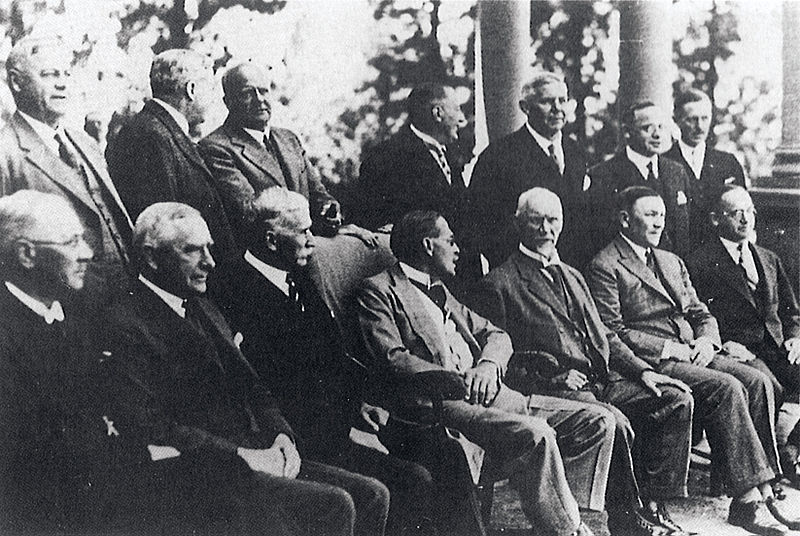
7th Cabinet of the Union of South Africa (c.1933)

The 7th Cabinet of the Union of South Africa, the 3rd formed by General Barry Hertzog, was in power from 17 May 1933 to 18 May 1938.

== Cabinet ==
Post	Minister	Term		Party
Prime Minister	Gen. Barry Hertzog	1933	1938	NP
Minister of External Affairs	Gen. Barry Hertzog	1933	1938	NP
Minister of External Affairs	Gen. Barry Hertzog	1933	1938	UP
Deputy Prime Minister	Gen. Jan Smuts	1933	1938	SAP
Minister of Justice	Gen. Jan Smuts	1933	1938	SAP
Minister of Justice	Gen. Jan Smuts	1933	1938	UP
Minister of Agriculture and Forestry (renamed in 1934 to include Forestry)	The Hon. Jan Kemp MP	1933	1935	NP
Minister of Agriculture and Forestry (renamed in 1934 to include Forestry)	The Hon. Jan Kemp MP	1933	1935	UP
Minister of Commerce and Industry (department split from Mines)	The Hon. Adriaan Fourie MP	1933	1938	NP
Minister of Labour	The Hon. Adriaan Fourie MP	1933	1935	NP
Minister of Labour	The Hon. Adriaan Fourie MP	1933	1935	UP
Minister of Defence	The Hon. Oswald Pirow MP	1933	1938	NP
Minister of Railways and Harbours	The Hon. Oswald Pirow MP	1933	1938	NP
Minister of Railways and Harbours	The Hon. Oswald Pirow MP	1933	1938	UP
Minister of Education	The Hon. J. F. H. Hofmeyer MP	1933	1938	SAP
Minister of Interior Affairs	The Hon. J. F. H. Hofmeyer MP	1933	1936	SAP
Minister of Public Health	The Hon. J. F. H. Hofmeyer MP	1933	1936	SAP
Minister of Public Health	The Hon. J. F. H. Hofmeyer MP	1933	1936	UP
Minister of Finance	The Hon. N. C. Havenga MP	1933	1938	NP
Minister of Finance	The Hon. N. C. Havenga MP	1933	1938	UP
Minister of Lands	The Hon. Deneys Reitz MP	1933	1935	SAP
Minister of Lands	The Hon. Deneys Reitz MP	1933	1935	UP
Minister of Mines (department split from Commerce)	The Hon. Patrick Duncan MP	1933	1936	SAP
Minister of Mines (department split from Commerce)	The Hon. Patrick Duncan MP	1933	1936	UP
Minister of Native Affairs	The Hon. P. G. W. Grobler MP	1933	1938	NP
Minister of Native Affairs	The Hon. P. G. W. Grobler MP	1933	1938	UP
Minister of Posts and Telegraphs	The Hon. C. F. Clarkson MP	1933	1938	NP
Minister of Public Works	The Hon. C. F. Clarkson MP	1933	1938	NP
Minister of Public Works	The Hon. C. F. Clarkson MP	1933	1938	UP
Minister without Portfolio	The Hon. Richard Stuttaford MP	1933	1936	SAP
Minister without Portfolio	The Hon. Richard Stuttaford MP	1933	1936	UP
=== Changes 1935 ===
Post	Minister	Term		Party
Minister of Agriculture and Forestry	The Hon. Deneys Reitz MP	1935	1938	UP
Minister of Labour and Social Welfare (newly-formed)	The Hon. Adriaan Fourie MP	1935	1936	UP
Minister of Lands	The Hon. Jan Kemp MP	1935	1938	UP
=== Changes 1936 ===
Post	Minister	Term		Party
Minister of Interior Affairs	The Hon. Richard Stuttaford MP	1936	1938	UP
Minister of Public Health	The Hon. Richard Stuttaford MP	1936	1938	UP
Minister of Labour and Social Welfare	The Hon. J. F. H. Hofmeyer MP	1936	1937	UP
Minister of Mines	The Hon. J. F. H. Hofmeyer MP	1936	1938	UP
Minister without Portfolio	The Hon. F. C. Sturrock MP	1936	1938	UP
=== Changes 1937 ===
Post	Minister	Term		Party
Minister of Labour	The Hon. J. F. H. Hofmeyer MP	1937	1938	UP
Minister of Social Welfare	The Hon. J. F. H. Hofmeyer MP	1937	1938	UP

== Sources ==
- "Geocities – South Africa". Geocities (Web Archive). Archived from the original on 16 October 2007.
