= Second cabinet of J. B. M. Hertzog =

Second Hertzog Cabinet
- 6th Cabinet of the Union of South Africa (since the 1909 South Africa Act)
- 1929–1933
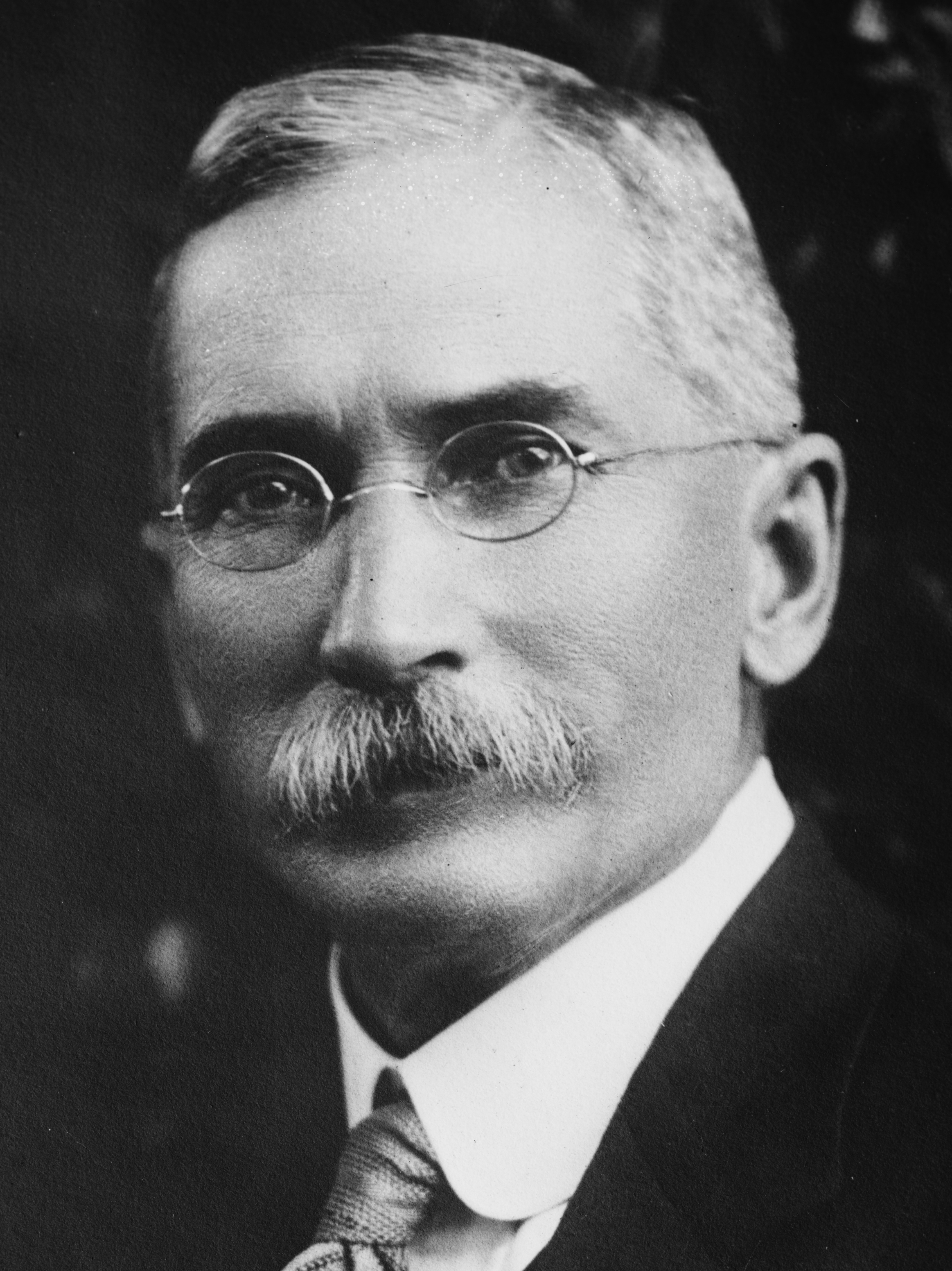
- Barry Hertzog (c. 1920)
- Date formed: 14 June 1929
- Date dissolved: 17 May 1933 (3 years, 11 months and 3 days)

People and organisations
- Monarch: King George V
- Governor-General: Earl of Athlone (until 1930); Earl of Clarendon
- Prime Minister: Barry Hertzog
- Member parties: National Party; Labour Party
- Status in legislature: Coalition
- Opposition parties: South African Party
- Opposition leaders: Jan Smuts

History
- Election: 1929 election
- Predecessor: Hertzog I
- Successor: Hertzog III

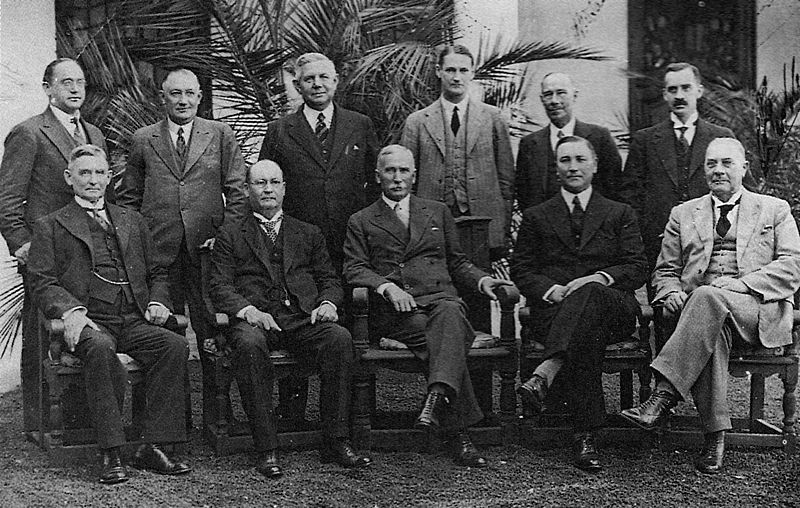
(c.1929) Front (left to right): Frederic Creswell, D. F. Malan, J. B. M. Hertzog, N. C. Havenga, and P. G. W. Grobler. Back (left to right): Oswald Pirow, Jan Kemp, Adriaan Fourie, E. G. Jansen, Henry Sampson, and C. Malan.

== Cabinet ==
Post	Minister	Term		Party
Prime Minister	Gen. Barry Hertzog	1929	1933	NP
Minister of External Affairs	Gen. Barry Hertzog	1929	1933	NP
Minister of Agriculture	The Hon. Jan Kemp MP	1929	1933	NP
Minister of Defence	The Hon. Frederic Creswell MP	1929	1933	Labour
Minister of Labour	The Hon. Frederic Creswell MP	1929	1933	Labour
Minister of Education	The Hon. Daniël Malan MP	1929	1933	NP
Minister of Interior Affairs	The Hon. Daniël Malan MP	1929	1933	NP
Minister of Public Health	The Hon. Daniël Malan MP	1929	1933	NP
Minister of Finance	The Hon. N. C. Havenga MP	1929	1933	NP
Minister of Irrigation	The Hon. Ernest Jansen MP	1929	1933	NP
Minister of Native Affairs	The Hon. Ernest Jansen MP	1929	1933	NP
Minister of Justice	The Hon. Oswald Pirow MP	1929	1933	NP
Minister of Lands	The Hon. P. G. W. Grobler MP	1924	1933	NP
Minister of Mines and Industry	The Hon. Adriaan Fourie MP	1929	1933APJ	NP
Minister of Posts and Telegraphs	The Hon. H. W. Sampson MP	1928	1929	Labour
Minister of Public Works	The Hon. H. W. Sampson MP	1928	1929	Labour
Minister of Railways and Harbours	The Hon. Charles Malan MP	1929	1933	NP

== Sources ==
- "Geocities – South Africa". Geocities (Web Archive). Archived from the original on 16 October 2007.
