= Rustenburg (House of Assembly of South Africa constituency) =

- Former constituency for the South African House of Assembly
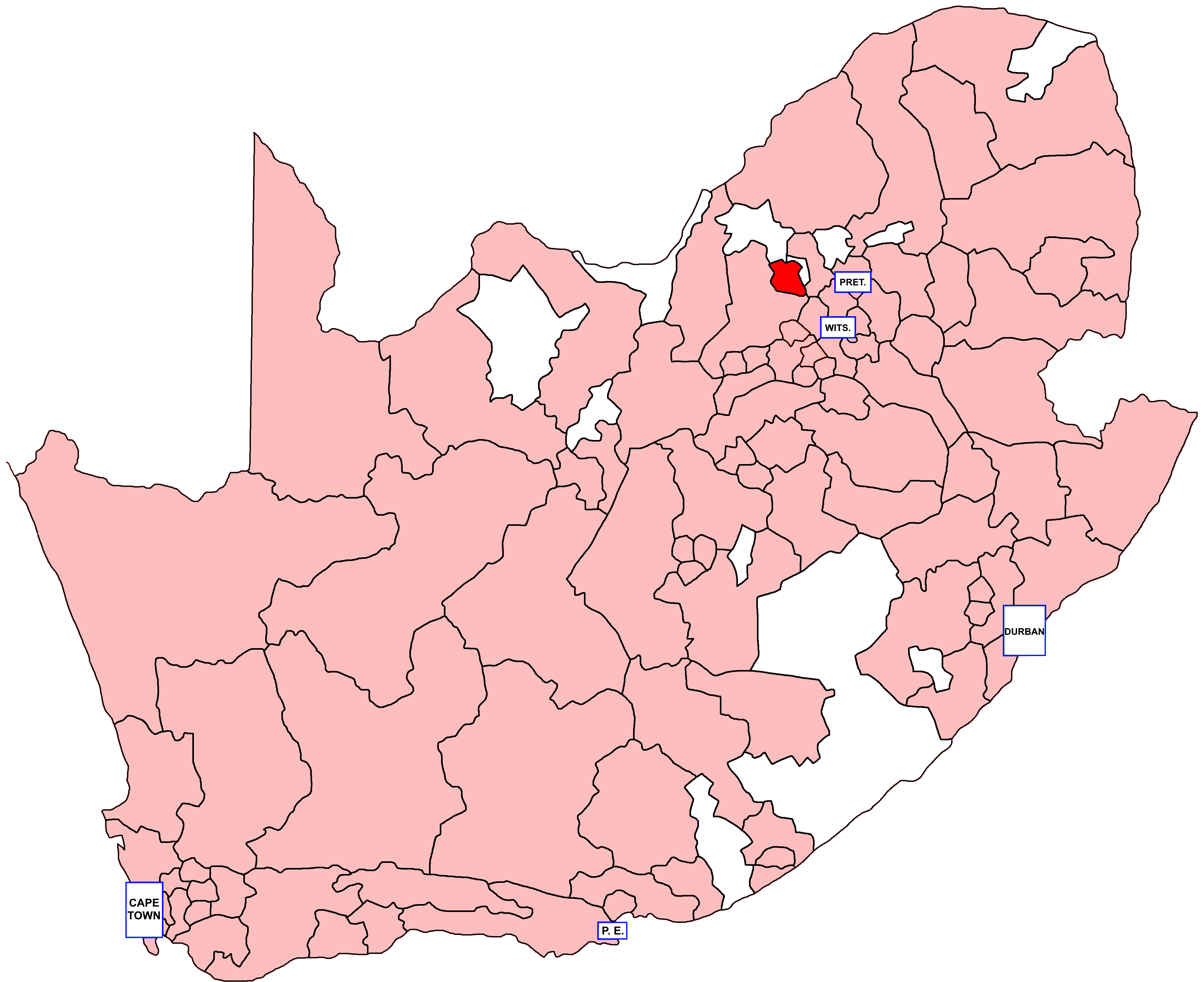
- Location of Rustenburg within South Africa (1981)
- Province: Transvaal
- Electorate: 24,094 (1989)

Former constituency
- Created: 1910
- Abolished: 1994
- Number of members: 1
- Last MHA: Willie Botha (CP)
- Replaced by: North West

Rustenburg was a constituency in the Transvaal Province of South Africa, which existed from 1910 to 1994. It covered a rural area in the western Transvaal centred on the town of Rustenburg. Throughout its existence it elected one member to the House of Assembly and one to the Transvaal Provincial Council.

== Franchise notes ==
When the Union of South Africa was formed in 1910, the electoral qualifications in use in each pre-existing colony were kept in place. In the Transvaal Colony, and its predecessor the South African Republic, the vote was restricted to white men, and as such, elections in the Transvaal Province were held on a whites-only franchise from the beginning. The franchise was also restricted by property and education qualifications until the 1933 general election, following the passage of the Women's Enfranchisement Act, 1930 and the Franchise Laws Amendment Act, 1931. From then on, the franchise was given to all white citizens aged 21 or over. Non-whites remained disenfranchised until the end of apartheid and the introduction of universal suffrage in 1994.

== History ==
Rustenburg, like most of the rural Transvaal, had a largely Afrikaans-speaking electorate and was a conservative seat throughout its existence. For much of its history, it was a bellwether, being held by the governing party (or one of the governing parties) in every election from 1910 until 1987, with the exception of 1921. The 1921 general election appeared to go the way of the governing South African Party as well, with official returns showing a one-vote majority, but was overturned on appeal and the seat handed to the National Party candidate, P. G. W. Grobler. Grobler served in cabinet under J. B. M. Hertzog, and followed Hertzog into the United Party in 1934, but retired at the following general election due to poor health.

It fell to the Herenigde Nasionale Party in 1948, alongside many other Transvaal seats, and over the following decades became a safe Government seat. This streak was broken at the final whites-only election in 1989, in which, again like many other seats in the Transvaal, it fell to the Conservative Party. Its final MP, Willie Botha, joined the Freedom Front after the CP decided to boycott the non-racial 1994 general election, and served in the post-apartheid parliament for a single five-year term.

== Members ==
Election	Member	Party
1910	P. G. W. Grobler	Het Volk
1915	B. I. J. van Heerden	South African
1920	H. N. J. van der Merwe	South African
1921	P. G. W. Grobler	National
1924	P. G. W. Grobler	National
1929	P. G. W. Grobler	National
1933	P. G. W. Grobler	National
1934	P. G. W. Grobler	United
1938	J. M. Conradie	United
1943	J. M. Conradie	United
1948	J. H. Fouché	HNP
1953	J. H. Fouché	National
1958	L. J. C. Bootha	National
1961	L. J. C. Bootha	National
1966	Paul Bodenstein	National
1970	Paul Bodenstein	National
1974	Paul Bodenstein	National
1977	Paul Bodenstein	National
1979 by	M. H. Veldman	National
1981	M. H. Veldman	National
1987	M. H. Veldman	National
1989	Willie Botha	Conservative
1994	Constituency abolished	

== Detailed results ==
=== Elections in the 1910s ===
General election 1910: Rustenburg
Party	Candidate	Votes	%	±%
Het Volk	P. G. W. Grobler	Unopposed		
Het Volk win (new seat)				

General election 1915: Rustenburg
Party	Candidate	Votes	%	±%
South African	B. I. J. van Heerden	1,353	61.9	−16.5
National	T. C. Stoffberg	834	38.1	New
Majority		519	23.8	N/A
Turnout		2,187	79.1	N/A
South African hold		Swing	N/A	

=== Elections in the 1920s ===
General election 1920: Rustenburg
Party	Candidate	Votes	%	±%
South African	H. N. J. van der Merwe	1,072	50.8	−11.1
National	P. G. W. Grobler	1,038	49.2	+11.1
Majority		34	1.6	−22.2
Turnout		2,110	69.6	−9.5
South African hold		Swing	-11.1	

General election 1921: Rustenburg
Party	Candidate	Votes	%	±%
South African	H. N. J. van der Merwe	1,151	50.0	−0.8
National	P. G. W. Grobler	1,150	50.0	+0.8
Majority		1	0.0	−1.6
Turnout		2,301	70.5	−0.9
South African hold		Swing	-0.8	

The election was overturned on appeal and Grobler was declared elected.

General election 1924: Rustenburg
Party	Candidate	Votes	%	±%
National	P. G. W. Grobler	1,151	52.7	+2.7
South African	L. A. S. Lemmer	1,021	46.8	−3.2
Rejected ballots		12	0.5	N/A
Majority		130	5.9	N/A
Turnout		2,184	85.1	+14.6
National gain from South African		Swing	+3.0	

General election 1929: Rustenburg
Party	Candidate	Votes	%	±%
National	P. G. W. Grobler	1,304	59.1	+6.4
South African	W. R. F. Teichmann	886	40.2	−6.6
Rejected ballots		16	0.7	+0.2
Majority		418	18.9	+13.0
Turnout		2,206	84.4	−0.7
National hold		Swing	+6.5	

=== Elections in the 1930s ===
General election 1933: Rustenburg
Party	Candidate	Votes	%	±%
National	P. G. W. Grobler	2,466	55.5	−3.6
Roos	Tielman Roos	1,922	43.3	New
Rejected ballots		56	1.2	+0.5
Majority		544	12.2	N/A
Turnout		4,444	79.3	−5.1
National hold		Swing	N/A	

General election 1938: Rustenburg
Party	Candidate	Votes	%	±%
United	J. M. Conradie	2,260	48.3	−7.2
Purified National	N. J. J. Combrink	1,599	34.2	New
Independent	P. W. C. de Wit	786	16.8	New
Rejected ballots		32	0.7	-0.5
Majority		661	14.1	N/A
Turnout		4,677	87.6	+8.3
United hold		Swing	N/A	
