= Leeubekkie park =

Park in Johannesburg, South Africa

Coordinates: 26.1918°S 28.0113°E

Leeubekkie Park
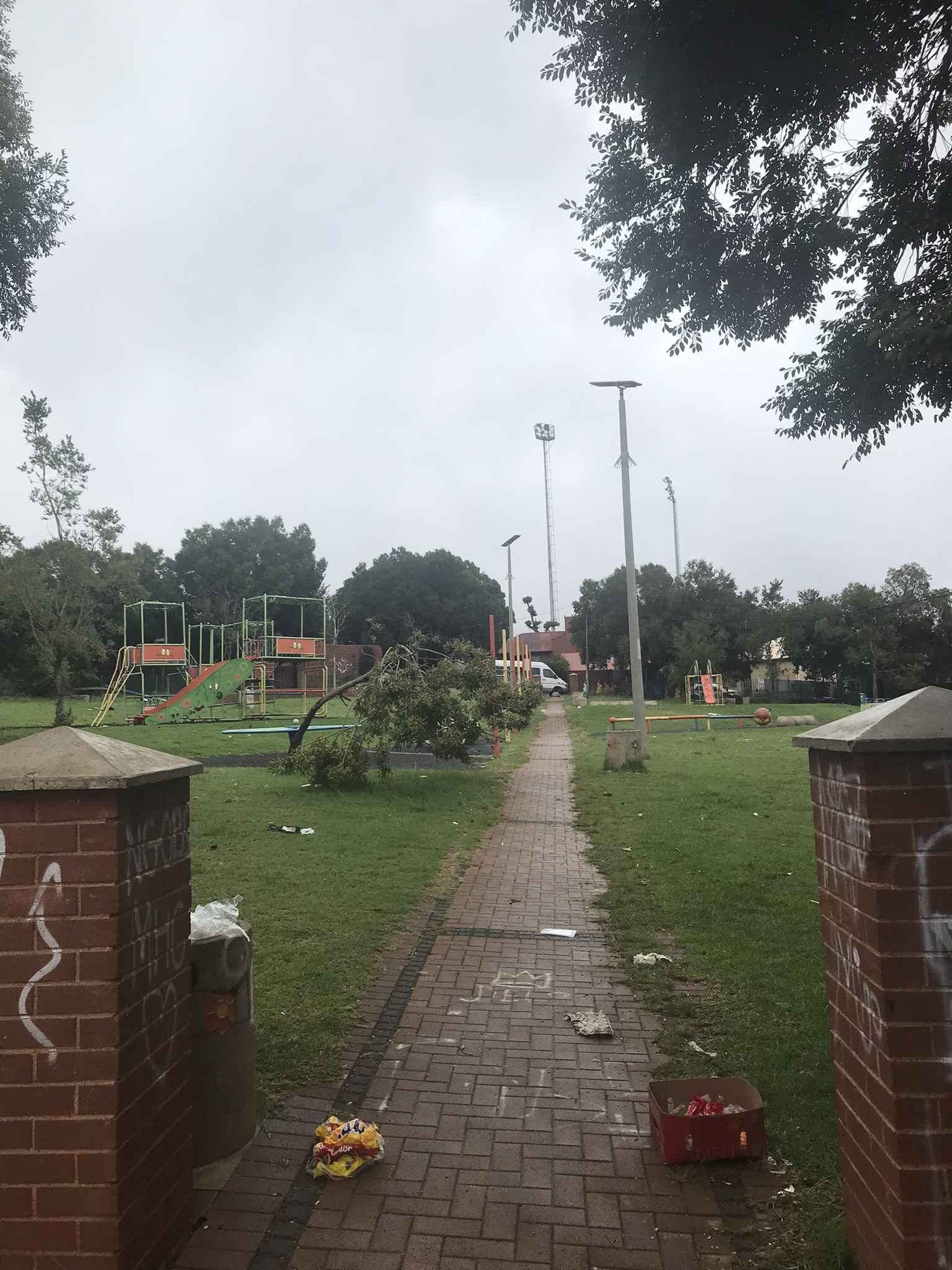
- Park Management
- Interactive map of Leeubekkie Park

Leeubekkie Park is a public park located in the suburb of Jan Hofmeyer in Johannesburg, South Africa. The park is in the centre of a large circle known as Leeubekkie Avenue, from which the park takes its name. The park forms part of the network of community green spaces that is mis-managed by City Parks and Zoo as it struggles to deliver basic services.

== Setting and upkeep ==
Green infrastructure can complement the ‘grey’ infrastructures of cities and since Leeubekkie Avenue is surrounded on three sides by University of Johannesburg Sports Fields an impression of an urban green space is created. This community who live in Jan Hofmeyer, Brixton and Vrededorp benefitted from a park upgrade, as part of a national initiative to improve public open spaces and recreational facilities. In 2019, Leeubekkie Park was recognised at the South African Landscape Institute (SALI) Awards of Excellence, where it received awards in categories related to landscape construction and specialised landscaping. Like Katjiepiering Park, Leeubekkie Park has not been well maintained or kept. A visit to the park will show that this open public space, may once have had improved recreational facilities, but these have deteriorated since municipalities do seem to know how to manage parks and other public facilities.
