= Turffontein (House of Assembly of South Africa constituency) =

- Former constituency for the South African House of Assembly
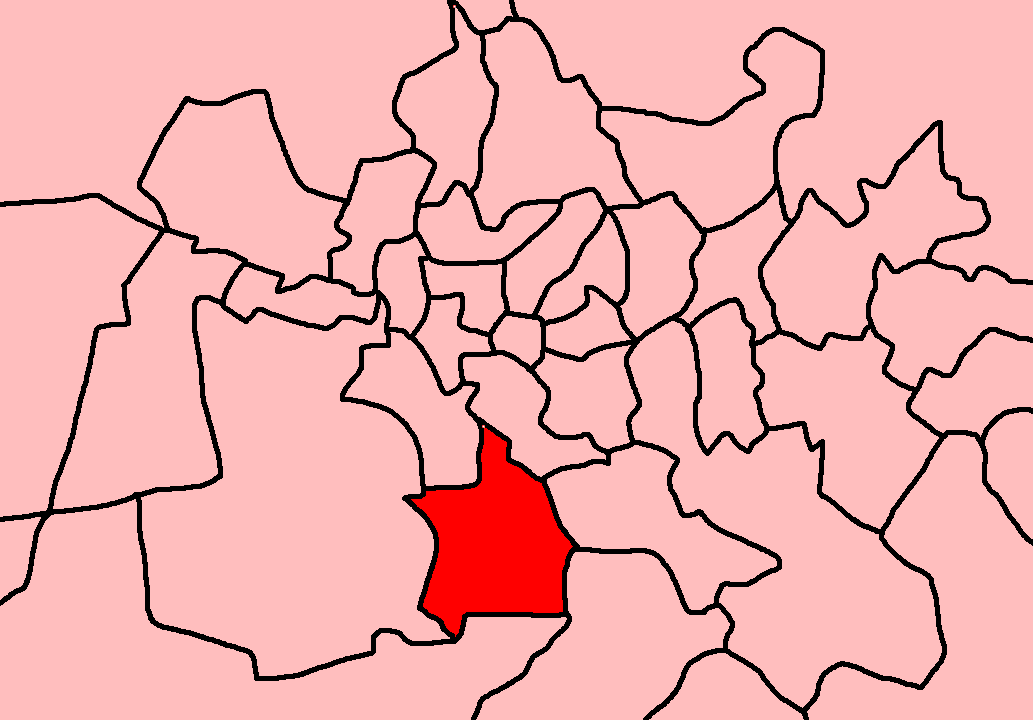
- Location of Turffontein within the Witwatersrand (1981)
- Province: Transvaal
- Electorate: 25,138 (1989)

Former constituency
- Created: 1910
- Abolished: 1994
- Number of members: 1
- Last MHA: André Fourie (NP)
- Replaced by: Gauteng

Turffontein was a constituency in the Transvaal Province of South Africa, which existed from 1910 to 1994. It covered a part of the southern suburbs of Johannesburg centred on the suburb of Turffontein. Throughout its existence it elected one member to the House of Assembly and one to the Transvaal Provincial Council.

== Franchise notes ==
When the Union of South Africa was formed in 1910, the electoral qualifications in use in each pre-existing colony were kept in place. In the Transvaal Colony, and its predecessor the South African Republic, the vote was restricted to white men, and as such, elections in the Transvaal Province were held on a whites-only franchise from the beginning. The franchise was also restricted by property and education qualifications until the 1933 general election, following the passage of the Women's Enfranchisement Act, 1930 and the Franchise Laws Amendment Act, 1931. From then on, the franchise was given to all white citizens aged 21 or over. Non-whites remained disenfranchised until the end of apartheid and the introduction of universal suffrage in 1994.

== History ==
Turffontein was a socioeconomically mixed constituency that went through multiple different phases through its history. After Labour victories in 1920 and 1924, it became a safe United Party seat in the 1930s, with Frederick Sturrock representing the seat for over twenty years and serving in cabinet for a substantial part of that time. The UP continued to hold Turffontein for some time after Sturrock's retirement in 1950, the governing National Party only winning it in 1966 and the UP winning it back with André Fourie in 1970. Fourie had an unusual parliamentary career, losing his seat in 1974 to Marais Steyn of the NP, who had previously been an MP for the United Party before defecting in 1972 over disagreements with Harry Schwarz and the liberal wing of the party. Steyn was appointed ambassador to London in 1980, and was succeeded as MP for Turffontein by André Fourie, who had also defected to the NP in the meantime. Fourie remained the seat's MP until the end of apartheid, served a term in the non-racial National Assembly and finally represented Freedom Front Plus on the Cape Town City Council.

== Members ==
Election	Member	Party
1910	H. A. Wyndham	Unionist
1915	H. A. Wyndham	Unionist
1920	G. B. Steer	Labour
1921	E. W. Hunt	South African
1924	A. C. Fordham	Labour
1929	Frederick Sturrock	South African
1933	Frederick Sturrock	South African
1934	Frederick Sturrock	United
1938	Frederick Sturrock	United
1943	Frederick Sturrock	United
1948	Frederick Sturrock	United
1950 by	R. B. Durrant	United
1953	R. B. Durrant	United
1958	R. B. Durrant	United
1961	R. B. Durrant	United
1966	J. D. Smith	National
1970	André Fourie	United
1974	S. J. M. Steyn	National
1977	S. J. M. Steyn	National
1981	André Fourie	National
1987	André Fourie	National
1989	André Fourie	National
1994	Constituency abolished	

== Detailed results ==
=== Elections in the 1910s ===
General election 1910: Turffontein
Party	Candidate	Votes	%	±%
Unionist	H. A. Wyndham	1,049	53.7	New
Het Volk	R. H. Henderson	905	46.3	New
Majority		144	7.4	N/A
Unionist win (new seat)				

General election 1915: Turffontein
Party	Candidate	Votes	%	±%
Unionist	H. A. Wyndham	1,374	54.3	+0.6
Labour	G. B. Steer	807	31.9	New
National	S. W. van Niekerk	348	13.8	New
Majority		567	22.4	N/A
Turnout		2,529	76.6	N/A
Unionist hold		Swing	N/A	

=== Elections in the 1920s ===
General election 1920: Turffontein
Party	Candidate	Votes	%	±%
Labour	G. B. Steer	831	41.0	+9.1
Unionist	H. A. Wyndham	432	21.3	−33.0
South African	E. W. Hunt	401	19.8	New
National	J. H. L. Schumann	364	17.9	+4.1
Majority		399	19.7	N/A
Turnout		2,028	63.4	−13.2
Labour gain from Unionist		Swing	+21.1	

General election 1921: Turffontein
Party	Candidate	Votes	%	±%
South African	E. W. Hunt	1,209	55.9	+36.1
Labour	G. B. Steer	952	44.1	+3.1
Majority		257	11.8	N/A
Turnout		2,168	68.3	+4.9
South African gain from Labour		Swing	N/A	

General election 1924: Turffontein
Party	Candidate	Votes	%	±%
Labour	A. C. Fordham	1,200	49.3	+5.2
South African	H. Solomon	816	33.5	−22.4
Ind. South African	E. W. Hunt	409	16.8	New
Rejected ballots		8	0.4	N/A
Majority		384	15.8	N/A
Turnout		2,433	80.6	+12.3
Labour gain from South African		Swing	+13.8	

General election 1929: Turffontein
Party	Candidate	Votes	%	±%
South African	Frederick Sturrock	1,343	51.5	+18.0
Labour (Creswell)	A. C. Fordham	1,252	48.0	−1.3
Rejected ballots		14	0.5	+0.1
Majority		91	3.5	N/A
Turnout		2,609	79.1	−1.5
South African gain from Labour		Swing	+9.7	

=== Elections in the 1930s ===
General election 1933: Turffontein
Party	Candidate	Votes	%	±%
South African	Frederick Sturrock	Unopposed		
South African hold				

General election 1938: Turffontein
Party	Candidate	Votes	%	±%
United	Frederick Sturrock	3,142	54.6	New
Labour	J. McPherson	1,224	21.3	New
Purified National	J. P. Pienaar	762	13.2	New
Dominion	W. E. J. Clarke	591	10.3	N/A
Rejected ballots		35	0.6	N/A
Majority		1,918	33.3	N/A
Turnout		5,754	74.1	N/A
United hold		Swing	N/A	
