= First cabinet of J. B. M. Hertzog =

First Hertzog Cabinet
- 5th Cabinet of the Union of South Africa (since the 1909 South Africa Act)
- 1924–1929
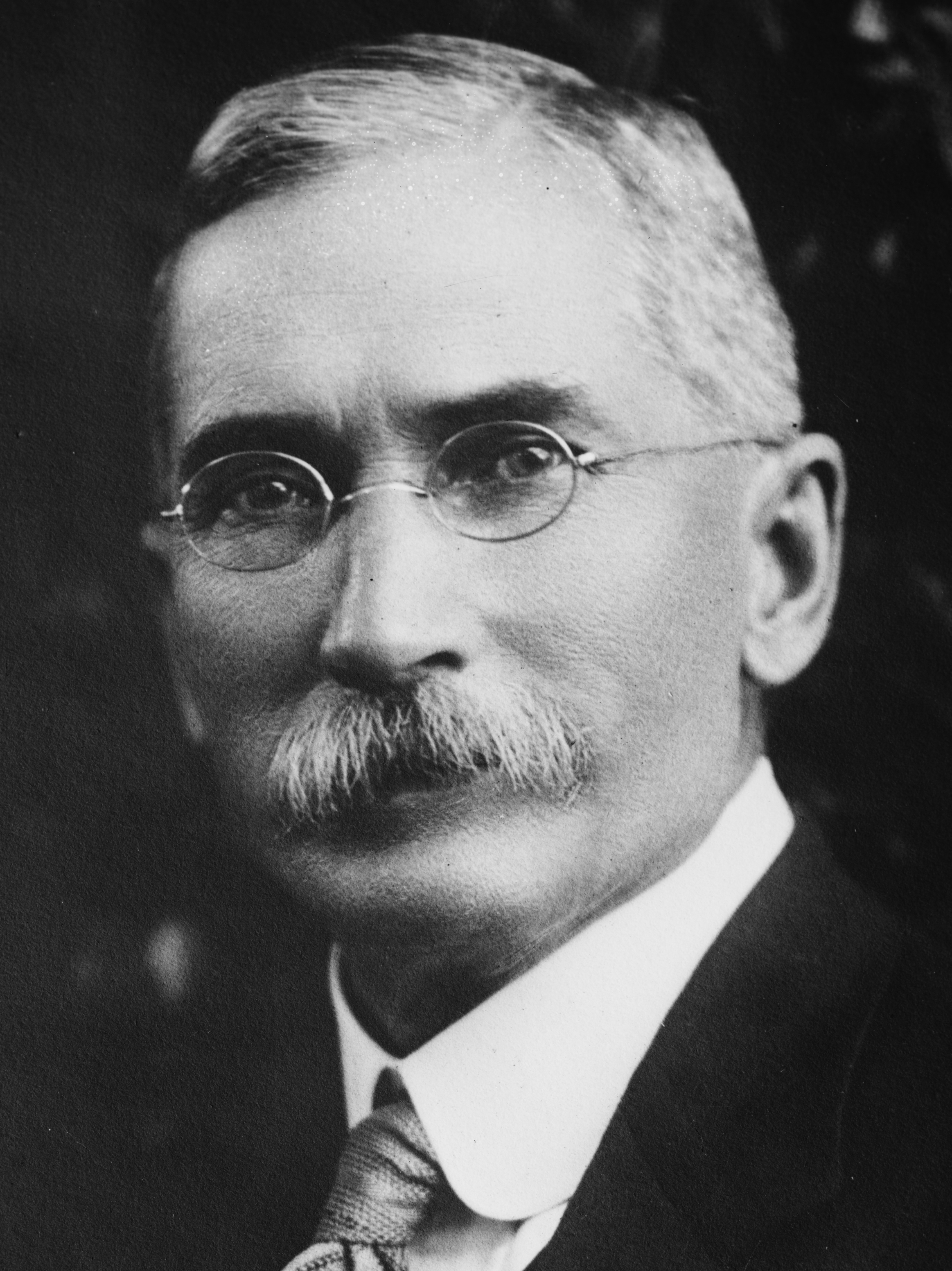
- Barry Hertzog (c. 1920)
- Date formed: 19 June 1924
- Date dissolved: 14 June 1929 (4 years, 11 months and 26 days)

People and organisations
- Monarch: King George V
- Governor-General: Earl of Athlone
- Prime Minister: Barry Hertzog
- Member parties: National Party; Labour Party
- Status in legislature: Coalition
- Opposition parties: South African Party
- Opposition leaders: Jan Smuts

History
- Election: 1924 election
- Predecessor: Smuts II
- Successor: Hertzog II

The First Cabinet of J. B. M. Hertzog was the executive power in South Africa from June 1924 to June 1929. It was also known as the pact government, due to the inclusion of at least two members of the Labour Party in a coalition.

== Cabinet ==
Post	Minister	Term		Party
Prime Minister	Gen. Barry Hertzog	1924	1929	NP
Minister of Native Affairs	Gen. Barry Hertzog	1924	1929	NP
Minister of Agriculture	The Hon. Jan Kemp MP	1924	1929	NP
Minister of Defence	The Hon. Frederic Creswell MP	1924	1929	Labour
Minister of Labour	The Hon. Frederic Creswell MP	1924	1925	Labour
Minister of Education	The Hon. Daniël Malan MP	1924	1929	NP
Minister of Interior Affairs	The Hon. Daniël Malan MP	1924	1929	NP
Minister of Public Health	The Hon. Daniël Malan MP	1924	1929	NP
Minister of Finance	The Hon. N. C. Havenga MP	1924	1929	NP
Minister of Justice	The Hon. Tielman Roos MP	1924	1929	NP
Minister of Lands	The Hon. P. G. W. Grobler MP	1924	1929	NP
Minister of Mines and Industry	The Hon. F. W. Beyers MP	1924	1929	NP
Minister of Posts and Telegraphs	The Hon. Thomas Boydell MP	1924	1925	Labour
Minister of Public Works	The Hon. Thomas Boydell MP	1924	1925	Labour
Minister of Railways and Harbours	The Hon. Charl W. Malan MP	1924	1929	NP
=== Changes 1925 ===
Post	Minister	Term		Party
Minister of Labour	The Hon. Thomas Boydell MP	1925	1929	Labour
Minister of Posts and Telegraphs	The Hon. Walter Madeley MP	1925	1928	Labour
Minister of Public Works	The Hon. Walter Madeley MP	1925	1928	Labour
=== Changes 1927 === Department of External Affairs established
Post	Minister	Term		Party
Minister of External Affairs	Gen. Barry Hertzog	1927	1929	NP
=== Changes 1928 ===
Post	Minister	Term		Party
Minister of Irrigation	The Hon. Ernest Jansen MP	1928	1929	NP
Minister of Posts and Telegraphs	The Hon. H. W. Sampson MP	1928	1929	Labour
Minister of Public Works	The Hon. H. W. Sampson MP	1928	1929	Labour

== Sources ==
- "Geocities – South Africa". Geocities (Web Archive). Archived from the original on 16 October 2007.
