= Durban Stamford Hill (House of Assembly of South Africa constituency) =

- Former constituency for the South African House of Assembly
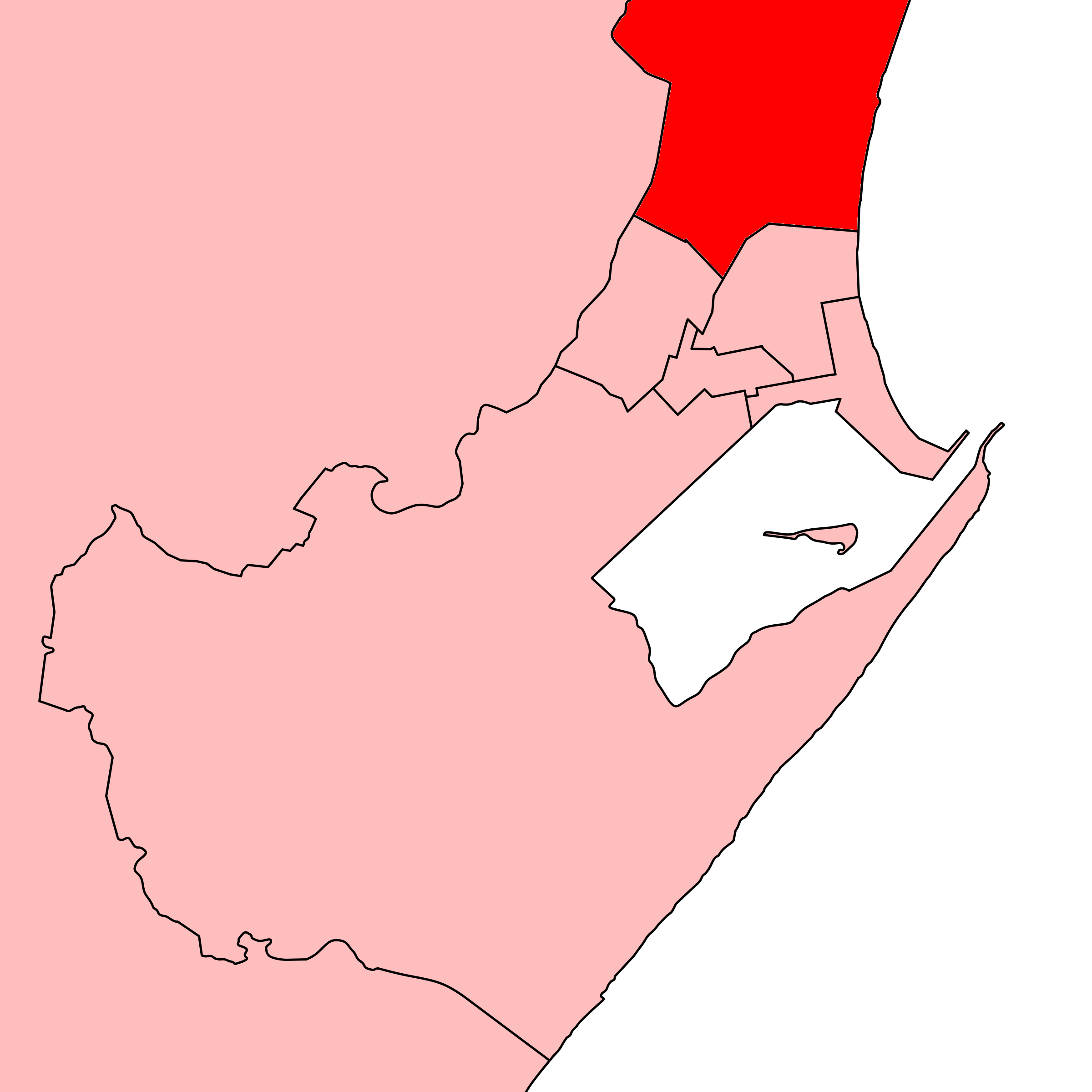
- Location of Durban Stamford Hill within Durban (1920)
- Province: Natal
- Electorate: 7,293 (1938)

Former constituency
- Created: 1920
- Abolished: 1943
- Number of members: 1
- Last MHA: F. H. Acutt (Dom)
- Created from: Durban Greyville
- Replaced by: Durban Musgrave

Durban Stamford Hill was a constituency in the Natal Province of South Africa, which existed from 1920 to 1943. It covered portions of Durban's northern suburbs, centred on the Stamford Hill area. Throughout its existence it elected one member to the House of Assembly.

== Franchise notes ==
When the Union of South Africa was formed in 1910, the electoral qualifications in use in each pre-existing colony were kept in place. The franchise used in the Natal Colony, while theoretically not restricted by race, was significantly less liberal than that of the Cape, and no more than a few hundred non-white electors ever qualified. In 1908, an estimated 200 of the 22,786 electors in the colony were of non-European descent, and by 1935, only one remained. By 1958, when the last non-white voters in the Cape were taken off the rolls, Natal too had an all-white electorate. The franchise was also restricted by property and education qualifications until the 1933 general election, following the passage of the Women's Enfranchisement Act, 1930 and the Franchise Laws Amendment Act, 1931. From then on, the franchise was given to all white citizens aged 21 or over, which remained the case until the end of apartheid and the introduction of universal suffrage in 1994.

== History ==
Like the rest of Durban, Stamford Hill was a largely English-speaking seat. Its first MP, John George Hunter of the Unionist Party, had previously represented the rural constituency of Victoria County, and joined the South African Party in 1921 when the Unionists merged with them. In 1922, Hunter left parliament, and the resulting by-election saw Frederic Creswell, leader of the Labour Party, return to parliament after losing his seat in Troyeville at the previous year's general election. Creswell returned to the Witwatersrand for the next general election, standing for and winning the Denver constituency, and Stamford Hill returned to the SAP with Frederick James Lennox. In 1929, Charles Phineas Robinson, MP for the abolished seat of Durban Central, moved to Stamford Hill, and represented the seat until his retirement from politics in 1938. At that election, which would turn out to be Stamford Hill's last, United Party candidate Leif Egeland (former MP for Dundee) narrowly lost to Frank Horace Acutt of the Dominion Party, which was composed of pro-British former SAP members who refused to support J. B. M. Hertzog's premiership. Acutt represented Stamford Hill until its abolition in 1943, at which point he moved to the new constituency of Musgrave and was re-elected unopposed.

== Members ==
Election	Member	Party
1920	J. G. Hunter	Unionist
1921	J. G. Hunter	South African
1922 by	Frederic Creswell	Labour
1924	F. J. Lennox	South African
1929	C. P. Robinson	South African
1933	C. P. Robinson	South African
1934	C. P. Robinson	United
1938	F. H. Acutt	Dominion
1943	Constituency abolished	

== Detailed results ==
=== Elections in the 1920s ===
General election 1920: Durban Stamford Hill
Party	Candidate	Votes	%	±%
Unionist	J. G. Hunter	689	50.7	New
Labour	H. H. Kemp	670	49.3	New
Majority		19	1.4	N/A
Turnout		1,359	55.5	N/A
Unionist win (new seat)				

General election 1921: Durban Stamford Hill
Party	Candidate	Votes	%	±%
South African	J. G. Hunter	1,021	62.9	+12.2
Labour	H. H. Kemp	602	37.1	−12.2
Majority		419	25.8	+24.4
Turnout		1,623	60.0	+4.5
South African hold		Swing	+12.2	

Durban Stamford Hill by-election, 5 July 1922
Party	Candidate	Votes	%	±%
Labour	Frederic Creswell	827	50.2	+13.1
South African	J. S. Wylie	814	49.5	−13.4
Rejected ballots		5	0.3	N/A
Majority		13	0.8	N/A
Turnout		1,646	77.2	+17.2
Labour gain from South African		Swing	+13.3	

General election 1924: Durban Stamford Hill
Party	Candidate	Votes	%	±%
South African	F. J. Lennox	1,206	57.7	−5.2
Labour	A. Eaton	880	42.1	+5.0
Rejected ballots		5	0.2	N/A
Majority		326	15.6	−10.2
Turnout		1,623	60.0	+4.5
South African hold		Swing	-5.1	

General election 1929: Durban Stamford Hill
Party	Candidate	Votes	%	±%
South African	F. J. Lennox	Unopposed		
South African hold				

=== Elections in the 1930s ===
General election 1933: Durban Stamford Hill
Party	Candidate	Votes	%	±%
South African	C. P. Robinson	2,763	65.4	N/A
Natal Home Rule Party	R. M. McKenzie	1,442	34.1	New
Rejected ballots		23	0.5	N/A
Majority		1,321	31.2	N/A
Turnout		4,228	63.0	N/A
South African hold		Swing	N/A	

General election 1938: Durban Stamford Hill
Party	Candidate	Votes	%	±%
Dominion	F. H. Acutt	3,004	51.3	New
United	Leif Egeland	2,703	46.1	−19.3
Labour	H. H. S. Dold	111	1.9	N/A
Rejected ballots		43	0.7	+0.2
Majority		301	5.1	N/A
Turnout		5,861	80.4	+17.4
Dominion gain from United		Swing	N/A	
