= Somerset East (House of Assembly of South Africa constituency) =

South African constituency, 1910–1981

- Somerset-Oos
- Former constituency for the South African House of Assembly
- Province: Cape of Good Hope
- Electorate: 11,248 (1977)

Former constituency
- Created: 1910
- Abolished: 1981
- Number of members: 1
- Last MHA: S. J. H. van der Spuy (NP)

Somerset East (Afrikaans: Somerset-Oos; known until 1938 simply as Somerset) was a constituency in the Cape Province of South Africa, which existed from 1910 to 1981. It covered a rural area of the Eastern Cape centred on the town of Somerset East. Throughout its existence it elected one member to the House of Assembly and one to the Cape Provincial Council.

== Franchise notes ==
When the Union of South Africa was formed in 1910, the electoral qualifications in use in each pre-existing colony were kept in place. The Cape Colony had implemented a “colour-blind” franchise known as the Cape Qualified Franchise, which included all adult literate men owning more than £75 worth of property (controversially raised from £25 in 1892), and this initially remained in effect after the colony became the Cape Province. As of 1908, 22,784 out of 152,221 electors in the Cape Colony were “Native or Coloured”. Eligibility to serve in Parliament and the Provincial Council, however, was restricted to whites from 1910 onward.

The first challenge to the Cape Qualified Franchise came with the Women's Enfranchisement Act, 1930 and the Franchise Laws Amendment Act, 1931, which extended the vote to women and removed property qualifications for the white population only – non-white voters remained subject to the earlier restrictions. In 1936, the Representation of Natives Act removed all black voters from the common electoral roll and introduced three “Native Representative Members”, white MPs elected by the black voters of the province and meant to represent their interests in particular. A similar provision was made for Coloured voters with the Separate Representation of Voters Act, 1951, and although this law was challenged by the courts, it went into effect in time for the 1958 general election, which was thus held with all-white voter rolls for the first time in South African history. The all-white franchise would continue until the end of apartheid and the introduction of universal suffrage in 1994.

== History ==
Like many rural constituencies across the Cape, Somerset East was a conservative seat with a largely Afrikaans-speaking electorate. Aside from the first decade after unification, the seat was held throughout its existence by the National Party. L. J. Vosloo, first elected in 1926, was one of the 19 Nationalist MPs who joined D. F. Malan’s Purified National Party, and stayed in office until 1953. By then, the seat was thoroughly safe for the NP, which held it unopposed for the last decade of its existence.

== Members ==
Election	Member	Party
1910	A. J. Vosloo	South African
1915	Andries Stockenström	South African
1920	A. P. J. Fourie	National
1921	A. P. J. Fourie	National
1924	A. P. J. Fourie	National
1926 by	L. J. Vosloo	National
1929	L. J. Vosloo	National
1933	L. J. Vosloo	National
1934	L. J. Vosloo	GNP
1938	L. J. Vosloo	GNP
1943	L. J. Vosloo	HNP
1948	L. J. Vosloo	HNP
1953	A. H. Vosloo	National
1958	A. H. Vosloo	National
1961	A. H. Vosloo	National
1966	A. H. Vosloo	National
1970	S. J. H. van der Spuy	National
1974	S. J. H. van der Spuy	National
1977	S. J. H. van der Spuy	National
1981	constituency abolished	

== Detailed results ==
=== Elections in the 1910s ===
General election 1910: Somerset
Party	Candidate	Votes	%	±%
South African	A. J. Vosloo	Unopposed		
South African win (new seat)				

General election 1915: Somerset
Party	Candidate	Votes	%	±%
South African	Andries Stockenström	1,398	52.2	N/A
National	H. J. Moolman	1,278	47.8	New
Majority		120	4.4	N/A
Turnout		2,676	86.7	N/A
South African hold		Swing	N/A	

=== Elections in the 1920s ===
General election 1920: Somerset
Party	Candidate	Votes	%	±%
National	A. P. J. Fourie	1,630	56.6	+8.8
South African	Andries Stockenström	1,250	43.4	−8.8
Majority		380	13.2	N/A
Turnout		2,880	79.6	−7.1
National gain from South African		Swing	+8.8	

General election 1921: Somerset
Party	Candidate	Votes	%	±%
National	A. P. J. Fourie	1,631	54.7	−1.9
South African	P. J. J. Coetzee	1,351	45.3	+1.9
Majority		280	9.4	−3.8
Turnout		2,982	78.1	−1.5
National hold		Swing	-1.9	

General election 1924: Somerset
Party	Candidate	Votes	%	±%
National	A. P. J. Fourie	1,930	60.6	+5.9
South African	T. W. Bell	1,234	38.8	−6.5
Rejected ballots		20	0.6	N/A
Majority		696	21.8	+12.4
Turnout		3,184	83.0	+4.9
National hold		Swing	+6.2	

Somerset by-election, 4 February 1926
Party	Candidate	Votes	%	±%
National	L. J. Vosloo	Unopposed		
National hold				

General election 1929: Somerset
Party	Candidate	Votes	%	±%
National	L. J. Vosloo	1,617	61.0	+0.4
South African	A. B. Hobson	1,008	38.0	−0.8
Rejected ballots		25	1.0	+0.4
Majority		609	23.0	+1.2
Turnout		2,650	82.5	−0.2
National hold		Swing	+0.6	

=== Elections in the 1930s ===
General election 1933: Somerset
Party	Candidate	Votes	%	±%
National	L. J. Vosloo	Unopposed		
National hold				

General election 1938: Somerset East
Party	Candidate	Votes	%	±%
National	L. J. Vosloo	3,164	54.5	N/A
United	G. H. I Rood	2,597	44.7	New
Rejected ballots		44	0.8	N/A
Majority		567	9.8	N/A
Turnout		5,805	90.0	N/A
Purified National hold		Swing	N/A	
