= Minister of Employment and Labour =

South African cabinet position

South Africa Minister of Employment and Labour
- List: 10 other official names: Minister van Arbeid (Afrikaans); uNgqongqotjhe wezabaSebenzi (Southern Ndebele); UMphathiswa lezaBasebenzi (Xhosa); Indvuna Wezabasebenzi (Zulu); Indvuna Letetisebenti (Swazi); Tona ya Bašomi (Northern Sotho); Letona la tsa Mesebetsi (Sotho); Tona la Bodiri (Tswana); Holobye ya Vatirhi (Tsonga); Minisiṱa wa Mishumo (Venda)
- Flag of South Africa
- Incumbent; Nomakhosazana Meth since 3 July 2024
- Department of Employment and Labour
- Style: The Honourable
- Appointer: Cyril Ramaphosa
- Inaugural holder: Frederic Creswell
- Formation: 19 June 1924; 102 years ago
- Deputy: Judith Nemadzinga-Tshabalala; Jomo Sibiya
- Salary: R 2,211,937
- Website: Department of Labour

The Minister of Employment and Labour is a minister in the Cabinet of South Africa. They are responsible for leading the Department of Employment and Labour, which oversees employment, Industrial relations, unemployment, job creation, and other related matters.

The current Minister is Nomakhosazana Meth of the ANC, who has served in the role since July 2024.

== List of past ministers ==
=== Labour, 1924–1935 ===
Name	Portrait	Term		Party	Prime Minister
Frederic Creswell		19 June 1924	1925	LP	J.B.M. Hertzog (I) (II)
Thomas Boydell		1925	14 June 1929	LP	J.B.M. Hertzog (I) (II)
Frederic Creswell		14 June 1929	17 May 1933	LP	J.B.M. Hertzog (I) (II)
Adriaan Fourie		17 May 1933	1935	UP	J.B.M. Hertzog (III)

=== Labour and social welfare, 1935–1937 ===
Name	Portrait	Term		Party	Prime Minister
Adriaan Fourie		1935	1936	UP	J.B.M. Hertzog (III)
J.F.H. Hofmeyer		1936	1937	UP	J.B.M. Hertzog (III)

=== Labour, 1937–1976 ===
Name	Portrait	Term		Party	Prime Minister
J.F.H. Hofmeyer		1937	18 May 1938	UP	J.B.M. Hertzog (III) (IV)
Harry Lawrence		18 May 1938	5 September 1939	UP	J.B.M. Hertzog (III) (IV)
Walter Madeley		5 September 1939	1945	LP	Jan Smuts (takes office after Hertzog resignation)
Walter Madeley		5 September 1939	1945	LP	Jan Smuts (III)
C.F. Steyn		1945	26 May 1948	UP	Jan Smuts (III)
B.J. Schoeman		26 May 1948	1954	HNP	D.F. Malan (I) (II)
Jan de Klerk		1954	8 October 1961	HNP	D.F. Malan (I) (II)
Jan de Klerk		1954	8 October 1961	NP	Strydom (I)
Jan de Klerk		1954	8 October 1961	NP	Hendrik Verwoerd (takes office after Strydom's death)
A.E. Trollip		8 October 1961	30 March 1966	NP	Hendrik Verwoerd (I) (II)
Marais Viljoen		30 March 1966	1976	NP	Hendrik Verwoerd (I) (II)
Marais Viljoen		30 March 1966	1976	NP	B.J. Vorster (takes office after Verwoerd's death)
Marais Viljoen		30 March 1966	1976	NP	B.J. Vorster (I) (II)

=== Manpower utilisation, 1976–1994 ===
Name	Portrait	Term		Party	President (since 1984)
S.P. Botha		1976	15 November 1983	NP	B.J. Vorster (II) (III)
S.P. Botha		1976	15 November 1983	NP	P.W. Botha (I) (II)
Unknown		15 November 1983	6 September 1989		P.W. Botha (I) (II)
Gene Louw		6 September 1989	1992	NP	F.W. de Klerk (I)
Unknown		1992	10 May 1994		F.W. de Klerk (I)

=== Labour, 1994–2019 ===
Name	Portrait	Term		Party	President
Tito Mboweni		10 May 1994	14 June 1999	ANC	Nelson Mandela (Government of National Unity)
Membathisi Mdladlana		14 June 1999	30 October 2010	ANC	Thabo Mbeki (I) (II)
Membathisi Mdladlana		14 June 1999	30 October 2010	ANC	Kgalema Motlanthe (takes office after Mbeki resigns)
Membathisi Mdladlana		14 June 1999	30 October 2010	ANC	Jacob Zuma (I) (II); Cyril Ramaphosa (I)
Mildred Oliphant		1 November 2010	29 May 2019	ANC	Jacob Zuma (I) (II); Cyril Ramaphosa (I)

=== Employment and Labour, 2019–present ===
Name	Portrait	Term		Party	President
Thulas Nxesi		30 May 2019	19 June 2024	ANC	Cyril Ramaphosa (II)
Nomakhosazana Meth		3 July 2024	Present	ANC	Cyril Ramaphosa (II)
