= Durban Greyville (House of Assembly of South Africa constituency) =

- Durban-Greyville
- Former constituency for the South African House of Assembly
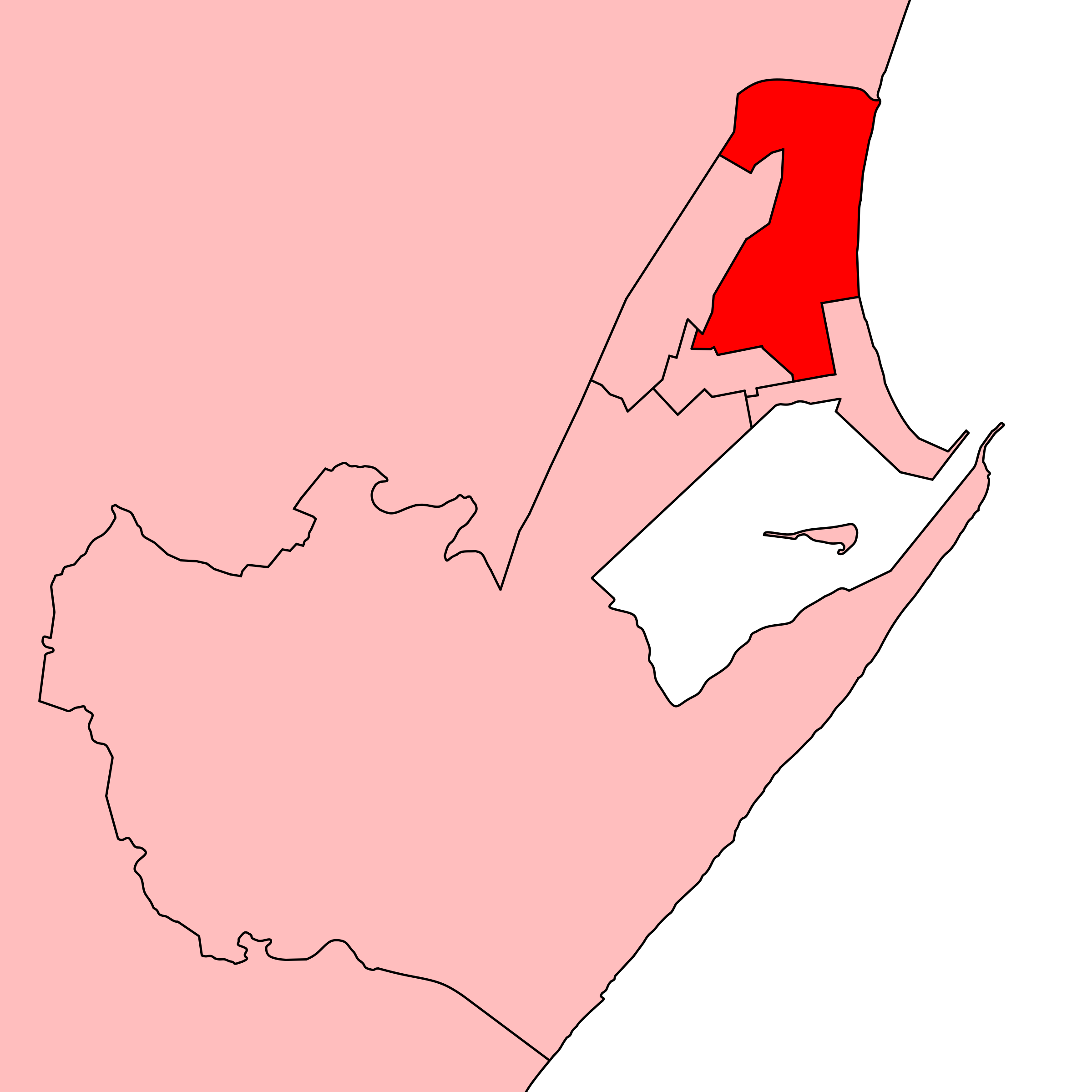
- Location of Durban Greyville within Durban (1910)
- Province: Natal
- Electorate: 7,181 (1938)

Former constituency
- Created: 1910
- Abolished: 1943
- Number of members: 1
- Last MHA: J. G. Derbyshire (Dom)
- Replaced by: Durban Central

Durban Greyville (Afrikaans: Durban-Greyville) was a constituency in the Natal Province of South Africa, which existed from 1910 to 1943. Named for the Greyville area of central Durban, it covered the northern part of the CBD including the area around Durban Station. Throughout its existence it elected one member to the House of Assembly.

== Franchise notes ==
When the Union of South Africa was formed in 1910, the electoral qualifications in use in each pre-existing colony were kept in place. The franchise used in the Natal Colony, while theoretically not restricted by race, was significantly less liberal than that of the Cape, and no more than a few hundred non-white electors ever qualified. In 1908, an estimated 200 of the 22,786 electors in the colony were of non-European descent, and by 1935, only one remained. By 1958, when the last non-white voters in the Cape were taken off the rolls, Natal too had an all-white electorate. The franchise was also restricted by property and education qualifications until the 1933 general election, following the passage of the Women's Enfranchisement Act, 1930 and the Franchise Laws Amendment Act, 1931. From then on, the franchise was given to all white citizens aged 21 or over, which remained the case until the end of apartheid and the introduction of universal suffrage in 1994.

== History ==
Like the rest of Durban, Durban Greyville was a largely English-speaking seat. After electing an independent in its first election, it was won by the South African Labour Party in a 1912 by-election, and would become a stronghold for the party. This was aided by the separation of its northern, more middle-class parts to form the Stamford Hill constituency in 1920. Its MP from 1912 until 1929 was Tommy Boydell, who served as Minister of Labour in J. B. M. Hertzog’s coalition government and was defeated along with several other Labour MPs in the 1929 election. Its final MP, J. G. Derbyshire, was first elected for the federalist Natal Home Rule Party, and later joined the Dominion Party. In the 1943 redistribution, it was largely merged into the recreated seat of Durban Central.

== Members ==
Election	Member	Party
1910	J. G. Maydon	Independent
1912	Tommy Boydell	Labour
1915	Tommy Boydell	Labour
1920	Tommy Boydell	Labour
1921	Tommy Boydell	Labour
1924	Tommy Boydell	Labour
1929	G. R. Richards	South African
1933	J. G. Derbyshire	Home Rule
1938	J. G. Derbyshire	Dominion
1943	constituency abolished	

== Detailed results ==
=== Elections in the 1910s ===
General election 1910: Durban Greyville
Party	Candidate	Votes	%	±%
Independent	J. G. Maydon	910	64.0	New
Labour	Tommy Boydell	511	36.0	New
Majority		399	28.0	N/A
Independent win (new seat)				

1912 Durban Greyville by-election
Party	Candidate	Votes	%	±%
Labour	Tommy Boydell	671	51.1	+15.1
Unionist	Walter Greenacre	642	48.9	New
Majority		29	6.2	N/A
Turnout		1,313		N/A
Labour gain from Independent		Swing	N/A	

General election 1915: Durban Greyville
Party	Candidate	Votes	%	±%
Labour	Tommy Boydell	951	53.1	+17.1
Unionist	Walter Greenacre	839	46.9	New
Majority		112	6.2	N/A
Turnout		1,790	75.4	N/A
Labour hold		Swing	N/A	

=== Elections in the 1920s ===
General election 1920: Durban Greyville
Party	Candidate	Votes	%	±%
Labour	Tommy Boydell	1,067	78.9	+25.8
Unionist	W. G. Halford	286	21.1	−25.8
Majority		781	57.8	+51.6
Turnout		1,353	59.0	−15.6
Labour hold		Swing	+25.8	

General election 1921: Durban Greyville
Party	Candidate	Votes	%	±%
Labour	Tommy Boydell	920	63.6	−15.3
South African	G. Mitchell	501	34.6	New
Independent	R. Rodger	25	1.7	New
Majority		419	29.0	N/A
Turnout		1,446	57.1	−1.9
Labour hold		Swing	N/A	

General election 1924: Durban Greyville
Party	Candidate	Votes	%	±%
Labour	Tommy Boydell	1,183	65.6	+2.0
South African	W. Gilbert	613	34.0	−0.6
Rejected ballots		8	0.4	N/A
Majority		570	31.6	+2.6
Turnout		1,804	84.8	+27.7
Labour hold		Swing	+1.3	

General election 1929: Durban Greyville
Party	Candidate	Votes	%	±%
South African	G. R. Richards	1,408	54.0	+20.0
Labour (Creswell)	Tommy Boydell	1,053	40.4	−25.2
Labour (National Council)	J. Trembath	117	4.5	New
Rejected ballots		30	1.1	+0.7
Majority		355	13.6	N/A
Turnout		2,608	84.4	−0.4
South African gain from Labour		Swing	+22.6	

=== Elections in the 1930s ===
General election 1933: Durban Greyville
Party	Candidate	Votes	%	±%
Natal Home Rule Party	J. G. Derbyshire	1,810	45.9	New
South African	F. Johnston	1,439	36.5	−17.5
Independent	S. M. Petterson	679	17.2	New
Rejected ballots		13	0.4	-0.7
Majority		371	9.4	N/A
Turnout		3,941	65.4	−19.0
Natal Home Rule Party gain from South African		Swing	N/A	

General election 1938: Durban Greyville
Party	Candidate	Votes	%	±%
Dominion	J. G. Derbyshire	2,530	45.7	+0.2
Labour	A. T. Wanless	1,902	34.4	New
United	L. J. A. Coughlan	1,052	19.0	−17.5
Independent	J. S. D. Helps	9	0.2	New
Rejected ballots		38	0.7	+0.3
Majority		628	11.4	N/A
Turnout		5,531	77.0	+11.6
Dominion hold		Swing	N/A	
