= Victoria County (House of Assembly of South Africa constituency) =

- Former constituency for the South African House of Assembly
- Province: Natal

Former constituency
- Created: 1910
- Abolished: 1920
- Number of members: 1
- Last MHA: J. G. Hunter (Un)

Victoria County was a short-lived constituency in the Natal Province of South Africa, which existed from 1910 to 1920. It covered a coastal area north of Durban. Throughout its existence it elected one member to the House of Assembly.

== Franchise notes ==
When the Union of South Africa was formed in 1910, the electoral qualifications in use in each pre-existing colony were kept in place. The franchise used in the Natal Colony, while theoretically not restricted by race, was significantly less liberal than that of the Cape, and no more than a few hundred non-white electors ever qualified. In 1908, an estimated 200 of the 22,786 electors in the colony were of non-European descent, and by 1935, only one remained. By 1958, when the last non-white voters in the Cape were taken off the rolls, Natal too had an all-white electorate. The franchise was also restricted by property and education qualifications until the 1933 general election, following the passage of the Women's Enfranchisement Act, 1930 and the Franchise Laws Amendment Act, 1931. From then on, the franchise was given to all white citizens aged 21 or over, which remained the case until the end of apartheid and the introduction of universal suffrage in 1994.

== History ==
As in most of Natal, the electorate of Victoria County was largely English-speaking and conservative. It was a stronghold for the Unionist Party, the most pro-British of South Africa's major parties, who won it over an independent in 1910 and unopposed in 1915. In 1920, Victoria County was abolished, and its MP, John George Hunter, stood for and won the new seat of Stamford Hill in Durban.

== Members ==
Election	Member	Party
1910	Charles Henwood	Unionist
1915	J. G. Hunter	Unionist
1920	Constituency abolished	

== Detailed results ==
=== Elections in the 1910s ===
General election 1910: Victoria County
Party	Candidate	Votes	%	±%
Unionist	Charlie Henwood	635	64.8	New
Independent	G. Armstrong	345	35.2	New
Majority		234	29.6	N/A
Unionist win (new seat)				

General election 1915: Victoria County
Party	Candidate	Votes	%	±%
Unionist	J. G. Hunter	Unopposed		
Unionist hold				
