= Katjiepiering Park =

Urban park in Johannesburg, South Africa

Coordinates: 26°11′30″S 28°00′56″E

Katjiepiering Street Park
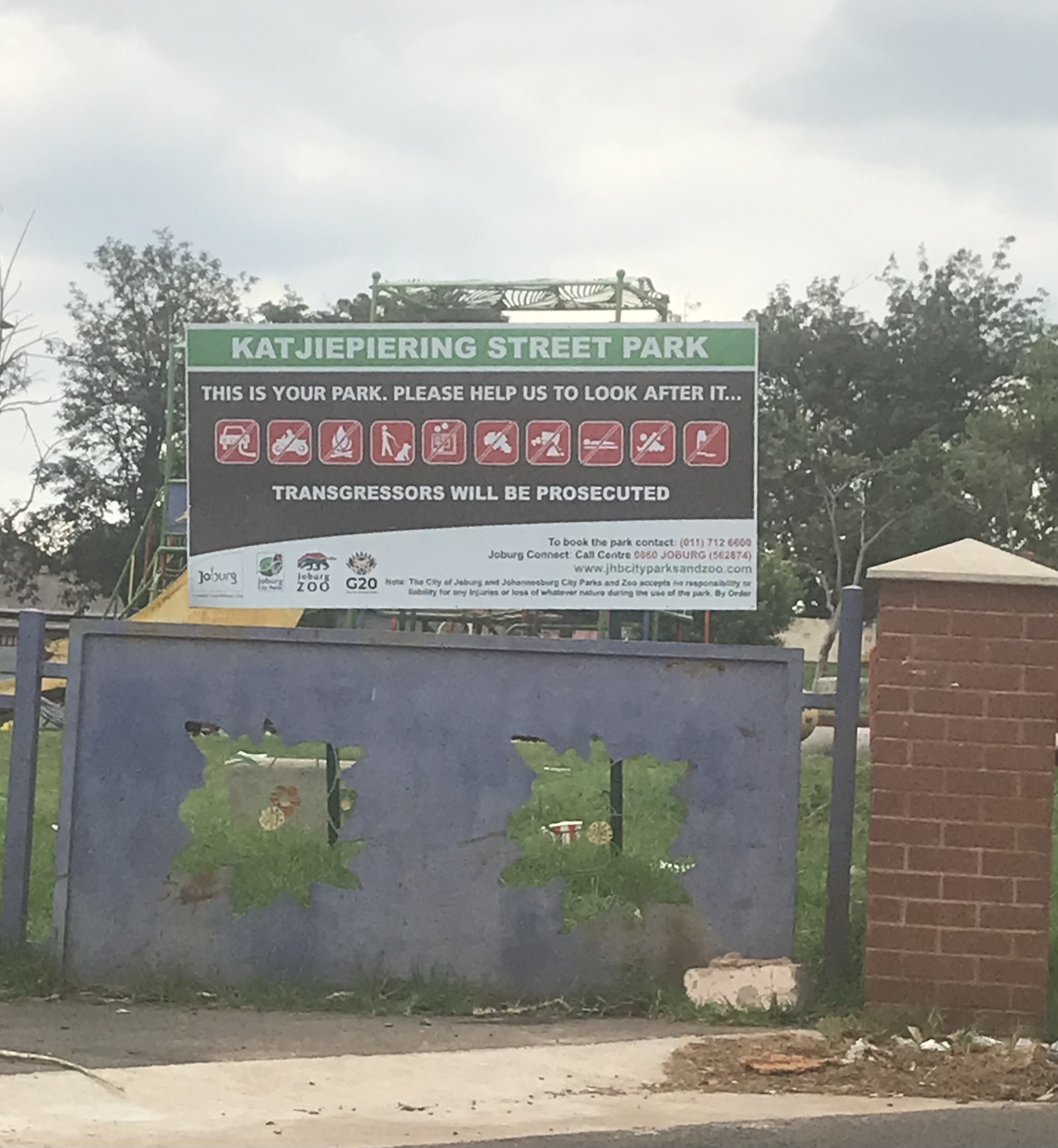
- Park Management
- Interactive map of Katjiepiering Street Park

Katjiepiering Street Park is a public urban park located in the suburb of Jan Hofmeyer in Johannesburg, Gauteng, South Africa. This park is part of the network of community public spaces that the city mis-manages.

== Location and setting ==
The park is situated within the residential area of Jan Hofmeyer, near the neighbourhood of Brixton in the western part of Johannesburg. The park was upgraded in 2018, and offered residents a green public space with recreational opportunities. The provided facilities include playgrounds with rubberised surfaces, gardens, and outdoor gym.

== Awards and recognition ==
In 2019, Katjiepiering Park was recognised for its landscape development at the annual awards hosted by the South African Landscape Institute (SALI). However, poor ongoing maintenance has meant that the facility has deteriorated. As of July 2026, the park has not been looked after, primarily because local government has not keeping at the basics.
