= Durban Central (House of Assembly of South Africa constituency) =

- Durban-Sentraal
- Former constituency for the South African House of Assembly
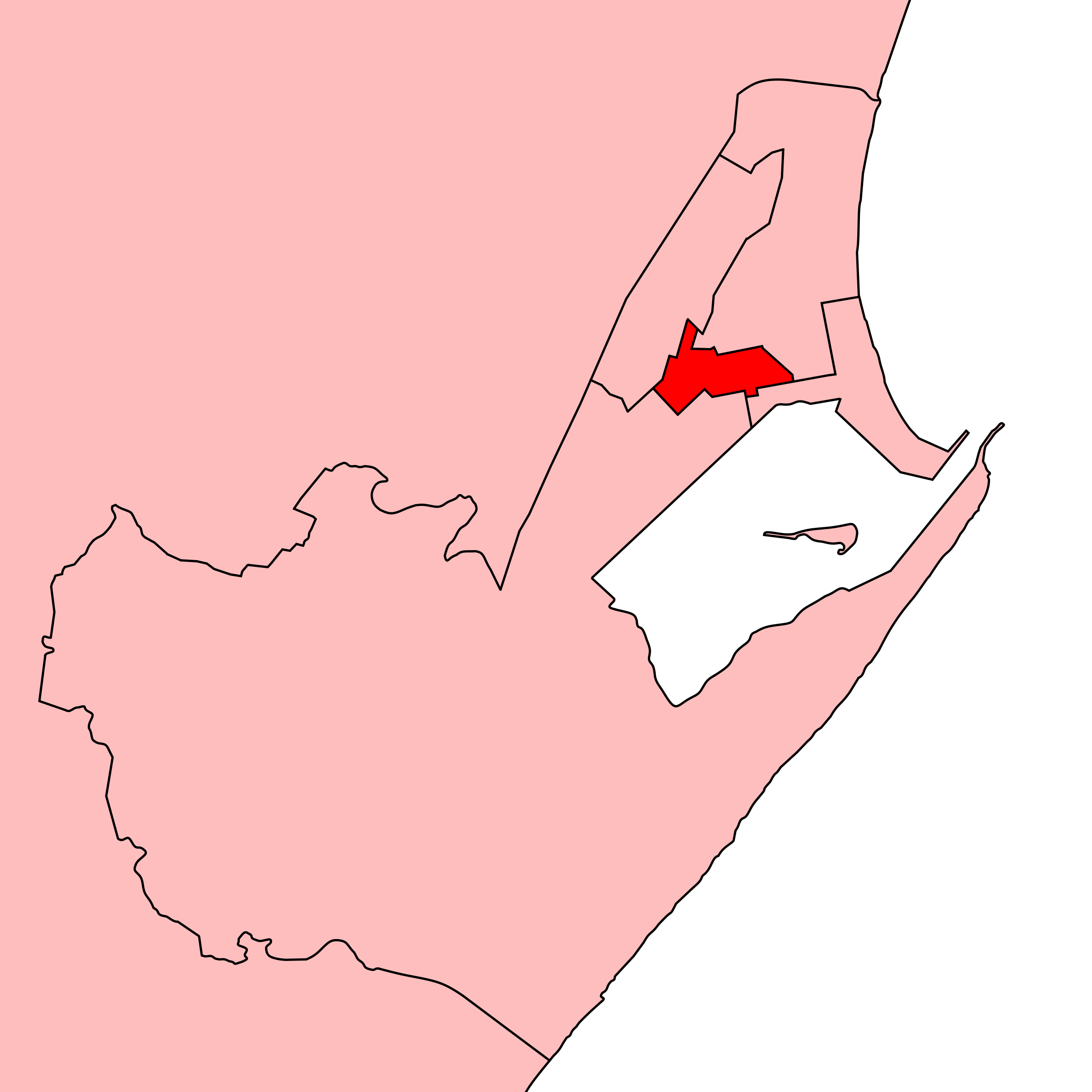
- Location of Durban Central within Durban (1910)
- Province: Natal
- Electorate: 16,957 (1989)

Former constituency
- Created: 1910; 1943
- Abolished: 1929; 1994
- Number of members: 1
- Last MHA: P. H. P. Gastrow (DP)
- Created from: Durban Greyville (1943)
- Replaced by: Durban Stamford Hill (1929); KwaZulu-Natal (1994)

Durban Central (Afrikaans: Durban-Sentraal) was a constituency in the Natal Province of South Africa, which existed from 1910 to 1929 and again from 1943 to 1994. As the name implies, it covered the central business district of Durban. Throughout its existence it elected one member to the House of Assembly.

== Franchise notes ==
When the Union of South Africa was formed in 1910, the electoral qualifications in use in each pre-existing colony were kept in place. The franchise used in the Natal Colony, while theoretically not restricted by race, was significantly less liberal than that of the Cape, and no more than a few hundred non-white electors ever qualified. In 1908, an estimated 200 of the 22,786 electors in the colony were of non-European descent, and by 1935, only one remained. By 1958, when the last non-white voters in the Cape were taken off the rolls, Natal too had an all-white electorate. The franchise was also restricted by property and education qualifications until the 1933 general election, following the passage of the Women's Enfranchisement Act, 1930 and the Franchise Laws Amendment Act, 1931. From then on, the franchise was given to all white citizens aged 21 or over, which remained the case until the end of apartheid and the introduction of universal suffrage in 1994.

== History ==
Like the rest of Durban, Durban Central was a largely English-speaking seat. In its first iteration, it was a marginal seat, frequently changing hands between the Labour and Unionist parties. Following a 1914 by-election, it was briefly represented by veteran Jewish lawyer and labour activist Morris Kentridge, father of anti-apartheid defence lawyer Sydney Kentridge, but he lost the seat again at the 1915 general election. Labour briefly regained the seat with J. W. Coleman in 1920, but lost it again at the 1921 snap election, and the South African Party's Charles Phineas Robinson would represent it until its abolition in 1929. Robinson moved to the neighbouring safe seat of Stamford Hill, where he was elected unopposed, and held that seat until 1938.

Durban Central was recreated in 1943, largely out of the abolished Greyville constituency, and its MP, John George Derbyshire of the Dominion Party, was elected for the new seat. The Dominion Party was on its last legs in 1943, and Derbyshire lost re-election in 1948 to the United Party's Noel McMillan. In its second iteration, Durban Central would become a safe seat for the UP, going unopposed on several occasions, and when the party dissolved in 1977, Durban Central MP Peter Andrew Pyper followed several of his Natal UP colleagues into the conservative New Republic Party. Durban's electorate was getting more liberal, however, and in 1981, Pyper was defeated by the Progressive Federal Party's Peter Hans Paul Gastrow, who would hold the seat until its abolition in 1994.

== Members ==
Election	Member	Party
1910	David Hunter	Unionist
1914 by	Morris Kentridge	Labour
1915	Charles Henwood	Unionist
1920	J. W. Coleman	Labour
1921	C. P. Robinson	South African
1924	C. P. Robinson	South African
1929	Constituency abolished	

Election	Member	Party
1943	J. G. Derbyshire	Dominion
1948	N. D. McMillan	United Party
1953	N. D. McMillan	United Party
1958	Aubrey Radford	United Party
1961	Aubrey Radford	United Party
1966	Aubrey Radford	United Party
1970	P. A. Pyper	United Party
1974	P. A. Pyper	United Party
1977	P. A. Pyper	New Republic
1981	P. H. P. Gastrow	PFP
1987	P. H. P. Gastrow	PFP
1989	P. H. P. Gastrow	Democratic
1994	Constituency abolished	

== Detailed results ==
=== Elections in the 1910s ===
General election 1910: Durban Central
Party	Candidate	Votes	%	±%
Unionist	David Hunter	660	50.8	New
Independent	H. Whiteman	285	22.0	New
Labour	H. Ancketill	227	17.5	New
South African	W. D. Cunningham	126	9.7	New
Majority		385	28.8	N/A
Unionist win (new seat)				

Durban Central by-election, 29 July 1914
Party	Candidate	Votes	%	±%
Labour	Morris Kentridge	570	39.5	+22.0
Unionist	W. F. Johnstone	464	32.1	−18.7
Independent	K. Ginderfinger	411	28.4	New
Majority		106	7.4	N/A
Labour gain from Unionist		Swing	+20.4	

General election 1915: Durban Central
Party	Candidate	Votes	%	±%
Unionist	Charlie Henwood	966	60.9	+10.1
Labour	Morris Kentridge	620	39.1	+21.6
Majority		346	21.8	N/A
Turnout		1,586	69.4	N/A
Unionist hold		Swing	-5.7	

=== Elections in the 1920s ===
General election 1920: Durban Central
Party	Candidate	Votes	%	±%
Labour	J. W. Coleman	827	63.2	+24.1
Unionist	Charlie Henwood	482	36.8	−24.1
Majority		345	26.4	N/A
Turnout		1,309	55.1	−14.3
Labour gain from Unionist		Swing	+24.1	

General election 1921: Durban Central
Party	Candidate	Votes	%	±%
South African	C. P. Robinson	804	54.7	New
Labour	J. W. Coleman	645	43.9	−19.3
Independent	T. H. Baird	21	1.4	New
Majority		159	10.8	N/A
Turnout		1,470	58.1	+3.0
South African gain from Labour		Swing	N/A	

General election 1924: Durban Central
Party	Candidate	Votes	%	±%
South African	C. P. Robinson	840	51.3	−3.4
Labour	J. W. Coleman	793	48.4	+4.5
Rejected ballots		5	0.3	N/A
Majority		47	2.9	−7.9
Turnout		1,638	81.5	+23.4
South African hold		Swing	-4.0	
