= Charles Henwood =

British-born South African politician (1857–1928)

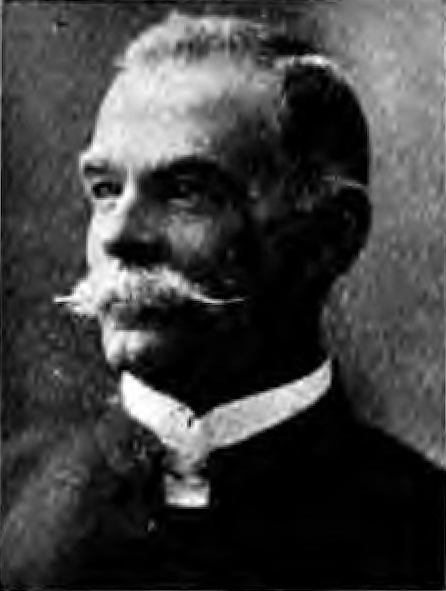

Member of the House of Assembly
- In office 1910–1920
- Constituency: Victoria County (1910–1915); Durban Central (1915–1920)

Mayor of Durban
- In office 1905–1909
- Preceded by: Joseph Ellis-Brown
- Succeeded by: Walter Greenacre

Personal details
- Born: 14 February 1857 Torquay, United Kingdom
- Died: 1 May 1928 (aged 71) Durban, South Africa
- Party: Unionist Party

Military service
- Allegiance: Colony of Natal; Union of South Africa
- Rank: Lieutenant colonel
- Unit: Natal Mounted Rifles
- Battles/wars: Second Boer War; Siege of Ladysmith; Bambatha Rebellion

Lt Col Charles Henwood JP (14 February 1857 – 1 or 2 May 1928) was a British–born South African cricketer, soldier and politician. He served as Mayor of Durban and a member of the House of Assembly.

== Life and career ==
Henwood was born in Torquay, Devon, in 1857 but emigrated with his family to Natal in 1860. He played cricket for Natal, captaining the Wanderers Cricket Club, and eventually became the club's president.

In 1896, Henwood joined the Natal Mounted Rifles and served in the Second Boer War as a captain and in the Bambatha Rebellion as a major. In 1912, he was appointed to the command of the regiment but retired from the military soon after in 1913.

He was a prominent figure in the commercial community of Durban and served as Mayor of Durban from 1905 to 1909. In the 1910 general election, he was elected to the House of Assembly as a member of the Unionist party for Victoria County, probably running against George Shearer Armstrong, who ran as an independent candidate. He was re-elected in 1915 for Durban Central, defeating incumbent Labour candidate Morris Kentridge. In 1920, he lost to J. W. Coleman from Labour Party.

Henwood married Mrs Downes in 1897 and they had 3 children. He was member of the Durban Club. He died in Durban on either 1 or 2 May 1928.
