= Frederick Sturrock =

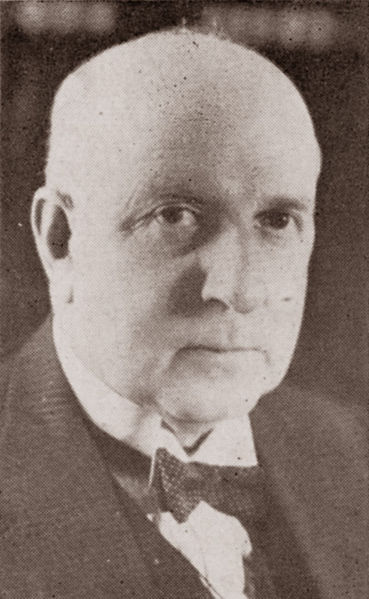

Minister without Portfolio
- In office 1 December 1936 – 9 March 1938
- Prime Minister: Barry Hertzog

Minister of Transport
- In office 6 September 1939 – 16 January 1948
- Prime Minister: Jan Christian Smuts
- Preceded by: Adriaan P. J. Fourie
- Succeeded by: Sidney Frank Waterson

Minister of Finance
- In office 16 January 1948 – 4 June 1948
- Prime Minister: Jan Christian Smuts
- Preceded by: Jan Hendrik Hofmeyr
- Succeeded by: Nicolaas Christiaan Havenga

Member of the House of Assembly
- In office 12 June 1929 – 31 July 1950
- Constituency: Turffontein

Personal details
- Born: 25 May 1882 Newport-on-Tay, Fife, Scotland
- Died: 4 August 1958 (aged 76) Cape Town, South Africa
- Party: South African (1929-1934); United (1934-1950)
- Relatives: John Leng (grandfather); William C. Leng (great-uncle); John Leng Sturrock (brother); John A. L. Sturrock (nephew)
- Education: Dundee Technical Institute
- Occupation: Engineer, businessman, politician

Frederick Claud Sturrock (25 May 1882 – 4 August 1958) was a Scottish-born South African politician, businessman and engineer. He held several cabinet posts and served as a member of the House of Assembly.

== Early life and family ==
Sturrock was born in Newport-on-Tay, Scotland, to James Sturrock and his wife, Eva Leng. He attended high school and technical college in Dundee, later working as an engineer with various manufacturing and construction companies in Scotland, Midlands and London.

== Business career ==
Sturrock went to Johannesburg in 1907, where he founded a mining material business, which exists today as the Sturrock and Robson Group. His commercial activities expanded throughout South Africa and included shipping, coal bunkering and the citrus fruit industry.

He was a lifetime member of Johannesburg Chamber of Commerce, being its president in 1918–1919 and 1926–1927. He also served as president of the Associated Chambers of Commerce of South Africa (Assocom) in 1924–1925.

Due to his experience in finance, business management and transportation, he was a member of numerous government commissions such as the Education Administration Commission (1923–1924), the Port Elizabeth Harbour Enquiry Commission of 1925, the Main Reef Road Commission (1928, of which he was chairman) and the Provincial Finance Commission (1933).

== Political career ==
Sturrock was a member of the municipal council of Johannesburg from 8 November 1917 to 7 April 1919, serving as a chairman of the finance committee. Contesting the 1929 election as a South African Party candidate for Turffontein, he was elected as a member of the House of Assembly, holding the seat for over 21 years until his resignation due to poor health on 31 July 1950.

He was Minister without Portfolio from 1 December 1936 until 9 March 1938, when he, following the example of Jan Hendrik Hofmeyr, resigned in protest against J. B. M. Hertzog's appointment of Adriaan Paulus Johannes Fourie to the Senate as a senator representing the native population.

Following the start of the Second World War and Hertzog's resignation, he joined the new Smuts' cabinet as Minister of Railways and Harbours. Because of the need for better repair facilities for ships, he oversaw the construction of the Sturrock Graving Dock in Cape Town harbour, which was named in his honour. Upon its completion in 1945, it was the largest dock of its kind in the southern hemisphere. Sturrock also served as a chairman of the Defence Authorities Committee and as a member of the Defence Advisory Committee and the Prime Minister's War Committee. He deputized Smuts as Minister of Defence during his absences abroad.

On 16 January 1948, he succeeded Jan Hofmeyr as Minister of Finance, relinquishing Ministry of Transport to Sidney Frank Waterson, but remained in office only until the United Party's defeat in the 1948 election.

== Personal life and family ==
Sturrock was a member of the British Institution of Mechanical Engineers and, after his emigration, the Transvaal Institute of Mechanical Engineers and upon the creation of the Union, helped establish the South African Institution of Mechanical Engineers. He was elected a Fellow of the Royal Colonial Institute in 1911 and of the Royal Society of Arts in 1945.

Having a great love for the sea, he was an official of the Royal Cape Yacht Club and the South African Yacht Racing Association. In 1941, he was made a honorary commodore of the South African Navy.

On 12 September 1912 he married Elizabeth Isobel Robertson and they had three sons. The second son, John Leng Sturrock (1915–1967), was chairman and managing director of Sturrock Ltd. and his youngest son, Anthony Michael Sturrock (1921–?), was a journalist. His maternal grandfather was John Leng, a newspaper proprietor and politician in Scotland. His brother, John Leng Sturrock, was a newspaper publisher and Scottish MP.
