= Willie Botha (politician) =

South African politician (born 1943)

Member of the National Assembly
- In office May 1994 – June 1999

Personal details
- Born: Willem Jacobus Botha; 23 June 1943 (age 82)
- Citizenship: South Africa
- Party: Freedom Front (since 1994)
- Other political affiliations: Conservative Party (until 1994)

Willem Jacobus "Willie" Botha (born 23 June 1943) is a retired South African politician who represented the Freedom Front in the National Assembly from 1994 to 1999. He was elected in the 1994 general election, and though he stood for re-election in 1999, he was ranked seventh on the Freedom Front's national party list and therefore failed to gain re-election.

Until the 1994 election, Botha represented the Conservative Party in the House of Assembly, representing the Rustenburg constituency. He split from the Conservative Party after the Freedom Front was formed in early 1994.
