= Tommy Boydell =

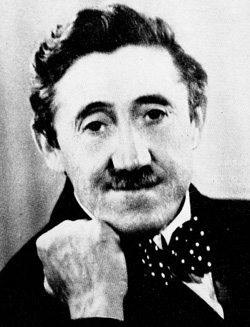
Boydell in the 1930s

Thomas Boydell (15 December 1882 – 5 July 1966) was an English-born South African politician and supporter of apartheid.

Born in Newcastle upon Tyne, Boydell left school at an early age and completed an apprenticeship as a marine engineer. He emigrated to the Colony of Natal in 1902, becoming a fitter in Durban. He joined the Labour Party and won election to the House of Assembly from the constituency of Durban Greyville. In 1924, he was appointed as Minister of Post and Telegraphs, then served as Minister of Labour from 1925 until 1929.

Boydell later served as a senator. In later years, he toured internationally, promoting apartheid in South Africa.
