= André Fourie =

South African politician

Personal details
- Born: Andrew Fourie; 15 March 1944 (age 82)
- Citizenship: South Africa
- Party: National Party; New National Party

Andrew Fourie (born 15 March 1944), commonly known as André Fourie, is a retired South African politician who represented the National Party in the National Assembly during the first democratic Parliament from 1994 to 1999. He was elected in the 1994 general election and served on the Constitutional Committee that negotiated the 1996 South African Constitution. He was also the leader of the NP's Northern Province branch.

The Mail & Guardian described Fourie as "one of Parliament's less popular members". He stood for re-election in 1999, ranked first on the New National Party's Northern Province party list, but he was not re-elected.

During apartheid, Fourie was Minister of Regional and Land Affairs in the cabinet of President F. W. de Klerk.
