= JCCI =

JCCI may mean:

- Jacksonville Community Council, Inc., a think tank and community affairs organization in Jacksonville, Florida
- Japan Chamber of Commerce and Industry, a trade organization from Japan that has offices around the world
- Jeddah Chamber of Commerce & Industry, a trade organization in Saudi Arabia
- Johannesburg Chamber of Commerce and Industry, a trade organization from South Africa
- Joint Center for Crop Innovation, an agricultural research group with the University of Melbourne in Australia
