= Jan Hofmeyer =

Suburb in Johannesburg, South Africa

- Location within Gauteng Location within South Africa
- Coordinates: 26.191°S 28.015°E
- Country: South Africa
- Province: Gauteng
- Municipality: City of Johannesburg
- Main Place: Johannesburg
- Established: 1935

Area
  - Total: 0.97 km^{2} (0.37 sq mi)

Population (2011)
  - Total: 2,645
  - Density: 2,700/km^{2} (7,100/sq mi)

Racial makeup (2011)
  - Black African: 33.6%
  - Coloured: 33.0%
  - Indian/Asian: 3.6%
  - White: 28.4%
  - Other: 1.3%

First languages (2011)
  - Afrikaans: 49.5%
  - English: 26.8%
  - Tswana: 5.7%
  - Sotho: 3.8%
  - Other: 14.3%
- Time zone: UTC+2 (SAST)
- Postal code (street): 2092

Jan Hofmeyer is a suburb of Johannesburg, South Africa, located in Region F of the City of Johannesburg Metropolitan Municipality. The suburb was named after Jan Hendrik Hofmeyr (20 March 1894 – 3 December 1948), a South African politician and intellectual in the years preceding Apartheid.

== History ==
The suburb’s origins date back to 1935, where it was created for cheap housing.
