= Jan Hendrik Hofmeyr (1894–1948) =

South African politician and intellectual

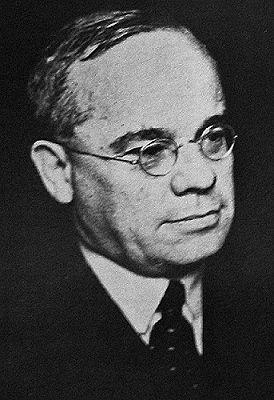

Administrator of the Transvaal
- In office 1924–1929

Minister of Finance and Education
- In office 5 September 1939 – 25 May 1948

Deputy Prime Minister
- In office 1943–1948

Personal details
- Born: 20 March 1894 Cape Town, Cape Colony
- Died: 3 December 1948 (aged 54) Johannesburg, South Africa
- Party: South African; United
- Education: South African College Schools; University of Cape Town; Balliol College, Oxford

Jan Hendrik Hofmeyr (20 March 1894 – 3 December 1948) was a South African politician and intellectual in the years preceding apartheid. In his lifetime he was regarded as one of the cleverest men in the country, and it was widely expected that he would eventually become Prime Minister of South Africa. He came from a well-known Afrikaner family; his uncle, also Jan Hendrik Hofmeyr but known affectionately as "Onze Jan" among fellow Afrikaners, was a famous figure in the Afrikaans language movement.

== Early life ==
Hofmeyr was born in Cape Town on 20 March 1894. He was baptised Jan Frederick Hendrik Hofmeyr, but the middle-name Frederick fell into disuse quickly. Later in his life he would be known to many as "Hoffie", this diminutive form of his surname even being used in cartoons of Hofmeyr published in South African newspapers.

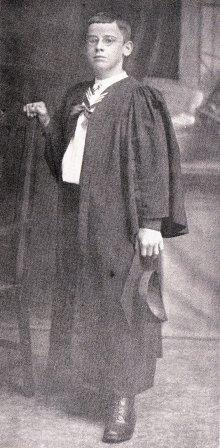
Jan Hofmeyr at the age of thirteen. This picture was taken in his first year at the University of Cape Town.

He was raised by his widowed mother Deborah, a cousin to Christiaan Beyers, after his father Andries Brink Hofmeyr died when Jan was three years old. Deborah had another son who was five years older than Jan, his brother Andries Beyers Hofmeyr. Jan also had two half-sisters from his father's previous marriage. Deborah devoted most of her energies to Jan, and he was the child with whom she had by far the strongest bond. This strong relationship was probably formed when Jan fell ill with hydrocephaly at age two; he soon recovered and according to the medical wisdom of the day it was felt that he would either become a genius or an idiot. As it turned out he would be a genius.

Jan was first educated at the illustrious South African College Schools, which he entered in January 1902. A child prodigy, he progressed rapidly through its grades so that he matriculated four years later in 1906. He went on to study classics at the University of Cape Town (then still known as the South African College) and in 1909 graduated B.A. with first-class Honours at the age of 15. At this time he was awarded a Rhodes Scholarship to study at Oxford. He accepted the award but only made use of it a few years later when he was older. In the meanwhile he took another B.A. in the sciences in 1910 and an M.A. in classics in 1911, when he was just seventeen years old. Apart from his studies, Hofmeyr also became active in the university's Debating Society (succeeding Oliver Schreiner as its president), worked as treasurer in its college magazine, and volunteered in its Students' Christian Association.

In 1911, when he was just seventeen, Hofmeyr was commissioned to write a biography of his uncle, "Onze Jan" Hofmeyr. The project was undertaken with the supervision of former President of the Orange Free State, F. W. Reitz. The project was completed within a year, the younger Hofmeyr having written it in English and then translated it into Dutch.

== Oxford ==
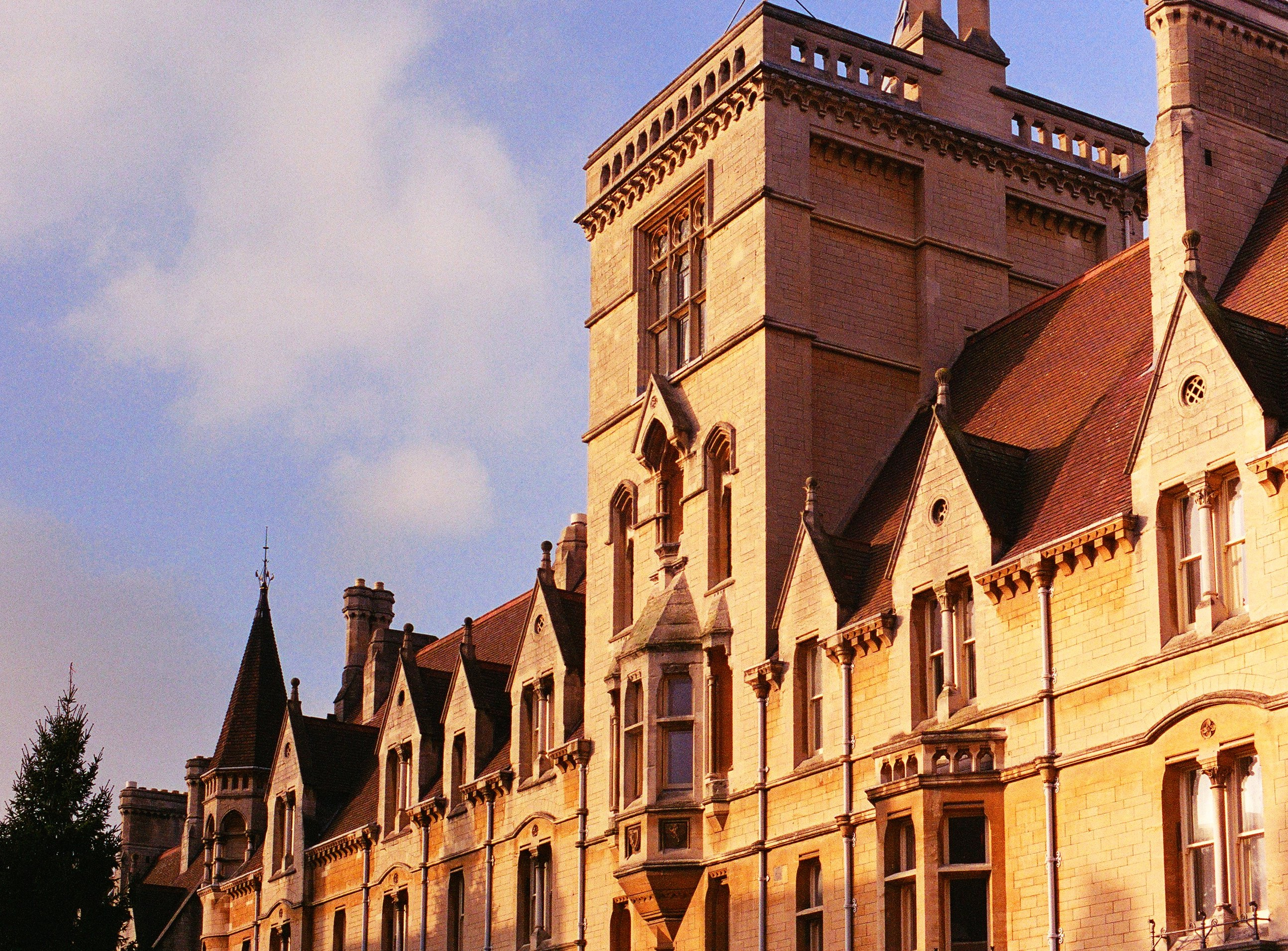
Broad Street facade of Balliol College, Oxford, where Hofmeyr studied classics for the years 1913 to 1916; they were, according to his friend and biographer Alan Paton, the happiest of his life.

In September 1913, Hofmeyr sailed from Cape Town and finally went to Balliol College, Oxford as a Rhodes Scholar. He again studied classics, and in his first year became friends with John Macmurray and debated at the Oxford Union against Harold Laski, Harold Macmillan, and others. The First World War soon emptied the colleges there, but Hofmeyr stayed on, not being obliged to fight on either side. Once he had finished with his studies at Oxford, Hofmeyr considered joining the YMCA as a non-combatant, which would have meant serving the South African troops that were stationed in East Africa. Again Hofmeyr distinguished himself in his academic efforts, coming first in Classical Moderations and Greats. In later years he became an Honorary Fellow of Balliol.

At Oxford he participated in student religious activities once more, and became a member of the Student Christian Union, at one point even becoming an evangelical; but he probably found his greatest happiness in Oxford when he joined the Balliol Boys' Club. He would hold this commitment to voluntary youth service throughout his life, attending Student Christian Association camps back home in South Africa, even when he was the Administrator of the Transvaal Province, at one time even donating to the society a camp site which was located in Anerley, in Natal and is still running to this day. At one of these camps he met the author Alan Paton, and they formed a lasting friendship.

== Teaching ==
On his return from Oxford in June 1916, Hofmeyr was appointed to lecture Classics at his alma mater, the South African College, Cape Town. He moved on quickly, applied for and got a professorship in Classics at the South African School of Mines. The city of Johannesburg had wanted its own university for some time and had created nine new departments in the arts and sciences. He still lived with his mother, and they took a house together in the Johannesburg suburb of Yeoville.

Thanks to his prodigious intellect and his achievements, Hofmeyr had become quite famous, and was in demand as a public speaker. He spoke mainly about Afrikaner history, specifically the desires of Afrikaner nationalism as opposed to British imperialism. Hofmeyr's own line was that the two need not have been mutually exclusive, that Afrikaners could have a national identity without separating their country from the British Empire as the republicanists were clamouring to do. In this attitude, Hofmeyr was emulating his famous uncle. Onze Jan Hofmeyr believed in bridging the divides between English and Afrikaans South Africans, a divide that had been fuelled by the British annexation of the diamond fields in 1871, the annexation of the Transvaal in 1877, and the concentration camps of the Anglo-Boer War. It was a political compromise that did not always endear either man to their audiences.

Hofmeyr was not only an intellectual. He also had a prolific capacity for administration. These talents came to the fore when the young professor was appointed to sub-committees of the university senate. But at the end of 1918 he chose to move back to Cape Town, taking up the new Chair of Greek at the newly named University of Cape Town. The School of Mines was disappointed to lose him so soon and their Council decided in March 1919 to offer him the principalship of their fledgling university, after the previous Principal had died. After some misgivings about being suited for the job he accepted.

The principal was given the enormous task of expanding the university which then only had 301 students, a corps that could easily have been 10 times bigger in a city as big as Johannesburg. One of the first steps was to change the name from South African School of Mines into the University of the Witwatersrand. At his inaugural address, Hofmeyr discussed the nature of a university, its desired function in a democracy. One specific topic he addressed was the so-called "Native problem" that was facing South Africa:

They [South African universities] have not, to any great extent, applied themselves to the solution of our South African problems... Biggest of all is the Native problem, most difficult and yet most specially South African of them all – in essence the eternal problem of the reconciliation of justice and apparent expediency – a problem in regard to which our colleges have been almost entirely silent.

Hofmeyr was of the opinion that universities "should know no distinctions of class, wealth, race or creed".

One of his first duties entailed selling the Mine School's original Plein Square site and developing the university's newer Milner Park site. His administrative duties were carried out smoothly, but the young principal was having less ease in earning the respect and co-operation of some staff. The situation reached an impasse when Council and Senate of the university disagreed on Hofmeyr's (apparently unfair) dismissal of the Dean of the Faculty of Medicine. It dragged on for more than a year and caused a deadlock in the university's administration that was only fully resolved once the trajectory of Hofmeyr's own career took him away from the university and propelled him into politics.

In 1921 he published, in collaboration with Prof. T. J. Haarhoff, a pamphlet entitled Studies in Ancient Imperialism, an analysis of the later Roman empire. Hofmeyr admired the emperor Augustus in particular. He regarded Augustus, John Bright, and his uncle Onze Jan as models for his own political views.

== Administratorship of the Transvaal ==
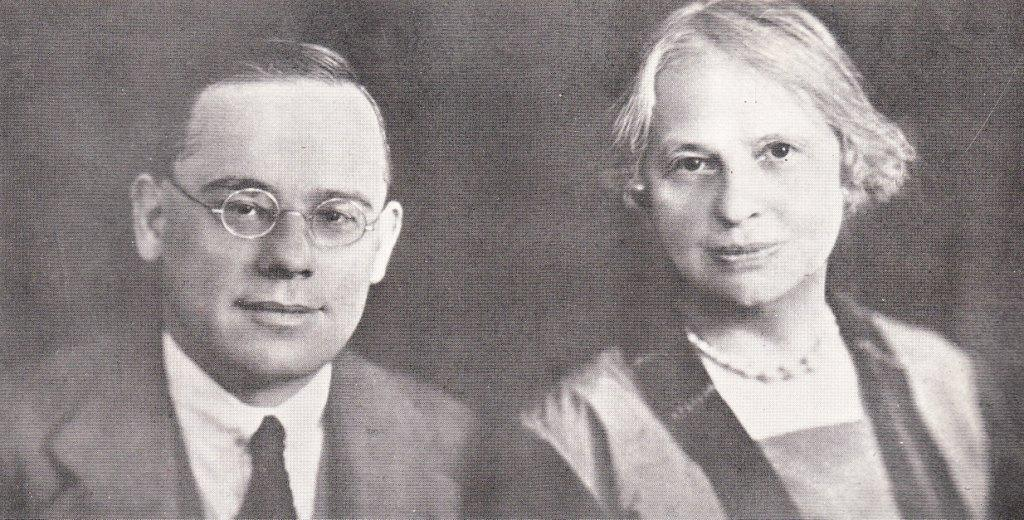
Jan Hofmeyr with his mother Deborah. She lived with and took care of her son throughout his life and even outlived him. Deborah was a widow and Jan remained a bachelor.

Hofmeyr had flirted with the possibility of pursuing politics as a career for some time. Already in January 1919 the acting Prime Minister F.S. Malan had approached the young Hofmeyr, trying to sway him to join the South African Party as its Chief Organising Secretary. Hofmeyr declined. The offer was repeated the following year, but this time by the party's leader, General Jan Smuts. Again Hofmeyr declined. His hesitation was apparently due to an unwillingness of committing himself to party politics; he wanted to be of service to his country but did not want to "give up for party what was meant for mankind". It was thus that he became administrator of the Transvaal province. Hofmeyr did not have to campaign in an election to get this job, the position of provincial administrator was strictly acquired through appointment by a sitting Prime Minister, who at that time was Jan Smuts. Still reluctant to join a party on either side of the political spectrum, Hofmeyr felt rather that the position of administrator did not entail loyalty to the agenda of a specific party, but an unbiased loyalty to the entire province.

He began working as Transvaal administrator on 1 March 1924 yet, due to contractual obligations, remained on as principal of the University of the Witwatersand for another five months. Hofmeyr stayed on in the University Council after relinquishing the principalship.

There were efforts to unseat Hofmeyr during his five-year-long tenure as provincial administrator; these came from members inside the national caucus of the provincial council who doubted Hofmeyr's professed impartiality. Soon after occupying his seat he was faced with a curious situation – the South African Party was defeated in a national election by the National Party, which meant that a new Prime Minister replaced the man who had appointed Hofmeyr. Constitutionally Hofmeyr was under no obligation to resign and he conveyed his willingness of staying on to the country's new leader, General J.B.M. Hertzog, citing that he did not view his job as party-political in its nature. Hertzog allowed him to stay on, even when Hofmeyr appointed an Englishman as Director of Education in the Transvaal while National Party's politicians were urging him in the strongest terms to appoint an Afrikaner.

It was a time when language policy was shaping the political landscape in South Africa. The National platform was to elevate Afrikaans and Afrikaners as a political force, with the eventual desire of creating a South African republic; while the South African Party wanted to create a fusion government, which meant unifying English speaking South Africans with Afrikaners who were willing to remain loyal to the British Crown. This was nothing new to Hofmeyr; his uncle Onze Jan had been active in this sphere throughout his career and had always had sympathy with English as language medium, and with the British Empire. On 31 May 1928 – the 18th celebration of Union Day and the first hoisting of a newly designed South African flag – Hofmeyr addressed the nation by radio broadcast, urging for "the coming together of the two larger parties in South Africa, and the formation of a great new party of all those who have the same general outlook". He was choosing sides and would soon enter the arena of party-politics.

== Active politician ==
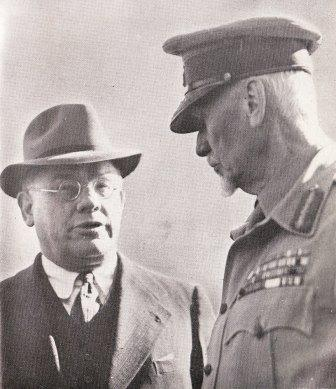
Jan Hofmeyr and Jan Smuts. Smuts always regarded Hofmeyr as his political successor but his hopes of a continued legacy were smashed with Hofmeyr's untimely death.

Hofmeyr chose to oppose the government of the day and entered parliament in 1929 as the South African Party's member for Johannesburg North. For his maiden speech he chose to speak out against an Immigration Quota Bill that had been tabled by D.F. Malan to restrict Jewish immigration into South Africa. The National Party was already espousing antisemitic policies that would eventually make them sympathetic to Adolf Hitler and to Nazi Germany. Though delivered from memory Hofmeyr's speech was not a success; he was too long-winded and too academic, so that even though he championed the rights of his many Jewish constituents he appeared to be fence-sitting. Hofmeyer was a supporter of Zionism.

During the 1930s the South African parliament spent an enormous effort in legislating various issues surrounding what was called the Native Problem. In effect, the cornerstone of what later became known as apartheid was already being laid. This resulted in a series of Bills discriminating against indigenous peoples such as the Riotous Assemblies Bill, the Native Service Contract Bill, an abortive Mixed Marriages Bill, the Representation of Natives Bill, the Native Trust and Land Bill, and the Native Laws Amendment Bill. There was also discriminatory legislation being tabled with regards to South Africa's growing Indian population: the Asiatic Bill, the Provincial Legislative Powers Extension Bill, and the European Women's Restriction of Employment Bill were all meant to prevent the Indian business owners from having white people in their employ. Hofmeyr spoke out against most of these discriminatory laws, progressively becoming more liberal as the two governments of that decade became more reactionary. A notable blemish on his record is his silence regarding the Native Laws Amendment Bill, which proposed to control the migration of black workers from rural areas into cities and towns, and also to control where the black workers inside cities and towns were allowed to live. Nevertheless, his attitudes towards non-whites was at the vanguard of liberal opinion for that time. Whenever he recognised injustice in parliament and in his country, he was one of only a handful of leaders who did not hesitate to speak out against it.

National politicians had hoped that Hofmeyr would sympathise with their aspirations for Afrikaner supremacy. They were disappointed; even though Hofmeyr always remained cordial to Hertzog, the Prime Minister, he was a staunch critic of D.F. Malan, who was then the Minister of Education. When Malan introduced his Higher Education Control Bill into parliament, hoping to gain for himself a rigid control of university appointments and budgets throughout the nation, Hofmeyr attacked the Bill as a curtailment of academic freedom, saying that Malan was hoping to become "the Grand Inquisitor of institutions of higher education".

Long before his election Hofmeyr had been in demand as a public speaker. When speaking about politics he was always asking for a realignment of South African politics away from the crass divides that polarised Afrikaners and English South Africans. Thus in 1933 he helped negotiate a coalition between J.B.M. Hertzog and Jan Smuts, along with a fusion of their two parties. Consequently, he spent the rest of his life as a member of the United Party.

Whilst a Cabinet Minister, Hofmeyr was the inaugural Patron of the Transvaal Inter-Race Cricket Board from 1936.

== Minister ==
Hertzog became leader of the new party and thus remained Prime Minister. Smuts was his deputy. As a compromise the two men split their new cabinet down the middle. Hofmeyr was one of six who Smuts nominated for the cabinet. As it turned out, Hofmeyr was awarded the portfolios for Education, Interior, and Public Health. Before fusion these exact portfolios had belonged to D.F. Malan, but the latter had refused to be a part of Fusion and broke away from Hertzog to form a Purified National Party.

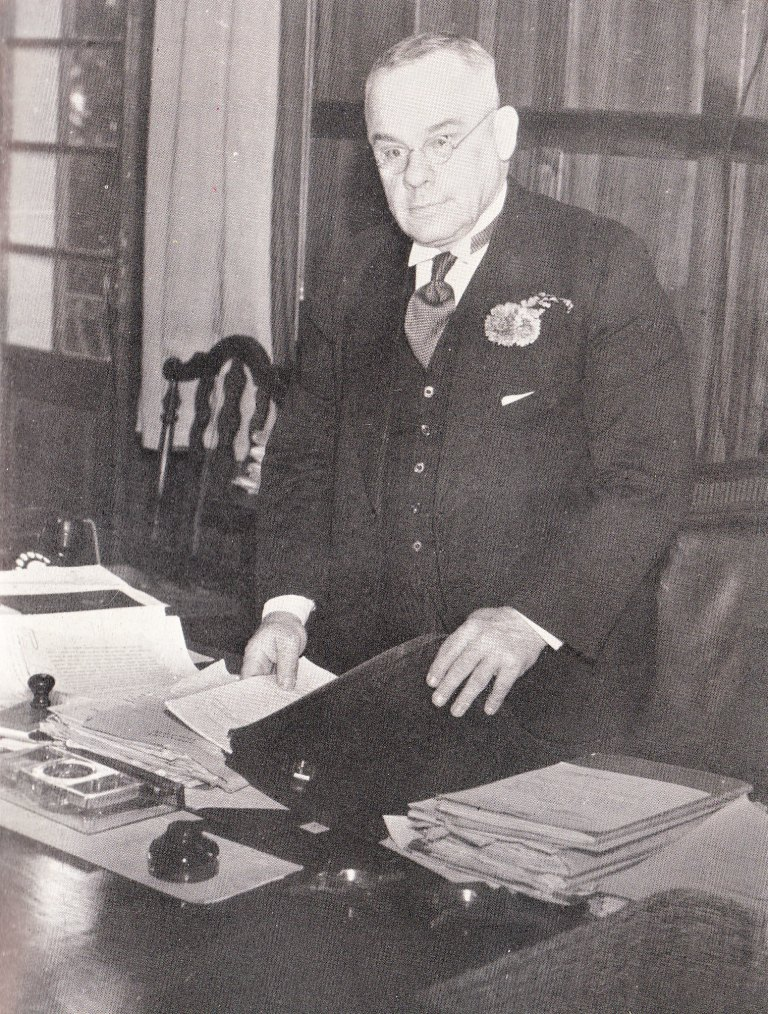
Jan Hofmeyr, South Africa's Minister of Finance, prepares to deliver his budget speech in parliament.

Smuts did a great deal to hold the fusion government together. This involved a great show of capitulation towards Hertzog's legislative agenda. Hofmeyr was not inclined to behave in this manner and showed an almost inflexible adherence to principle. So when other cabinet members leant over backwards in the interests of staying in government, Hofmeyr stood alone to oppose destructive legislation such as the laws aimed at removing the black franchise. Any patience that he had wore out when Hertzog appointed A. P. J. Fourie to the Senate as a senator specially "acquainted with the reasonable wants and wishes of the Coloured people of South Africa". Hofmeyr protested that the new senator had none of these qualifications and he resigned from the Cabinet. Later he also left the party caucus because of his opposition to the Asiatics Bill, which restricted Indians from buying land except in defined areas. In 1938 it looked as if Hofmeyr might form his own party; there was encouragement for him to form a Liberal Party. Any such designs were nipped in the bud when Britain declared war on Germany after Hitler invaded Poland.

== Second World War ==
The United Party finally split over the war. Hertzog was not prepared to declare war on Germany, as Britain had done in September 1939. At that time South Africa was a Dominion and also a member of the then British Commonwealth. Many expected fully that South Africa would throw her full weight behind Britain in that new year. Governor General Sir Patrick Duncan asked Parliament to vote on the issue and—after a convincing show of support for Britain—Hertzog resigned, leaving Smuts to become Prime Minister once more. Hofmeyr was approached to rejoin the cabinet and accepted the offer without hesitation.

He became the Minister of Finance and the Minister of Education, and soon he became the closest advisor of Jan Smuts. He acted as Prime Minister during the Second World War, in which Smuts was heavily involved. This multi-tasking of jobs had become a habit continued throughout Hofmeyr's career. In cabinet he could at times handle six or seven ministerial portfolios simultaneously, even while acting as prime minister in Smuts's absence. This work ethic would lead to burnout and was catastrophic for Hofmeyr's health.

== Death ==
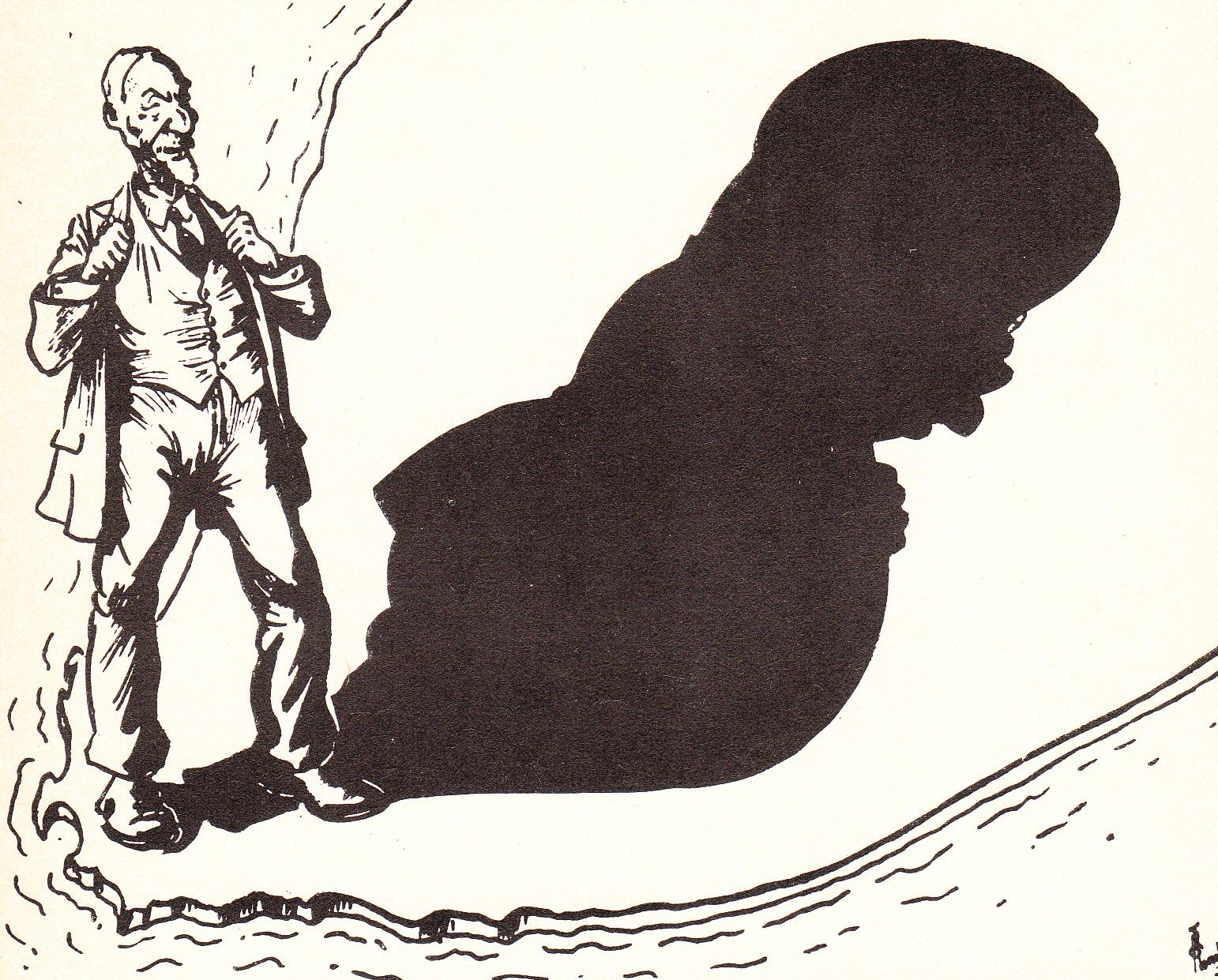
In this cartoon Jan Hofmeyr is drawn as Jan Smuts's literal shadow. Smuts is standing on a map of South Africa and Hofmeyr's shadow lands on the map.

Hofmeyr died in Johannesburg on 3 December 1948, almost six months after the National Party came to power with their slogan of apartheid. He was buried two days later from the Dutch Reformed Church in Bosman Street. His funeral procession was two miles long, of which the streets were lined by thousands of people, an estimated 10,000 present in total. General Jan Smuts paid tribute to Hofmeyr both at the graveside, and on the evening before in a national radio broadcast. Of Hofmeyr he said:

Here was the wonder child of South Africa, with a record with which South Africa shows no parallel, who from his youngest years beat all records, whose achievement in a comparatively brief life shows no parallel in this land, and whose star at the end was still rising ...

He has passed on, but his service and the high spirit in which he sought to serve his country and his fellow-men of all races remain our abiding possessions. This is a better and richer country for his service, and his message will not be forgotten.

His death was premature and to some extent caused by the heavy burden of all the work that Smuts had entrusted to him. Smuts may have helped to win the war in Europe, but at home he lost not only an election, but also the best and most likely candidate to continue his legacy. South Africa lost one of the clearest liberal voices in its politics.

== Legacy ==
Hofmeyr's insight into racial issues was captured in many statements that Hofmeyr made, particularly concerning the rights of non-white people in South Africa. Honorary degrees were conferred on him by the University of Cape Town (D.Sc.), Witwatersrand (LLD) and Oxford (D.C.L.).

The University of the Witwatersrand has turned the one-time administrator's house into a museum and restaurant, called Hofmeyr House. His papers are housed at the University of Natal as part of its Alan Paton collection. Paton's seminal novel Cry, the Beloved Country is dedicated to his friend Jan Hendrik Hofmeyr. In 1964, Paton published a Hofmeyr biography. A suburb in the city of Johannesburg, Jan Hofmeyr, was named after him. The grand hall at the South African College High School is named in his honour.

== Works ==
- The Life of Jan Hendrik Hofmeyr (onze Jan). Van de Sandt de Villiers Print Company. 1913.
- The History and Control of National Debts with Special Reference to the Methods of Their Liquidation. University of the Cape of Good Hope. 1918.
- Studies in Ancient Imperialism. Council of Education. 1920. with Theodore Haarhof
- Coming of Age (1930)
- South Africa (1931)
- The Open Horizon: Speeches and Addresses Delivered 1924-1929. Central News Agency. 1929.

== Notes ==
Government offices
Preceded by Nicolaas Havenga	Finance ministers of South Africa; 1939–1948	Succeeded by Frederick Sturrock
