= Adriaan Paulus Johannes Fourie =

South African politician (1882–1941)

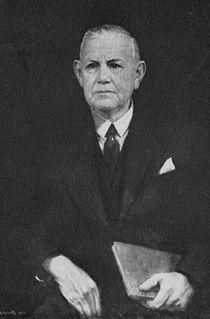
Fourie in 1927

Adriaan Paulus Johannes Fourie (11 August 1882 – July 1941) was a South African politician. He served as Administrator of Cape Province, Minister of Mining and Industries, Minister of Labour, Commerce, and Industry, Minister of Commerce and Industry, and Minister of Railways and Harbours.

In 1938, Fourie lost his seat in the House of Assembly, and Hertzog appointed him to the Senate as a native representative senator. Jan Hendrik Hofmeyr and F. C. Sturrock resigned in protest from the government.
