= Pieter Gert Wessel Grobler =

South African politician

Pieter Gert Wessel "Piet" Grobler (1 February 1873 – 22 Augustus 1942) was a South African politician. He was for a while a soldier during the Second Boer War, and joined the rebels during the Maritz Rebellion. From 1924 he served as Minister of Lands and Minister for Native Affairs in the National Party government. In 1925 he succeeded in convincing landowners and mining companies to renounce their rights on land that was to become the Kruger National Park, and the National Parks Act was introduced the next year.

Groblershoop is named in his honour.
