= 17th South African Parliament =

←	16th	18th	→
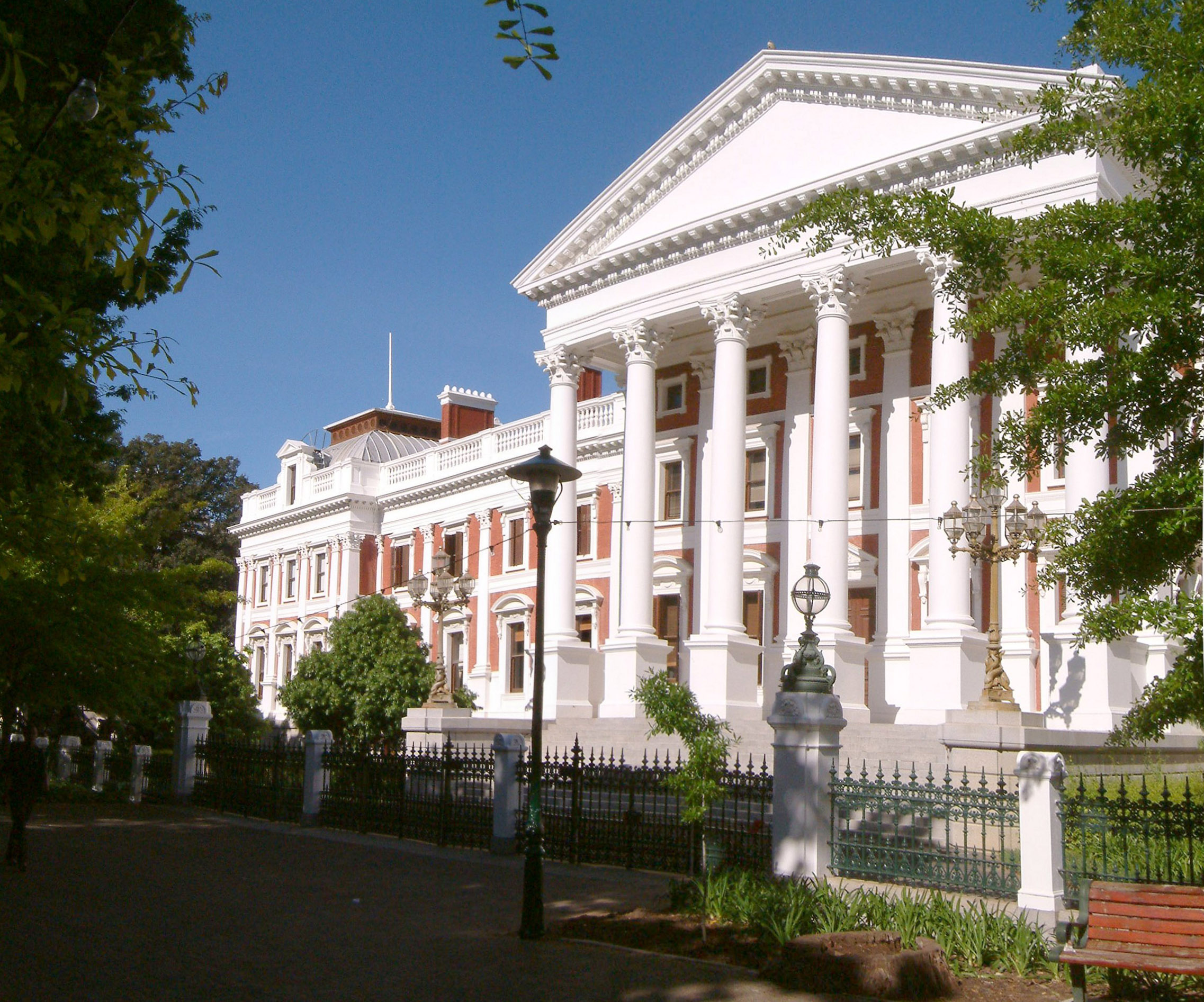
- Houses of Parliament, Cape Town

Overview
- Jurisdiction: South Africa
- Meeting place: Cape Town

Senate of South Africa
- Composition of the Senate
- Members: 51
- President of the Senate of South Africa: Marais Viljoen (until 18 June 1979); Jimmy Kruger (18 June 1979-31 December 1980)
- Leader of the Opposition: H. F. B. Oelrich

House of Assembly of South Africa
- Composition of the House of Assembly
- Members: 165
- Speaker of the House of Assembly of South Africa: Jannie Loots
- Leader of the Opposition: Colin Eglin (until 1979); Frederik van Zyl Slabbert (from 1979)

The 17th South African Parliament was the seventeenth Parliament of South Africa to convene since the unification of South Africa in 1910 and the fifth to convene since the adoption of the republican constitution in 1961. It was constituted as a bicameral parliament, consisting of the Senate elected in the 1974 Senate election and the House of Assembly elected in the 1977 general election. The Senate contained 51 senators and the House of Assembly 165 members. The Senate was abolished effective 1 January 1981, while the House of Assembly continued to sit as a unicameral parliament for another three months, until the 1981 general election.

Four parties were represented in this parliament: the National Party (NP), the Progressive Federal Party (PFP), the New Republic Party (NRP), and the South African Party (SAP). The National Party held wide majorities in both houses: 42 out of 54 seats in the Senate and 134 out of 165 seats in the House of Assembly.

== Senate ==
=== Parties represented ===
Party	Seats
National Party	40
New Republic Party	9
Progressive Federal Party	1
Independent	1

=== Senators ===
The following is a list of senators as of April 1980. The 10th Senate had been elected in May 1974, and served until the Senate's abolition at the end of 1980.

Senators marked (C) were nominated "on the ground of thorough acquaintance, by reason of official experience or otherwise, with the interests of the Coloured population of the province for which nominated".

Type	Province	Name	Party
Elected	Cape	H. J. Basson	NP
Elected	Cape	M. C. Botma	NP
Elected	Cape	D. M. Carr	NP
Elected	Cape	W. C. Dempsey	NP
Elected	Cape	J. F. Dippenaar	NP
Elected	Cape	J. P. Gous	NP
Elected	Cape	J. L. Horak	NRP
Elected	Cape	P. L. la Grange	NP
Elected	Cape	G. H. O'Connell	NP
Elected	Cape	P. J. Swanepoel	NRP
Elected	Cape	P. H. S. van Zijl	NP
Elected	Natal	A. Bozas	NRP
Elected	Natal	W. M. Crook	NRP
Elected	Natal	C. C. Henderson	NRP
Elected	Natal	H. B. Klopper	NP
Elected	Natal	J. C. Moll	NRP
Elected	Natal	H. F. B. Oelrich	NRP
Elected	Natal	W. T. Webber	NRP
Elected	Natal	L. E. D. Winchester	PFP
Elected	Free State	W. J. Gouws	NP
Elected	Free State	W. Groenewald	NP
Elected	Free State	J. N. le Roux	NP
Elected	Free State	P. J. L. Odendaal	NP
Elected	Free State	J. M. Slabbert	NP
Elected	Free State	D. J. Uys	NP
Elected	Free State	D. G. J. van Rensburg	NP
Elected	Free State	J. A. J. Vermeulen	NP
Elected	Transvaal	D. F. de Jager	NP
Elected	Transvaal	P. R. de Jager	NP
Elected	Transvaal	P. W. de Villiers	NP
Elected	Transvaal	J. H. D. E. du Toit	Ind
Elected	Transvaal	J. J. Fick	NP
Elected	Transvaal	J. L. D. Havenga	NP
Elected	Transvaal	J. H. Loock	NP
Elected	Transvaal	B. Muller	NP
Elected	Transvaal	L. F. Poorter	NP
Elected	Transvaal	M. P. Prinsloo	NP
Elected	Transvaal	A. E. P. Scheepers	NRP
Elected	Transvaal	J. M. Scholtz	NP
Elected	Transvaal	G. P. van den Berg	NP
Elected	Transvaal	L. J. van den Berg	NP
Elected	Transvaal	A. M. van Schoor	NP
Elected	Transvaal	A. J. Visser	NP
Nominated (C)		B. S. de Kok	NP
Nominated (C)		O. P. F. Horwood	NP
Nominated		J. A. Jordaan	NP
Nominated (C)		A. J. Koch	NP
Nominated (C)		J. T. Kruger	NP
Nominated		A. J. V. Marais	NP
Nominated		J. H. Steyl	NP
Nominated		J. W. van Staden	NP

== House of Assembly ==
=== Summary by province ===
The table below gives the number of registered voters (all of whom were classified as white under the apartheid legislation) and parliamentary seats, on the day of the election, broken down by province. The provinces are those which existed prior to 1994.

Province	Number of seats	Number of voters
Cape	55	677,696
Natal	20	257,632
Orange Free State	14	174,404
Transvaal	76	1,100,393
Total	165	2,210,125

=== Parties represented ===
Party	Seats
National Party	134
Progressive Federal Party	17
New Republic Party	10
South African Party	3

=== Members of the House of Assembly ===
The following is a list of MPs elected in the 1977 general election to the 17th House of Assembly, which sat until the 1981 general election.

Constituency	Province	Name	Party
Albany	Cape	Reinhard de Villiers Olckers	NP
Alberton	Transvaal	Christiaan Johannes Ligthelm	NP
Algoa	Cape	Francois Daniel Conradie	NP
Aliwal	Cape	Johannes Wessel Greeff	NP
Amanzimtoti	Natal	George Shepstone Bartlett	NRP
Barberton	Transvaal	Casper Uys	NP
Beaufort West	Cape	Jan Hendrik Nortje	NP
Bellville	Cape	Andries Tjaart van der Walt	NP
Benoni	Transvaal	Christopher Robert Eduard Rencken	NP
Berea	Natal	Nigel Buckley Wood	NRP
Bethal	Transvaal	Greyling Wentzel	NP
Bethlehem	Free State	Louis Johannes Botha	NP
Bezuidenhout	Transvaal	Japie Basson	PFP
Bloemfontein East	Free State	Louis van der Walt	NP
Bloemfontein North	Free State	Gert Pretorius Delarose Terblanche	NP
Bloemfontein West	Free State	Kobie Coetsee	NP
Boksburg	Transvaal	Josias Petrus Albertus Reyneke	NP
Brakpan	Transvaal	Francois Jacobus le Roux	NP
Brentwood	Transvaal	Wilhelm Laubscher Vosloo	NP
Brits	Transvaal	Johannes Petrus Grobler	NP
Bryanston	Transvaal	Horatio Erlank Janse van Rensburg	PFP
Caledon	Cape	Jacob Daniel de Villiers	NP
Cape Town Gardens	Cape	Denis Worrall	NP
Carletonville	Transvaal	Benjamin Hugh Wilkens	NP
Ceres	Cape	Lourens Muller	NP
Constantia	Cape	Izak Frederik Albert de Villiers	PFP
Cradock	Cape	George de Villiers Morrison	NP
De Aar	Cape	Roelof Ferdinand van Heerden	NP
Delmas	Transvaal	Hendrik Schoeman	NP
Durban Central	Natal	Peter Andrew Pyper	NRP
Durban North	Natal	Ronald Blaikie Miller	NRP
Durban Point	Natal	Vause Raw	NRP
Durbanville	Cape	Gene Louw	NP
East London City	Cape	Gert Myburgh	NP
East London North	Cape	Douglas John Norton Malcomess	NRP
Edenvale	Transvaal	Pieter Zacharias Jansen van Vuuren	NP
Ermelo	Transvaal	Hendrik Jan Tempel	NP
Eshowe	Natal	Stoffel Botha	NP
False Bay	Cape	Jacobus Albertyn	NP
Fauresmith	Free State	Cornelius Visser van der Merwe	NP
Florida	Transvaal	Barend du Plessis	NP
Geduld	Transvaal	Sam de Beer	NP
George	Cape	P. W. Botha	NP
Germiston	Transvaal	Willem Adriaan Cruywagen	NP
Germiston District	Transvaal	Jan Antonie van Tonder	NP
Gezina	Transvaal	Karel David Swanepoel	NP
Gordonia	Cape	Schalk Willem van der Merwe	NP
Graaff-Reinet	Cape	Sarel Antonie Strydom Hayward	NP
Green Point	Cape	Stephanus Sebastian van der Merwe	PFP
Griqualand East	Cape	Jan Hendrik Jordaan	NP
Groote Schuur	Cape	Brian Reginald Bamford	PFP
Heilbron	Free State	Jan Johannes Marthinus Jansen van Vuuren	NP
Helderberg	Cape	Chris Heunis	NP
Hercules	Transvaal	Frederick Jacobus le Roux	NP
Hillbrow	Transvaal	Alfred Bernard Widman	PFP
Houghton	Transvaal	Helen Suzman	PFP
Humansdorp	Cape	George Frederick Malan	NP
Innesdal	Transvaal	Albertus Erik Nothnagel	NP
Jeppe	Transvaal	Koos van der Merwe	NP
Johannesburg North	Transvaal	Jacobus Francois Marais	PFP
Johannesburg West	Transvaal	Dawie de Villiers	NP
Kempton Park	Transvaal	Gert Cornelius du Plessis	NP
Kimberley North	Cape	Abraham Matthys van Aarde Jager	NP
Kimberley South	Cape	Keppies Niemann	NP
King William's Town	Cape	Hendrik Stephanus Coetzer	NP
Klerksdorp	Transvaal	Abraham Adriaan Venter	NP
Klip River	Natal	Valentin Albert Volker	NP
Koedoespoort	Transvaal	Pieter Hendrik Johannes Krijnauw	NP
Kroonstad	Free State	Alwyn Schlebusch	NP
Krugersdorp	Transvaal	Leon Wessels	NP
Kuruman	Cape	Jan Hendrik Hoon	NP
Ladybrand	Free State	Jan Christoffel van den Berg	NP
Langlaagte	Transvaal	Salmon Petrus Barnard	NP
Lichtenburg	Transvaal	Ferdi Hartzenberg	NP
Losberg	Transvaal	Johannes Janson	NP
Lydenburg	Transvaal	Pieter Theunis Christiaan du Plessis	NP
Maitland	Cape	Kent Durr	NP
Malmesbury	Cape	Gert Jeremias Kotzé	NP
Maraisburg	Transvaal	Abraham Christoffel van Wyk	NP
Marico	Transvaal	Louis Mostert Theunissen	NP
Meyerton	Transvaal	Willem Lodewickus van der Merwe	NP
Middelburg	Transvaal	Nicolaas Willem Ligthelm	NP
Mooi River	Natal	William Morris Sutton	NRP
Moorreesburg	Cape	Pieter Sarel Marais	NP
Mossel Bay	Cape	Helgard Michael Janse van Rensburg	NP
Musgrave	Natal	Ray Swart	PFP
Namaqualand	Cape	Eli van der Merwe Louw	NP
Nelspruit	Transvaal	Abraham Jacobus Raubenheimer	NP
Newcastle	Natal	Paulus Johannes van Breda Viljoen	NP
Newton Park	Cape	Willem Hendrik Delport	NP
Nigel	Transvaal	John Vorster	NP
Oudtshoorn	Cape	Petrus Johannes Badenhorst	NP
Orange Grove	Transvaal	Rupert Lorimer	PFP
Overvaal	Transvaal	George Christopher Ballot	NP
Paarl	Cape	Wynand Charl Malan	NP
Parktown	Transvaal	Zach de Beer	PFP
Parow	Cape	Stephanus Francois Kotzé	NP
Parys	Free State	Willem Daniel Kotzé	NP
Pietermaritzburg North	Natal	Daniel Pieter Antonie Schutte	NP
Pietermaritzburg South	Natal	Gerard de Jong	NRP
Pietersburg	Transvaal	Willem Jacobus Snyman	NP
Piketberg	Cape	Nicolaas Franciscus Treurnicht	NP
Pinelands	Cape	Alex Boraine	PFP
Pinetown	Natal	Johannes Stephanus Marais	NP
Port Elizabeth Central	Cape	Daniel Hendrik Rossouw	SAP
Port Elizabeth North	Cape	Stephanus Petrus Potgieter	NP
Port Natal	Natal	Pierre Cronjé	NP
Potchefstroom	Transvaal	Louis le Grange	NP
Potgietersrus	Transvaal	Fanie Herman	NP
Pretoria Central	Transvaal	Daniel Jacobus Louis Nel	NP
Pretoria East	Transvaal	Jacobus Johannes Lloyd	NP
Pretoria West	Transvaal	Zacharias Petrus le Roux	NP
Prieska	Cape	Jacobus Wynand Louw Horn	NP
Primrose	Transvaal	Piet Koornhof	NP
Prinshof	Transvaal	Jimmy Kruger	NP
Queenstown	Cape	Jan Jurie Loots	NP
Randburg	Transvaal	Wynand Malan	NP
Randfontein	Transvaal	Connie Mulder	NP
Rissik	Transvaal	Daniël Klopper van der Merwe	NP
Rondebosch	Cape	Frederik van Zyl Slabbert	PFP
Roodepoort	Transvaal	Willem Jacobus Cuyler	NP
Rosettenville	Transvaal	Helgard Michal Janse van Rensburg	NP
Rustenburg	Transvaal	Paul Bodenstein	NP
Sandton	Transvaal	David Dalling	PFP
Sasolburg	Free State	Johannes Hendrik Bruwer Ungerer	NP
Schweizer-Reneke	Transvaal	Hendrik Johannes Douw van der Walt	NP
Sea Point	Cape	Colin Eglin	PFP
Simonstown	Cape	John Wiley	SAP
Smithfield	Free State	Charles Henry Whellan Simkin	NP
Somerset East	Cape	Stephanus Johannes Hofmeyr van der Spuy	NP
South Coast	Natal	Jeremias Jacobus Nel van der Westhuizen	NP
Soutpansberg	Transvaal	Stephanus Petrus Botha	NP
Springs	Transvaal	G. T. Geldenhuys	NP
Standerton	Transvaal	Willem Jozef Hefer	NP
Stellenbosch	Cape	Hendrik Hanekom Smit	NP
Stilfontein	Transvaal	Willem Johannes Christiaan Rossouw	NP
Sunnyside	Transvaal	Jan Johannes Benjamin van Zyl	NP
Swellendam	Cape	Jacobus Johannes Malan	NP
Turffontein	Transvaal	Marais Steyn	NP
Tygervallei	Cape	Alexander van Breda	NP
Uitenhage	Cape	Jan Gideon Swiegers	NP
Umbilo	Natal	Geoffrey Norman Oldfield	NRP
Umhlanga	Natal	Brian William Bromley Page	NRP
Umhlatuzana	Natal	Nicolaas Jacobus Pretorius	NP
Umlazi	Natal	Cornelius Botha	NP
Vanderbijlpark	Transvaal	Johannes Marthinus Henning	NP
Vasco	Cape	Johann Hendrik Heyns	NP
Vereeniging	Transvaal	F. W. de Klerk	NP
Verwoerdburg	Transvaal	Adriaan Vlok	NP
Virginia	Free State	Petrus Johannes Clase	NP
Von Brandis	Transvaal	Robert Badenhorst Durrant	NP
Vryburg	Cape	Johannes Petrus du Toit	NP
Vryheid	Natal	Josua Pieter Christiaan le Roux	NP
Walmer	Cape	Theodore Aronson	SAP
Waterberg	Transvaal	Andries Treurnicht	NP
Waterkloof	Transvaal	Thomas Langley	NP
Welkom	Free State	Michiel Wilhelm de Wet	NP
Westdene	Transvaal	Pik Botha	NP
Winburg	Free State	Daniel Benjamin Scott	NP
Witbank	Transvaal	Teunis Nicolaas Hendrik Janson	NP
Witwatersberg	Transvaal	Johannes Cornelius Bothma Schoeman	NP
Wonderboom	Transvaal	Daniel Wynand Steyn	NP
Worcester	Cape	Pieter Daniel Palm	NP
Wynberg	Cape	Philip Albert Myburgh	PFP
Yeoville	Transvaal	Harry Schwarz	PFP
