= 18th South African Parliament =

←	17th	19th	→
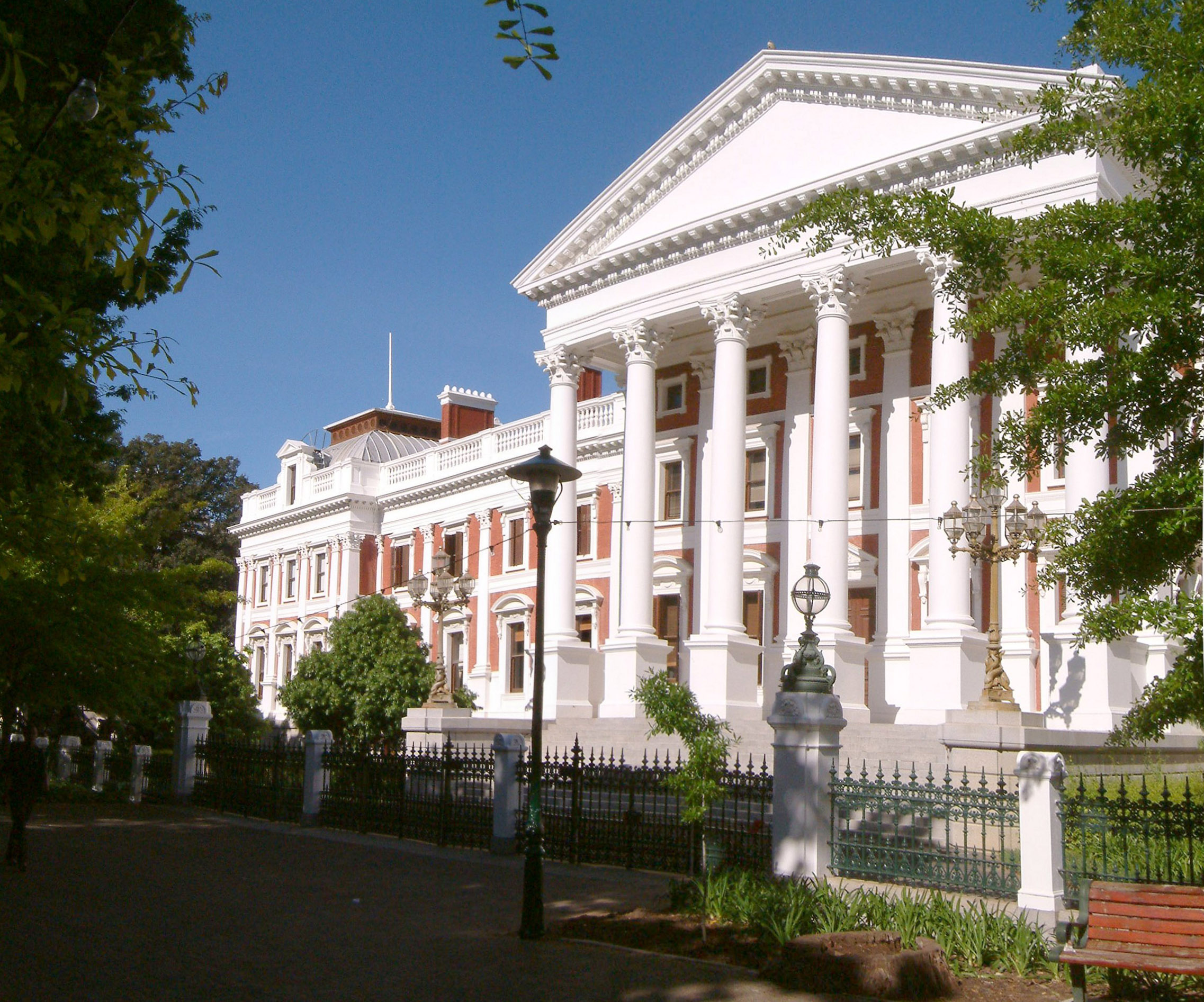
- Houses of Parliament, Cape Town

Overview
- Jurisdiction: South Africa
- Meeting place: Cape Town

House of Assembly of South Africa
- Composition of the House of Assembly
- Members: 165
- Speaker of the House of Assembly of South Africa: Jannie Loots (until 30 July 1981) J.P. du Toit (31 July 1981 – 13 February 1983) Johan Greeff (final)
- Leader of the Opposition: Frederik van Zyl Slabbert

The 18th South African Parliament was the eighteenth Parliament of South Africa to convene since the unification of South Africa in 1910 and the sixth to convene since the adoption of the republican constitution in 1961. It was elected in the 1981 South African general election and consisted of the unicameral House of Assembly. The House of Assembly contained 165 members.

Three parties were represented in this parliament: the National Party (NP), the Progressive Federal Party (PFP), and the New Republic Party (NRP). The National Party retained a diminished majority: it won 131 of the 165 seats, a decrease from the 134 seats it held in the 17th Parliament.

== Summary by province ==
The table below gives the number of registered voters (all of whom were classified as white under the apartheid legislation) and parliamentary seats, on the day of the election, broken down by province. The provinces are those which existed prior to 1994.

Province	Number of seats	Number of voters
Cape	55	686,738
Natal	20	264,199
Orange Free State	14	178,099
Transvaal	76	1,161,590
Total	165	2,290,626

== Parties represented ==
Party	Seats
National Party	131
Progressive Federal Party	26
New Republic Party	8

== Members of Parliament ==
The following is a list of MPs elected in the 1981 general election to the 18th Parliament, which sat until the 1987 general election.

Constituency	Province	Name	Party
Albany	Cape	Moorcroft, Errol	PFP
Alberton	Transvaal	Ligthelm, C.J.	NP
Algoa	Cape	Kleynhans, J.W.	NP
Aliwal	Cape	Greeff, J.W.	NP
Amanzimtoti	Natal	Bartlett, G.S.	NRP
Barberton	Transvaal	Uys, C.	NP
Beaufort West	Cape	Poggenpoel, D.J.	NP
Bellville	Cape	Van der Walt, A.T.	NP
Benoni	Transvaal	Rencken, C.R.E.	NP
Berea	Natal	Swart, R.A.F.	PFP
Bethal	Transvaal	Wentzel, Greyling	NP
Bethlehem	Free State	Van der Merwe, C.V.	NP
Bezuidenhout	Transvaal	Sive, R.	PFP
Bloemfontein East	Free State	Van der Walt, Dr L.	NP
Bloemfontein North	Free State	Terblanche, G.P.D.	NP
Bloemfontein West	Free State	Coetsee, Kobie	NP
Boksburg	Transvaal	Blanché, Sakkie	NP
Brakpan	Transvaal	Le Roux, F.J.	NP
Brentwood	Transvaal	Van Zyl, J.G.	NP
Brits	Transvaal	Grobler, Dr J.P.	NP
Bryanston	Transvaal	Van Rensburg, H.E.J.	PFP
Caledon	Cape	Fick, L.H.	NP
Cape Town Gardens	Cape	Andrew, Ken	PFP
Carletonville	Transvaal	Landman, W.J.	NP
Ceres	Cape	Hugo, P.B.B.	NP
Claremont	Cape	Slabbert, Frederik van Zyl	PFP
Constantia	Cape	Hulley, P.R.	PFP
Cradock	Cape	Morrison, G.de V.	NP
De Aar	Cape	Van Heerden, R.F.	NP
De Kuilen	Cape	Streicher, Myburgh	NP
Delmas	Transvaal	Schoeman, H.	NP
Durban Central	Natal	Gastrow, P.H.P.	PFP
Durban North	Natal	Miller, R.B.	NRP
Durban Point	Natal	Raw, Vause	NRP
Durbanville	Cape	Munnik, L.A.P.A.	NP
East London City	Cape	De Pontes, P.	NP
East London North	Cape	Coetzer, H.S.	NP
Edenvale	Transvaal	Goodall, B.B.	PFP
Ermelo	Transvaal	Tempel, H.J.	NP
False Bay	Cape	Albertyn, Jacobus	NP
Fauresmith	Free State	Olivier, P.J.S.	NP
Florida	Transvaal	Du Plessis, Barend	NP
Geduld	Transvaal	De Beer, Sam	NP
George	Cape	Botha, P. W.	NP
Germiston	Transvaal	Van Eeden, D.S.	NP
Germiston District	Transvaal	Scholtz, E.M.	NP
Gezina	Transvaal	Swanepoel, K.D.	NP
Gordonia	Cape	Van Wyk, J.A.	NP
Graaff-Reinet	Cape	Hayward, S.A.S.	NP
Green Point	Cape	Van der Merwe, S.S.	PFP
Greytown	Natal	Cronjé, P.C.	PFP
Groote Schuur	Cape	Bamford, B.R.	PFP
Heilbron	Free State	Terblanche, A.J.W.P.S.	NP
Helderberg	Cape	Heunis, Chris	NP
Helderkruin	Transvaal	Van der Merwe, C.J.	NP
Hercules	Transvaal	Van Vuuren, L.M.J.	NP
Hillbrow	Transvaal	Widman, A.B.	PFP
Houghton	Transvaal	Suzman, Helen	PFP
Humansdorp	Cape	Meyer, W.D.	NP
Innesdal	Transvaal	Nothnagel, A.E.	NP
Jeppe	Transvaal	Van der Merwe, Koos	NP
Johannesburg North	Transvaal	Marais, J.F.	PFP
Johannesburg West	Transvaal	Meyer, Roelf	NP
Kempton Park	Transvaal	Du Plessis, G.C.	NP
Kimberley North	Cape	De Jager, A.M.van A.	NP
Kimberley South	Cape	Niemann, Keppies	NP
King William's Town	Cape	Rogers, P.R.C.	NRP
Klerksdorp	Transvaal	Venter, A.A.	NP
Klip River	Natal	Volker, V.A.	NP
Koedoespoort	Transvaal	Van Staden, F.A.H.	NP
Kroonstad	Free State	Breytenbach, Wynand	NP
Krugersdorp	Transvaal	Wessels, Leon	NP
Kuruman	Cape	Hoon, J.H.	NP
Ladybrand	Free State	Van den Berg, J.C.	NP
Langlaagte	Transvaal	Barnard, S.P.	NP
Lichtenburg	Transvaal	Hartzenberg, Ferdi	NP
Losberg	Transvaal	Wright, A.P.	NP
Lydenburg	Transvaal	Du Plessis, P.T.C.	NP
Maitland	Cape	Durr, Kent	NP
Malmesbury	Cape	Kotzé, G.J.	NP
Maraisburg	Transvaal	Pretorius, P.H.	NP
Meyerton	Transvaal	Van der Merwe, W.L.	NP
Middelburg	Transvaal	Ligthelm, N.W.	NP
Modderfontein	Transvaal	Malan, Magnus	NP
Mooi River	Natal	Hardingham, R.W.	NRP
Mossel Bay	Cape	Van Rensburg, H.M.J.	NP
Namaqualand	Cape	Louw, E.van der M.	NP
Nelspruit	Transvaal	Maré, P.L.	NP
Newcastle	Natal	Schoeman, W.J.	NP
Newton Park	Cape	Delport, W.H.	NP
Nigel	Transvaal	Visagie, J.H.	NP
North Rand	Transvaal	Schoeman, J.C.B.	NP
Oudtshoorn	Cape	Badenhorst, P.J.	NP
Overvaal	Transvaal	Ballot, G.C.	NP
Paarl	Cape	Meiring, J.W.H.	NP
Parktown	Transvaal	Barnard, M.S.	PFP
Parow	Cape	Kotzé, S.F.	NP
Parys	Free State	Kotzé, W.D.	NP
Pietermaritzburg North	Natal	McIntosch, G.B.D.	PFP
Pietermaritzburg South	Natal	Tarr, M.A.	PFP
Pietersburg	Transvaal	Snyman, W.J.	NP
Piketberg	Cape	Kotzé, D.A.	NP
Pinelands	Cape	Boraine, Alex	PFP
Pinetown	Natal	Pitman, S.A.	PFP
Port Elizabeth Central	Cape	Malcomess, D.J.N.	PFP
Port Elizabeth North	Cape	Van der Linde, G.J.	NP
Port Natal	Natal	Cronjé, P.	NP
Potchefstroom	Transvaal	Le Grange, Louis	NP
Potgietersrus	Transvaal	Golden, S.G.A.	NP
Pretoria Central	Transvaal	Nel, D.J.L.	NP
Pretoria East	Transvaal	Alant, Theo	NP
Pretoria West	Transvaal	Le Roux, Z.P.	NP
Prieska	Cape	Van Niekerk, A.I.	NP
Primrose	Transvaal	Koornhof, Piet	NP
Queenstown	Cape	Louw, M.H.	NP
Randburg	Transvaal	Malan, W.C.	NP
Randfontein	Transvaal	Geldenhuys, Boy	NP
Rissik	Transvaal	Van der Merwe, H.D.K.	NP
Roodeplaat	Transvaal	Lloyd, J.J.	NP
Roodepoort	Transvaal	Cuyler, W.J.	NP
Rosettenville	Transvaal	Van Rensburg, H.M.J.	NP
Rustenburg	Transvaal	Veldman, M.H.	NP
Sandton	Transvaal	Dalling, David	PFP
Sasolburg	Free State	Ungerer, J.H.B.	NP
Schweizer-Reneke	Transvaal	Lemmer, W.A.	NP
Sea Point	Cape	Eglin, Colin	PFP
Simonstown	Cape	Wiley, John	NP
Smithfield	Free State	Simkin, C.H.W.	NP
South Coast	Natal	Thompson, A.G.	NRP
Soutpansberg	Transvaal	Botha, S.P.	NP
Springs	Transvaal	Van der Merwe, G.J.	NP
Standerton	Transvaal	Hefer, W.J.	NP
Stellenbosch	Cape	Smit, Hon. H.H.	NP
Stilfontein	Transvaal	Cunningham, J.H.	NP
Sundays River	Cape	Conradie, F.D.	NP
Sunnyside	Transvaal	Van Zyl, J.J.B.	NP
Swellendam	Cape	Geldenhuys, A.	NP
Turffontein	Transvaal	Fourie, L.H.	NP
Tygervallei	Cape	Van Breda, A.	NP
Uitenhage	Cape	Le Roux, D.E.T.	NP
Umbilo	Natal	Watterson, D.W.	NRP
Umfolozi	Natal	Heine, W.J.	NP
Umhlanga	Natal	Page, B.W.B.	NRP
Umhlatuzana	Natal	Pretorius, N.J.	NP
Umlazi	Natal	Botha, Cornelius	NP
Vanderbijlpark	Transvaal	Viljoen, Gerrit	NP
Vasco	Cape	Heyns, J.H.	NP
Ventersdorp	Transvaal	Wilkens, B.H.	NP
Vereeniging	Transvaal	De Klerk, F. W.	NP
Verwoerdburg	Transvaal	Vlok, Adriaan	NP
Virginia	Free State	Clase, P.J.	NP
Vryburg	Cape	Du Toit, J.P.	NP
Vryheid	Natal	Mentz, Jurie	NP
Walmer	Cape	Savage, A.	PFP
Waterberg	Transvaal	Treurnicht, Andries	NP
Waterkloof	Transvaal	Langley, T.	NP
Welkom	Free State	Weeber, A.	NP
Wellington	Cape	Malherbe, G.J.	NP
Westdene	Transvaal	Botha, Pik	NP
Winburg	Free State	Scott, D.B.	NP
Witbank	Transvaal	Fouché, A.F.	NP
Wonderboom	Transvaal	Steyn, D. W.	NP
Worcester	Cape	Rabie, J.	NP
Wynberg	Cape	Myburgh, P.A.	PFP
Yeoville	Transvaal	Schwarz, Harry	PFP
