= Meyerton =

Meyerton may refer to:

- Meyerton, Gauteng, South Africa
  - Meyerton (House of Assembly of South Africa constituency)
- Meyerton, Baker Island, United States Minor Outlying Islands (Pacific Ocean)
