= Alberton =

Alberton may refer to:

== Australia ==
- Alberton, Queensland, a rural locality in the City of Gold Coast
- Alberton, South Australia
- Alberton, Tasmania
- Alberton, Victoria

== Canada ==
- Alberton, Ontario
- Alberton, Prince Edward Island

== New Zealand ==
- Alberton, Auckland, a colonial house in Mount Albert, Auckland, registered as a Category I heritage item with the New Zealand Historic Places Trust

== South Africa ==
- Alberton, Gauteng
  - Alberton (House of Assembly of South Africa constituency)

== United States ==
- Alberton, Maryland
- Alberton, Montana
