= Nelspruit (House of Assembly of South Africa constituency) =

South African constituency, 1910–1994

- Nelspruit
- Former constituency for the South African House of Assembly
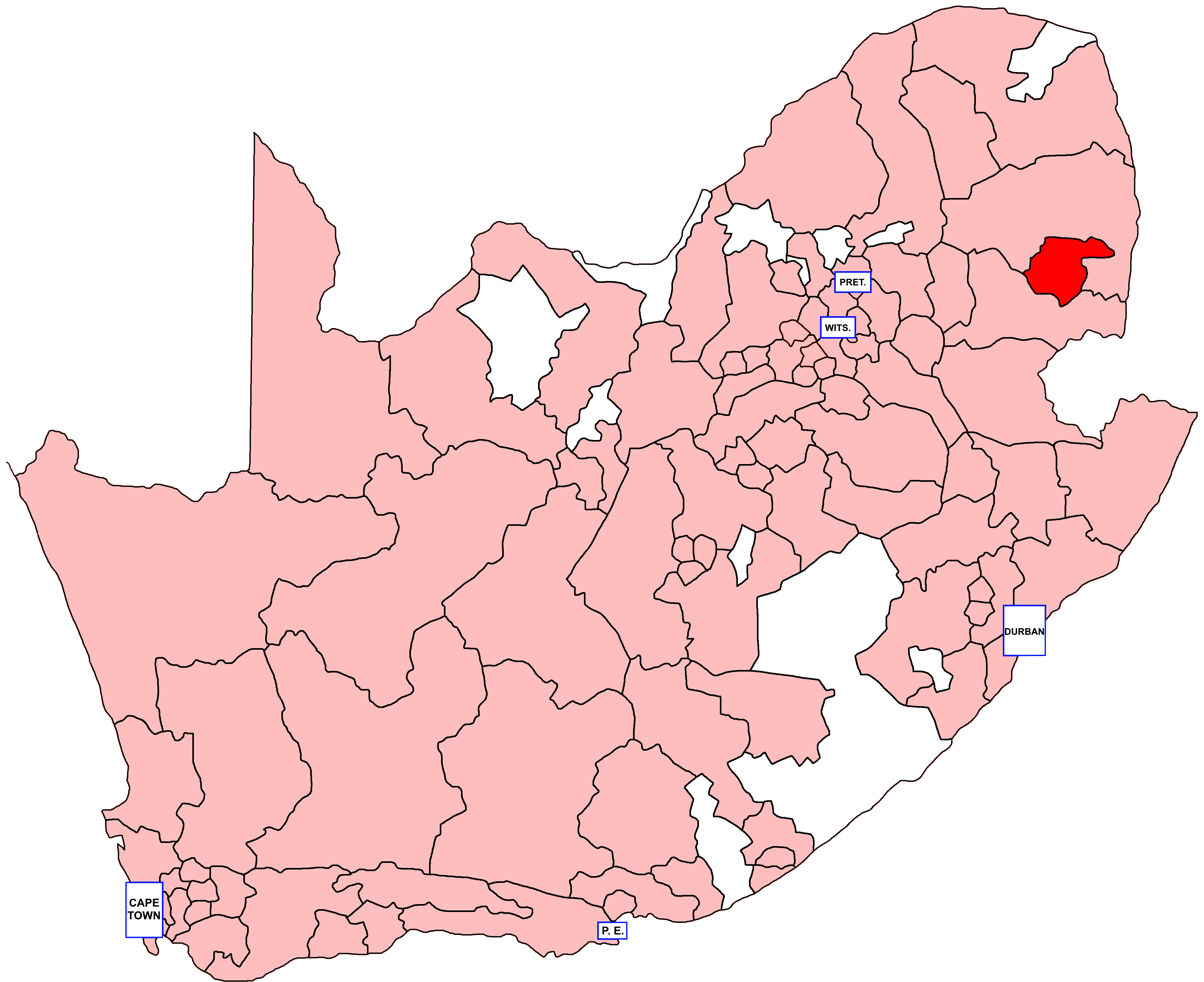
- Location of Nelspruit within South Africa (1981)
- Province: Transvaal
- Major settlements: Nelspruit

Former constituency
- Created: 1910
- Abolished: 1994
- Number of members: 1
- Replaced by: North West

Nelspruit was a constituency in the Transvaal Province of South Africa, which existed from 1910 to 1994. Named for the city of Nelspruit, throughout its existence it elected one member to the House of Assembly.

== Members ==
Election	Parliament	Member	Party	Ref.
1977	17th South African Parliament	Abraham Jacobus Raubenheimer	NP	
1981	18th South African Parliament	Pieter Ludolf Maré	NP	
1989	21st South African Parliament	Pieter Ludolf Maré	NP	
