= Florida (House of Assembly of South Africa constituency) =

South African constituency, 1910–1994

- Florida
- Former constituency for the South African House of Assembly
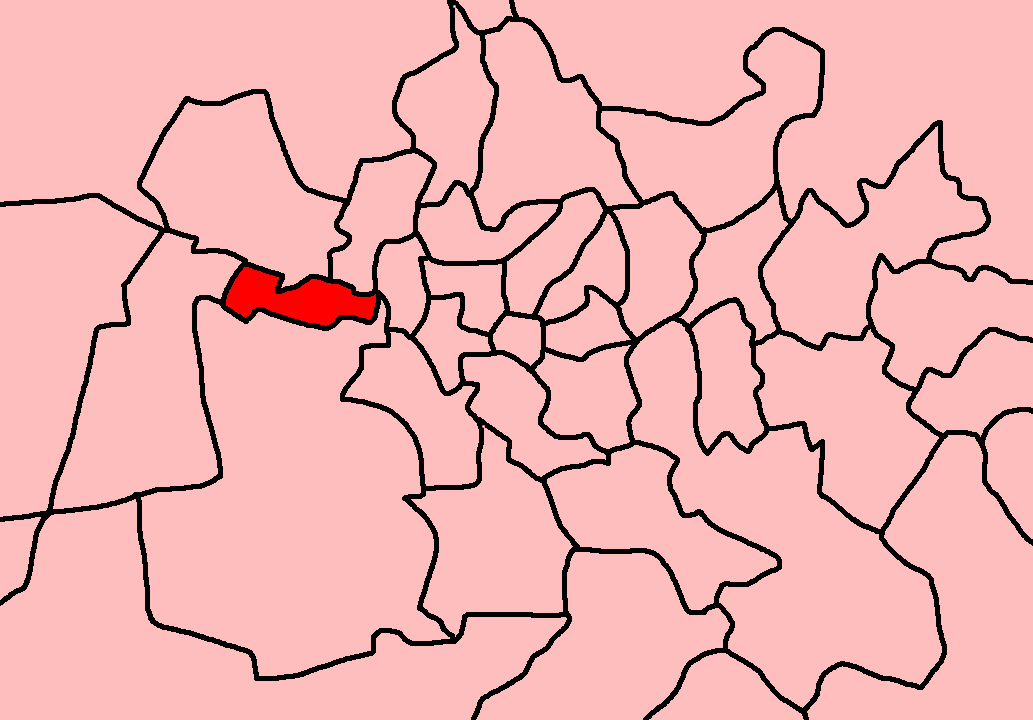
- Location of Florida within Johannesburg (1981)
- Province: Transvaal
- Major settlements: Florida

Former constituency
- Created: 1910
- Abolished: 1994
- Number of members: 1
- Replaced by: North West

Florida was a constituency in the Transvaal Province of South Africa, which existed from 1910 to 1994. Named for the Roodepoort suburb of Florida, throughout its existence it elected one member to the House of Assembly. It was represented for multiple terms by Barend du Plessis.

== Members ==
Election	Parliament	Member	Party	Ref.
1977	17th South African Parliament	Barend du Plessis	NP	
1981	18th South African Parliament	Barend du Plessis	NP	
1989	21st South African Parliament	Barend du Plessis	NP	
