= Innesdal (House of Assembly of South Africa constituency) =

South African constituency, 1910–1994

- Innesdal
- Former constituency for the South African House of Assembly
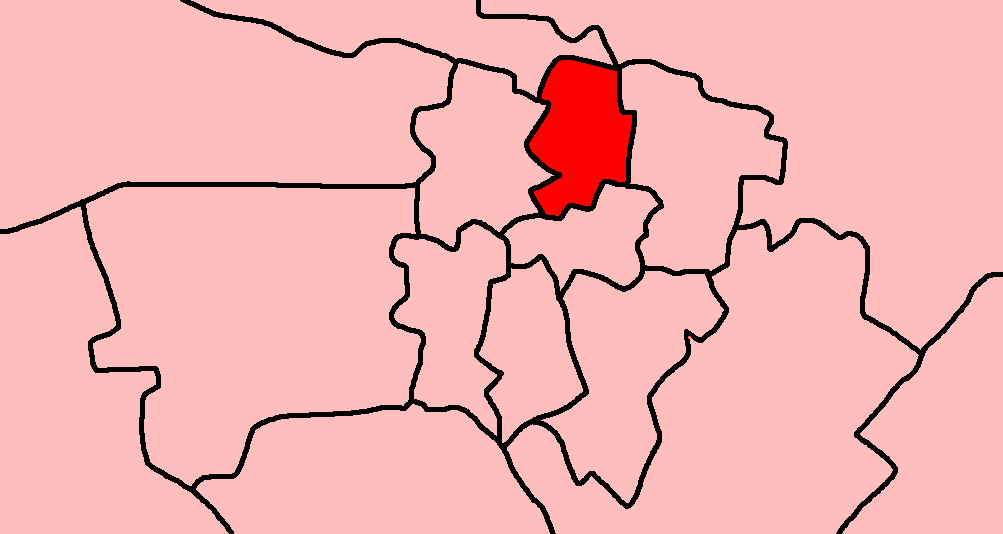
- Location of Innesdal within Pretoria (1981)
- Province: Transvaal

Former constituency
- Created: 1910
- Abolished: 1994
- Number of members: 1
- Replaced by: North West

Innesdal was a constituency in the Transvaal Province of South Africa, which existed from 1910 to 1994. Named for the Innesdal area of Pretoria, throughout its existence it elected one member to the House of Assembly.

== Members ==
Election	Parliament	Member	Party	Ref.
1977	17th South African Parliament	Albertus Erik Nothnagel	NP	
1981	18th South African Parliament	Albertus Erik Nothnagel	NP	
1987				
1987				
1989	21st South African Parliament	Rina Venter	NP	

== Referendum results ==
Referendum	Constituency	For		Against		Invalid/ blank	Total	Registered voters	Turnout
1960 South African republic referendum	Innesdal	8,283	72.70	3,110	27.30	26	11,419	12,566	90.87
