= Rina Venter =

South African government official

Dr Rina Venter

Minister of Health
- In office 1989–1994
- President: F. W. de Klerk
- Preceded by: Willie van Niekerk
- Succeeded by: Nkosazana Dlamini-Zuma

Personal details
- Born: Elizabeth Hendrina Stapelberg; 9 December 1938 (age 87)
- Spouse: H. S. Venter

Elizabeth Hendrina Venter (née Stapelberg; born 9 December 1938), known as Rina Venter, was the Minister of National Health and Population Development of South Africa, from 1989 to 1994.

Venter graduated from Pretoria University and was a social worker for 20 years. She was elected to the House of Assembly of South Africa for Innesdal. She served in the National Party government of F. W. de Klerk, and was the first woman in South African history to hold a cabinet post. She retired from politics in 1994.

== Desegregation ==
On 17 May 1990, Venter announced that South Africa's health system would begin desegregation. South Africa's 240 state hospitals became available to all races, although with less-than-optimal implementation.

== Anti-tobacco ==
Under pressure from opposition political parties, Venter publicly committed in 1991 to investigate tobacco legislation. The Apartheid government had vested interests in the tobacco industry, and would therefore be reluctant to introduce restrictions, so she enlisted the help of the civil society Tobacco Action Group, in order to bolster media and public support for anti-smoking efforts.

After consulting with pro- and anti-tobacco lobbyists, Venter decided to introduce the Control of Smoking and Advertising of Tobacco Products Draft Bill, which would give her the power to restrict smoking in certain public places, would make it an offense to sell cigarettes to people under 16, and would further introduce restrictions such as health warnings on advertisements for tobacco products.

The bill reemerged in 1992 as the Tobacco Products Control Bill, and was delayed until 1993 by the government. It was finally approved by Parliament on 17 June 1993.

Venter received recognition for her work to curb tobacco use with an award by the American Cancer Society.

== HIV/AIDS ==
Her department formulated a comprehensive and detailed plan for responding to the nascent AIDS pandemic, which was however hampered by lack of funding. She has criticized her successors for abandoning this plan.
