= Hillbrow (House of Assembly of South Africa constituency) =

South African constituency, 1910–1994

- Hillbrow
- Former constituency for the South African House of Assembly
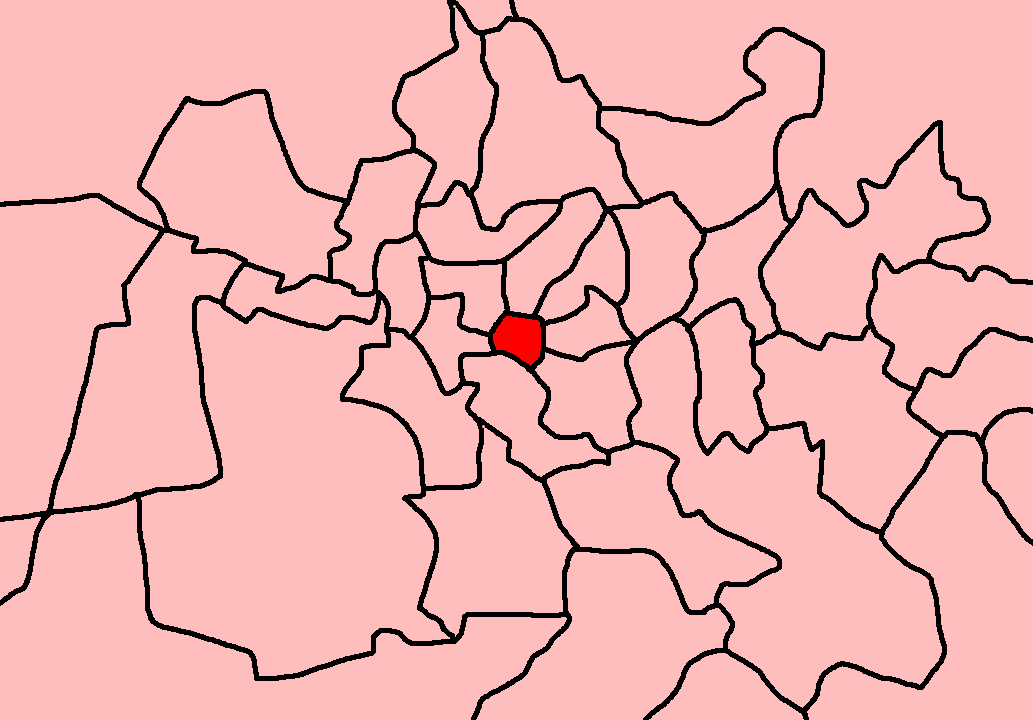
- Location of Hillbrow within Johannesburg (1981)
- Province: Transvaal
- Major settlements: Hillbrow

Former constituency
- Created: 1910
- Abolished: 1994
- Number of members: 1
- Replaced by: North West

Hillbrow was a constituency in the Transvaal Province of South Africa, which existed from 1910 to 1994. Named for the inner city district of Hillbrow, throughout its existence it elected one member to the House of Assembly.

== Members ==
Election	Parliament	Member	Party	Ref.
1981	18th South African Parliament	A.B. Widman	PFP	
1989	21st South African Parliament	Lester Fuchs	DP	
