= Boy Geldenhuys =

South African politician (born 1941)

Member of the National Assembly
- In office May 1994 – April 2004
- Constituency: Gauteng

Personal details
- Born: 28 November 1941 (age 84)
- Citizenship: South Africa
- Party: New National Party; National Party

Barend Leendert "Boy" Geldenhuys (born 28 November 1941) is a retired South African politician and diplomat who represented the National Party (NP) and New National Party (NNP) in the National Assembly from 1994 to 2004. He served as the leader of the NNP caucus from 2002 to 2004. After losing his seat in the 2004 general election, he was appointed as South African Ambassador to Jordan. A former minister in the Dutch Reformed Church, Geldenhuys also represented the NP in the apartheid-era House of Assembly.

== Early life and career ==
Geldenhuys was born on 28 November 1941. He was formerly a minister at NG Gemeente Randpoort, a Dutch Reformed Church congregation in Randfontein in the former Transvaal. He later represented the NP in the House of Assembly for the constituency of Brentwood.

== Post-apartheid career ==
In the 1994 general election, South Africa's first post-apartheid elections, Geldenhuys was elected to an NP seat in the new National Assembly. He remained with the party when it was restyled as the NNP and he was re-elected to his seat under the NNP banner in the 1999 general election; he represented the Gauteng constituency.

In 2000, when the NNP joined the Democratic Alliance (DA), a multi-party coalition in opposition, Geldenhuys was appointed as the DA's spokesperson on safety and security. However, after the NNP split from the DA, Geldenhuys remained with his former party; in June 2002, he was appointed leader of the NNP's parliamentary caucus, despite expectations that the position would go to Sheila Camerer. He remained in that position until the end of the legislative term in 2004. In addition, in early 2004, the National Assembly selected Geldenhuys as one of its five delegates to the Pan-African Parliament.

Geldenhuys stood for re-election in the 2004 general election but the NNP performed very poorly and he lost his seat. In the aftermath of the election, when the NNP agreed to merge into the governing African National Congress (ANC), it was reported that Geldenhuys was likely to be awarded an ambassadorial post as part of the deal. His appointment as South African Ambassador to Jordan was announced in late August 2004.

== Personal life ==
Geldenhuys is married to Callie Geldenhuys, an artist. They live in Fish Hoek, Cape Town and have adult children.
