= Edenvale (House of Assembly of South Africa constituency) =

South African constituency, 1910–1994

- Edenvale
- Former constituency for the South African House of Assembly
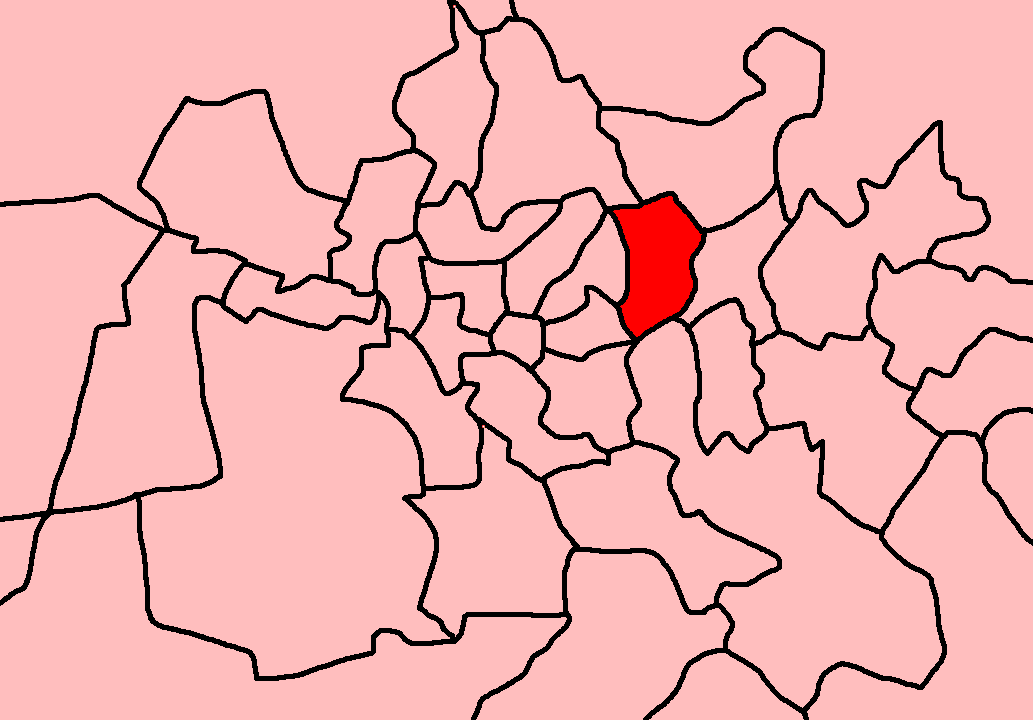
- Location of Edenvale within Johannesburg (1981)
- Province: Transvaal
- Major settlements: Edenvale

Former constituency
- Created: 1910
- Abolished: 1994
- Number of members: 1
- Replaced by: North West

Edenvale was a constituency in the Transvaal Province of South Africa, which existed from 1910 to 1994. Named for the town of Edenvale, throughout its existence it elected one member to the House of Assembly.

== Members ==
Election	Parliament	Member	Party	Ref.
1989	21st South African Parliament	Brian Bradford Goodall	DP	
