= Kimberley North (House of Assembly of South Africa constituency) =

South African constituency, 1910–1994

- Kimberley Noord
- Former constituency for the South African House of Assembly
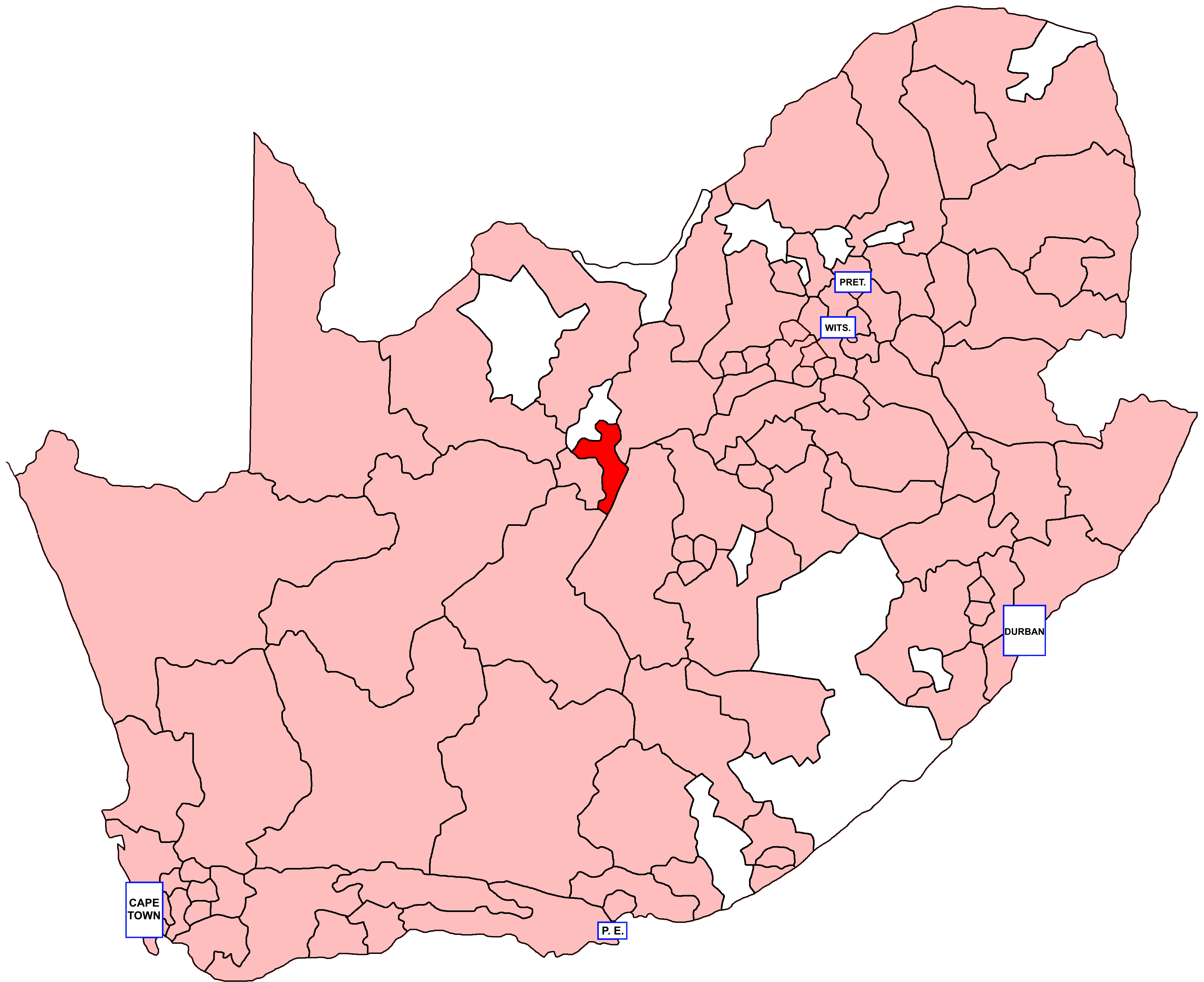
- Location of Kimberley North within South Africa (1981)
- District: Kimberley, South Africa
- Province: Cape Province

Former constituency
- Created: 1910
- Abolished: 1994
- Number of members: 1
- Replaced by: Northern Cape

Kimberley North was a constituency in the Cape Province of South Africa, which existed from 1910 to 1994. Named for the town of Kimberley, throughout its existence it elected one member to the House of Assembly.

== Members ==
Election	Parliament	Member	Party	Ref.
1989	21st South African Parliament	Jan Antonie Brazelle	NP	
