= Mooi River (House of Assembly of South Africa constituency) =

South African constituency, 1910–1994

- Mooirivier
- Former constituency for the South African House of Assembly
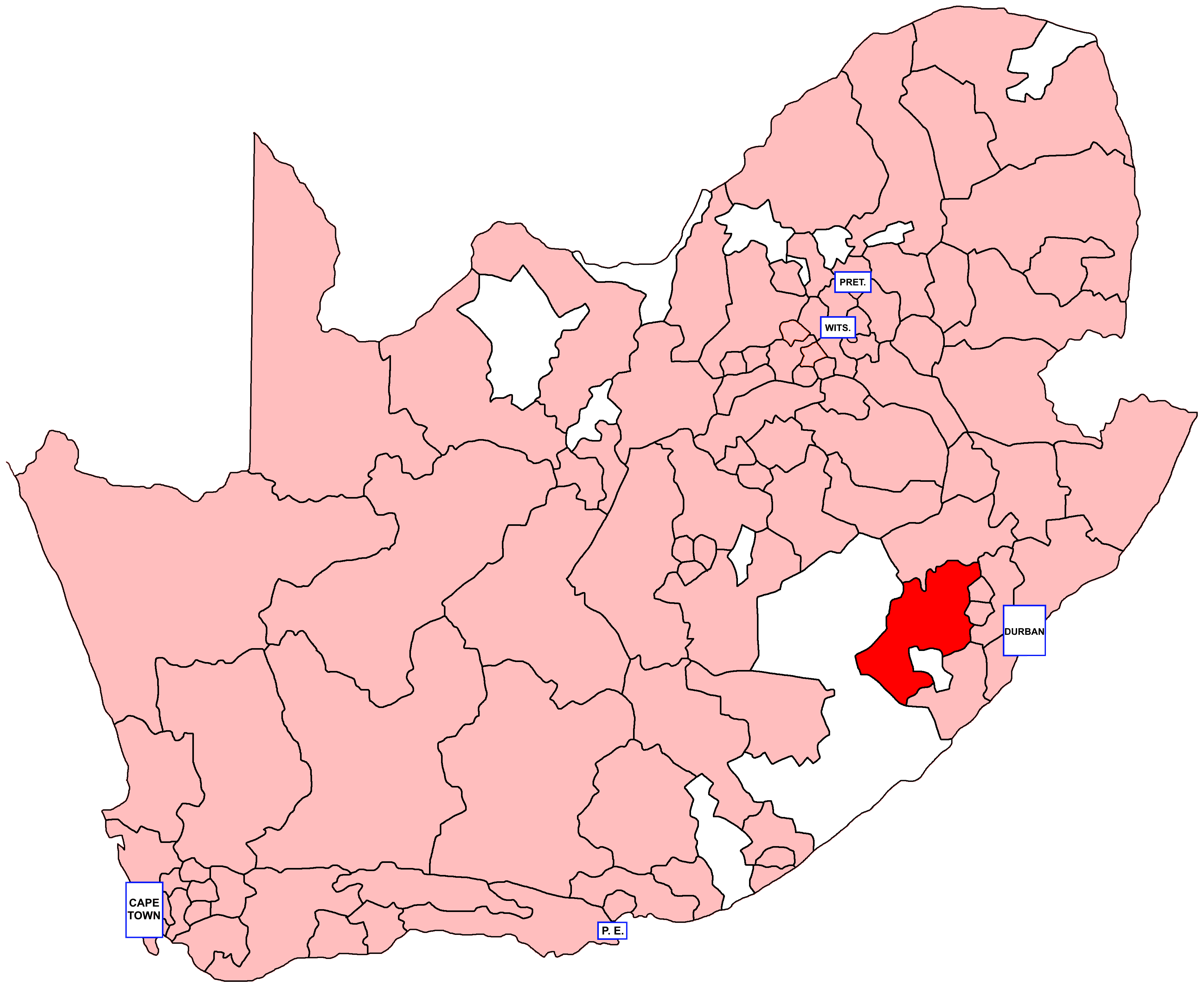
- Location of Mooi River within South Africa (1981)
- Province: Natal
- Major settlements: Mooi River

Former constituency
- Created: 1910
- Abolished: 1994
- Number of members: 1
- Replaced by: KwaZulu-Natal

Mooi River was a constituency in the Natal Province of South Africa, which existed from 1910 to 1994. Named for the town of Mooi River, throughout its existence it elected one member to the House of Assembly.

== Members ==
Election	Parliament	Member	Party	Ref.
1989	21st South African Parliament	Wessel Uys Nel	DP	
