= Overvaal (House of Assembly of South Africa constituency) =

South African constituency, 1910–1994

- Overvaal
- Former constituency for the South African House of Assembly
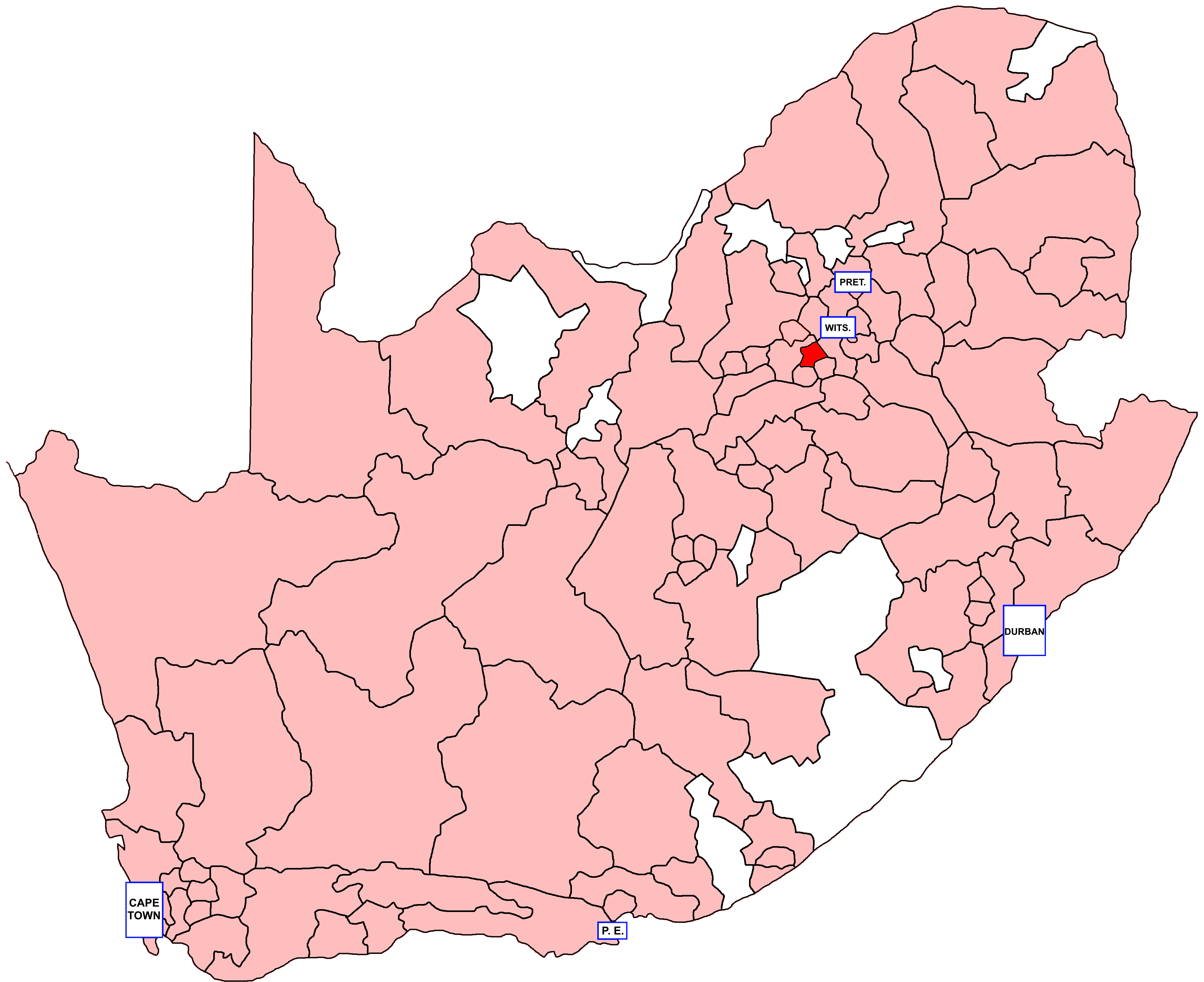
- Location of Overvaal within Johannesburg (1981)
- Province: Transvaal

Former constituency
- Created: 1910
- Abolished: 1994
- Number of members: 1
- Replaced by: North West

Overvaal was a constituency in the Transvaal Province of South Africa, which existed from 1910 to 1994. It elected one member to the House of Assembly.

== Members ==
Election	Parliament	Member	Party	Ref.
1989	21st South African Parliament	Koos van der Merwe	CP	
