= Carletonville (House of Assembly of South Africa constituency) =

South African constituency, 1910–1994

- Carletonville
- Former constituency for the South African House of Assembly
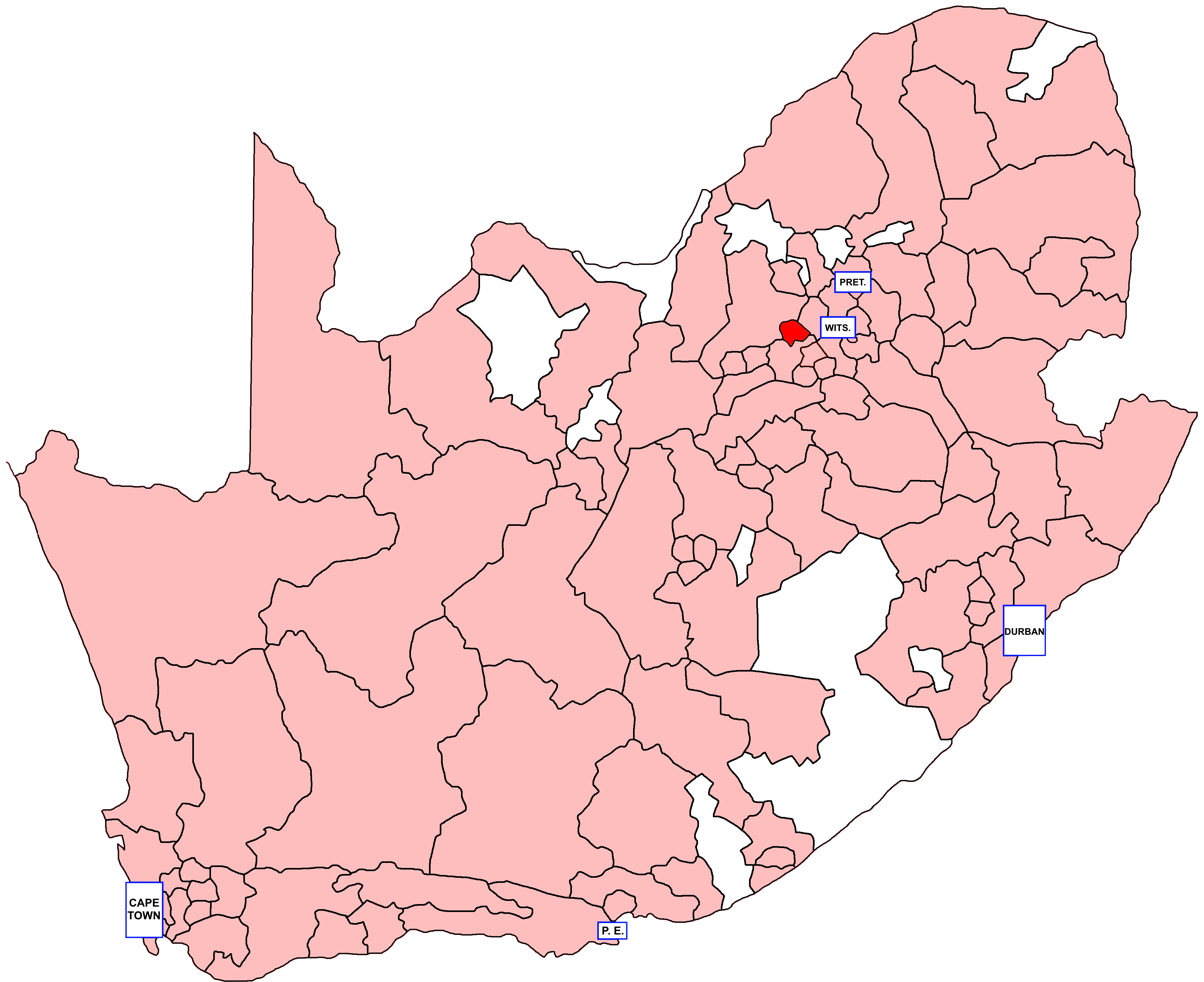
- Location of Carletonville within South Africa (1981)
- Province: Transvaal
- Major settlements: Carletonville

Former constituency
- Created: 1910
- Abolished: 1994
- Number of members: 1
- Replaced by: North West

Carletonville was a constituency in the Transvaal Province of South Africa, which existed from 1910 to 1994. Named for the town of Carletonville, throughout its existence it elected one member to the House of Assembly.

== Members ==
Election	Parliament	Member	Party	Ref.
1989	21st South African Parliament	Arrie Paulus	CP	
