= Jacobus Albertyn =

South African politician

Member of the National Assembly
- In office May 1994 – June 1999

Personal details
- Citizenship: South Africa
- Party: National Party

Jacobus Theron Albertyn is a South African politician who represented the National Party (NP) in the National Assembly from 1994 to 1999, having gained election to his seat in the 1994 general election. He formerly represented the NP in the apartheid-era House of Assembly, serving the False Bay constituency.
