= Virginia (House of Assembly of South Africa constituency) =

South African constituency, 1910–1994

- Virginia
- Former constituency for the South African House of Assembly
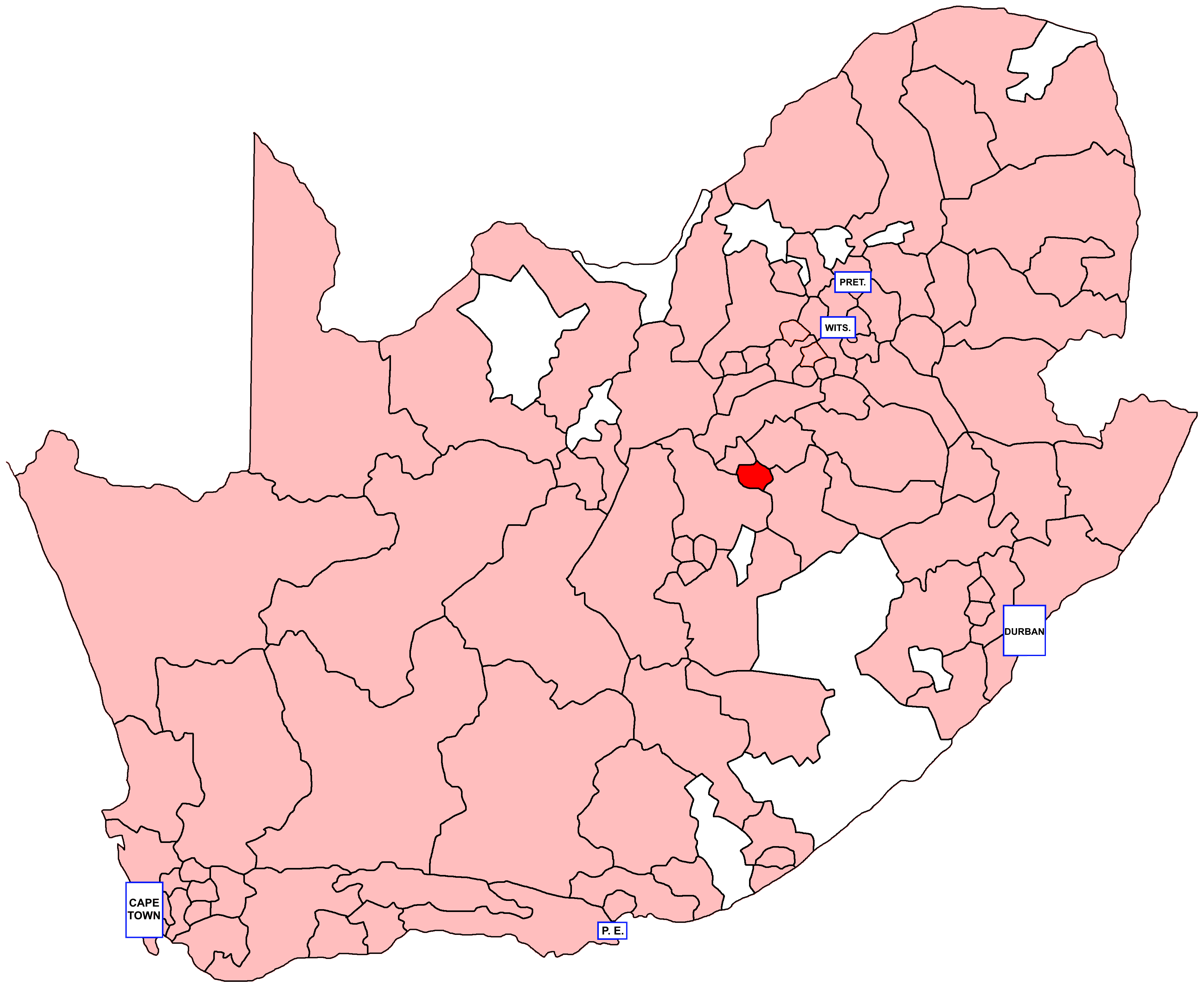
- Location of Virginia within South Africa (1981)
- Province: Free State
- Major settlements: Virginia

Former constituency
- Created: 1910
- Abolished: 1994
- Number of members: 1
- Replaced by: Free State

Virginia was a constituency in the Orange Free State province of South Africa, which existed from 1910 to 1994. Named for the town of Virginia, throughout its existence it elected one member to the House of Assembly.

== Members ==
Election	Parliament	Member	Party	Ref.
1989	21st South African Parliament	Petrus Johannes Clase	NP	
