= Vanderbijlpark (House of Assembly of South Africa constituency) =

South African constituency, 1910–1994

- Vanderbijlpark
- Former constituency for the South African House of Assembly
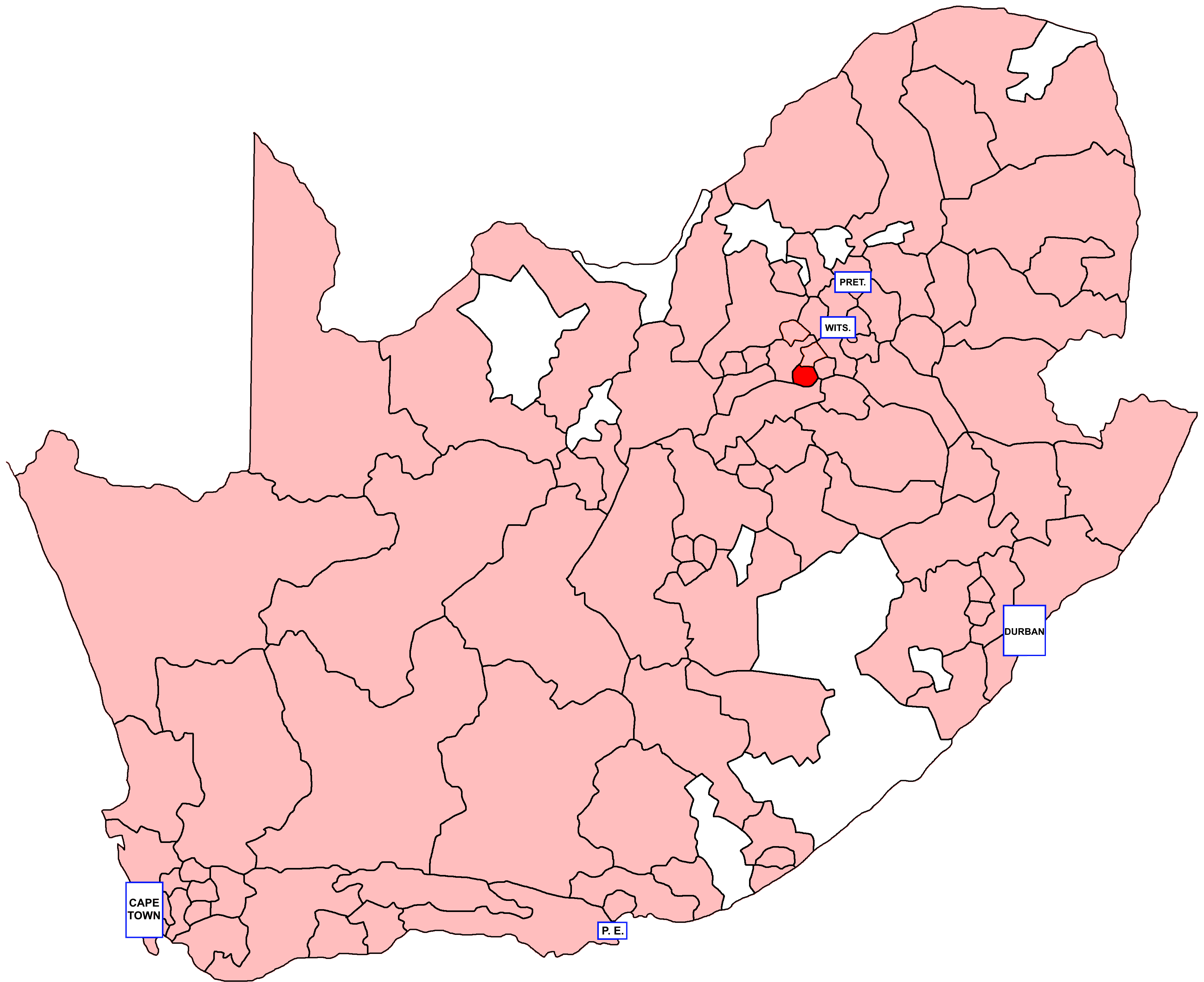
- Location of Vanderbijlpark within South Africa (1981)
- Province: Transvaal
- Major settlements: Vanderbijlpark

Former constituency
- Created: 1910
- Abolished: 1994
- Number of members: 1
- Replaced by: North West

Vanderbijlpark was a constituency in the Transvaal Province of South Africa, which existed from 1910 to 1994. Named for the city of Vanderbijlpark, throughout its existence it elected one member to the House of Assembly.

== Members ==
Election	Parliament	Member	Party	Ref.
1989	21st South African Parliament	Gerrit Viljoen	NP	
