= Pinetown (House of Assembly of South Africa constituency) =

South African constituency, 1910–1994

- Pinetown
- Former constituency for the South African House of Assembly
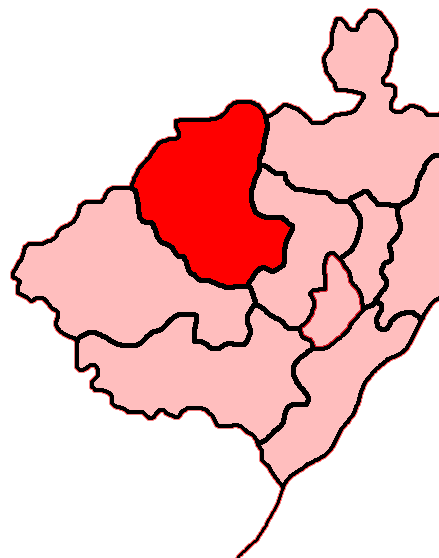
- Location of Pinetown within Durban (1981)
- Province: Natal
- Major settlements: Pinetown

Former constituency
- Created: 1910
- Abolished: 1994
- Number of members: 1
- Replaced by: KwaZulu-Natal

Pinetown was a constituency in the Natal Province of South Africa, which existed from 1910 to 1994. Named for the city of Pinetown, throughout its existence it elected one member to the House of Assembly.

== Members ==
Election	Parliament	Member	Party	Ref.
1989	21st South African Parliament	Roger Marshall Burrows	DP	
