= Parys (House of Assembly of South Africa constituency) =

South African constituency, 1910–1994

- Parys
- Former constituency for the South African House of Assembly
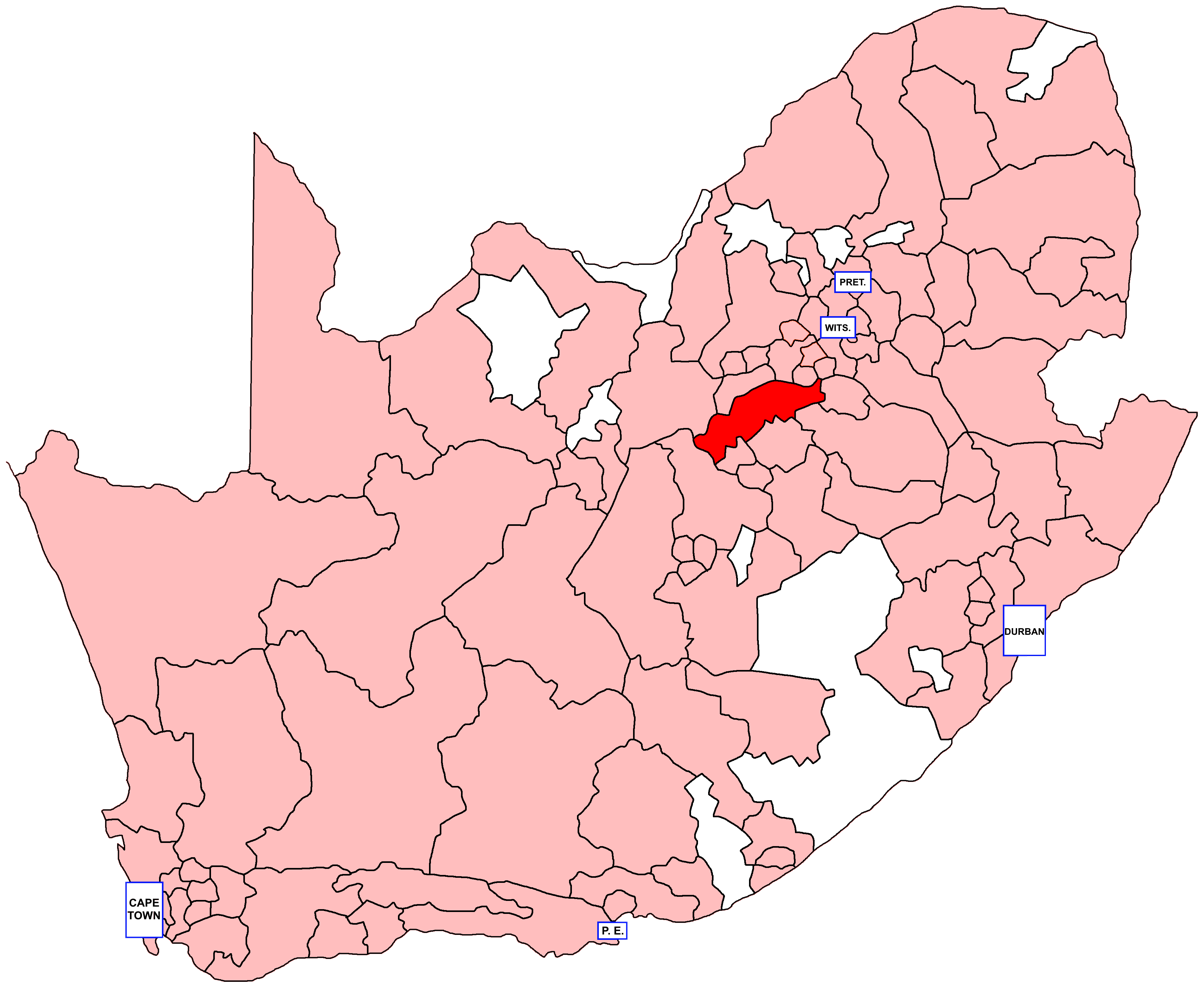
- Location of Parys within South Africa (1981)
- Province: Free State
- Major settlements: Parys

Former constituency
- Created: 1910
- Abolished: 1994
- Number of members: 1
- Replaced by: Free State

Parys was a constituency in the Orange Free State province of South Africa, which existed from 1910 to 1994. Named for the town of Parys, throughout its existence it elected one member to the House of Assembly.

== Members ==
| Election | Parliament | Member | Party | Ref. |
|---|---|---|---|---|
| 1989 | 21st South African Parliament | Pieter Jacobus Gous | CP | |
