= Schweizer-Reneke (House of Assembly of South Africa constituency) =

South African constituency, 1910–1994

- Schweizer-Reneke
- Former constituency for the South African House of Assembly
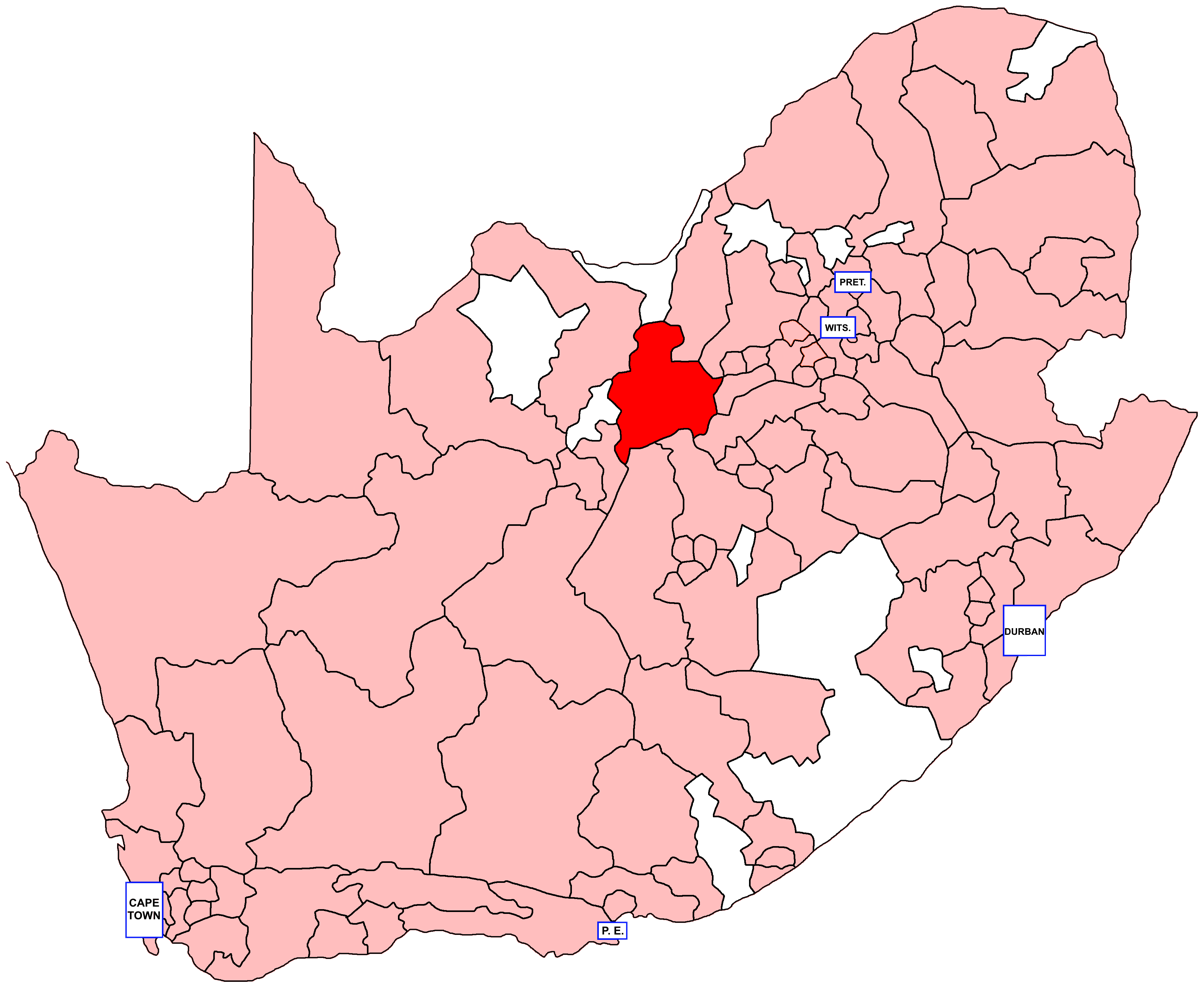
- Location of Schweizer-Reneke within South Africa (1981)
- Province: Transvaal
- Major settlements: Schweizer-Reneke

Former constituency
- Created: 1910
- Abolished: 1994
- Number of members: 1
- Replaced by: North West

Schweizer-Reneke was a constituency in the Transvaal Province of South Africa, which existed from 1910 to 1994. Named for the town of Schweizer-Reneke, throughout its existence it elected one member to the House of Assembly.

== Members ==
Election	Parliament	Member	Party	Ref.
1989	21st South African Parliament	Pieter Mulder	CP	
