= Umhlanga (House of Assembly of South Africa constituency) =

South African constituency, 1910–1994

- Umhlanga
- Former constituency for the South African House of Assembly
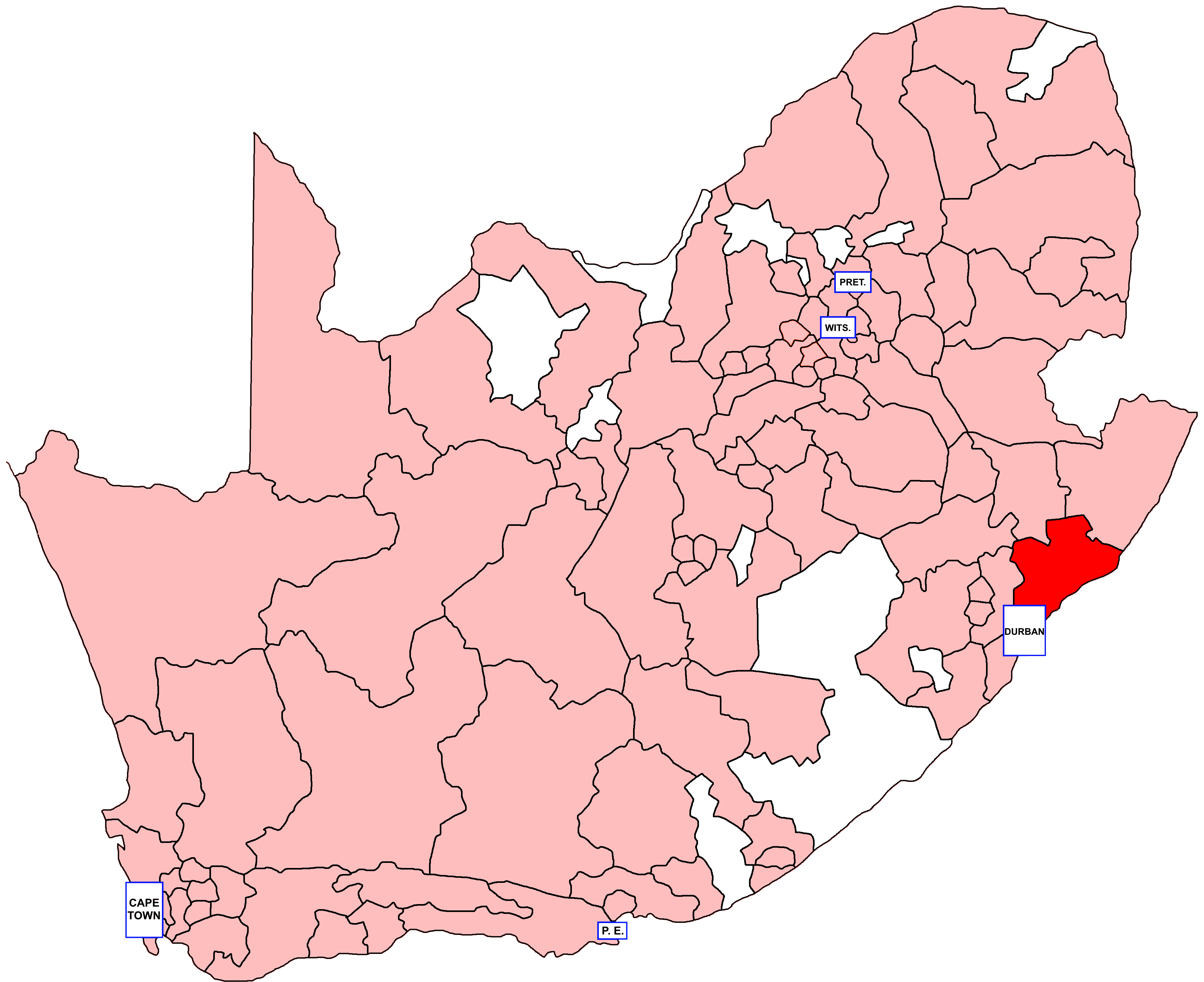
- Location of Umhlanga within South Africa (1981)
- Province: Natal
- Major settlements: uMhlanga

Former constituency
- Created: 1910
- Abolished: 1994
- Number of members: 1
- Replaced by: KwaZulu-Natal

Umhlanga was a constituency in the Natal Province of South Africa, which existed from 1910 to 1994. Named for the town of uMhlanga, throughout its existence it elected one member to the House of Assembly.

== Members ==
Election	Parliament	Member	Party	Ref.
1989	21st South African Parliament	Kobus Jordaan	DP	
