= Klerksdorp (House of Assembly of South Africa constituency) =

- Former constituency for the South African House of Assembly
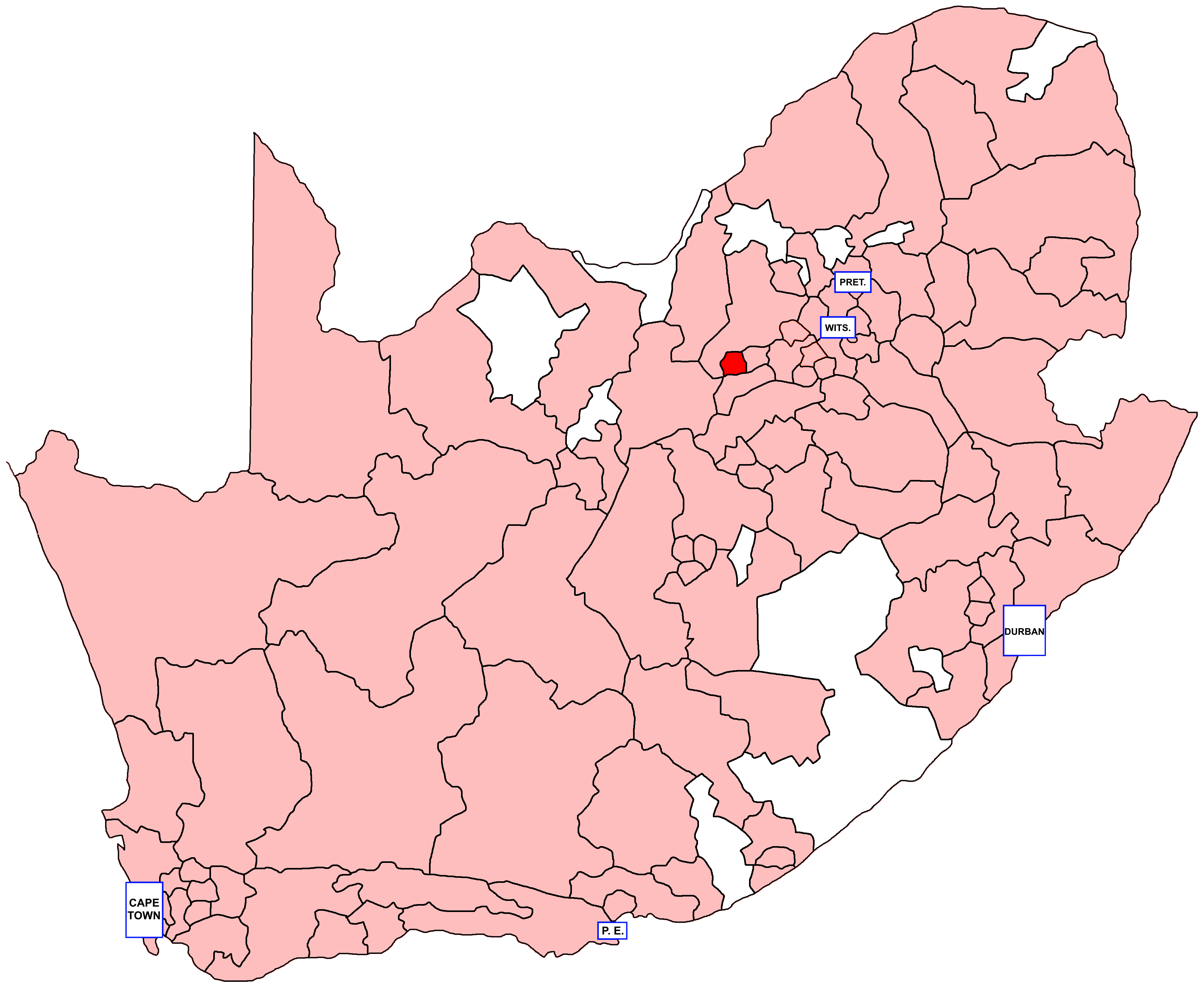
- Location of Klerksdorp within South Africa (1981)
- Province: Transvaal
- Electorate: 29,661 (1989)

Former constituency
- Created: 1915
- Abolished: 1994
- Number of members: 1
- Last MHA: Amie Venter (NP)
- Replaced by: North West

Klerksdorp was a constituency in the Transvaal Province of South Africa, which existed from 1915 to 1994. It covered a part of the western Transvaal centred on the town of Klerksdorp. Throughout its existence it elected one member to the House of Assembly and one to the Transvaal Provincial Council.

== Franchise notes ==
When the Union of South Africa was formed in 1910, the electoral qualifications in use in each pre-existing colony were kept in place. In the Transvaal Colony, and its predecessor the South African Republic, the vote was restricted to white men, and as such, elections in the Transvaal Province were held on a whites-only franchise from the beginning. The franchise was also restricted by property and education qualifications until the 1933 general election, following the passage of the Women's Enfranchisement Act, 1930 and the Franchise Laws Amendment Act, 1931. From then on, the franchise was given to all white citizens aged 21 or over. Non-whites remained disenfranchised until the end of apartheid and the introduction of universal suffrage in 1994.

== History ==
Like most of the rural Transvaal, Klerksdorp had a largely Afrikaans-speaking electorate. For most of its history, it was a safe seat for the National Party, which took it for the first time in 1920 and held it until its abolition with the exception of the 1934-40 period. During these years, the nascent United Party, led by J. B. M. Hertzog and then Jan Smuts, dominated Transvaal politics, and Klerksdorp was no exception. However, when Hertzog left the party in protest at South Africa joining the Second World War, Klerksdorp MP Jan Wilkens followed him back into the Herenigde Nasionale Party. From then until the end of apartheid, Klerksdorp was represented by only three MPs: Wilkens until 1953, then Petrus Cornelius Pelser until 1974, and finally Amie Venter for the last twenty years. Pelser and Venter both served in cabinet, the former under John Vorster and the latter under P. W. Botha and F. W. de Klerk.

== Members ==
Election	Member	Party
1915	J. A. Nesser	South African
1920	J. S. Smit	National
1921	J. S. Smit	National
1924	J. S. Smit	National
1925 by	P. C. de Villiers	National
1929	P. C. de Villiers	National
1933	P. C. de Villiers	National
1934	P. C. de Villiers	United
1937 by	Jan Wilkens	United
1938	Jan Wilkens	United
1940	Jan Wilkens	HNP
1943	Jan Wilkens	HNP
1948	Jan Wilkens	HNP
1953	P. C. Pelser	National
1958	P. C. Pelser	National
1961	P. C. Pelser	National
1966	P. C. Pelser	National
1970	P. C. Pelser	National
1974	Amie Venter	National
1977	Amie Venter	National
1981	Amie Venter	National
1987	Amie Venter	National
1989	Amie Venter	National
1994	Constituency abolished	

== Detailed results ==
=== Elections in the 1910s ===
General election 1915: Klerksdorp
Party	Candidate	Votes	%	±%
South African	J. A. Nesser	1,247	54.1	+5.5
National	J. S. Smit	1,059	45.9	New
Majority		188	8.2	N/A
Turnout		2,306	82.6	N/A
South African win (new seat)				

=== Elections in the 1920s ===
General election 1920: Klerksdorp
Party	Candidate	Votes	%	±%
National	J. S. Smit	1,355	53.9	+8.0
South African	J. A. Nesser	1,160	46.1	−8.0
Majority		195	7.8	N/A
Turnout		2,515	80.5	−2.1
National gain from South African		Swing	+8.0	

General election 1921: Klerksdorp
Party	Candidate	Votes	%	±%
National	J. S. Smit	1,408	53.2	−0.7
South African	J. A. Nesser	1,239	46.8	+0.7
Majority		169	6.4	−1.4
Turnout		2,647	77.7	−2.8
National hold		Swing	-0.7	

General election 1924: Klerksdorp
Party	Candidate	Votes	%	±%
National	J. S. Smit	1,187	56.6	+3.4
South African	J. A. Nesser	907	43.3	−3.5
Rejected ballots		2	0.1	N/A
Majority		280	13.3	+6.9
Turnout		2,096	88.1	+10.4
National hold		Swing	+3.5	

Klerksdorp by-election, 8 April 1925
Party	Candidate	Votes	%	±%
National	P. C. de Villiers	1,289	58.1	+1.5
South African	W. Campbell	917	41.3	−2.0
Rejected ballots		13	0.6	+0.5
Majority		372	16.8	+3.5
Turnout		2,219	86.5	−1.6
National hold		Swing	+1.8	

General election 1929: Klerksdorp
Party	Candidate	Votes	%	±%
National	P. C. de Villiers	1,354	54.4	−2.2
South African	J. A. Nesser	934	45.4	+2.1
Rejected ballots		7	0.2	+0.1
Majority		420	9.0	−4.3
Turnout		2,563	84.4	−3.7
National hold		Swing	-2.2	

=== Elections in the 1930s ===
General election 1933: Klerksdorp
Party	Candidate	Votes	%	±%
National	P. C. de Villiers	Unopposed		
National hold				

Klerksdorp by-election, 20 October 1937
Party	Candidate	Votes	%	±%
Purified National	Jan Wilkens	2,449	54.8	New
United	J. S. Smit	1,977	44.2	New
Rejected ballots		44	1.0	N/A
Majority		472	10.6	N/A
Turnout		4,470	76.1	N/A
Purified National gain from National		Swing	N/A	

General election 1938: Klerksdorp
Party	Candidate	Votes	%	±%
United	Jan Wilkens	3,306	55.9	N/A
Purified National	E. Jooste	2,560	43.3	New
Rejected ballots		50	0.8	N/A
Majority		746	12.6	N/A
Turnout		5,916	87.3	N/A
United hold		Swing	N/A	
