= Meyerton (House of Assembly of South Africa constituency) =

South African constituency, 1910–1994

- Meyerton
- Former constituency for the South African House of Assembly
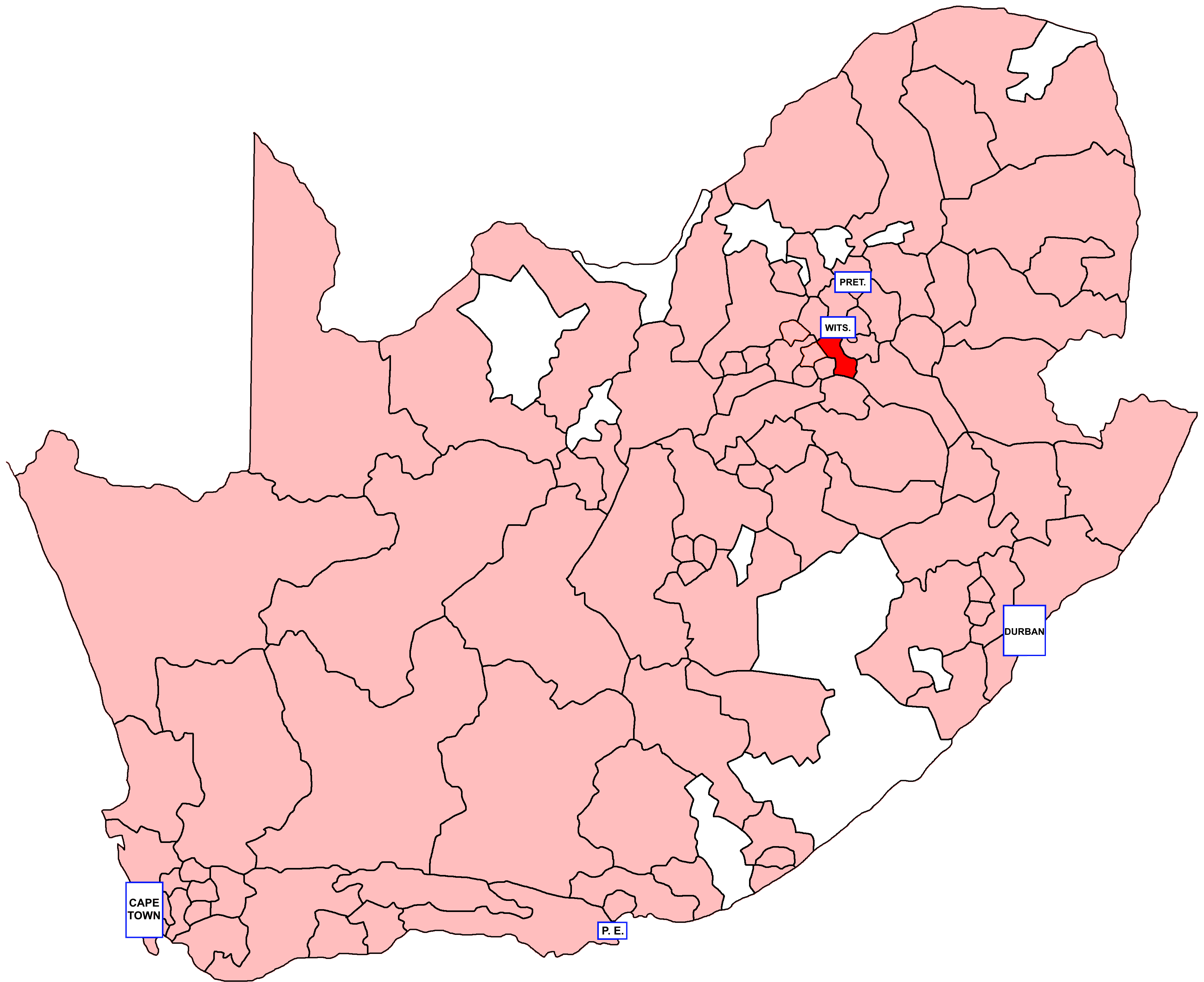
- Location of Meyerton within South Africa (1981)
- Province: Transvaal
- Major settlements: Meyerton

Former constituency
- Created: 1910
- Abolished: 1994
- Number of members: 1
- Replaced by: North West

Meyerton was a constituency in the Transvaal Province of South Africa, which existed from 1910 to 1994. Named for the town of Meyerton, throughout its existence it elected one member to the House of Assembly.

== Members ==
Election	Parliament	Member	Party	Ref.
1989	21st South African Parliament	Willem Lodewickus van der Merwe	CP	
