= 21st South African Parliament =

| ← | 20th | 22nd | → |
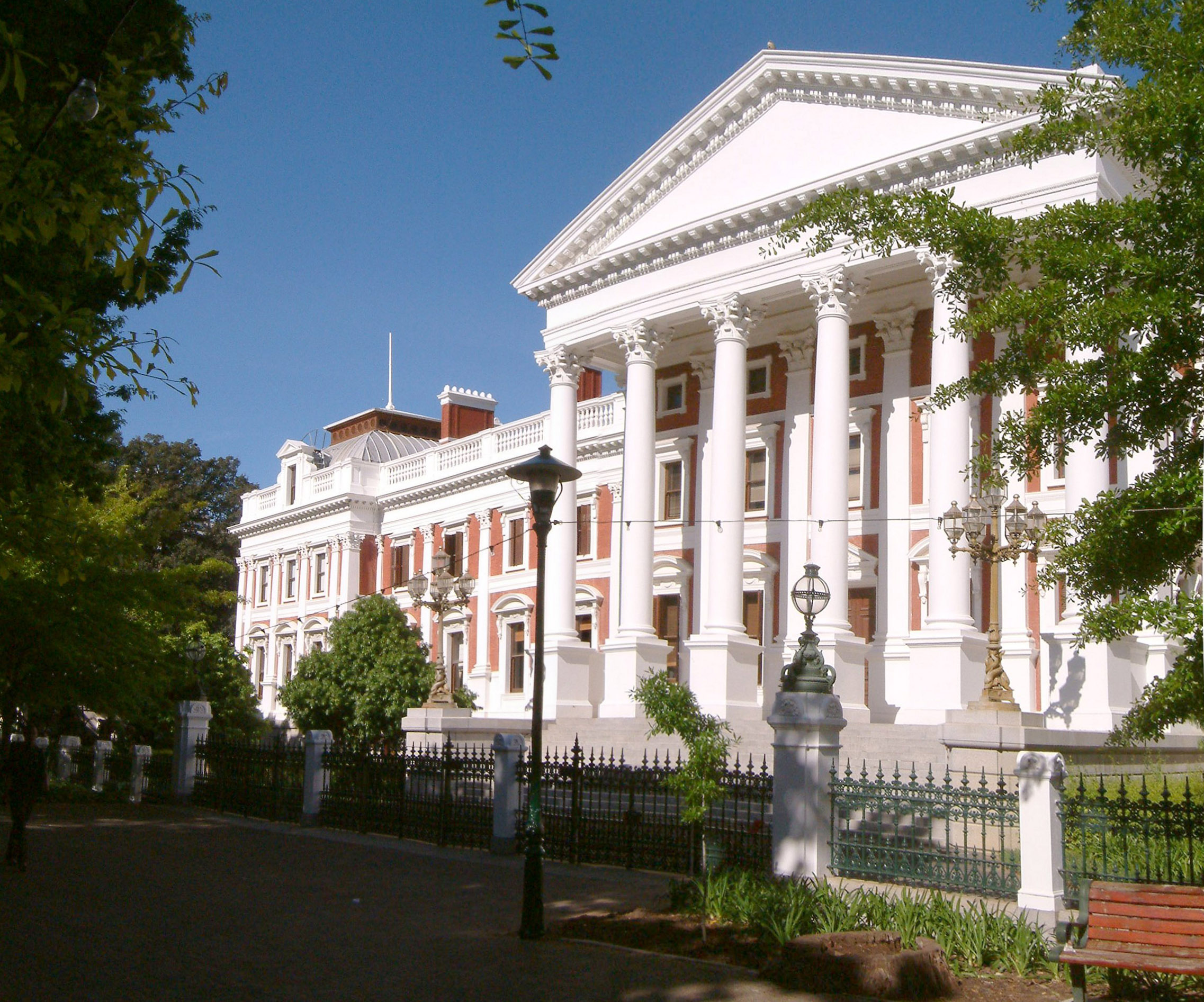
- Houses of Parliament, Cape Town

Overview
- Jurisdiction: South Africa
- Meeting place: Cape Town

House of Assembly of South Africa
- Composition of the House of Assembly
- Members: 178
- Speaker of the House of Assembly of South Africa: Louis le Grange (until 26 October 1991); Gene Louw (final)
- Leader of the Opposition: Andries Treurnicht

House of Representatives of South Africa
- Composition of the House of Representatives
- Members: 85
- Chairman of the Ministers' Council: Allan Hendrickse (until 3 February 1992); Jac Rabie (final)

House of Delegates of South Africa
- Members: 45
- Chairman of the Ministers' Council: J. N. Reddy (until January 1993); Bhadra Ranchod (final)

The 21st South African Parliament was the twenty-first Parliament of South Africa to convene since the unification of South Africa in 1910, the ninth to convene since the adoption of the republican constitution in 1961, and the last before the introduction of universal suffrage in 1994. It was elected in the 1989 South African general election and consisted of three chambers: the House of Assembly, consisting of 166 members elected by the White community, the House of Representatives, consisting of 85 members elected by the Coloured community, and the House of Delegates, consisting of 45 members elected by the Indian community.

Three parties were represented in this parliament: the National Party (NP), the Conservative Party (CP), and the Democratic Party (DP). The National Party retained a diminished majority: it won 94 of the 165 seats, a decrease from the 123 seats it held in the 20th Parliament.

== House of Assembly ==
=== Summary by province ===
The table below gives the number of parliamentary seats, broken down by province. The provinces are those which existed prior to 1994.

| Province | Number of seats |
|---|---|
| Cape | 56 |
| Natal | 20 |
| Orange Free State | 14 |
| Transvaal | 76 |
| Appointed and indirectly elected members | 12 |
| Total | 178 |

=== Parties represented ===
| Party | Seats |
|---|---|
| National Party | 103 |
| Conservative Party | 41 |
| Democratic Party | 34 |

=== Members of the House of Assembly ===
The following is a list of MHAs elected in the 1989 general election to the 21st Parliament, which sat until the 1994 general election.

| Constituency | Province | Name | Party |
|---|---|---|---|
| Albany | Cape | Errol Moorcroft | DP |
| Alberton | Transvaal | Andreas Johannes Gerhardus Oosthuizen | NP |
| Algoa | Cape | Frans Pieter Smit | NP |
| Aliwal | Cape | Jacob Frederik Pretorius | NP |
| Amanzimtoti | Natal | George Shepstone Bartlett | NP |
| Barberton | Transvaal | Casper Uys | CP |
| Beaufort West | Cape | Andries Christof Cloete | NP |
| Bellville | Cape | Cornelius Ackermann | NP |
| Benoni | Transvaal | Josefus Johannes Lemmer | NP |
| Berea | Natal | Denis Worrall | DP |
| Bethal | Transvaal | Christiaan Daniel De Jager | CP |
| Bethlehem | Free State | Paul Johannes Farrell | NP |
| Bezuidenhout | Transvaal | Geoffrey Craig Engel | DP |
| Bloemfontein East | Free State | Johannes Jacobus Swanepoel | NP |
| Bloemfontein North | Free State | Frik van Heerden | NP |
| Bloemfontein West | Free State | Kobie Coetsee | NP |
| Boksburg | Transvaal | Sakkie Blanché | NP |
| Brakpan | Transvaal | François Jacobus Le Roux | CP |
| Brentwood | Transvaal | Boy Geldenhuys | NP |
| Brits | Transvaal | Andrew Gerber | CP |
| Bryanston | Transvaal | Rupert Lorimer | DP |
| Caledon | Cape | Lambert Hendrik Fick | NP |
| Cape Town Gardens | Cape | Ken Andrew | DP |
| Carletonville | Transvaal | Arrie Paulus | CP |
| Ceres | Cape | Willie van Niekerk | NP |
| Claremont | Cape | Jan van Eck | DP |
| Constantia | Cape | Roger Rex Hulley | DP |
| Cradock | Cape | Tobie Meyer | NP |
| De Aar | Cape | Jan Adriaan Jooste | NP |
| De Kuilen | Cape | Myburgh Streicher | NP |
| Delmas | Transvaal | Daniel Gideon Hugo Nolte | CP |
| Durban Central | Natal | Peter Hans Paul Gastrow | DP |
| Durban North | Natal | Mike Ellis | DP |
| Durban Point | Natal | John Clifford Mathee | NP |
| Durbanville | Cape | Frik van Deventer | NP |
| East London City | Cape | Willem Hugh Nel | NP |
| East London North | Cape | Calle Jeugeiauen Wicktor Badenhorst | NP |
| Edenvale | Transvaal | Brian Bradford Goodall | DP |
| Ermelo | Transvaal | Marthinus Johannes Mentz | CP |
| False Bay | Cape | Adriaan Louw Jordaan | NP |
| Fauresmith | Free State | Inus Aucamp | NP |
| Florida | Transvaal | Barend du Plessis | NP |
| Geduld | Transvaal | Sam de Beer | NP |
| George | Cape | Hennie Smit | NP |
| Germiston | Transvaal | Derek Christophers | NP |
| Germiston District | Transvaal | Jacobus Frederik Bosman | NP |
| Gezina | Transvaal | Karel David Swanepoel | NP |
| Gordonia | Cape | Japie Van Wyk | NP |
| Graaff-Reinet | Cape | Johannes Lodewikus Retief | NP |
| Green Point | Cape | Stephanus Sebastian Van der Merwe | DP |
| Greytown | Natal | Pierre Carel Cronjé | DP |
| Groote Schuur | Cape | Dene Smuts | DP |
| Heilbron | Free State | Cehill Hercules Pienaar | CP |
| Helderberg | Cape | François Jacobsz | NP |
| Helderkruin | Transvaal | Christoffel Johannes Van der Merwe | NP |
| Hercules | Transvaal | Salmon Petrus Barnard | CP |
| Hillbrow | Transvaal | Lester Fuchs | DP |
| Houghton | Transvaal | Tony Leon | DP |
| Humansdorp | Cape | Wilhelm Dempers Meyer | NP |
| Innesdal | Transvaal | Rina Venter | NP |
| Jeppe | Transvaal | Hennie Bekker | NP |
| Johannesburg North | Transvaal | Peter George Soal | DP |
| Johannesburg West | Transvaal | Roelf Meyer | NP |
| Kempton Park | Transvaal | Tersia King | NP |
| Kimberley North | Cape | Jan Antonie Brazelle | NP |
| Kimberley South | Cape | Keppies Niemann | NP |
| King William's Town | Cape | Raymond Julius Radue | NP |
| Klerksdorp | Transvaal | Amie Venter | NP |
| Klip River | Natal | Johannes Wessels Maree | NP |
| Koedoespoort | Transvaal | Tjaart Andries Petrus Kruger | NP |
| Kroonstad | Free State | Wynand Breytenbach | NP |
| Krugersdorp | Transvaal | Leon Wessels | NP |
| Kuruman | Cape | Jan Hendrik Hoon | CP |
| Ladybrand | Free State | Petrus Hendrik van Rhijn | CP |
| Langlaagte | Transvaal | Johannes Jacobus Vilonel | NP |
| Lichtenburg | Transvaal | Ferdi Hartzenberg | CP |
| Losberg | Transvaal | Stephanus Christoffel Jacobs | CP |
| Lydenburg | Transvaal | Andries Abraham Bosman Bruwer | CP |
| Maitland | Cape | Kent Durr | NP |
| Malmesbury | Cape | Gert Jeremias Kotzé | NP |
| Maraisburg | Transvaal | Pieter Hamman de la Rey | CP |
| Meyerton | Transvaal | Willem Lodewickus van der Merwe | CP |
| Middelburg | Transvaal | Hendrik Jacobus Coetzee | CP |
| Modderfontein | Transvaal | Magnus Malan | NP |
| Mooi River | Natal | Wessel Uys Nel | DP |
| Mossel Bay | Cape | Helgard Michael Janse van Rensburg | NP |
| Namaqualand | Cape | Eli van der Merwe Louw | NP |
| Nelspruit | Transvaal | Pieter Ludolf Maré | NP |
| Newcastle | Natal | Adriaan Blaas | NP |
| Newton Park | Cape | Izak Louw | NP |
| Nigel | Transvaal | Carel Benjamin Schoeman | CP |
| North Rand | Transvaal | Louis Arnold De Waal | DP |
| Oudtshoorn | Cape | Arnoldus Johannes De Jager | NP |
| Overvaal | Transvaal | Koos van der Merwe | CP |
| Paarl | Cape | Gene Louw | NP |
| Parktown | Transvaal | Zach de Beer | DP |
| Parow | Cape | Hernus Kriel | NP |
| Parys | Free State | Pieter Jacobus Gous | CP |
| Pietermaritzburg North | Natal | Michael Ashton Tarr | DP |
| Pietermaritzburg South | Natal | Robert Frederick Haswell | DP |
| Pietersburg | Transvaal | Willem Jacobus Snyman | CP |
| Piketberg | Cape | Dawie de Villiers | NP |
| Pinelands | Cape | John Jasper Walsh | DP |
| Pinetown | Natal | Roger Marshall Burrows | DP |
| Port Elizabeth Central | Cape | Eddie Trent | DP |
| Port Elizabeth North | Cape | Gert Myburgh | NP |
| Port Natal | Natal | Johan André Marais | NP |
| Potchefstroom | Transvaal | Louis le Grange | NP |
| Potgietersrus | Transvaal | David Schalk Pienaar | CP |
| Pretoria Central | Transvaal | Gert Oosthuizen | NP |
| Pretoria East | Transvaal | Theo Alant | NP |
| Pretoria West | Transvaal | Joseph Chiole | CP |
| Prieska | Cape | Kraai van Niekerk | NP |
| Primrose | Transvaal | Piet Welgemoed | NP |
| Queenstown | Cape | Manie Schoeman | NP |
| Randburg | Transvaal | Wynand Malan | DP |
| Randfontein | Transvaal | Corné Mulder | CP |
| Rissik | Transvaal | Chris Fismer | NP |
| Roodeplaat | Transvaal | Daniel Petrus du Plessis | CP |
| Roodepoort | Transvaal | Jurgens Johannes Stephanus Prinsloo | CP |
| Rosettenville | Transvaal | Sheila Camerer | NP |
| Rustenburg | Transvaal | Willie Botha | CP |
| Sandton | Transvaal | David Dalling | DP |
| Sasolburg | Free State | Louis Frans Stofberg | CP |
| Schweizer-Reneke | Transvaal | Pieter Mulder | CP |
| Sea Point | Cape | Colin Eglin | DP |
| Simonstown | Cape | Jannie Momberg | DP |
| Smithfield | Free State | Abraham Pieter Oosthuizen | CP |
| South Coast | Natal | Aubrey Gordon Thompson | NP |
| Soutpansberg | Transvaal | Tom Langley | CP |
| Springs | Transvaal | Pieter Willem Coetzer | NP |
| Standerton | Transvaal | Jacobus Rosier de Ville | CP |
| Stellenbosch | Cape | Piet Marais | NP |
| Stilfontein | Transvaal | Pieter Groenewald | CP |
| Sundays River | Cape | Tertius Delport | NP |
| Sunnyside | Transvaal | Fanus Schoeman | NP |
| Swellendam | Cape | Nic Koornhof | NP |
| Turffontein | Transvaal | André Fourie | NP |
| Tygervallei | Cape | Sakkie Pretorius | NP |
| Uitenhage | Cape | Willem Abraham Botha | CP |
| Umbilo | Natal | Carole Heeley Charlewood | DP |
| Umfolozi | Natal | James Schnetler | NP |
| Umhlanga | Natal | Kobus Jordaan | DP |
| Umhlatuzana | Natal | Johan Steenkamp | NP |
| Umlazi | Natal | Cornelius Botha | NP |
| Vanderbijlpark | Transvaal | Gerrit Viljoen | NP |
| Vasco | Cape | Johann Hendrik Heyns | NP |
| Ventersdorp | Transvaal | Stefanus Petrus van Vuuren | CP |
| Vereeniging | Transvaal | Thomas Gunning | NP |
| Verwoerdburg | Transvaal | Adriaan Vlok | NP |
| Virginia | Free State | Petrus Johannes Clase | NP |
| Vryburg | Cape | Johannes Hendrikus Lodewyk Scheepers | NP |
| Vryheid | Natal | Jurie Mentz | NP |
| Walmer | Cape | Bob Rogers | DP |
| Walvis Bay | Cape | Christoffel Lombard De Jager | NP |
| Waterberg | Transvaal | Andries Treurnicht | CP |
| Waterkloof | Transvaal | George Marais | NP |
| Welkom | Free State | Ernst Jacobus Jordaan | CP |
| Wellington | Cape | Guillaume Johannes Malherb | NP |
| Westdene | Transvaal | Pik Botha | NP |
| Winburg | Free State | Pieter Theodorus Steyn | NP |
| Witbank | Transvaal | Wynand Jacobus Davel van Wyk | CP |
| Wonderboom | Transvaal | Jacobus Johannes Christoffel Botha | CP |
| Worcester | Cape | Ryno King | NP |
| Wynberg | Cape | Robin Carlisle | DP |
| Yeoville | Transvaal | Harry Schwarz | DP |

== House of Representatives ==
=== Summary by province ===
The table below gives the number of parliamentary seats, broken down by province. The provinces are those which existed prior to 1994.

| Province | Number of seats |
|---|---|
| Cape | 60 |
| Natal | 5 |
| Orange Free State | 5 |
| Transvaal | 10 |
| Appointed and indirectly elected members | 5 |
| Total | 85 |

=== Parties represented ===
| Party | Seats |
|---|---|
| Labour Party | 74 |
| Democratic Reform Party | 5 |
| United Democratic Party | 3 |
| Freedom Party | 1 |
| Independents | 2 |

=== Members of the House of Representatives ===
The following is a list of MHRs elected in the 1989 general election to the 21st Parliament, which sat until the 1994 general election.

| Constituency | Province | Name | Party |
|---|---|---|---|
| Addo | Cape | Hendrickse, Peter | LP |
| Alra Park | Transvaal | Roper, Arthur James | LP |
| Belhar | Cape | Simmons, Stan | LP |
| Berg River | Cape | Gordon, Errol Richard | LP |
| Bethelsdorp | Cape | Dietrich, William John | LP |
| Bishop Lavis | Cape | Isaacs, Nicholas Martin | DRP |
| Bokkeveld | Cape | Nasson, Clifford Ivor | LP |
| Bonteheuwel | Cape | McKenzie, Patrick | LP |
| Border | Cape | Mopp, Peter Alexander Stewart | LP |
| Bosmont | Transvaal | George, Trevor Richard | LP |
| Britstown | Cape | Hollander, Louis Jacob | LP |
| Daljosaphat | Cape | Leander, Christian Johannes George | LP |
| Diamant | Cape | Abrahams, Leslie Charles | LP |
| Diaz | Cape | Sampson, Lester James | LP |
| Durban Suburbs | Natal | Landers, Luwellyn | LP |
| Dysseldorp | Cape | Swigelaar, James Daniel | LP |
| Eastern Free State | Free State | Sanders, Philip | LP |
| Eersterus | Transvaal | da Gama, Patrick Richard Eric | LP |
| Eldorado Park | Transvaal | Mateman, Donald Harry | LP |
| Elsies River | Cape | Kleinsmidt, Paul | LP |
| Essellen Park | Cape | Ismail, Anwar | LP |
| Fish River | Cape | Koeberg, Carolus | LP |
| Gelvandale | Cape | Loonat, Mahomed | LP |
| Genadendal | Cape | Padiachy, Neville Johannes | LP |
| Grassy Park | Cape | Ebrahim, Sulaiman | DRP |
| Greenwood Park | Natal | George, Cyril Maurice | Ind |
| Griqualand West | Cape | Essop, Ismail | LP |
| Haarlem | Cape | Green, Charlie Elias | LP |
| Hanover Park | Cape | Lategan, Kenneth Henry | LP |
| Hantam | Cape | Krieger, John David | LP |
| Hawston | Cape | Carelse, Glen Morris Edwin | LP |
| Heidedal | Free State | Grobbler, Benjamin | LP |
| Heideveld | Cape | Johannes, Andries Frederick | DRP |
| Kalahari | Cape | Julies, Andrew Alfred | LP |
| Karee | Cape | Masher, Mario | LP |
| Kasselsvlei | Cape | Cupido, Hendry | LP |
| Klipspruit West | Transvaal | Reeves, Anthony | LP |
| Liesbeek | Cape | Klink, Pieter Johannes Lukas | LP |
| Macassar | Cape | Herandien, Cecil | DRP |
| Mamre | Cape | Williams, Abe | LP |
| Manenberg | Cape | Kuiler, James Ronald | LP |
| Matroosfontein | Cape | Thomas, Gordon Henry John | DRP |
| Middle Karoo | Cape | Saaiman, Pieter | DRP |
| Mitchells Plain | Cape | Fisher, Stanley David | LP |
| Natal Interior | Natal | Whyte, William Lawrence | LP |
| Natal Mid-East | Natal | Napier, Peter Thomas Charles | LP |
| Newclare | Transvaal | Wessels, Gregory Raymond | LP |
| North Eastern Cape | Cape | O'Reilly, Reginald | LP |
| Northern Cape | Cape | Lockey, Desmond | LP |
| Northern Transvaal | Transvaal | Verveen, Solomon Hardy | LP |
| Nuweveld | Cape | Essop, Anver | LP |
| Opkoms | Free State | Macalagh, Godfrey Job | LP |
| Ottery | Cape | de la Cruz, Dennis | DRP |
| Outiniqua | Cape | April, Christiaan Jeffrey | LP |
| Pniel | Cape | Curry, David Michael George | LP |
| Ravensmead | Cape | Curry, David Michael George | Ind |
| Rawsonville | Cape | Andrews, Barend Johannes | LP |
| Reiger Park | Transvaal | Rabie, Jac | DRP |
| Retreat | Cape | Morkel, Gerald | LP |
| Rietvlei | Cape | Ross, Harold Phillip | LP |
| Riversdale | Cape | Josephs, Douglas Willem Nebuchadnezzar | LP |
| Robertson | Cape | Meyer, William James | LP |
| Rust ter Vaal | Transvaal | Louw, Sam | LP |
| Schauderville | Cape | Hendrickse, Michael André | LP |
| Silvertown | Cape | Rhoda, Rodney | LP |
| Springbok | Cape | Friedberg, Moritz | LP |
| Steinkopf | Cape | Balie, Abraham | LP |
| Strandfontein | Cape | Harris, Peter Christopher | LP |
| Southern Cape | Cape | Cupido, Basil Peter | LP |
| Southern Free State | Free State | Leeuw, Godfrey Louis Gerrit | LP |
| Suurbraak | Cape | Harmse, Peter Samuel | LP |
| Swartkops | Cape | Hendrickse, Allan | LP |
| Swartland | Cape | Oosthuizen, Jacobus Christian | LP |
| Swartland | Cape | Hoosen, Soheir | FP |
| Toekomsrus | Transvaal | Richards, Ishmail | LP |
| Upington | Cape | Theron, Moza Mayman | LP |
| Vredendal | Cape | Meyer, Petrus | LP |
| Wentworth | Natal | Abrahams, Thomas | LP |
| Western Free State | Free State | Rooskrans, Glen | LP |
| Wuppertal | Cape | Wyngaard, Christiaan Allen | LP |

== House of Delegates ==
=== Summary by province ===
The table below gives the number of parliamentary seats, broken down by province. The provinces are those which existed prior to 1994.

| Province | Number of seats |
|---|---|
| Cape | 3 |
| Natal | 29 |
| Orange Free State | 0 |
| Transvaal | 8 |
| Appointed and indirectly elected members | 5 |
| Total | 45 |

=== Parties represented ===
| Party | Seats |
|---|---|
| Solidarity | 19 |
| National People's Party | 9 |
| Merit People's Party | 4 |
| Democratic Party | 3 |
| Freedom Party | 2 |
| National Federal Party | 1 |
| People's Party of South Africa | 1 |
| Independents | 6 |

=== Members of the House of Delegates ===
The following is a list of MHDs elected in the 1989 general election to the 21st Parliament, which sat until the 1994 general election.

| Constituency | Province | Name | Party |
|---|---|---|---|
| Actonville | Transvaal | Abram, Salamuddi | PPSA |
| Allandale | Natal | Nadasen, Perumal Chinappyan | FP |
| Arena Park | Natal | Rajbansi, Amichand | NPP |
| Bayview | Natal | Palan, Thulkanna | Sol |
| Brickfield | Natal | Joosab, Ebrahim | NPP |
| Camperdown | Natal | Gounden, Thirumalingam Linga | Sol |
| Cavendish | Natal | Devan, Palanisamy Iyanna | Sol |
| Central Rand | Transvaal | Padiachey, Desmond | NFP |
| Chatsworth Central | Natal | Chetty, Kasawal | Sol |
| Clare Estate | Natal | Mohanlall, Madanlall | NPP |
| Durban Bay | Natal | Naidoo, Arulsivanathan Ganas Varadappa | NPP |
| Eastern Transvaal | Transvaal | Khan, Abdus Sammed | Sol |
| Glenview | Natal | Reddy, Jagaram Narainsamy | Sol |
| Havenside | Natal | Bandulalla, Mohanlal | Sol |
| Isipingo | Natal | Govender, Pubal | Ind |
| Laudium | Transvaal | Akoob, Abdool Sattar | Sol |
| Lenasia Central | Transvaal | Ebrahim, Rashida | MPP |
| Lenasia East | Transvaal | Daya, Ranchod | MPP |
| Lenasia West | Transvaal | Sakalingum, Darmalingum | MPP |
| Malabar | Cape | Bhana, Rawanlal | Sol |
| Mariannhill | Natal | Naranjee, Manilall | Ind |
| Merebank | Natal | Rajoo, Kisten | Ind |
| Montford | Natal | Mahabeer, Rishinand Ramnath | Ind |
| Moorcross | Natal | Baig, Mahomed Yakoob | NPP |
| Natal Midlands | Natal | Pachai, Somaroo Pachai | Sol |
| Newholme | Natal | Neerahoo, Hemanthikumar Murilal | Ind |
| North Coast | Natal | Jumuna, Narantuk Jamuna | Sol |
| Northern Natal | Natal | Naicker, Soobramoney Vythilingam | NPP |
| North Western Cape | Cape | Padayachy, Murguasen Sammy | FP |
| North Western Transvaal | Transvaal | Makda, Yakoob Mahomed | Sol |
| Phoenix | Natal | Singh, Aumsensingh | DP |
| Red Hill | Natal | Dookie, Baldeo | Sol |
| Reservoir Hills | Natal | Panday, Chatoo | NPP |
| Rylands | Cape | Mohamed, Abdul Ganie | Ind |
| Springfield | Natal | Rajab, Mahmoud | DP |
| Southern Natal | Natal | Moodley, Kisten | Sol |
| Stanger | Natal | Rajab, Mahmoud | Sol |
| Tongaat | Natal | Abraham, Michael | DP |
| Umzinto | Natal | Singh, Narend | Sol |
| Verulam | Natal | Naidoo, Sagadava | NPP |
