= Desmond Lockey =

South African politician and businessman (born 1961)

Member of the National Assembly
- In office May 1994 – April 2004
- Constituency: North West

Member of the House of Representatives
- In office 1984–1994

Personal details
- Born: 15 December 1961 (age 64)
- Citizenship: South Africa
- Party: African National Congress
- Other political affiliations: Labour Party
- Relations: Allan Hendrickse (father-in-law)

Desmond Lockey (born 15 December 1961) is a South African businessman and former politician. He represented the Labour Party in the apartheid-era House of Representatives from 1984 to 1994 and then represented the African National Congress (ANC) in the National Assembly from 1994 to 2004. He retired from active politics in 2004 in order to pursue his business career and founded Arch Equity, a billion-rand investment company known for its involvement in black economic empowerment deals.

== Legislative career ==
=== House of Assembly: 1984–1994 ===
Born on 15 December 1961, Lockey joined the Tricameral Parliament in the 1984 general election at age 22. He served in the House of Representatives, the newly established chamber for Coloureds. Because he was the son-in-law of Labour Party leader Allan Hendrickse, his nomination to Parliament – which coincided with the nomination of Hendrickse's other son, Peter – was criticised as a possible incident of nepotism. He served continuously in his seat until the House of Representatives was abolished upon the end of apartheid.

=== National Assembly: 1994–2004 ===
In South Africa's first post-apartheid elections in 1994, Lockey was elected to represent the ANC in the new National Assembly. He served two terms, gaining re-election in 1999, and represented the North West constituency. He chaired the Portfolio Committee on Home Affairs during the first democratic Parliament. In early 2004, Lockey announced his intention to retire from politics and become a full-time businessman after the April 2004 general election.

== Career in business ==
In early February 2004, the Stellenbosch-based PSG Group, the owner of life-insurance firm Channel Life, announced a R120-million BEE transaction that would install Lockey as controlling shareholder and non-executive director at Channel Life. Later the same month, Lockey announced that his investment interests, including the newly acquired interest in Channel Life, would be consolidated in his company, Arch Equity, where he was controlling shareholder and chief executive; at the same time, Arch Equity acquired 3.7 per cent of PSG Group in a further BEE transaction. PSG said that Lockey, still a sitting MP, would serve on its board and that the transaction was a first step to enabling Arch Equity to hold at least 10 per cent of the company.

By October 2004, Arch Equity owned 17 per cent of PSG Group, 14 per cent of Capitec Bank, and 75 per cent of comPress Publications Management, among other interests. Lockey said that the company's acquisitions would continue as it raised its stake in PSG Group, Capitec, and Unitrans, and that it intended to list on the JSE Securities Exchange before the end of the year. By 2006, Arch Equity was a R1.2-billion public company with 600 shareholders.

In August 2006, a court approved a proposed takeover of Arch Equity by PSG Group and, the following day, Lockey unexpectedly resigned as Arch Equity chief executive and as PSG director. He sold his stake in what remained of Arch Equity, saying, "I did not feel like leaving as the chief executive of a listed company and run a company that's worth maybe R100 million. I can use my experience and my time a lot better".

As of 2016, Lockey was chairperson of Hlumisa, another BEE group.
