= Arena Park (House of Delegates of South Africa constituency) =

Constituency in the Natal Province of South Africa, 1984–1994

- Former constituency for the House of Delegates
- Province: Natal

Former constituency
- Created: 1984
- Abolished: 1994
- Number of members: 1
- Member: Amichand Rajbansi (NPP)
- Replaced by: KwaZulu-Natal

Arena Park was a constituency in the House of Delegates the Indian-designated chamber of South Africas Tricameral Parliament. It existed from 1984 until the chamber's abolition in 1994. The constituency was located in the Chatsworth area of Durban, Natal Province (now KwaZulu-Natal), and represented Indian voters residing there.

== Franchise notes ==
The Tricameral Parliament was established under the Republic of South Africa Constitution Act, 1983. It created three racially segregated chambers: the House of Assembly (for whites), the House of Representatives (for Coloureds), and the House of Delegates (for Indians). The House of Delegates had 45 members, 40 elected from single-member constituencies and 5 appointed by the president. Only Indian South Africans could register and vote in House of Delegates elections. The chamber's powers were limited to "own affairs" (education, health, housing, social welfare, and local government for Indians). "General affairs" (defence, finance, and foreign policy) were handled jointly but remained dominated by the House of Assembly.

Voting was not compulsory, and the franchise was based on adult Indian South African citizens who met basic registration criteria. Widespread opposition to the tricameral system, viewed by many as an attempt to co-opt Coloured and Indian communities while excluding the black majority, led to major boycott campaigns.

== History ==
Arena Park was one of the new constituencies created for the first House of Delegates elections held on 28 August 1984. It covered parts of the Indian township of Chatsworth, a major residential area for Indians established under the Group Areas Act. The seat was named after the Arena Park suburb.

The constituency was a stronghold for the National People's Party led by Amichand Rajbansi. Rajbansi won the seat in both the 1984 and 1989 elections. He used his base in Arena Park to build influence within the Indian chamber and later became Chairman of the Ministers Council for Indian Own Affairs.

Elections were characterised by extremely low turnout due to boycotts organised by the Natal Indian Congress, United Democratic Front, and other anti-apartheid groups. Despite this, Rajbansi maintained strong support among those who did vote.

== Members ==
Election	Member	Party
1984	Amichand Rajbansi	National People's Party
1989	Amichand Rajbansi	National People's Party

== Abolition ==
Arena Park and the entire House of Delegates were abolished with the transition to non-racial democracy in 1994. The tricameral system ended, and the area became part of the new KwaZulu-Natal Legislature and the national National Assembly under a proportional representation system. Amichand Rajbansi continued his political career after 1994 as leader of the Minority Front.
