= Rodney Rhoda =

South African politician (born 1940)

Member of the National Assembly
- In office May 1994 – April 2004
- Constituency: Western Cape

Personal details
- Born: Rodney Tyrone Rhoda; 5 October 1940 (age 85)
- Citizenship: South Africa
- Party: Congress of the People (since 2008)
- Other political affiliations: New National Party; National Party; Labour Party

Rodney Tyrone Rhoda (born 5 October 1940) is a retired South African politician from the Western Cape. Formerly a Labour Party representative in the apartheid-era House of Representatives, he represented the National Party (NP) and New National Party (NNP) in the National Assembly from 1994 to 2004. In 2005, he was convicted of defrauding Parliament in the Travelgate scandal.

== Early life and career ==
Rhoda was born on 5 October 1940. He was a pharmacist by profession and developed and marketed his own range of hair and skincare products. During apartheid, he was a member of the Labour Party and an MP in the House of Representatives, the Coloured house of the Tricameral Parliament; his constituency was Liesbeek in Cape Town.

== Post-apartheid career ==
In South Africa's first post-apartheid elections in 1994, Rhoda was elected to represent the NP in the National Assembly. He was elected to a second term in 1999 under the banner of the newly renamed NNP. He was a member of the Western Cape caucus of the assembly, and during his second term he was also chairperson of the NNP's Cape Town branch.

Although Rhoda left Parliament after the 2004 general election, he was named in August 2004 as one of a large number of MPs and former MPs who were under investigation by the Scorpions for involvement in Travelgate. He appeared in court in February 2005. In April 2005, he accepted a plea deal in terms of which he pleaded guilty to fraud, admitting that he had used about R43,000 in parliamentary air-travel vouchers to pay for hotel accommodation. He was sentenced to pay a fine of R30,000 or serve one year in prison, in addition to a mandatory three-year prison sentence suspended for three years.

In 2008, Rhoda announced that he had joined the Congress of the People.
