= Kisten Rajoo =

South African politician (born 1940)

Member of the National Assembly
- In office 9 May 1994 – 1 August 2000

Personal details
- Born: 4 February 1940 (age 86)
- Citizenship: South Africa
- Party: Inkatha Freedom Party
- Other political affiliations: National Party; Solidarity

Kisten Rajoo (born 4 February 1940) is a South African politician and businessman. He represented the Inkatha Freedom Party (IFP) in the National Assembly from 1994 to 2000, and before that he served in the apartheid-era House of Delegates.

== House of Delegates ==
During apartheid, Rajoo served in the House of Delegates, the Indian house of the Tricameral Parliament. He served variously as an independent, a member of Solidarity, and, for a period of weeks, a member of the National Party. He also served a term as the Minister of Indian Education and Culture.

== National Assembly ==
Rajoo served two terms in an IFP seat in the National Assembly, gaining election in 1994 and 1999. He vacated his seat on 1 August 2000 and was replaced by Maxwell Sibiya.

Somewhat controversially, he retained business interests in the casino sector even while serving as a member of Parliament's Ad Hoc Committee on Gambling and Lotteries Legislation. He gave up his seat in the committee when required to do so by new legislation in 1996. He later served in the Portfolio Committee on Minerals and Energy.
