= JN Reddy (politician) =

South African politician (1925–2019)

Jayaram Narainsamy Reddy (24 October 1925 – 5 July 2019) popularly known as JN Reddy, was a South African politician who was the leader of the Solidarity party which was represented in the House of Delegates, the body within the Apartheid Tricameral Parliament reserved for Indian South Africans.^{p.60} He was the leader of the opposition from 1984 to 1989, and the leader of the majority party in the House from 1989 to 1993.

== Personal life ==
JN Reddy was one of seven children of Narainsamy and Kanigama Reddy. His father was born in Puthoor, a village in the South Arcot District of the Madras Presidency of India, now in the Tiruvannamalai district. JN Reddy's father had ethnic-Telugu ancestry, as he belonged to the Reddy caste. JN Reddy's father came to South Africa at the age of 5, where his father was working for the South African Railways after serving out a term of Indentured servitude in a sugar plantation. Narainsamy Reddy was active in the workers' rights movement and a member of the Natal Indian Congress, a party started by Mahatma Gandhi. He admired Gandhi, running errands for him during his stay in Durban. He also took part in the efforts to maintain the Tamil language and culture in South Africa.

JN Reddy attended primary school at the Seaview state-aided Indian school and secondary school at Sastri College. He started work as a customs clerk, later becoming a Freight Forwarding and customs clearance consultant.

Later in life, Reddy lived in an affluent white neighbourhood. Although it was forbidden under the Group Areas Act, wealthy Indians were tolerated in white areas in Durban.

== Business career ==
In 1965, Reddy started the company Sealandair Shipping and Forwarding, the first such company in South Africa not owned by whites. In 1970 with support from the state, he started the New Republic Bank, which he described as the first black bank in South Africa, at a time when the major South African banks only employed white tellers. He remained the chairman of the bank for seven years. He was also active as an insurance broker at the time. He served on the councils of the University of Durban-Westville and ML Sultan Technikon, and was able to influence large industrial companies to take on apprentices and technicians from these institutions, increasing Indian economic participation. He also used his influence to convince the authorities to accept people of colour for training as Chartered accountants and telecommunications technicians. He served on the boards of a number of companies, including the Rembrandt Group, the Permanent Building Society and Standard Bank, and also served on the Prime Minister's Economic Advisory Council.

== Political career ==
Reddy was an active supporter of the rights of Indians under Apartheid, lobbying to get parts of Cato Manor declared an Indian area under the Group Areas Act and for Indians to be allowed to work north of the Tugela River, for example in Richards Bay. He was present for the adoption of the Freedom Charter in Kliptown in 1955, due to his involvement with the Natal Indian Congress. He was the chairman of the executive committee of the South African Indian Council from 1973 to 1980.

In 1984, in the lead-up to the 1984 South African general election, which determined the makeup of the first House of Delegates, Reddy co-founded the political party Solidarity, becoming its first leader. The party was named after the Polish trade union.^{p.40} To be able to lead the party, Reddy relinquished some of his business interests. Another important party member was Pat Poovalingam, the chairman of weekly newspaper "The Graphic". Solidarity appealed more to South Africans with Southern Indian roots, while Amichand Rajbansi's National People's Party appealed more to those with a North Indian heritage.

The election of 1984 was marked by boycotts, as many Coloured and Indian South Africans saw the tricameral system as a means to entrench Apartheid. This resistance was led by the United Democratic Front. Despite having been formed less than a year before the election, Solidarity contested all 40 constituencies in the House of Delegates. The party campaigned on a platform of repealing discriminatory legislation in the economic field^{p.59} and "peaceful change towards a just and democratic society with safeguards for minorities".

There were suggestions at the time that Solidarity was somehow initiated by the government, as Prime Minister P. W. Botha preferred Dr. Reddy to the leadership of the National People's Party,^{p.59} a claim which was made more credible by the fact that some of the party leaders, including Reddy, had been members of government institutions, for example the President's Council. Another reason was that Solidarity was able to afford to spend more than its opponents on propaganda, although Solidarity claimed that this was all funded by personal contributions.

Despite winning most of the seats in the Natal province in the 1984 election, Solidarity was not able to win enough seats in the other provinces, and formed the opposition to the National People's Party.^{p.59} The two parties had very similar political positions, so that plans were made for a merger. These plans were thwarted by a court action brought by Poovalingam. Instead, the parties agreed on a coalition, with two Solidarity members (JN Reddy and Ismail Kathrada) appointed to the Minister's Council. Five party members, including Poovalingam, refused to accept the coalition, and were suspended from the party. The coalition only lasted a few months, however, and dissolved, partly due to differences between the parties, but also because the Speaker of the House ruled that Solidarity could not be the official opposition while its leader served on the Council.^{p.60}

In 1988, Rajbansi was removed from his position as chairman of the Minister's Council due to corruption, based on the preliminary findings of the James Commission of inquiry, and Reddy assumed this position in March 1989. In the 1989 South African general election in September, Solidarity was able to win 19 of the 45 seats (40 elected and 5 appointed). This result established it as the governing party in the House, motivating independents and members of smaller parties to join Solidarity and giving it a majority position. In 1991, Rajbansi briefly regained a majority in the House after a successful vote of no confidence in Reddy, but this was soon overturned, allowing Reddy to retain leadership of the House. In 1991, it was expected that conservative parties such as Solidarity would align themselves with the National Party, but Reddy denied rumours that the Solidarity leadership was discussing plans to join the National Party. Reddy resigned from the House of Delegates in 1993.

Although Solidarity did not take part in the first non-racial election in 1994, Reddy and D.S. Rajah, another Solidarity member, were listed as candidates by the African National Congress. The Natal Indian Congress, however, protested their inclusion on the grounds that it would be hypocritical to support candidates who had taken part in the Tricameral system that the liberation movements had protested against, hence they were dropped from the list.
