= Paul Kleinsmidt =

South African politician

Personal details
- Born: Paul Johannes Kleinsmidt; 1 July 1936 (age 89)
- Citizenship: South Africa
- Party: National Party; New National Party
- Other political affiliations: Labour Party

Paul Johannes Kleinsmidt (born 1 July 1936) is a retired South African politician who represented the National Party in the National Assembly during the first democratic Parliament. He was not initially elected in the 1994 general election but was sworn in during the term to fill a casual vacancy. He stood for re-election in 1999 as a candidate in the Western Cape constituency, but he was ranked in unelectable position on the party list.

During apartheid, Kleinsmidt represented the Elsies River constituency in the House of Representatives, the Coloured house of the Tricameral Parliament. He was a member of the Labour Party before he joined the National Party.
