= Bloemfontein (disambiguation) =

Bloemfontein is a city, one of three national capitals of South Africa.

Bloemfontein may also refer to:

- the Anglican Diocese of the Free State, formerly the Diocese of Bloemfontein
- the Roman Catholic Archdiocese of Bloemfontein
- Bloemfontein High School, in the city
- HMSAS Bloemfontein, a Canadian Second World War minesweeper named Rosamund, purchased by the South African Navy in 1947 and renamed
- Bloemfontein East (House of Assembly of South Africa constituency)
- Bloemfontein North (House of Assembly of South Africa constituency)
- Bloemfontein South (House of Assembly of South Africa constituency)
- Bloemfontein West (House of Assembly of South Africa constituency)
