= Abe Williams =

South African politician (born 1940)

Member of the National Assembly
- In office 9 May 1994 – 14 August 2000
- Constituency: Western Cape

Minister of Welfare and Population Development
- In office May 1994 – February 1996
- President: Nelson Mandela
- Preceded by: Jac Rabie
- Succeeded by: Patrick McKenzie

Minister of Sport
- In office February 1993 – April 1994
- President: F. W. de Klerk
- Succeeded by: Steve Tshwete

Personal details
- Born: Abraham Williams; 12 December 1940 (age 85)
- Citizenship: South Africa
- Party: New National Party; National Party

Abraham Williams (born 12 December 1940) is a retired South African politician from the Western Cape. He was the last apartheid-era Minister of Sport from 1993 to 1994 and then was the first post-apartheid Minister of Welfare and Population Development from 1994 to 1996.

Latterly a member of the National Party (NP) and New National Party (NNP), Williams served in the National Assembly until August 2000, when he was convicted of fraud and incarcerated. He served one year of a three-year prison sentence before receiving parole in September 2001.

== Early life and career ==
Born on 12 December 1940, Williams was formerly a prominent rugby administrator. Designated as Coloured under apartheid, he served in the House of Representatives, the all-Coloured house of the Tricameral Parliament, where he was a member of the Ministers' Council.

In February 1993, President F. W. de Klerk announced that he had appointed Williams to his cabinet in a reshuffle, naming him as Minister of Sport. He and two others appointed at the same time – Jac Rabie and Bhadra Ranchod – became the first non-white politicians to serve in the South African cabinet, in a move viewed as an attempt by de Klerk's party, the NP, to broaden its appeal ahead of the upcoming multiracial elections. In May 1993, Williams told the Washington Post, "I think Coloureds have great respect for [Nelson] Mandela, but we fear the ANC".

== Post-apartheid political career ==
=== Minister of Welfare: 1994–1996 ===
In the 1994 general election, Williams was elected to represent the NP in the new multi-racial National Assembly. In addition, newly elected President Nelson Mandela appointed Williams to his multi-party Government of National Unity as Minister of Welfare and Population Development. The Mail & Guardian was highly critical of Williams's performance in that portfolio: for two consecutive years in 1994 and 1995, the newspaper awarded Williams's work a score of two out of ten, quipping that Williams had "shown a keen interest in welfare – his own".

=== Backbencher: 1996–2000 ===
In February 1996, less than two years into the legislative term, Williams's homes and offices in Cape Town and Pretoria were raided by law enforcement officers, who said that they were at an early stage of a fraud investigation. Later the same day, Williams tendered his resignation from the cabinet, though he emphasised that his resignation was not an admission of guilt.

He remained an ordinary Member of Parliament and was re-elected to a second term in his seat in the 1999 general election, serving the Western Cape constituency. However, the law enforcement investigation continued, and after Williams's criminal conviction, he left his parliamentary seat on 14 August 2000, ceding his seat to Johnny Schippers.

== Fraud conviction ==
In June 1999, shortly after the second democratic elections, Williams was charged with several counts of fraud and corruption. The charges pertained to his time as a member of the Ministers' Council in the House of Representatives: he was accused of having accepted kickbacks from two companies which did business with the state. He was also charged with theft, in connection with political donations that he had accepted for his community work on the Cape West Coast but had allegedly used for private purposes instead. The NNP said that he would retain his parliamentary seat until the trial was concluded, though he resigned as deputy chairman of the NNP caucus in Parliament.

In June 2000, the Cape High Court convicted Williams on 36 counts of theft (in connection with an amount of R268,142 in donations) and four counts of fraud (in connection with an amount of R240,112). He was handed a suspended sentence for the theft convictions but was sentenced to three years in prison on the fraud charges. His appeals were unsuccessful, and his prison sentence began in early September 2000.

Williams served just over a year in Pollsmoor Prison before he was paroled in September 2001. Upon his release, he would not comment on his professional plans, saying, "I've always been a community man and I will try to serve my community irrespective of whether or not I am in politics". He gave a partial account of his actions:

If I must say sorry, then I apologise to communities I might have hurt, and the world. I made mistakes and I paid the price. I have no regrets about going to prison... It was not my intention to pocket the money. Although most of the money I used was spent on political-party work, the law found me guilty of fraud. I accept that.
