= J. N. Reddy =

J. N. Reddy may refer to:

- J. N. Reddy (engineer), Indian-American engineer
- JN Reddy (politician), South African politician
