= H. M. Neerahoo =

South African politician (born 1956)

Member of the National Assembly
- In office May 1994 – June 1999

Personal details
- Born: Hemanthkumar Murilal Neerahoo; 31 December 1956 (age 69)
- Citizenship: South Africa
- Party: Inkatha Freedom Party

Hemanthkumar Murilal Neerahoo (born 31 December 1956) is a South African politician who represented the Inkatha Freedom Party (IFP) in the National Assembly during the first democratic Parliament from 1994 to 1999. He was elected to his seat in the 1994 general election. Though he stood for re-election in the 1999 general election, he was ranked 21st on the IFP's national party list and failed to win a seat.

During apartheid, Neerahoo served in the House of Delegates, the house of the Tricameral Parliament designated for Indians. He represented the Newholme constituency in Pietermaritzburg.
