= Jac Rabie =

South African politician (1938–2008)

Member of the National Assembly
- In office May 1994 – June 1999

Minister for Population Development
- In office February 1993 – April 1994
- President: F. W. de Klerk
- Succeeded by: Abe Williams

Member of the House of Representatives

Assembly Member for Reiger Park
- In office August 1984 – April 1994

Personal details
- Born: Jacobus Albert Rabie; August 1938 Middelburg, Transvaal; Union of South Africa
- Died: 29 April 2008 (aged 79) Boksburg, Gauteng; South Africa
- Party: National Party (since 1991)
- Other political affiliations: Labour Party; United Democratic Party; Federal Coloured People's Party

Jacobus Albert Rabie (August 1938 – 29 April 2008) was a South African politician who was Minister for Population Development under President F. W. de Klerk from 1993 to 1994. He served in the apartheid-era House of Representatives throughout its lifespan from 1984 to 1994, representing the Reiger Park constituency, and subsequently served one term in the post-apartheid National Assembly from 1994 to 1999.

Rabie entered politics as Reiger Park's representative on the Coloured Representative Council, where he was a member throughout the council's existence from 1969 to 1980. He joined the council as a member of the Federal Coloured People's Party but, after being expelled from the party, he sat as an independent before joining the Labour Party in 1978. He became the Labour Party's chairman in the Transvaal in 1982 and was elected to the House of Representatives under its banner when the Tricameral Parliament was established in 1984. During his first term in the house, he split from the Labour Party to establish the United Democratic Party. He joined the governing National Party (NP) in 1991 and represented it in the National Assembly after the end of apartheid in 1994.

== Early life and career ==
Rabie was born in Middelburg in the former Transvaal in August 1938. His father was Indian and his mother was a Coloured domestic worker. The government evicted the family from their farm when Rabie was a child and they moved to Pretoria, where Rabie matriculated in 1958 at Pretoria Indian Boys' School. He trained as a teacher in Coronationville and took up his first teaching post in Potchefstroom in 1966. He left teaching after two years due to disputes with the teaching authorities, and by then he was active in the Federal Coloured People's Party (FCPP), having become an organiser for the party in the Transvaal in 1967.

In 1969, the party nominated him to sit on the Coloured Representative Council as the representative of the Reiger Park constituency in Boksburg, Transvaal. After launching an unsuccessful bid to become leader of the FCPP in 1975, Rabie fell out with the new party leadership, among other things over his support for political proposals which would see independent Coloured homelands established in each of South Africa's provinces. He was expelled from the party and sat in the CRC as an independent for three-and-a-half years, becoming the unofficial leader of the independents' caucus in the council. He joined the Labour Party in 1978 and continued to serve on the CRC until it was disbanded in 1980.

== Parliament ==
=== Tricameral Parliament: 1984–1994 ===
In 1982, Rabie elected as the chairman of the Labour Party's Transvaal regional branch, and he continued in that position after losing a campaign to be elected the party's national chairman in January 1984. In the 1984 general election, Rabie was elected to represent the Reiger Park constituency in the House of Representatives, the all-Coloured house of the new Tricameral Parliament. During the legislative term that followed, Rabie split from the Labour Party in protest of its accommodating stance towards the government, though reportedly also due to "personality clashes" with the Labour Party's leadership. He subsequently formed the breakaway United Democratic Party (UDP), which in the 1989 general election won three seats in the House of Representatives, among them Rabie's seat in Reiger Park. As leader of the UDP, Rabie advocated for the abolition of the Group Areas Act and of the racially segregated Tricameral Parliament.

In May 1991, Rabie disbanded the UDP, and he and his colleagues joined the governing National Party (NP). In February 1993, during an advanced stage of South Africa's democratic transition, he was appointed to the cabinet of President F. W. de Klerk, who named him as Minister for Population Development.

=== National Assembly: 1994–1999 ===
After South Africa's first post-apartheid elections in 1994, Rabie served a term in the post-apartheid Parliament, representing the NP in the new multi-racial National Assembly.

== Personal life and death ==
In 1962, Rabie married Angeline Rabie (née Roos), with whom he had four sons and one daughter. He later remarried to Sandra Rabie. On 14 December 2006, Sandra, then aged 47, was killed during a robbery at their home in Windmill Park on the East Rand; both Rabie and the couple's adopted son were present. She died of a broken neck at the scene. Three men, including one teenager whom the Rabies knew personally, were charged with the robbery and murder.

Rabie himself died on 29 April 2008 at Sunward Park Hospital in Boksburg. He had been hospitalised with cerebral atrophy, which his family said was aggravated by the trauma of his wife's murder.
