= New Labour Party (South Africa) =

Political party in South Africa

The New Labour Party (NLP) was a minor South African political party founded by Peter Marais through floor crossing legislation after he left the New National Party under some disrepute. The name was chosen to evoke the former Labour Party led by the Reverend Allan Hendrickse, as an anti-apartheid Coloured party. The NLP sought to position itself as the political voice of Coloured people, particularly in the Western Cape Province, but it was unsuccessful. The party won only 0.09% of the vote in the 2004 nationwide election and 0.67% in the simultaneous election to the Western Cape legislature.

It did not contest the 2009 election, but supporting the formation of a new party, the Christian Democratic Alliance (CDA), along with several other parties. The CDA failed to win a seat.
