= Mario Masher =

South African politician

Member of the National Assembly
- In office May 1994 – June 1999

Personal details
- Born: 1948/1949 George, Cape Province; Union of South Africa
- Died: 26 November 2020 (aged 71)
- Party: African National Congress (after 1999); New National Party (1997–99); National Party (1994–97); Labour Party (before 1994)

Mario George Masher (died 26 November 2020) was a South African politician from the Western Cape. He represented the National Party (NP) in the National Assembly from 1994 to 1999, when he defected to the African National Congress (ANC). A teacher by profession, he formerly represented the Labour Party in the Tricameral Parliament. After joining the ANC, he was appointed South African Consul-General to Hong Kong and Macau.

== Early life and career ==
Masher was born in 1948 or 1949 in George in the former Cape Province; he was the eldest of several siblings. He was a teacher by profession and from 1980 to 1986 he served as an independent local councillor in the now-defunct Pacaltsdorp Municipality.

== Legislative career: 1988–1999 ==
Masher served in the Coloured chamber of the apartheid-era Tricameral Parliament from 1988, representing the Labour Party. In South Africa's first post-apartheid elections in 1994, Masher was elected to represent the NP in the National Assembly, the lower house of the new South African Parliament. He served as a party whip for the NP (later restyled as the New National Party).

In April 1999, ahead of the 1999 general election, Masher announced that he was resigning from the NP to join the ruling ANC. He said that he was leaving the NP because the party and the Western Cape provincial government were being hijacked by right-wingers and P. W. Botha acolytes.

== Later career ==
Masher was not re-elected to Parliament in 1999 but instead became a director in the Department of Foreign Affairs from 2000 to 2003. He was subsequently appointed as South African Consul-General to Hong Kong and Macau.

In 2016, he joined the Plaaslike Besorgde Inwoners (PBI; Concerned Local Residents), a minor political party based in George, and became its candidate for election as a councillor in George Local Municipality in the 2016 local elections. Although PBI won the seat, another candidate was sworn into the council. Masher died on 26 November 2020 of a heart attack, aged 71.
