= Anthony Reeves =

South African politician

Personal details
- Born: Anthony Edgar Reeves; 1 November 1951
- Died: 7 August 2021 (aged 69)
- Citizenship: South Africa
- Party: National Party; New National Party
- Other political affiliations: Labour Party

Anthony Edgar Reeves (1 November 1951 – 7 August 2021) was a South African politician and sports administrator from Gauteng. He served in the House of Representatives and National Assembly, representing the Labour Party and National Party, and was a former president of the South African Football Association (SAFA) in Johannesburg.

== Political career ==
Born on 1 November 1951, Reeves was a member of the House of Representatives, the Coloured house of the National Assembly, during apartheid. He joined as a member of the Labour Party and represented the constituency of Klipspruit West outside Johannesburg.

After the end of apartheid in 1994, Reeves represented the National Party in the National Assembly during the first democratic Parliament. He was not initially elected in the 1994 general election but was sworn in during the term to fill a casual vacancy. In 1999, he stood for election to the Gauteng Provincial Legislature, but he was ranked 20th on his party's party list and did not win a seat.

== Soccer administration ==
After leaving legislative politics, Reeves was president of SAFA's Johannesburg region. He was serving as a member of SAFA's Competitions Committee on 7 August 2021, when he died of a heart attack.
