= Democratic Reform Party =

Democratic Reform Party may refer to:

- Democratic Reform Party (Japan, 1989)
- Democratic Reform Party (Japan, 2026)
- Partido para sa Demokratikong Reporma, Philippines
- Democratic Reform Party (South Africa)
- Democratic Reforms Party, Azerbaijan
- Reformist Democratic Party, Bolivia

== See also ==
- Democratic Party Reform Organization, a split from the US Democratic Party in the 1984 New York state election
