= Ismail Richards =

South African politician

Member of the National Assembly
- In office 1994–1999

Member of the House of Representatives
- In office 1984–1994

Personal details
- Citizenship: South Africa
- Party: African National Congress
- Other political affiliations: Labour Party

Ismail Richards is a South African politician who represented the African National Congress in the National Assembly during the first democratic Parliament from 1994 to 1999. He was elected in the 1994 general election and was a member of the Portfolio Committee on Home Affairs and Portfolio Committee on Environmental Affairs and Tourism. He did not stand for re-election in 1999.

During apartheid, Richards served in the all-Coloured House of Representatives from 1984 to 1994. He represented the Labour Party.
