= Umhlatuzana =

Umhlatuzana may refer to:

- Umhlatuzana (House of Assembly of South Africa constituency)
- Umhlatuzana Rock Shelter
- Umhlatuzana Viaduct
