= Roodeplaat =

Roodeplaat may refer to:

- Roodeplaat Dam
- Roodeplaat Nature Reserve
- Roodeplaat Research Laboratories
- Roodeplaat (House of Assembly of South Africa constituency)
