= Michael Abraham =

Michael Abraham may refer to:

- Michael Abraham (Home and Away), fictional character
- Michael Abraham (chemist) (1930s–2021), English chemist
- Michael Abraham (rabbi) (born 1960), Israeli rabbi
- Michael Abraham (politician) (1952–2022), South African politician and lawyer

== See also ==
- Michael Abraham Levy (born 1944), British businessman
- Michael Abraham Shadid (1882–1966), Lebanese doctor
