= False Bay (House of Assembly of South Africa constituency) =

- Valsbaai
- Former constituency for the South African House of Assembly
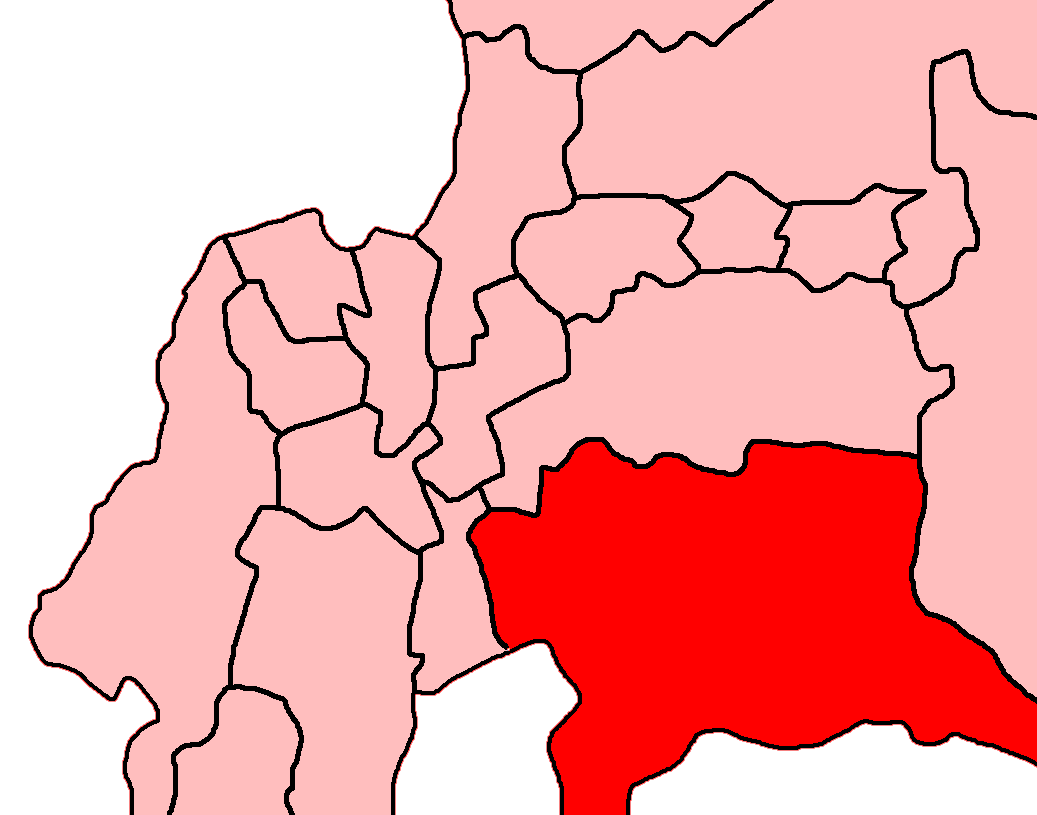
- Location of False Bay within Cape Town (1981)
- Province: Cape of Good Hope
- Electorate: 17,379 (1989)

Former constituency
- Created: 1953
- Abolished: 1994
- Number of members: 1
- Last MHA: A. L. Jordaan (NP)
- Created from: Caledon
- Replaced by: Western Cape

False Bay (Afrikaans: Valsbaai) was a constituency in the Cape Province of South Africa, which existed from 1953 to 1994. Centred on the town of Strand, it covered an area to the southeast of Cape Town, along the shore of the namesake bay. Throughout its existence it elected one member to the House of Assembly and one to the Cape Provincial Council.

== Franchise notes ==
When the Union of South Africa was formed in 1910, the electoral qualifications in use in each pre-existing colony were kept in place. The Cape Colony had implemented a "colour-blind" franchise known as the Cape Qualified Franchise, which included all adult literate men owning more than £75 worth of property (controversially raised from £25 in 1892), and this initially remained in effect after the colony became the Cape Province. As of 1908, 22,784 out of 152,221 electors in the Cape Colony were "Native or Coloured". Eligibility to serve in Parliament and the provincial council, however, was restricted to whites from 1910 onward.

The first challenge to the Cape Qualified Franchise came with the Women's Enfranchisement Act, 1930 and the Franchise Laws Amendment Act, 1931, which extended the vote to women and removed property qualifications for the white population only – non-white voters remained subject to the earlier restrictions. In 1936, the Representation of Natives Act removed all black voters from the common electoral roll and introduced three "Native Representative Members", white MPs elected by the black voters of the province and meant to represent their interests in particular. A similar provision was made for Coloured voters with the Separate Representation of Voters Act, 1951, and although this law was challenged by the courts, it went into effect in time for the 1958 general election, which was thus held with all-white voter rolls for the first time in South African history. The all-white franchise would continue until the end of apartheid and the introduction of universal suffrage in 1994.

== History ==
False Bay was created in 1953 out of the west of the former Caledon seat. Like much of the rural Western Cape, it was a safe seat for the governing National Party, which held it throughout its existence. Its most prominent MP, future cabinet minister and acting State President Chris Heunis, represented the seat for one term before moving to the neighbouring seat of Helderberg in 1974.

== Members ==
Election	Member	Party
1953	C. V. de Villiers	National
1958	Dirk Uys	National
1961	Dirk Uys	National
1966	Dirk Uys	National
1970	Chris Heunis	National
1974	Jacobus Albertyn	National
1977	Jacobus Albertyn	National
1981	Jacobus Albertyn	National
1987	A. L. Jordaan	National
1989	A. L. Jordaan	National
1994	constituency abolished	
