= Wellington (House of Assembly of South Africa constituency) =

South African constituency, 1910–1994

- Wellington
- Former constituency for the South African House of Assembly
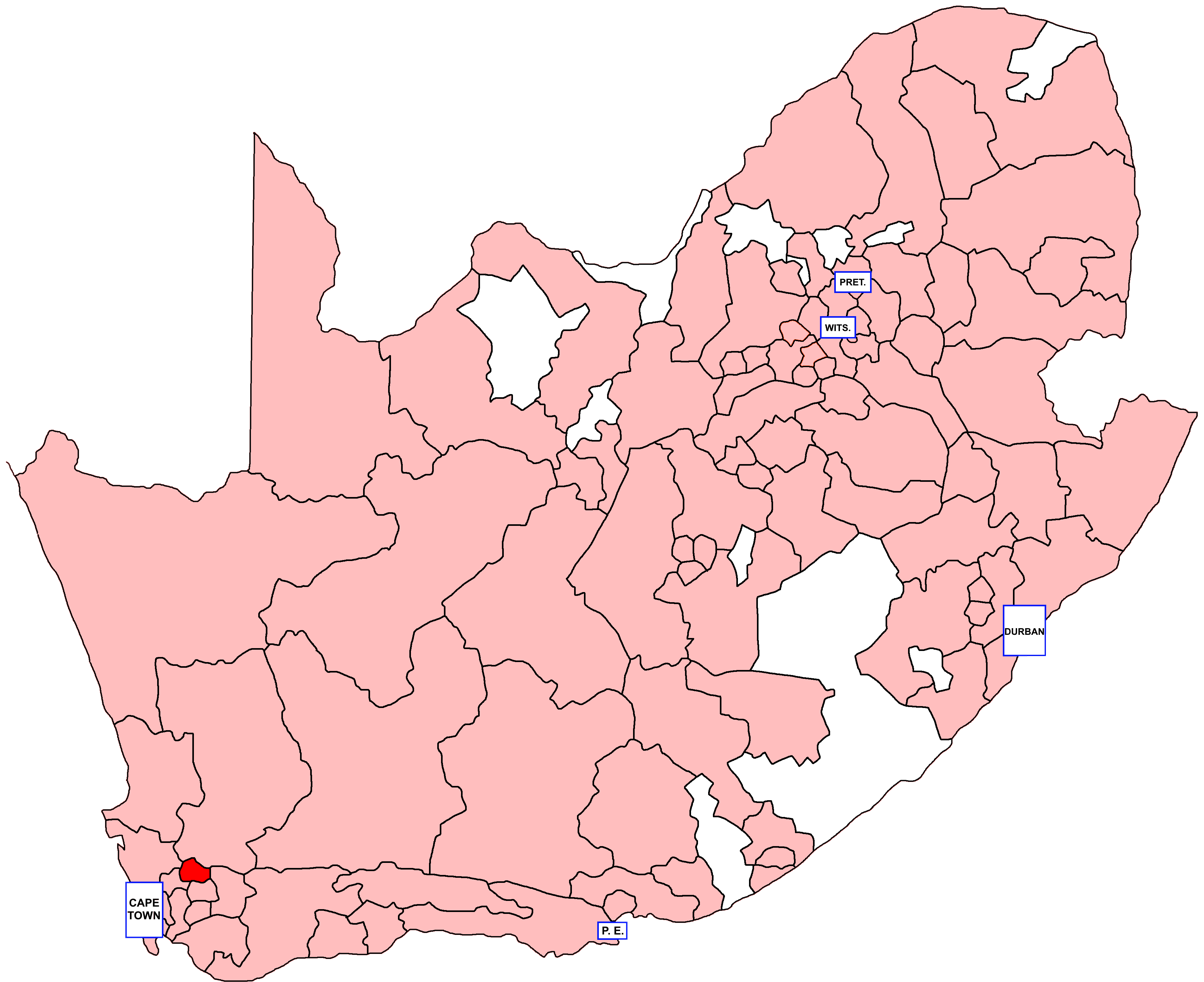
- Location of Wellington within South Africa (1981)
- District: Cape Winelands
- Province: Western Cape
- Major settlements: Wellington

Former constituency
- Created: 1910
- Abolished: 1994
- Number of members: 1
- Replaced by: Western Cape

Wellington was a constituency in the Western Cape of South Africa, which existed from 1910 to 1994. Named for the town of Wellington, throughout its existence it elected one member to the House of Assembly.

== Members ==
Election	Parliament	Member	Party	Ref.
1989	21st South African Parliament	Guillaume Johannes Malherb	NP	
