= Helderberg (House of Assembly of South Africa constituency) =

South African constituency, 1910–1994

- Helderberg
- Former constituency for the South African House of Assembly
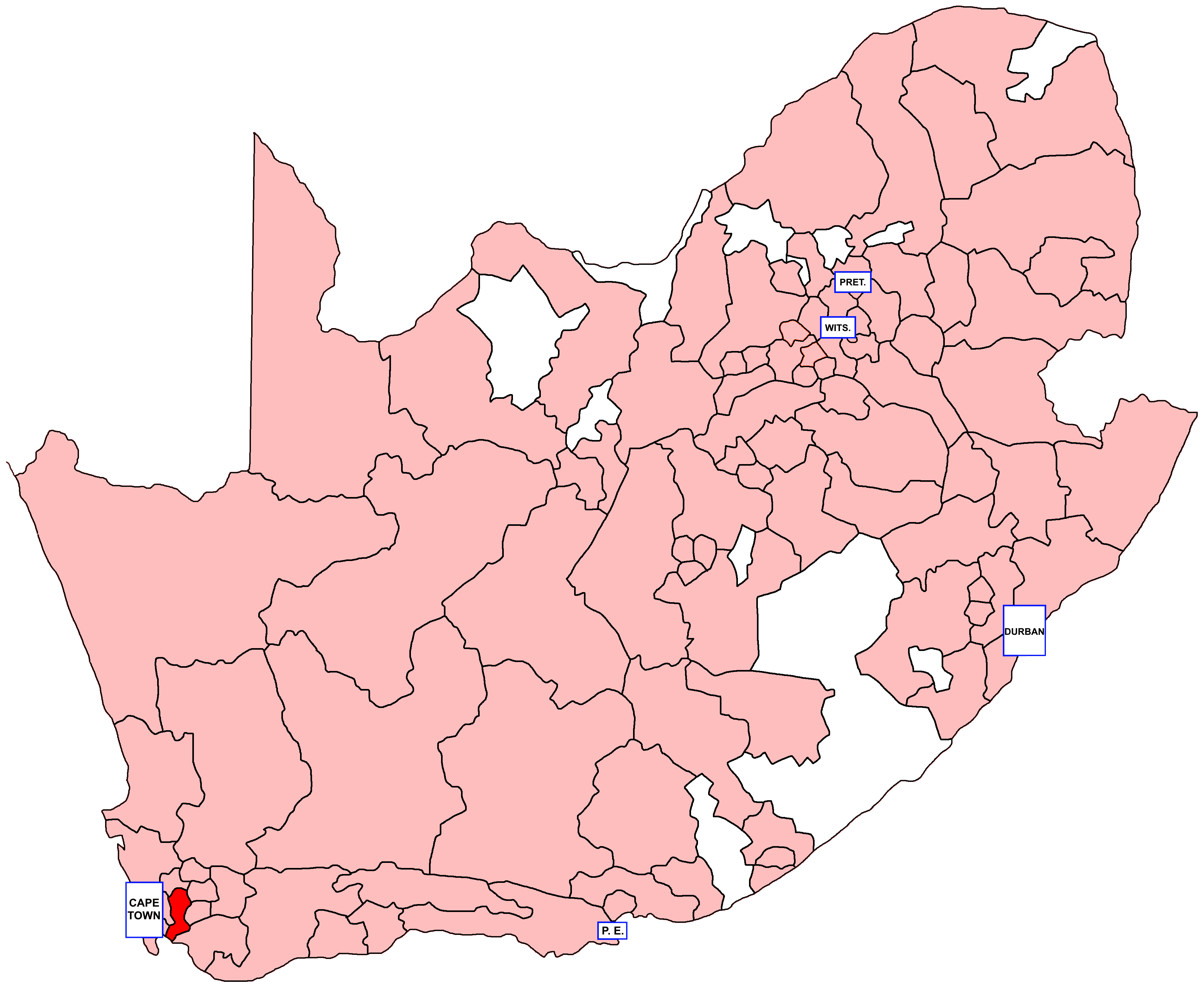
- Location of Helderberg within Helderberg (1981)
- District: Helderberg
- Province: Western Cape

Former constituency
- Created: 1910
- Abolished: 1994
- Number of members: 1
- Replaced by: Western Cape

Helderberg was a constituency in the Western Cape of South Africa, which existed from 1910 to 1994. Named for the Helderberg area of Cape Town, throughout its existence it elected one member to the House of Assembly.

== Members ==
Election	Parliament	Member	Party	Ref.
1989	21st South African Parliament	François Jacobsz	NP	
