= Umfolozi (House of Assembly of South Africa constituency) =

South African constituency, 1910–1994

- Umfolozi
- Former constituency for the South African House of Assembly
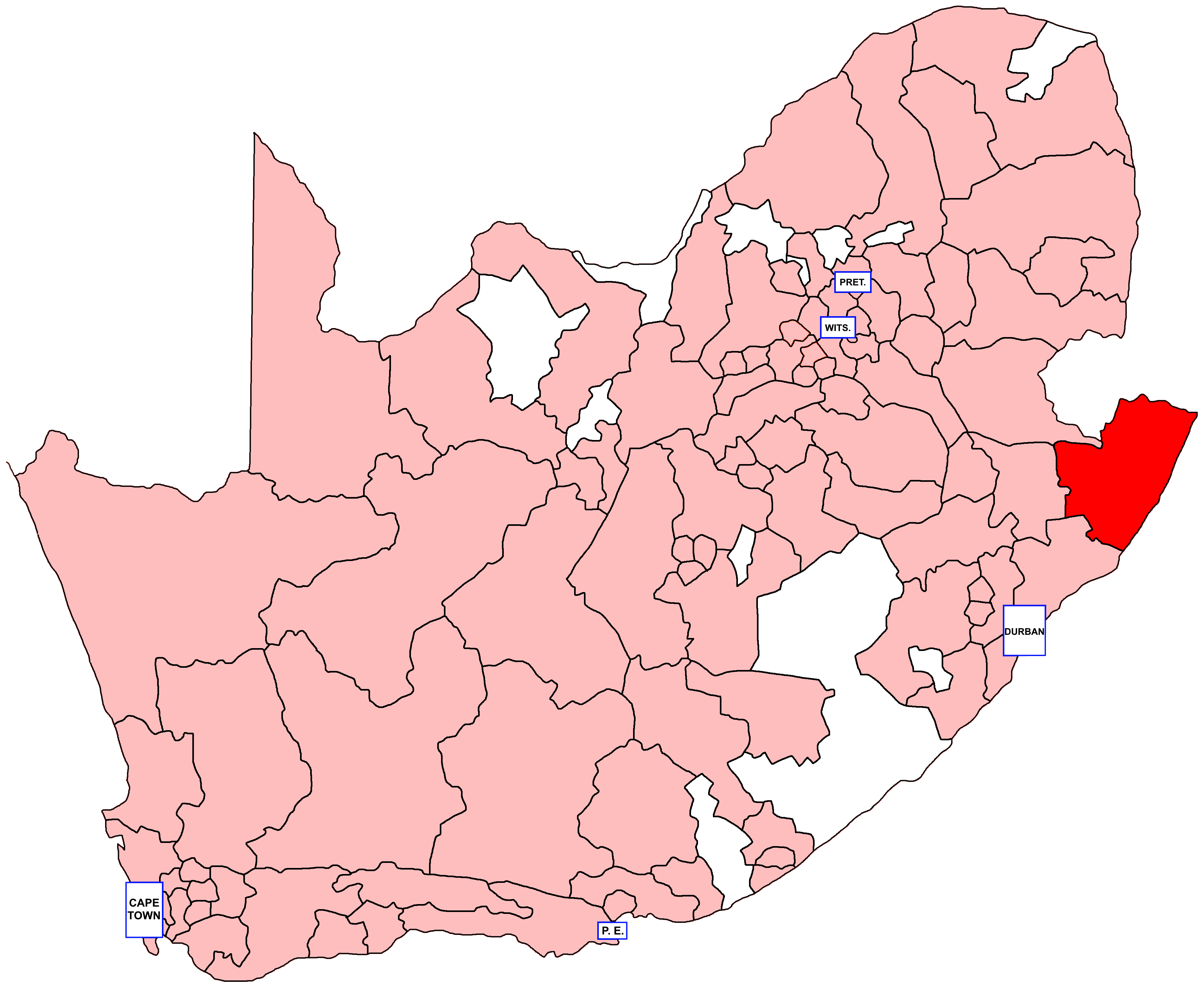
- Location of Umfolozi within South Africa (1981)
- Province: Natal

Former constituency
- Created: 1910
- Abolished: 1994
- Number of members: 1
- Replaced by: KwaZulu-Natal

Umfolozi was a constituency in the Natal Province of South Africa, which existed from 1910 to 1994. Named for the area of UMfolozi, throughout its existence it elected one member to the House of Assembly.

== Members ==
| Election | Parliament | Member | Party | Ref. |
|---|---|---|---|---|
| 1989 | 21st South African Parliament | James Schnetler | NP | |
