= Westdene (House of Assembly of South Africa constituency) =

South African constituency, 1910–1994

- Westdene
- Former constituency for the South African House of Assembly
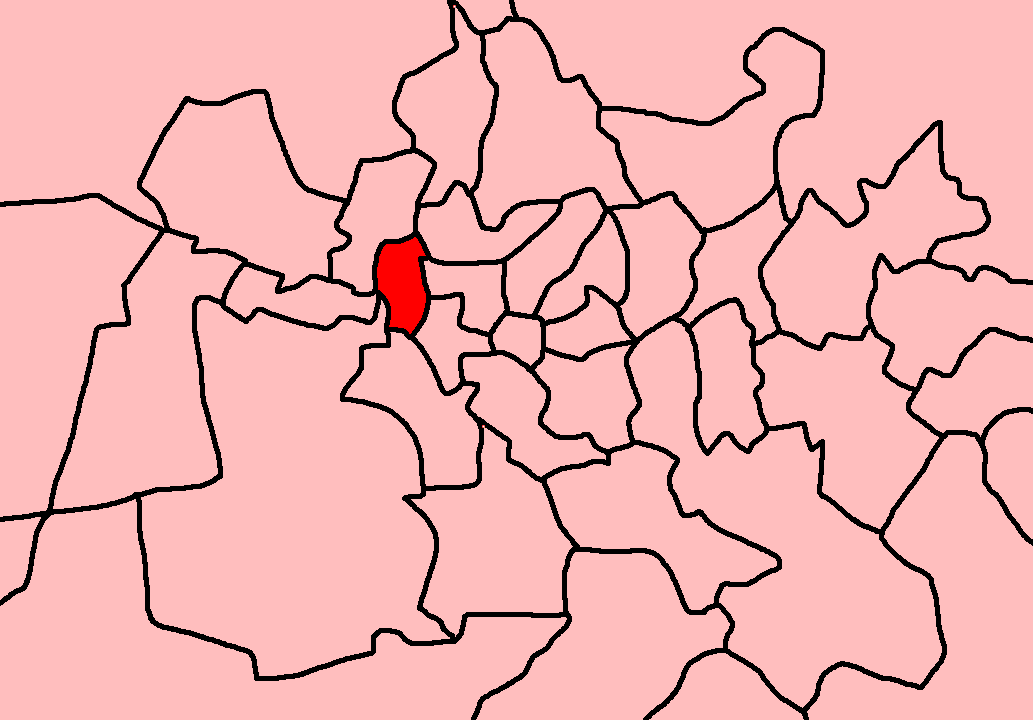
- Location of Westdene within Johannesburg (1981)
- Province: Transvaal
- Major settlements: Westdene

Former constituency
- Created: 1910
- Abolished: 1994
- Number of members: 1
- Replaced by: North West

Westdene was a constituency in the Transvaal Province of South Africa, which existed from 1910 to 1994. Named for the Johannesburg suburb of Westdene, throughout its existence it elected one member to the House of Assembly.

== Members ==
Election	Parliament	Member	Party
1940s		F. E. Mentz	Reunited National Party
1989	21st	Pik Botha	National Party
