= South African Indian Council =

Body created by the apartheid-era South African government

The South African Indian Council was a body created by the apartheid-era South African government in 1968 to make recommendations to the government about matters affecting Indian South Africans. It was the first time that Indian South Africans were granted any sort of representation at the national level. Nonetheless, it was widely rejected by South African Indians (in the 1981 election for example, only 6% of them voted).

In 1974, it was reconstituted as a body where 50% of the members were elected by Indian South Africans.

Amichand Rajbansi's National People's Party dominated the council, as it did the later House of Delegates in the Tricameral Parliament, although neither body enjoyed the support of the majority of Indian South Africans.
