= Umhlatuzana (House of Assembly of South Africa constituency) =

South African constituency, 1910–1994

- Umhlatuzana
- Former constituency for the South African House of Assembly
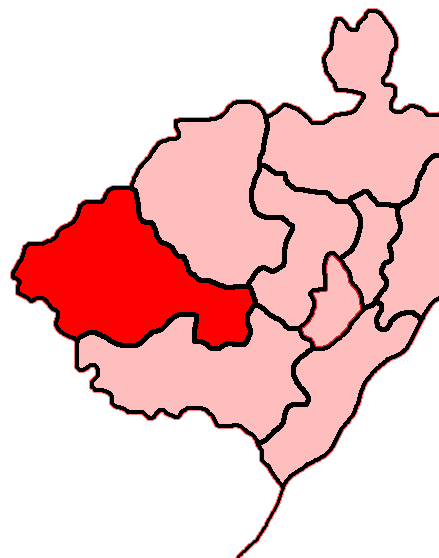
- Location of Umhlatuzana within South Africa (1981)
- Province: Natal

Former constituency
- Created: 1910
- Abolished: 1994
- Number of members: 1
- Replaced by: KwaZulu-Natal

Umhlatuzana was a constituency in the Natal Province of South Africa, which existed from 1910 to 1994. Named for the Umhlatuzana area of Durban, throughout its existence it elected one member to the House of Assembly.

== Members ==
Election	Parliament	Member	Party	Ref.
1989	21st South African Parliament	Johan Steenkamp	NP	
