= Michael Abraham (politician) =

South African politician (1952–2022)

Member of the National Assembly
- In office May 1994 – June 1999

Personal details
- Born: 25 May 1952 Mtunzini, Natal Province; Union of South Africa
- Died: 2022 (aged 69–70)
- Cause of death: Cancer
- Citizenship: South Africa
- Party: Inkatha Freedom Party (since 1993)
- Other political affiliations: National Party; Democratic Party

Michael Abraham (25 May 1952 – 15 January 2022) was a South African politician and lawyer who served in the National Assembly from 1994 to 1999. He represented the Inkatha Freedom Party (IFP), which he joined in 1993 while representing the Tongaat constituency in the apartheid-era House of Delegates.

== Life and career ==
Abraham was born on 25 May 1952 in Mtunzini on the North Coast of the former Natal Province. He matriculated at Stanger High School and practiced as a lawyer, while also acting as a Christian minister in Tongaat. He represented Tongaat in the House of Delegates, the Indian house of the Tricameral Parliament, variously as a member of the National Party, the Democratic Party, and, from April 1993, the IFP.

In the 1994 general election, he was elected to represent the IFP in the new multi-racial National Assembly. He was later a local councillor.

Abraham died of cancer on 15 January 2022.
