= Helderkruin (House of Assembly of South Africa constituency) =

South African constituency, 1910–1994

- Helderkruin
- Former constituency for the South African House of Assembly
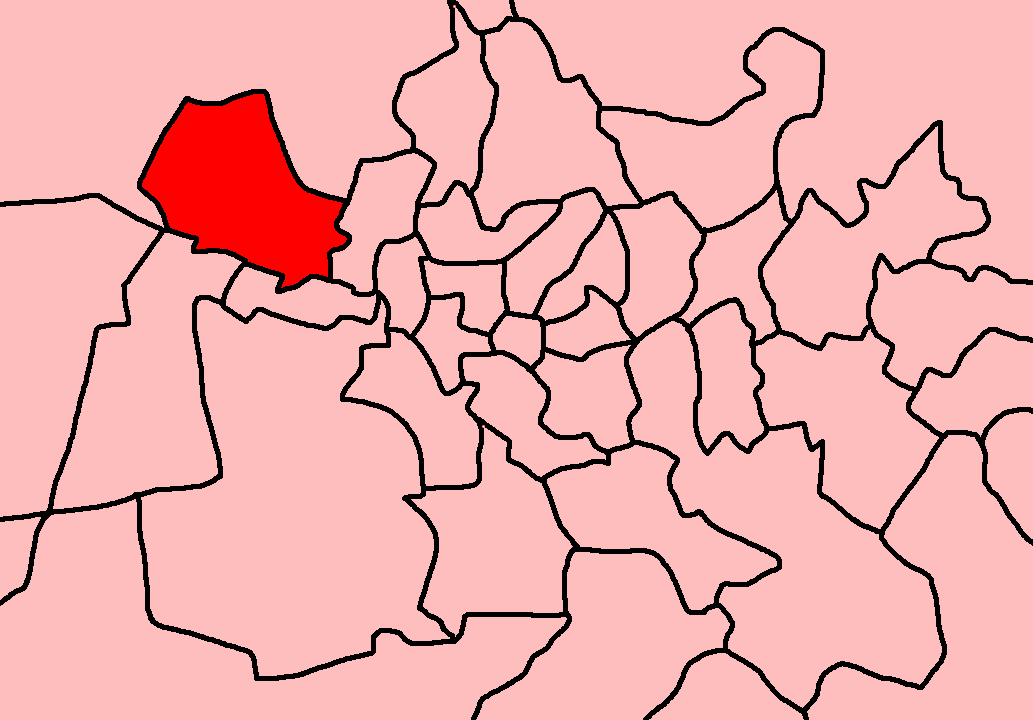
- Location of Helderkruin within Johannesburg (1981)
- Province: Transvaal

Former constituency
- Created: 1910
- Abolished: 1994
- Number of members: 1
- Replaced by: North West

Helderkruin was a constituency in the Transvaal Province of South Africa, which existed from 1910 to 1994. Named for the town of Helderkruin, throughout its existence it elected one member to the House of Assembly.

== Members ==
Election	Parliament	Member	Party	Ref.
1989	21st South African Parliament	Christoffel Johannes Van der Merwe	NP	
