= Solidarity (South African political party) =

Solidarity was a political party created in the lead-up to the 1984 South African general election, which determined the makeup of the first House of Delegates, the body within the Apartheid Tricameral Parliament reserved for Indian South Africans. It took its name from the Polish trade union.^{p. 40} Its first leader was JN Reddy, an influential banker and businessman with a number of company directorships. To be able to lead the party, Reddy relinquished some of his business interests. Another important party member was Pat Poovalingam, the chairman of weekly newspaper "The Graphic". Solidarity appealed more to South Africans with Southern Indian roots, while Amichand Rajbansi's National People's Party appealed more to those with a North Indian heritage.

The election of 1984 was marked by boycotts, as many Coloured and Indian South Africans saw the tricameral system as a means to entrench Apartheid. This resistance was led by the United Democratic Front. Despite having been formed less than a year before the election, Solidarity contested all 40 constituencies in the House of Delegates. The party campaigned on a platform of repealing discriminatory legislation in the economic field^{p. 59} and "peaceful change towards a just and democratic society with safeguards for minorities".

There were suggestions at the time that Solidarity was somehow initiated by the government, as Prime Minister P. W. Botha preferred Dr. Reddy to the leadership of the National People's Party,^{p. 59} a claim which was made more credible by the fact that some of the party leaders, including Reddy, had been members of government institutions, for example the President's Council. Another reason was that Solidarity was able to afford to spend more than its opponents on propaganda, although Solidarity claimed that this was all funded by personal contributions.

Despite winning most of the seats in the Natal province in the 1984 election, Solidarity was not able to win enough seats in the other provinces, and formed the opposition to the National People's Party.^{p. 59} The two parties had very similar political positions, so that plans were made for a merger. These plans were thwarted by a court action brought by Poovalingam. Instead, the parties agreed on a coalition, with two Solidarity members (JN Reddy and Ismail Kathrada) appointed to the Minister's Council. Five party members, including Poovalingam, refused to accept the coalition, and were suspended from the party. The coalition only lasted a few months, however, and dissolved, partly due to differences between the parties, but also because the Speaker of the House ruled that Solidarity could not be the official opposition while its leader served on the Council.^{p. 60}

In 1988, Rajbansi was removed from his position as chairman of the Minister's Council due to corruption, based on the preliminary findings of the James Commission of inquiry, and Reddy assumed this position in March 1989. In the 1989 South African general election in September, Solidarity was able to win 19 of the 45 seats (40 elected and 5 appointed). This result established it as the governing party in the House, motivating independents and members of smaller parties to join Solidarity and giving it a majority position. In 1991, Rajbansi briefly regained a majority in the House after a successful vote of no confidence in Reddy, but this was soon overturned, allowing Reddy to retain leadership of the House. In 1991, it was expected that conservative parties such as Solidarity would align themselves with the National Party, but Reddy denied rumours that the Solidarity leadership was discussing plans to join the National Party. The party did not take part in the first non-racial election in 1994.
