= Allan Hendrickse =

South African politician (1927–2005)

Chairman of the Ministers' Council House of Representatives
- In office September 1984 – 3 February 1992
- Preceded by: Alathea Jansen as Chairman of the Executive (Coloured Persons Representative Council)
- Succeeded by: Jac Rabie

1st Minister for Coloureds' Affairs
- In office 3 September 1984 – 24 August 1987
- Preceded by: Office established

Personal details
- Born: Helenard Joe Hendrickse; 22 October 1927 Uitenhage
- Died: 16 March 2005 Port Elizabeth
- Party: Labour Party (1969-1994; dissolved)
- Other political affiliations: African National Congress (1994-2005)
- Relations: Desmond Lockey (son-in-law)
- Children: Peter Hendrickse
- Occupation: Politician, minister, teacher
- Known for: Leadership of the Labour Party

Helenard Joe Hendrickse (22 October 1927 – 16 March 2005), popularly known as Allan Hendrickse, was a South African politician, Congregationalist minister and teacher. He was a founder of the 1969–1994 Labour Party of South Africa and a leader of the South African House of Representatives, and he participated in an act of defiance by swimming at a South African beach reserved for Whites only.

== Personal life ==
Hendrickse was born in Uitenhage in the Eastern Cape and studied at Fort Hare University in the Eastern Cape, where he met key ANC figures Nelson Mandela, Oliver Tambo, and future President of Zimbabwe Robert Mugabe. He was married in 1957 and had four children. Hendrickse died of a heart attack at Port Elizabeth Airport on 16 March 2005, aged 77.

== Political career ==
In 1969, he became one of the founders of the Labour Party, which represented Coloured people on the Coloured Peoples' Representative Council. He helped open "Coloured" schools to students of all races. After 1984, the Labour Party dominated the House of Representatives, one of the houses in South Africa's Tricameral Parliament, and Hendrickse served in P. W. Botha's Cabinet. Hendrickse and Labour drew the ire of the United Democratic Front and African National Congress for this collaboration with apartheid; Hendrickse defended himself on the grounds that he would oppose apartheid from within. His swim at a whites-only beach took place in 1987; on Botha's demand, Hendrickse later apologized for the swim.

Hendrickse ultimately resigned from Botha's cabinet on 24 August 1987. Botha wished to postpone elections until 1992. His justification was that the extended term was required in order to push planned reforms. Hendrickse's approval was needed, as postponing the election required the approval of all three houses. He initially backed the decision, however, Botha's refusal to schedule reforms and disregard for Hendrickse and the Labour Party, led Hendrickse to reconsider. Botha became enraged, insulting Hendrickse, the Labour Party and the Coloureds. Hendrickse announced his resignation to the House of Representatives, who had already endorsed his decision.

Hendrickse lost control of the House of Representatives in 1992 after losing a confidence vote to Labour members who had crossed the floor to the National Party, led by Jac Rabie, and independents. Hendrickse led the remains of the Labour Party into the ANC in 1994. He served as an ANC MP from that year until his retirement from politics in 1999.

He was awarded the Order of the Baobab (Silver Class) in 2004. A letter signed by President Thabo Mbeki and read at Hendrickse's funeral saluted him as a "freedom fighter and architect of democracy".
