= Peter Hendrickse =

South African politician

Member of the National Assembly
- In office May 1994 – May 2009

Personal details
- Born: 31 May 1958 (age 67)
- Citizenship: South Africa
- Party: African National Congress (since 1994)
- Other political affiliations: Labour Party (until 1994)
- Relations: Allan Hendrickse (father)

Peter Alroy Charles Hendrickse (born 31 May 1958) is a South African politician who represented the African National Congress (ANC) in the National Assembly from 1994 to 2009. During apartheid, he represented the Labour Party, which was led by his father, Allan Hendrickse.

== Early life ==
Hendrickse was born on 31 May 1958. He is the son of the Reverend Allan Hendrickse, who led the opposition Labour Party during apartheid.

== Legislative career ==
While still in his twenties, and like his father and brothers, Hendrickse represented the Labour Party in the Tricameral Parliament during apartheid. In South Africa's first post-apartheid elections in 1994, he stood as a candidate for the ANC and was elected to a seat in the National Assembly. He was re-elected to his seat in 1999. Though he was not initially re-elected in 2004, he was sworn in shortly after the start of the legislative term, in July 2004, after Mzwandile Masala resigned. The ANC did not nominate him to stand for a fourth term in the 2009 general election.
