= Democratic Reform Party (South Africa) =

Defunct political party in South Africa

Democratic Reform Party of South Africa
- Ideology: Anti-apartheid

The Democratic Reform Party of South Africa was a party active in the South African coloured community in the late apartheid years. It won five of the eighty seats in the segregated House of Representatives and formed the official opposition against the Labour Party's 69 seats. As the official opposition in the House of Representatives it took part in the CODESA negotiations to end apartheid.
