= United Nations Security Council Resolution 554 =

UN Security Council Resolution 554
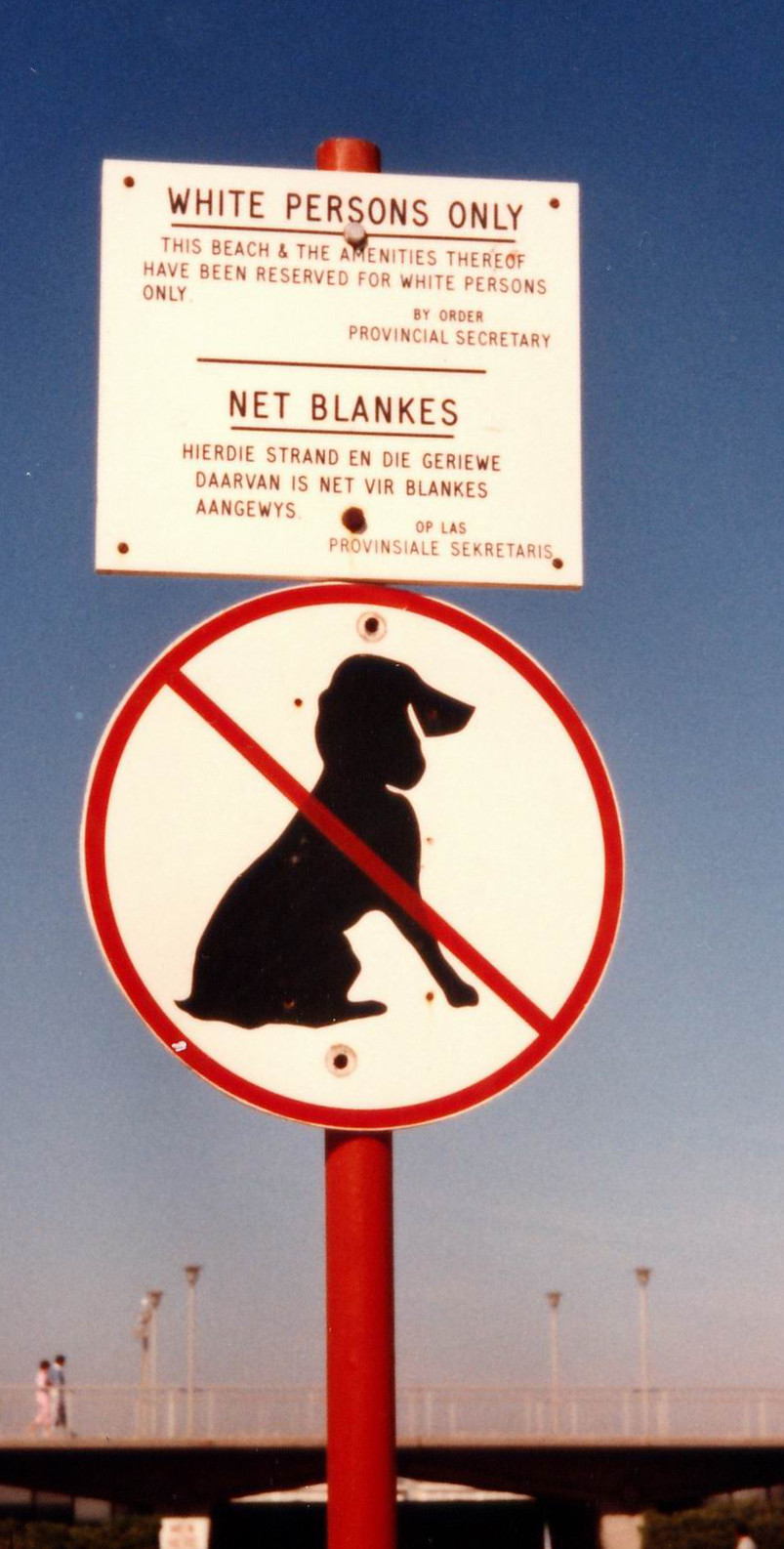
- Apartheid-era sign
- Date: 17 August 1984
- Meeting no.: 2,551
- Code: S/RES/554 (Document)
- Subject: South Africa
- Voting summary: 13 voted for; None voted against; 2 abstained
- Result: Adopted

Security Council composition
- Permanent members: China; France; Soviet Union; United Kingdom; United States
- Non-permanent members: Burkina Faso; Egypt; India; Malta; Netherlands; Nicaragua; Pakistan; Peru; Ukrainian SSR; Zimbabwe

United Nations Security Council resolution 554, adopted on 17 August 1984, after recalling 473 (1980), the Council condemned the 1984 general election in South Africa and the adoption of the Constitution of the Republic of South Africa Act (110 of 1983).

The Council stated that the constitution was against the United Nations Charter and declared the elections and constitution both null and void as it would further entrench minority rule in the country. The resolution also urged Member States and international organisations not to accord recognition to the elections, stating that the total eradication of apartheid and the establishment of democracy in South Africa would lead to a just and lasting solution to the "explosive situation" in the country.

The resolution, which required the Secretary-General to monitor its implementation, was approved by 13 votes to none against, while the United Kingdom and United States abstained from voting.

== See also ==
- Elections in South Africa
- List of United Nations Security Council Resolutions 501 to 600 (1982–1987)
- Apartheid
