= 1984 South African general election =

- 22 August 1984
- House of Representatives (coloured)
- All 80 seats in the House of Representatives; 41 seats needed for a majority
- Turnout: 30.94%
Party	Leader	Vote %	Seats
Labour	Allan Hendrickse	74.93	76
People's Congress	Peter Marais	11.86	2
Freedom	Arthur Booysen	5.05	1
Independents	–	7.18	1
This lists parties that won seats. See the complete results below.
- House of Delegates (Indian)
- All 40 seats in the House of Delegates; 21 seats needed for a majority
- Turnout: 20.80%
Party	Leader	Vote %	Seats
National People's	Amichand Rajbansi	36.12	18
Solidarity	JN Reddy	36.62	17
Progressive Independent	Faiz Khan	1.60	1
Independents	–	24.88	4
This lists parties that won seats. See the complete results below.

General elections were held in South Africa in August 1984 to elect coloured and Indian representatives to their respective houses of the Tricameral Parliament. The coloured elections for the House of Representatives took place on 22 August, and resulted in a victory for the Labour Party, headed by the Reverend Allan Hendrickse, which won 76 of the 80 seats. The Indian elections for the House of Delegates were held on 28 August and saw the National People's Party emerge as the largest party, winning 18 of the 40 seats. The Indian elections were opposed by the United Democratic Front and were marked by boycotts and protests.

Despite the Prohibition of Political Interference Act of 1968 which banned mixed-race political parties, nine Indian members of Hendrickse's Labour Party stood as independents, one of whom won a seat and subsequently joined the NPP.

== Background ==
In addition to the whites-only House of Assembly, a November 1983 referendum had approved the creation of two new houses an 80-member House of Representatives for coloureds and a 40-member House of Delegates for Indians.

== Results ==
=== House of Representatives ===
Party	Votes	%	Seats
Labour Party	200,335	74.93	76
People's Congress Party	31,701	11.86	2
Freedom Party	13,505	5.05	1
Reformed Freedom Party	2,632	0.98	0
Independents	19,204	7.18	1
Total	267,377	100.00	80
Valid votes	267,377	97.99	
Invalid/blank votes	5,477	2.01	
Total votes	272,854	100.00	
Registered voters/turnout	881,984	30.94	

==== By constituency ====
Constituency	Freedom	Independent	Labour	People's Congress	Reformed Freedom
Addo	0.00%	0.00%	74.49%	16.47%	9.05%
Alra Park	9.20%	0.00%	82.28%	8.52%	0.00%
Belhar	0.00%	47.52%	52.48%	0.00%	0.00%
Berg River	0.00%	25.58%	74.42%	0.00%	0.00%
Bethelsdorp	0.00%	0.00%	96.71%	3.29%	0.00%
Bishop Lavis	0.00%	0.00%	65.04%	34.96%	0.00%
Bloemfontein Opkoms	5.20%	0.00%	84.60%	0.00%	10.21%
Bokkeveld	0.00%	50.26%	49.74%	0.00%	0.00%
Bonteheuwel	0.00%	0.00%	94.86%	5.14%	0.00%
Border	10.30%	0.00%	87.76%	1.95%	0.00%
Bosmont	50.00%	0.00%	50.00%	0.00%	0.00%
Britstown	0.00%	0.00%	83.76%	16.24%	0.00%
Daljosaphat	0.00%	20.96%	56.13%	22.91%	0.00%
Diamant	0.00%	13.19%	69.05%	17.75%	0.00%
Diaz	0.00%	0.00%	78.03%	21.97%	0.00%
Durban Suburbs	0.00%	0.00%	69.08%	30.92%	0.00%
Dysseldorp	0.00%	0.00%	92.22%	7.78%	0.00%
Eastern Free State	0.00%	0.00%	100.00%	0.00%	0.00%
Eersterus	20.65%	0.00%	62.95%	16.40%	0.00%
Eldorado Park	10.64%	0.00%	69.75%	12.41%	7.20%
Elsies River	0.00%	0.00%	87.15%	12.85%	0.00%
Esselen Park	0.00%	7.54%	60.46%	31.99%	0.00%
Fish River	8.94%	0.00%	75.88%	15.18%	0.00%
Gelvandale	7.51%	0.00%	84.30%	8.19%	0.00%
Genadendal	0.00%	0.00%	100.00%	0.00%	0.00%
Grassy Park	0.00%	0.00%	0.00%	96.47%	3.53%
Greenwood Park	0.00%	11.44%	82.36%	6.19%	0.00%
Griqualand West	0.00%	6.49%	76.69%	16.82%	0.00%
Haarlem	0.00%	0.00%	77.73%	12.37%	9.90%
Hanover Park	0.00%	0.00%	81.79%	18.21%	0.00%
Hantam	0.00%	0.00%	75.74%	24.26%	0.00%
Hawston	0.00%	35.38%	64.62%	0.00%	0.00%
Heidedal	3.80%	6.61%	89.59%	0.00%	0.00%
Heideveld	0.00%	0.00%	68.02%	31.98%	0.00%
Kalahari	6.85%	0.00%	91.92%	1.23%	0.00%
Karee	0.00%	32.76%	67.24%	0.00%	0.00%
Kasselsvlei	0.00%	26.08%	58.38%	7.50%	8.04%
Klipspruit West	23.44%	11.28%	60.18%	5.10%	0.00%
Liesbeek	0.00%	0.00%	85.22%	14.78%	0.00%
Macassar	0.00%	13.33%	69.10%	17.57%	0.00%
Mamre	0.00%	0.00%	94.24%	5.76%	0.00%
Manenberg	0.00%	0.00%	66.82%	29.09%	4.09%
Matroosfontein	0.00%	0.00%	77.40%	14.91%	7.69%
Mid Karoo	0.00%	6.02%	91.74%	2.24%	0.00%
Mitchells Plain	0.00%	0.00%	83.50%	12.62%	3.88%
Natal Interior	0.00%	0.00%	76.51%	23.49%	0.00%
Natal Mid-East	0.00%	26.60%	64.22%	9.17%	0.00%
Newclare	17.84%	0.00%	67.50%	14.66%	0.00%
Northeastern Cape	18.66%	0.00%	71.90%	9.45%	0.00%
Northern Cape	7.67%	21.62%	65.52%	5.19%	0.00%
Northern Transvaal	13.62%	0.00%	78.10%	8.28%	0.00%
Nuweveld	0.00%	0.00%	83.96%	16.04%	0.00%
Ottery	0.00%	0.00%	42.97%	57.03%	0.00%
Outeniqua	0.00%	0.00%	63.70%	36.30%	0.00%
Pniel	0.00%	0.00%	100.00%	0.00%	0.00%
Ravensmead	0.00%	12.05%	80.27%	6.07%	1.61%
Rawsonville	0.00%	19.15%	80.85%	0.00%	0.00%
Reiger Park	1.89%	13.79%	84.32%	0.00%	0.00%
Retreat	0.00%	0.00%	84.28%	15.72%	0.00%
Rietvlei	0.00%	32.00%	65.58%	2.42%	0.00%
Riversdal	0.00%	50.97%	49.03%	0.00%	0.00%
Robertson	0.00%	8.14%	91.86%	0.00%	0.00%
Ruste Ter Vaal	24.30%	0.00%	75.70%	0.00%	0.00%
Schauderville	19.36%	0.00%	74.39%	6.26%	0.00%
Silvertown	0.00%	0.00%	88.28%	11.72%	0.00%
Southern Cape	0.00%	0.00%	90.86%	9.14%	0.00%
Southern Free State	0.00%	0.00%	100.00%	0.00%	0.00%
Springbok	16.47%	0.00%	65.91%	0.00%	17.63%
Steinkopf	16.61%	31.46%	51.94%	0.00%	0.00%
Strandfontein	0.00%	0.00%	80.29%	12.12%	7.59%
Suurbraak	36.25%	4.49%	59.26%	0.00%	0.00%
Swartkops	0.00%	0.00%	77.76%	22.24%	0.00%
Swartland	0.00%	0.00%	72.64%	27.36%	0.00%
Table Mountain	0.00%	0.00%	50.64%	49.36%	0.00%
Toekomsrus	41.44%	7.01%	51.55%	0.00%	0.00%
Upington	0.00%	0.00%	91.70%	8.30%	0.00%
Vredendal	0.00%	0.00%	63.66%	36.34%	0.00%
Wentworth	0.00%	0.00%	54.11%	45.89%	0.00%
Western Free State	1.97%	0.00%	91.22%	6.81%	0.00%
Wuppertal	0.00%	14.84%	74.81%	10.35%	0.00%

=== House of Delegates ===
Party	Votes	%	Seats
National People's Party	29,862	36.12	18
Solidarity	30,276	36.62	17
Progressive Independent Party	1,322	1.60	1
National Federal Party	633	0.77	0
National Democratic Party	14	0.02	0
Independents	20,568	24.88	4
Total	82,675	100.00	40
Valid votes	82,675	98.88	
Invalid/blank votes	936	1.12	
Total votes	83,611	100.00	
Registered voters/turnout	401,901	20.80	

==== By constituency ====
Constituency	NPP	Solidarity	PIP	NFP	Ind
Actonville	–	18.43%	–	11.97%	69.59%
Allandale	–	48.26%	–	–	51.74%
Arena Park	73.17%	26.83%	–	–	–
Bayview	27.55%	56.28%	–	–	16.17%
Brickfield	51.18%	14.67%	–	–	34.15%
Camperdown	41.10%	51.90%	–	–	7.00%
Cavendish	18.71%	41.18%	–	4.67%	35.44%
Central Rand	2.36%	51.30%	0.24%	–	46.09%
Chatsworth Central	44.12%	47.73%	–	8.14%	–
Clare Estate	29.90%	17.44%	–	–	52.66%
Durban Bay	52.26%	3.40%	–	–	44.34%
Eastern Transvaal	18.09%	46.65%	–	–	35.27%
Glenview	22.51%	77.49%	–	–	–
Havenside	–	66.17%	–	–	33.83%
Isipingo	40.05%	37.65%	–	–	22.30%
Laudium	57.67%	9.32%	–	–	33.01%
Lenasia Central	40.84%	25.38%	19.27%	–	14.50%
Lenasia East	24.93%	26.25%	42.78%	–	6.04%
Lenasia West	47.39%	23.75%	7.66%	–	21.20%
Malabar	81.12%	0.32%	–	–	18.56%
Marianhill	50.62%	48.33%	–	–	1.05%
Merebank	31.93%	47.32%	–	–	20.76%
Montford	40.80%	48.58%	–	–	10.62%
Moorcross	47.02%	37.45%	–	–	15.52%
Natal Midlands	47.03%	20.63%	–	–	32.34%
Newholme	41.80%	19.42%	–	–	38.78%
North Coast	82.96%	17.04%	–	–	–
North Western Transvaal	40.42%	14.55%	–	–	45.03%
Northern Natal	40.72%	31.72%	13.68%	–	13.88%
Northwestern Cape	35.05%	20.00%	–	–	44.95%
Phoenix	21.60%	34.81%	–	–	43.58%
Redhill	69.66%	21.37%	–	–	8.97%
Reservoir Hills	41.58%	53.73%	–	4.69%	–
Rylands	22.91%	58.00%	–	–	19.09%
Southern Natal	21.42%	48.95%	13.54%	–	15.75%
Springfield	25.39%	51.64%	4.63%	–	18.34%
Stanger	27.14%	72.46%	–	–	0.40%
Tongaat	23.40%	20.01%	0.59%	–	56.00%
Umzinto	35.62%	32.88%	–	–	31.32%
Verulam	26.47%	44.19%	–	–	29.34%
Source: Constituency Level Election Archive

== Reactions ==
The United Nations Security Council passed Resolution 554 (1984) condemning the election, declaring it null and void as it was designed to entrench minority rule.
