= Coloured Persons Representative Council =

Quasi-legislative apartheid body with limited powers

Coloured Persons Representative Council Verteenwoordigende Kleurlingraad

History
- Established: 1969
- Disbanded: 1980
- Preceded by: Union Council for Coloured Affairs
- Succeeded by: House of Representatives

Leadership
- Chairman of the Executive: Tom Swartz (1969–1975); Sonny Leon (1975); Alathea Jansen (1975–1980)
- Seats: 60 (40 elected, 20 nominated)

Elections
- Voting system: First-past-the-post with single-member divisions
- Last election: 19 March 1975

Meeting place
- Proteaville, Bellville, Cape Town

The Coloured Persons Representative Council of the Republic of South Africa was a partially elected council with limited legislative powers, intended to represent coloured South Africans during the apartheid era. It was first elected in 1969, re-elected in 1975, and permanently dissolved in 1980. In 1984 the House of Representatives was created to represent coloured voters in the Tricameral Parliament.

== Election results ==
30 September 1969:

Party	Elected	Appointed	Total
Labour Party	26	0	26
Federal Party	11	20	31
National Coloured Peoples' Party	1	0	1
Republican Party	1	0	1
Independent	1	0	1
Total	40	20	60

19 March 1975:

Party	Elected	Appointed	Total
Labour Party	31	4	35
Federal Party	8	9	17
Social Democratic Party	0	1	1
Independent	1	6	7
Total	40	20	60

== Laws enacted ==
In the course of its existence the CPRC only passed a small number of laws:

- Law No. 1 of 1971: the Coloured Persons Rehabilitation Centres Law, 1971
- Law No. 1 of 1972: the Coloured Persons Rehabilitation Centres Amendment Law, 1972
- Law No. 1 of 1973: the Coloured Farmers Assistance Law, 1973
- Law No. 1 of 1974: the Coloured Persons Social Pensions Law, 1974
- Law No. 1 of 1977: the Coloured Persons Rehabilitation Centres Amendment Law, 1977
- Law No. 1 of 1979: the Rural Coloured Areas Law, 1979
