= Hennie Bekker (politician) =

South African politician (born 1942)

National Assembly of South Africa
- In office 23 April 2004 – May 2009
- In office May 1994 – March 2003

Member of the House of Assembly
- In office 1987–1994

Personal details
- Born: Hendrik Jacobus Bekker; 7 July 1942 (age 84)
- Citizenship: South Africa
- Party: Inkatha Freedom Party (since 1994)
- Other political affiliations: National Party (until 1994)
- Spouse: Gerda Bekker

Hendrik Jacobus "Hennie" Bekker (born 7 July 1942) is a South African politician who served in the Parliament of South Africa from 1987 to 2009, excepting a brief hiatus in the KwaZulu-Natal Provincial Legislature from 2003 to 2004. He represented the National Party (NP) until the end of apartheid in 1994, after which he joined the Inkatha Freedom Party (IFP).

== Early career ==
Bekker was born on 7 July 1942 and is from present-day Gauteng. He has a doctorate in business administration from the unaccredited Almeda University. Between 1964 and 1981, he worked in corporate banking and business, including at Sanlam.

In 1981, he launched his political career with the National Party (NP), which governed South Africa during apartheid; he initially served as a Member of the Provincial Council in the Transvaal and then joined Parliament in 1987, representing a constituency in the Transvaal. During the democratic transition, he, alongside Derek Keys, represented the NP on the transitional economic council from 1993.

== Post-apartheid political career: 1994–2009 ==
Ahead of South Africa's first post-apartheid elections in 1994, Bekker left the NP to join the Inkatha Freedom Party (IFP), a majority Zulu party. Under the IFP banner, he was elected to a seat in the new National Assembly. He was re-elected to his legislative seat the next general election in 1999 and also served as the IFP's economic spokesperson. In March 2003, he resigned from the National Assembly to join the IFP's caucus in the KwaZulu-Natal Provincial Legislature, though he returned to the National Assembly for a final term after the 2004 general election. He also retained several private business interests.

== Personal life ==
Bekker is married to politician Gerda Bekker, with whom he has three children and several grandchildren.
