= Abdul Ganie Mohamed =

South African politician (born 1937)

Member of the National Assembly
- In office May 1994 – June 1999

Personal details
- Born: 4 November 1937 (age 88)
- Citizenship: South Africa
- Party: National Party

Abdul Ganie Mohamed (born 4 November 1937) is a retired South African politician who represented the National Party in the National Assembly from 1994 to 1999. He was elected in the 1994 general election. Though he stood for re-election in 1999, the New National Party, successor to the NP, ranked him 24th on its regional party list for the Western Cape, and he therefore failed to gain re-election.

In August 1995, Mohamed was mugged of more than R70,000 at the Carousel Casino outside Pretoria. The pair who robbed him said that they had taken his money after he tried to solicit sex from one of them, a sex worker, but Mohamed said that it was a straightforward robbery, occurring inside the casino after his tea was spiked with a muscle relaxant. Four people were found guilty of the robbery in October 1997.
