= Johan Steenkamp =

South African politician

Member of the National Assembly
- In office 1994–1999

Personal details
- Born: Pieter Johannes Steenkamp; 14 February 1943 (age 83)
- Citizenship: South Africa
- Party: United Democratic Movement
- Other political affiliations: National Party

Pieter Johannes Steenkamp (born 14 February 1943) is a retired South African politician who represented the National Party in the National Assembly during the first democratic Parliament from 1994 to 1999. He was elected to his seat in the 1994 general election.

In early 1999, he resigned from Parliament and defected to the recently formed United Democratic Movement (UDM). In the 1999 general election, he stood for election to the National Assembly under the UDM's banner, but he was not ranked highly enough to be elected. He served as the UDM's parliamentary liaison officer instead.
