= Francois Jacobsz =

South African politician

Personal details
- Citizenship: South Africa
- Political party: National Party
- Education: Grey College, Bloemfontein

Francois Paul Jacobsz is a South African politician who represented the National Party (NP) in Parliament. He served in the House of Assembly during apartheid, representing a constituency in the former Transvaal, and he was also elected to a seat in the new National Assembly in South Africa's first post-apartheid elections in 1994. However, he did not complete his term.

Jacobsz is an economist by profession and attended Grey College in Bloemfontein. Ahead of the 2004 general election, when the NP was defunct, News24 reported that he was supporting the Freedom Front Plus.
