= National People's Party (South Africa, 1981) =

- Leader: Amichand Rajbansi
- Founded: 1981
- Succeeded by: Minority Front

The National People's Party was a South African political party founded in 1981 by Amichand Rajbansi. It participated in political structures established for Indian South Africans during the apartheid era: first the South African Indian Council, and then the House of Delegates in the Tricameral Parliament.

The NPP controlled the South African Indian Council after its election in 1981. When the House of Delegates was created at the election of 1984, the NPP won 18 of 40 elected seats. In the election of 1989 it won only 8 seats, coming second to the Solidarity Party.

After the end of apartheid in 1994 the party reformed as the Minority Front.

== Electoral history ==
=== House of Delegates elections ===
Election	Party leader	Votes	%	Seats	+/–	Position
1984	Amichand Rajbansi	29,862	36.12%	18 / 40	▲18	▲1st
1989	Amichand Rajbansi	38,523	24.9%	9 / 45	▼9	▼2nd
