= Amichand Rajbansi =

South African politician (1942–2011)

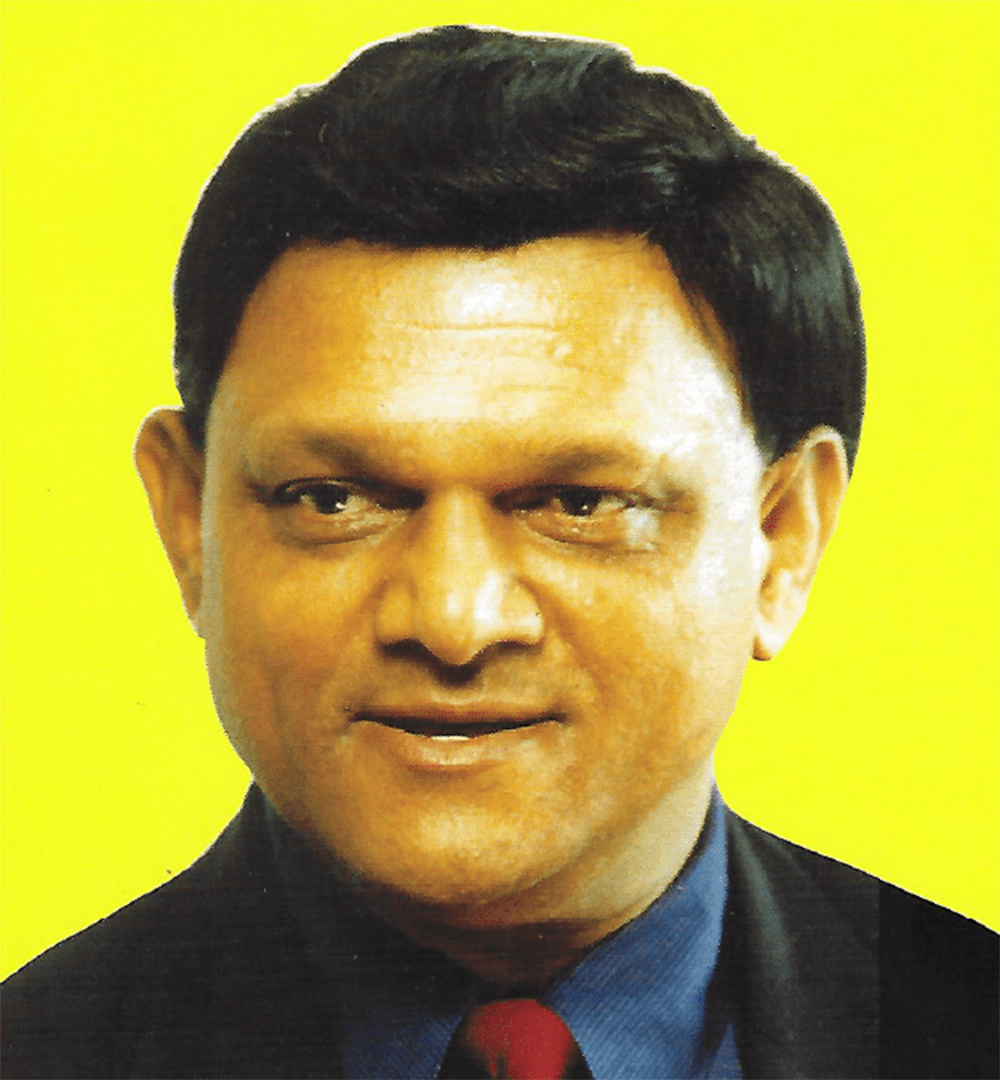

Minister of Indian Affairs
- In office 1984–1989
- President: P. W. Botha
- Preceded by: Chris Heunis

Member of Parliament for Arena Park
- In office 1984–1994

Personal details
- Born: 14 January 1942 Clairwood, Durban, South Africa
- Died: 29 December 2011 (aged 69) Umhlanga, KwaZulu-Natal
- Spouses: Asha Devi (div. 2000) Shameen Thakur-Rajbansi (m. 2001)

Amichand Rajbansi (14 January 1942 – 29 December 2011), nicknamed the Bengal Tiger, was a South African politician. He was a former chairman of the Ministers' Council of the House of Delegates Tricameral parliamentary chamber for Indian people, and leader of the Minority Front.

== Early life and education ==
Amichand Rajbansi was born in Clairwood, Durban, on 14 January 1942.

He attended Clairwood High School and the University College for Indians to study history. and psychology as major subjects.

== Career ==
After a long service as a sports administrator, professional soccer referee, civic leader, and serving in local government structures dealing with local affairs, Rajbansi was elected to the South African Indian Council in 1974. This council was rejected by most Indians. In 1976 Rajbansi resigned from the Indian Council protesting the inter Cabinet council between the Indian Council and government cabinet of Prime Minister John Vorster. In 1981 he formed the National People's Party (NPP) and was elected leader of this new party. The NPP successfully competed for the election to the South African Indian Council and took control of SAIC, although only 6% of the Indian electorate participated in the 1981 elections for the council.

In 1984, following Prime Minister PW Botha's constitutional reforms, the NPP stood for the newly constituted House of Delegates, the Indian only parliamentary chamber, and won the majority of seats in the House. As a result, Rajbansi became a member of the South African Cabinet and chairman for the Ministers' Council for Indian Affairs.

Rajbansi's leadership of the House of Delegates was often controversial, and in May 1987, his NPP lost its majority to an opposition coalition. However, Rajbansi did not resign his chairmanship, and he survived the leadership challenge with the help of P.W. Botha. A Parliamentary select committee later in 1987 found that Rajbansi accepted R10 000 for his party in order to "facilitate the obtaining of land and contracts", and he was suspended from the House of Delegates. He was suspended from P.W. Botha's cabinet, and Botha appointed a commission of enquiry under Justice Neville James to investigate allegations of corruption in the House of Delegates Administration. He was later found guilty by another parliamentary committee of "glaring" maladministration in forcing the purchase of a cultural centre for an inflated price. Botha fired Rajbansi from his cabinet and his Minister's Council in December 1988, following the preliminary report from the James Commission. The final report of the commission described Rajbansi as "arrogant", "unscrupulous", "ruthless" and a "mean-minded bully". The commission found that Rajbansi had lied to Parliament, committed statutory perjury, had given false evidence to the commission, and misused his position. It also recommended that he never again be employed as a minister in the House of Delegates or in any official or semi-official post which called for integrity. He later resigned as leader of the NPP, and was suspended from the House of Delegates, only to be reinstated a few months later. In June 1990, he was convicted on 2 counts of fraud, and was fined R10 000 for using "fronts" to obtain premises for his businesses when he was a member of the SA Indian Council.

After South Africa's transition to multi-racial democracy in 1994, the NPP became the Minority Front and continued to draw support from parts of the Indian community.

After the 2004 elections, Rajbansi made an alliance with the African National Congress and he became MEC for Sports and Recreation for KwaZulu-Natal Province.

== Recognition and awards ==
In January 2009, Rajbansi received a Lifetime Achievement Award from the India International Friendship Society in New Delhi, in recognition of his selfless service to humanity. He was the only African to receive this award.

== Personal life and death ==
Rajbansi was formerly married to Asha Devi, a journalist and popular figure in local government. Devi spoke to Jani Allan in an interview published by the Sunday Times in the 1980s about her affection for her husband. She referred to her husband as "her hero". "Even if it means sleeping on a bed of nails or walking on coals for him, I will do it ... I will always stand by him." They also had four daughters and a son together. Their relationship soured when Devi joined the IFP. The couple separated in 1998, with political and alleged paranormal activity in their marital home being cited as reasons attributed to their separation. The couple divorced in 2000. A year later Rajbansi married Shameen Thakur.

In 2003 Rajbansi's ex-daughter-in-law, Karnagie Tandree, was strangled to death Police have deliberated over both murder and suicide as a cause of the death.

On 29 December 2011, Rajbansi died from natural causes.
