= House of Delegates (South Africa) =

Parliamentary house for the Indian section of the population

House of Delegates Raad van Afgevaardigdes

Type
- Type: Indian representative house

History
- Established: 1984
- Disbanded: 1994
- Preceded by: South African Indian Council
- Succeeded by: National Assembly

Elections
- Voting system: First-past-the-post
- Last election: 6 September 1989

Meeting place
- Marks Building; Cape Town, Cape Province (until 1987); New Assembly Building; Houses of Parliament, Cape Town

The House of Delegates (Afrikaans: Raad van Afgevaardigdes) was a body in the Tricameral Parliament of South Africa which existed from 1984 to 1994. It was reserved for Indian South Africans. The body was elected twice; in 1984 and 1989. It was the second time in South Africa's history that ethnic Indians had ever had any sort of representation at the national level, the first being the South African Indian Council. It was originally to be called the Chamber of Deputies.

The first debating chamber of the House of Delegates was located in Marks Building, a building that was located across the road from Houses of Parliament, Cape Town. Upon its completion in 1987, the house was moved to a debating chamber on the floor above the new chamber designed for joint-sittings of the Tricameral Parliament. The executive arm of the House of Delegates was a Ministers' Council, led by a Chairman. The civil service that dealt with Indian "own affairs" (including education, health and welfare, local government, housing and agriculture) was called Administration: House of Delegates, and was based in Durban.

== Elections ==
Electoral turnouts for elections to the House of Delegates were poor.

Election results:

Election	Date	Total seats	National People's Party	Solidarity	Others	Indep.
1984 election	28 August 1984	40	18	17	1	4
1989 election	6 September 1989	40	8	16	10	6

== Leadership ==
The following served as Chairman of the Minister's Council of the House of Delegates:

- Amichand Rajbansi (September 1984 – 31 December 1988)
- Kassipershad Ramduth (1 January – 21 March 1989, acting)
- Jayaram Narainsamy Reddy (21 March 1989 – February 1993)
- Bhadra Ranchod (February 1993 – March 1994)
