= Labour Party (South Africa, 1969) =

Political party in South Africa from 1969 to 1994

Labour Party of South Africa Arbeidersparty van Suid-Afrika (Afrikaans)
- Leader: Allan Hendrickse
- Founded: 1969
- Dissolved: 1994
- Merged into: African National Congress
- Headquarters: Cape Town
- Ideology: Coloured people's rights Anti-apartheid
- Political position: Centre-left to left-wing

The Labour Party of South Africa (Afrikaans: Arbeidersparty van Suid-Afrika) was a South African political party founded in 1969 and led for many years by Allan Hendrickse. Although avowedly opposed to apartheid, it participated in the Coloured Persons Representative Council. It opposed the guerrilla struggle of Umkhonto we Sizwe and the call for international sanctions against South Africa. The party later dominated the House of Representatives in the Tricameral Parliament from its foundation in 1984 until 1992, winning 76 of the 80 seats in the 1984 elections and 69 in those of 1989. When the National Party of F. W. de Klerk decided to admit non-White members, however, a substantial number of members of the House of Representatives who had been members of Labour crossed the floor to join the Nationalists. In 1992, a group of 36 such former Labour members led by Jac Rabie engineered a vote of no confidence in Hendrickse's Labour government. Losing influence at the polls, Hendrickse concluded that the Labour Party had fulfilled its uses, and the party was disbanded in 1994, with Hendrickse and his followers joining the African National Congress.

The name of the New Labour Party of Peter Marais was meant to evoke Hendrickse's Labour Party. It is not to be confused with the earlier South African Labour Party, which had represented White industrial workers.

== Electoral history ==
=== Coloured Persons' Representative Council elections ===
Election	Party leader	Seats	+/–	Position
1969	Allan Hendrickse	26 / 60	▲26	▲2nd
1975	Allan Hendrickse	35 / 60	▲9	▲1st

==== Notes ====
In 1984 the House of Representatives was created as part of the Tricameral Parliament and replaced the Coloured Persons' Representative Council

=== House of Representatives elections ===
Election	Party leader	Votes	%	Seats	+/–	Position
1984	Allan Hendrickse	200,791	74.5%	76 / 80	▲76	▲1st
1989	Allan Hendrickse	171,930	65.0%	74 / 85	▼2	1st
