= House of Representatives (South Africa) =

Coloured parliamentary house (1984–1994)

House of Representatives Raad van Verteënwoordigers

Type
- Type: Coloured representative house

History
- Established: 1984
- Disbanded: 1994
- Preceded by: Coloured Persons' Representative Council
- Succeeded by: National Assembly

Elections
- Voting system: First-past-the-post
- Last election: 6 September 1989

Meeting place
- Houses of Parliament; Cape Town; Cape Province, South Africa

The House of Representatives (Afrikaans: Raad van Verteënwoordigers) was an 80-seat body in the Tricameral Parliament of South Africa which existed from 1984–1994. It was reserved for Coloured South Africans. The body was elected twice; in 1984 and 1989. Electoral turnouts for the House of Representatives were poor.

The House of Representatives met in the former Senate chamber in the Houses of Parliament, Cape Town. The executive arm of the House of Representatives was a Ministers' Council, led by a chairman. The civil service that dealt with Coloured "own affairs" (including education, health and welfare, local government, housing and agriculture) was called the Administration: House of Representatives, and was based in Cape Town.

== Results ==
In 1984, the House was dominated by the Labour Party, which won 76 of the 80 seats.

In 1989, the Labour Party lost support but still maintained a majority of seats with 69. Other parties represented included the Democratic Reform Party, United Democratic Party, Freedom Party and 2 independents. The 1989 house was almost entirely dominated by men, with only one woman elected.

Election	Date	Total seats	Labour Party	Others	Indep.
1984 election	22 August 1984	80	76	3	1
1989 election	6 September 1989	80	69	9	2

== Chairman of the Ministers' Council ==
- Allan Hendrickse (September 1984 – 3 February 1992)
- Jac Rabie (3 February 1992 – March 1994)
