= Tricameral Parliament =

1984–1994 legislature of South Africa

Parliament of the Republic of South Africa

Type
- Type: Tricameral
- Houses: House of Assembly (representation of "Whites"); House of Representatives (representation of "Coloureds"); House of Delegates (representation of "Indians")

History
- Established: 1984
- Disbanded: 1994
- Preceded by: Parliament of South Africa
- Succeeded by: Parliament of South Africa

Elections
- Voting system: First-past-the-post
- Last election: 6 September 1989

Meeting place
- Houses of Parliament; Cape Town; Cape Province, South Africa

The Tricameral Parliament, officially the Parliament of the Republic of South Africa, was the legislature of South Africa between 1984 and 1994, established by the South African Constitution of 1983, which gave a limited political voice to the country's Coloured and Indian population groups. The majority African population group was however still excluded, their interests notionally represented in the governments of the black homelands, or "bantustans", of which they were formally citizens. As the bantustans were largely politically impotent, its principal effect was to further entrench the political power of the White section of the South African population (or, more specifically, that of the ruling National Party (NP), which in turn mainly drew its support from the Afrikaner community).

== History ==
The Tricameral Parliament can trace its origin back to 1981, when the Senate was replaced with the President's Council (Afrikaans: Presidentsraad), which was an advisory body consisting of sixty nominated members from the White, Coloured, Indian, and Chinese population groups.

Following a request by Prime Minister P.W. Botha, the President's Council presented a set of proposals in 1982 for constitutional and political reform. This proposal called for the implementation of "power sharing" between the White, Coloured, and Indian communities. The right wing of the NP was very unhappy about this proposal, and a group of its MPs, led by Dr. Andries Treurnicht, a cabinet minister and the leader of the NP in the Transvaal province, broke away to form the Conservative Party (CP) to fight for a return to apartheid in its original form.

However, Botha continued to be in favour of implementing the President's Council proposal, and, in 1983, the NP government introduced a new constitutional framework.

=== Referendum ===
To approve the proposed constitution, a referendum among White voters was held on 2 November 1983. Both the Progressive Federal Party (PFP), which objected to the exclusion of Blacks, as well as the CP, which objected to the participation of Coloureds and Indians, campaigned for a "No" vote. The conservative opposition to the reforms used banners with the text "Rhodesia voted yes – vote no!", reflecting on the transition to majority rule in Rhodesia.

However, many PFP followers and parts of the anti-government English-language press supported the new constitution as "a step in the right direction". Consequently, the "Yes" vote won the referendum with 66.3% of the ballots cast. The proposed constitution was consequently enacted by parliament as the Republic of South Africa Constitution Act of 1983.

=== Opposition ===
The general election for the House of Representatives and House of Delegates in August 1984 ran into heavy opposition. The United Democratic Front (UDF) was formed by a number of (mainly pro-African National Congress) community organisations and trade unions to oppose and boycott these elections. Nevertheless, although the election boycott was widely supported, the new constitution did come into effect, and the general election was held.

The Indian and Coloured chambers of the Tricameral Parliament suffered from a crisis of credibility, with election boycotts leading to notoriously low turnouts (the 1984 elections achieved only a 16.2% turnout). Elected officials in these houses were sometimes scorned for participating in the apartheid system. In 1987, Frederik van Zyl Slabbert, the leader of the opposition in the White chamber, quit parliamentary politics, as he saw it as increasingly irrelevant to South Africa's political future.

== Structure ==
=== Chambers ===
The parliament had three separately elected chambers:

- A 178-member (White) House of Assembly (Afrikaans: Volksraad), which was in effect the existing single-chamber Parliament.
- An 85-member (Coloured) House of Representatives (Afrikaans: Raad van Verteënwoordigers)
- A 45-member (Indian) House of Delegates (Afrikaans: Raad van Afgevaardigdes).

Under the original proposals, the White chamber was to be known as the "Assembly", while the Indian chamber was to be known as the "Chamber of Deputies". The Senate was abolished with effect from 1981.

Each of these three chambers had power over the "own affairs" (as it was termed) of the population group it represented, such as education, social welfare, housing, local government, arts, culture and recreation.

"General affairs", such as defence, finance, foreign policy, justice, law and order, transport, commerce and industry, manpower, internal affairs, and agriculture required approval from all three chambers, after consideration by joint standing committees.

=== Leadership ===
The government was led by a State President. The office of Prime Minister was abolished, and its powers were de facto transferred to the State President, which was made an executive post with very broad executive powers. He was to be selected from among the members of the Tricameral Parliament by an 88-member electoral college composed of 50 Whites, 25 Coloureds and 13 Indians, each group chosen by its respective house in parliament, and held office for the parliament's duration—in practice, five years. The State President appointed a Cabinet of ministers who would be in charge of "general affairs" as well as Ministers' Councils for each of the three parliamentary chambers to manage their "own affairs".

Cases of disagreements between the three houses of Parliament on specific legislation would be resolved by the President's Council. It consisted of 60 members—20 members appointed by the House of Assembly, 10 by the House of Representatives, five by the House of Delegates and 25 directly by the State President.

Although ostensibly based on population figures, the numerical composition of the electoral college and the President's Council meant that the white chamber could not be outvoted on any substantive issue. Thus, the real power remained in white hands—and in practice, in the hands of Botha's National Party, which had a large majority in the white chamber. For all intents and purposes, Botha held nearly all governing power in the nation.

The constitution made no provision for the representation of Black South Africans. Botha's government stripped blacks of their South African citizenship and legally considered them citizens of the homelands, in which they were expected to exercise their political rights.

=== Location ===
The House of Assembly met in the Assembly chamber at the Houses of Parliament in Cape Town. The House of Representatives met in the former Senate chamber. The House of Delegates met in a new building across the road from the Houses of Parliament which also housed a chamber for joint sittings of the three houses of the Tricameral Parliament.

== Dissolution ==
In 1994, ten years after the Tricameral Parliament was formed, one of the last pieces of legislation it passed was the Interim Constitution of 1993, which paved the way for the first non-racial elections that were held on 27 April of that year.

== See also ==
- Politics of South Africa
- Tricameralism
- United Nations Security Council Resolution 554
