= Springs (House of Assembly of South Africa constituency) =

- Former constituency for the South African House of Assembly
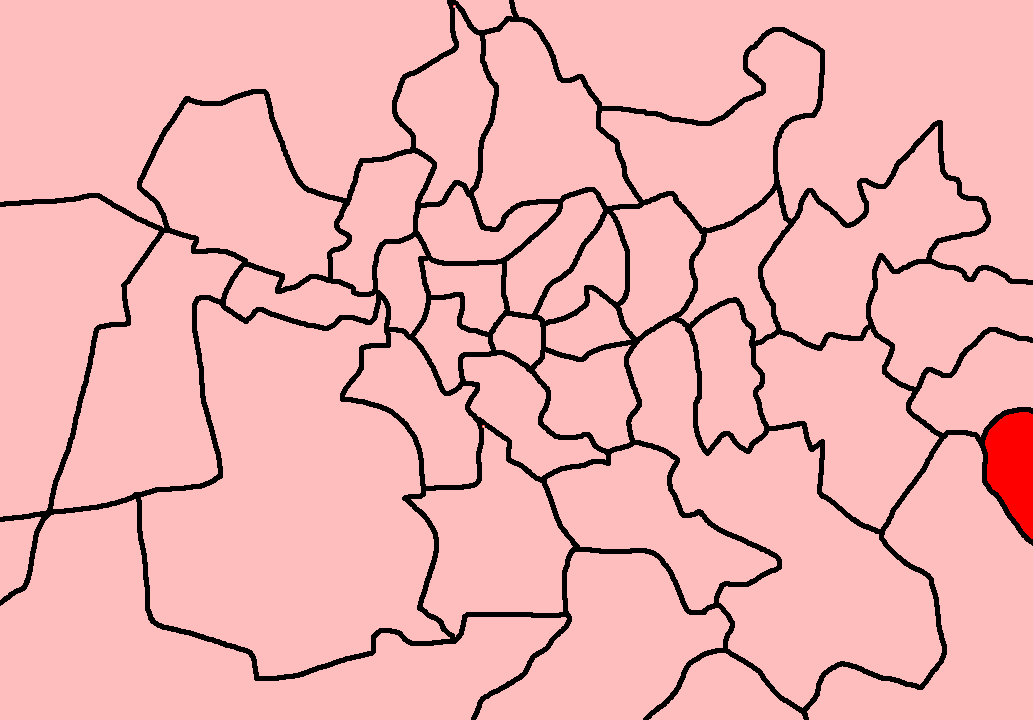
- Location of Springs within the Witwatersrand (1981)
- Province: Transvaal
- Electorate: 19,634 (1989)

Former constituency
- Created: 1910
- Abolished: 1994
- Number of members: 1
- Last MHA: P. W. Coetzer (NP)
- Replaced by: Gauteng

Springs was a constituency in the Transvaal Province of South Africa, which existed from 1915 to 1994. It covered a part of the East Rand centred on the town of Springs. Throughout its existence it elected one member to the House of Assembly and one to the Transvaal Provincial Council.

== Franchise notes ==
When the Union of South Africa was formed in 1910, the electoral qualifications in use in each pre-existing colony were kept in place. In the Transvaal Colony, and its predecessor the South African Republic, the vote was restricted to white men, and as such, elections in the Transvaal Province were held on a whites-only franchise from the beginning. The franchise was also restricted by property and education qualifications until the 1933 general election, following the passage of the Women's Enfranchisement Act, 1930 and the Franchise Laws Amendment Act, 1931. From then on, the franchise was given to all white citizens aged 21 or over. Non-whites remained disenfranchised until the end of apartheid and the introduction of universal suffrage in 1994.

== History ==
The mines of the Witwatersrand were an early stronghold of South African trade unionism, and this made Springs fertile ground for the Labour Party - though not quite as safe as nearby seats like Benoni or Jeppes. First won by Labour at its inaugural election in 1910 (with Walter Madeley, who moved to neighbouring Benoni on that seat's creation in 1915), it went on to change hands at every election until 1929, at which point it was won by the South African Party - they and their successor, the United Party, would hold it until 1966.

Springs was held by the governing National Party from 1966 until the end of apartheid, but was never quite a safe seat - the United Party remained a strong opposition in the constituency until their dissolution in 1977, and in the 1980s the hard-right Conservative Party made inroads, though unlike some other working-class Rand seats, they were never able to overcome the NP hold.

== Members ==
Election	Member	Party
1910	Walter Madeley	Labour
1915	George Rennie	Unionist
1920	George Hills	Labour
1921	F. J. van Aardt	South African
1924	John Allen	Labour
1929	R. N. Kotzé	South African
1933	R. N. Kotzé	South African
1934	R. N. Kotzé	United
1938	G. J. Sutter	United
1943	G. J. Sutter	United
1948	G. J. Sutter	United
1953	G. J. Sutter	United
1958	Henry Tucker	United
1961	L. B. Taurog	United
1966	W. S. J. Grobler	National
1970	W. S. J. Grobler	National
1974	W. S. J. Grobler	National
1977	G. T. Geldenhuys	National
1981	G. T. Geldenhuys	National
1985 by	P. W. Coetzer	National
1987	P. W. Coetzer	National
1989	P. W. Coetzer	National
1994	Constituency abolished	

== Detailed results ==
=== Elections in the 1910s ===
General election 1910: Springs
Party	Candidate	Votes	%	±%
Labour	Walter Madeley	872	52.2	New
Unionist	A. G. Barlow	799	47.8	New
Majority		73	4.4	N/A
Labour win (new seat)				

General election 1915: Springs
Party	Candidate	Votes	%	±%
Unionist	George Rennie	987	48.3	+0.5
Labour	D. M. Kendall	809	39.6	−12.6
National	J. H. Munnik	249	12.2	New
Majority		178	8.7	N/A
Turnout		2,045	68.6	N/A
Unionist win (new seat)				

=== Elections in the 1920s ===
General election 1920: Springs
Party	Candidate	Votes	%	±%
Labour	George Hills	1,100	53.6	+14.0
South African	A. M. Miller	599	29.2	New
National	A. M. van Belkum	353	17.2	+5.0
Majority		501	24.4	N/A
Turnout		2,045	68.6	N/A
Labour gain from Unionist		Swing	N/A	

General election 1921: Springs
Party	Candidate	Votes	%	±%
South African	F. J. van Aardt	983	44.8	+15.6
Labour	George Hills	827	37.7	−15.9
National	W. J. van Zyl	384	17.5	+0.3
Majority		156	7.1	N/A
Turnout		2,194	65.3	−3.3
South African gain from Labour		Swing	+15.8	

General election 1924: Springs
Party	Candidate	Votes	%	±%
Labour	John Allen	1,179	56.6	+18.9
South African	C. E. Dearlove	899	43.1	−1.7
Rejected ballots		7	0.3	N/A
Majority		280	13.5	N/A
Turnout		2,085	76.5	+11.2
Labour gain from South African		Swing	+10.3	

General election 1929: Springs
Party	Candidate	Votes	%	±%
South African	R. N. Kotzé	1,218	53.2	+10.1
Independent	J. Mackay	1,064	46.4	New
Rejected ballots		9	0.4	+0.1
Majority		154	6.8	N/A
Turnout		2,291	82.2	+5.7
South African gain from Labour		Swing	N/A	

=== Elections in the 1930s ===
General election 1933: Springs
Party	Candidate	Votes	%	±%
South African	R. N. Kotzé	2,619	62.6	+9.4
Roos	C. F. W. Lippiatt	1,531	36.6	New
Rejected ballots		37	0.8	+0.4
Majority		1,088	26.0	N/A
Turnout		4,187	69.8	−12.4
South African hold		Swing	N/A	

General election 1938: Springs
Party	Candidate	Votes	%	±%
United	G. J. Sutter	4,276	63.9	+1.3
Labour	P. J. Baird	2,363	35.3	New
Rejected ballots		53	0.8	+-0
Majority		1,913	28.6	N/A
Turnout		6,692	70.2	+0.4
United hold		Swing	N/A	
