= Boksburg (House of Assembly of South Africa constituency) =

- Former constituency for the South African House of Assembly
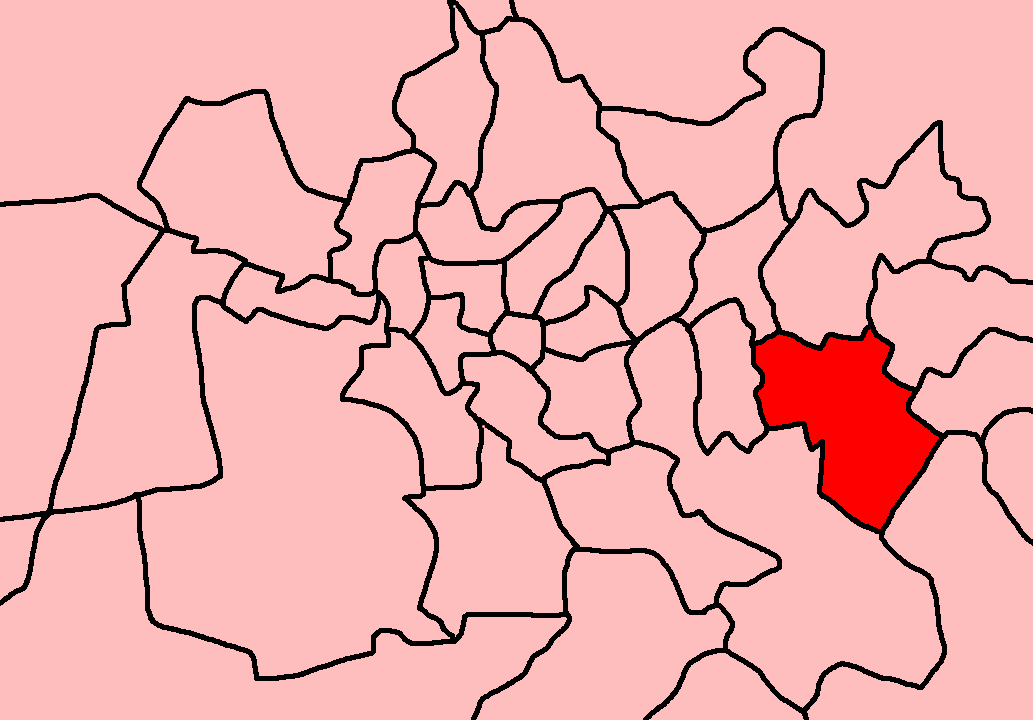
- Location of Boksburg within the Witwatersrand (1981)
- Province: Transvaal
- Electorate: 23,177 (1989)

Former constituency
- Created: 1910
- Abolished: 1994
- Number of members: 1
- Last MHA: Sakkie Blanché (NP)
- Replaced by: Gauteng

Boksburg was a constituency in the Transvaal Province of South Africa, which existed from 1915 to 1994. It covered a part of the East Rand centred on the town of Boksburg. Throughout its existence it elected one member to the House of Assembly and one to the Transvaal Provincial Council.

== Franchise notes ==
When the Union of South Africa was formed in 1910, the electoral qualifications in use in each pre-existing colony were kept in place. In the Transvaal Colony, and its predecessor the South African Republic, the vote was restricted to white men, and as such, elections in the Transvaal Province were held on a whites-only franchise from the beginning. The franchise was also restricted by property and education qualifications until the 1933 general election, following the passage of the Women's Enfranchisement Act, 1930 and the Franchise Laws Amendment Act, 1931. From then on, the franchise was given to all white citizens aged 21 or over. Non-whites remained disenfranchised until the end of apartheid and the introduction of universal suffrage in 1994.

== History ==
The mines of the Witwatersrand were an early stronghold of South African trade unionism, and this made Boksburg fertile ground for the Labour Party - though not quite as safe as neighbouring seats like Benoni or Jeppes. It was held by the party during its nationwide peaks in 1920 and 1924-29, and otherwise alternated between the major parties. It was held by the Unionists in the 1910s, the South African Party in 1921, and in 1933, it was one of two seats won by Tielman Roos' "Central Party". From 1938 to 1958, it was a United Party seat, and in 1958 it fell to the governing National Party, who would hold it until the end of apartheid. Its last MP, Sakkie Blanché, was first elected in 1978, and continued to be a fixture of conservative politics in the post-apartheid era, only retiring in 2009.

== Members ==
Election	Member	Party
1910	J. C. MacNeillie	Unionist
1915	J. C. MacNeillie	Unionist
1920	J. J. McMenamin	Labour
1921	Robert Hugh Henderson	South African
1924	J. J. McMenamin	Labour
1929	J. J. McMenamin	Labour
1933	G. S. Bouwer	Roos
1938	L. B. Klopper	United
1943	H. J. Williams	United
1948	H. J. Williams	United
1953	H. J. Williams	United
1958	G. L. H. van Niekerk	National
1961	G. L. H. van Niekerk	National
1966	J. P. A. Reyneke	National
1970	J. P. A. Reyneke	National
1974	J. P. A. Reyneke	National
1977	J. P. A. Reyneke	National
1978 by	Sakkie Blanché	National
1981	Sakkie Blanché	National
1987	Sakkie Blanché	National
1989	Sakkie Blanché	National
1994	Constituency abolished	

== Detailed results ==
=== Elections in the 1910s ===
General election 1910: Boksburg
Party	Candidate	Votes	%	±%
Unionist	J. C. MacNeillie	1,109	62.0	New
Het Volk	C. B. Mussared	680	38.0	New
Majority		429	24.0	N/A
Unionist win (new seat)				

General election 1915: Boksburg
Party	Candidate	Votes	%	±%
Unionist	J. C. MacNeillie	959	61.1	−0.9
Labour	A. Ruffels	611	38.9	New
Majority		348	22.2	N/A
Turnout		1,570	76.4	N/A
Unionist hold		Swing	N/A	

=== Elections in the 1920s ===
General election 1920: Boksburg
Party	Candidate	Votes	%	±%
Labour	J. J. McMenamin	843	40.2	+1.3
Unionist	J. J. Byron	824	39.3	−21.8
National	P. J. Baird	428	20.4	New
Majority		19	0.9	N/A
Turnout		2,095	64.5	−11.9
Labour gain from Unionist		Swing	+10.2	

General election 1921: Boksburg
Party	Candidate	Votes	%	±%
South African	Robert Hugh Henderson	1,059	50.0	New
Labour	J. J. McMenamin	686	32.4	−7.8
National	P. F. Anderson	374	17.7	−2.7
Majority		373	17.6	N/A
Turnout		2,119	63.7	−0.8
South African gain from Labour		Swing	N/A	

General election 1924: Boksburg
Party	Candidate	Votes	%	±%
Labour	J. J. McMenamin	1,111	51.5	+19.1
South African	Robert Hugh Henderson	1,042	48.3	−1.7
Rejected ballots		6	17.6	N/A
Majority		69	3.2	N/A
Turnout		2,159	82.6	+8.9
Labour gain from South African		Swing	+10.4	

General election 1929: Boksburg
Party	Candidate	Votes	%	±%
Labour (Creswell)	J. J. McMenamin	1,453	52.5	+1.0
South African	E. Goodman	1,259	45.5	−2.8
Labour (N.C.)	D. B. Davies	44	1.6	New
Rejected ballots		14	0.4	+0.1
Majority		194	7.0	+3.8
Turnout		2,770	80.7	−1.9
Labour hold		Swing	+1.9	

=== Elections in the 1930s ===
General election 1933: Boksburg
Party	Candidate	Votes	%	±%
Roos	G. S. Bouwer	1,421	31.9	New
Labour (Creswell)	J. J. McMenamin	1,286	28.9	−23.6
Labour (N.C.)	T. Stark	1,141	25.6	+24.0
Independent	J. E. Bigwood	589	13.2	New
Rejected ballots		19	0.4	+-0
Majority		135	3.0	N/A
Turnout		4,456	74.0	−6.7
Roos gain from Labour		Swing	N/A	

General election 1938: Boksburg
Party	Candidate	Votes	%	±%
United	L. B. Klopper	2,974	49.0	New
Labour	P. A. Venter	1,309	21.6	−7.3
Purified National	F. B. van K. Crots	1,276	21.0	New
Dominion	A. F. Green	487	8.0	New
Rejected ballots		20	0.4	+-0
Majority		1,665	27.4	N/A
Turnout		6,066	79.1	+5.1
United gain from Roos		Swing	N/A	
