= Umbilo (House of Assembly of South Africa constituency) =

Former constituency of South Africa

- Former constituency for the South African House of Assembly
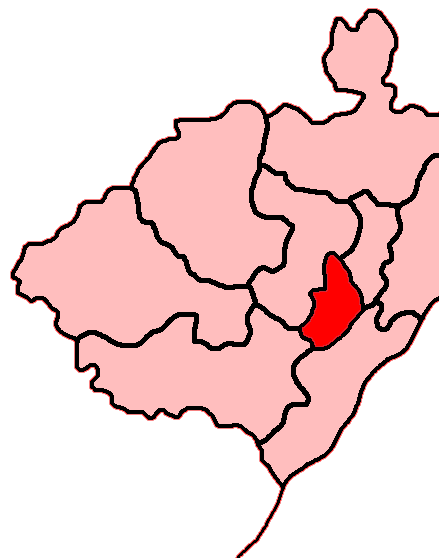
- Location of Umbilo within Durban (1981)
- Province: Natal
- Electorate: 16,789 (1989)

Former constituency
- Created: 1910
- Abolished: 1994
- Number of members: 1
- Last MHA: C. H. Charlewood (DP)
- Replaced by: KwaZulu-Natal

Umbilo, known as Durban Umbilo (Afrikaans: Durban-Umbilo) until 1966, was a constituency in the Natal Province of South Africa, which existed from 1910 to 1994. Named for the Umbilo River, it covered the inner-southern suburbs of Durban surrounding the docks. Throughout its existence it elected one member to the House of Assembly.

== Franchise notes ==
When the Union of South Africa was formed in 1910, the electoral qualifications in use in each pre-existing colony were kept in place. The franchise used in the Natal Colony, while theoretically not restricted by race, was significantly less liberal than that of the Cape, and no more than a few hundred non-white electors ever qualified. In 1908, an estimated 200 of the 22,786 electors in the colony were of non-European descent, and by 1935, only one remained. By 1958, when the last non-white voters in the Cape were taken off the rolls, Natal too had an all-white electorate. The franchise was also restricted by property and education qualifications until the 1933 general election, following the passage of the Women's Enfranchisement Act, 1930 and the Franchise Laws Amendment Act, 1931. From then on, the franchise was given to all white citizens aged 21 or over, which remained the case until the end of apartheid and the introduction of universal suffrage in 1994.

== History ==
The Port of Durban was one of the two major strongholds of early South African trade unionism (along with the Witwatersrand mines), and this made Umbilo a prominent safe seat for the Labour Party. Its first two elections were won by Unionist-turned-independent Charles Phineas Robinson, who would go on to represent two other Durban seats before retiring from parliament in 1938. Through the 1920s, Umbilo changed hands at every election between Labour and the South African Party, but from 1933 until 1958, it was held continuously by various stripes of leftist. Unlike many safe seats, however, it saw a rapid succession of individual MPs, with no Labour MP holding the seat for more than a single full term. In 1953, it was one of only five seats nationwide held by Labour, alongside neighbouring Umlazi and three seats on the Witwatersrand.

After the 1953 election, the Labour Party went into fatal decline, and in 1958, the United Party's Geoffrey Norman Oldfield took the seat without opposition. In marked contrast to his Labour predecessors, Oldfield would represent Umbilo without interruption for 23 years, joining the conservative New Republic Party after the UP dissolved in 1977. By this time, the voting patterns of the white working class in South Africa had changed considerably, and the NRP held the seat on Oldfield's retirement in 1981, giving way in 1987 to Piet Matthee of the governing National Party. Unlike similar constituencies in Cape Town or Johannesburg, however, Umbilo would not become a safe seat for the NP, and in 1989 they lost the seat to the liberal Democratic Party. The DP's Carole Heeley Charlewood would become the seat's final MP, representing it until the first post-apartheid elections in 1994.

== Members ==
Election	Member	Party
1910	C. P. Robinson	Unionist
1915	C. P. Robinson	Independent
1920	Frank Nettleton	Labour
1921	H. G. Mackeurtan	South African
1924	George Reyburn	Labour
1929	H. P. Borlase	South African
1933	R. T. McArthur	Labour
1933 by	D. C. Burnside	Labour
1938	D. C. Burnside	Socialist
1943	A. T. Wanless	Labour
1948	E. A. Benson	Labour
1953	Leonard Whiteley	Labour
1958	G. N. Oldfield	United
1961	G. N. Oldfield	United
1966	G. N. Oldfield	United
1970	G. N. Oldfield	United
1974	G. N. Oldfield	United
1977	G. N. Oldfield	New Republic
1981	D. W. Watterson	New Republic
1987	Piet Matthee	National
1989	C. H. Charlewood	Democratic
1994	Constituency abolished	

== Detailed results ==
=== Elections in the 1910s ===
General election 1910: Durban Umbilo
Party	Candidate	Votes	%	±%
Unionist	C. P. Robinson	788	58.7	New
Labour	F. T. Powrie	554	41.3	New
Majority		234	17.4	N/A
Unionist win (new seat)				

General election 1915: Durban Umbilo
Party	Candidate	Votes	%	±%
Unionist	C. P. Robinson	969	62.1	+3.4
Labour	N. P. Palmer	592	37.9	−3.4
Majority		377	24.2	+6.8
Turnout		1,561	68.3	N/A
Unionist hold		Swing	+3.4	

=== Elections in the 1920s ===
General election 1920: Durban Umbilo
Party	Candidate	Votes	%	±%
Labour	Frank Nettleton	901	62.7	+24.8
Unionist	C. P. Robinson	535	37.3	−24.8
Majority		366	25.2	N/A
Turnout		1,436	65.2	−3.1
Labour gain from Unionist		Swing	+24.8	

General election 1921: Durban Umbilo
Party	Candidate	Votes	%	±%
South African	H. G. MacKeurtan	1,008	57.1	New
Labour	Frank Nettleton	758	42.9	−19.8
Majority		250	14.2	N/A
Turnout		1,766	69.4	+4.2
South African gain from Labour		Swing	N/A	

General election 1924: Durban Umbilo
Party	Candidate	Votes	%	±%
Labour	George Reyburn	1,022	50.9	+8.0
South African	E. F. Hoare	972	48.4	−8.7
Rejected ballots		13	0.7	N/A
Majority		50	2.5	N/A
Turnout		2,007	85.8	+16.4
Labour gain from South African		Swing	+8.4	

General election 1929: Durban Umbilo
Party	Candidate	Votes	%	±%
South African	H. P. Borlase	1,429	61.4	+13.0
Labour (N.C.)	George Reyburn	884	38.0	−12.9
Rejected ballots		13	0.6	-0.1
Majority		545	23.4	N/A
Turnout		2,326	75.5	−10.3
South African gain from Labour		Swing	+13.0	

=== Elections in the 1930s ===
General election 1933: Durban Umbilo
Party	Candidate	Votes	%	±%
Labour (N.C.)	R. T. McArthur	2,960	68.2	+30.2
South African	J. R. Walker	1,349	31.1	−30.3
Rejected ballots		33	0.7	+0.1
Majority		1,611	37.1	N/A
Turnout		4,342	70.4	−5.1
Labour gain from South African		Swing	+30.3	

Durban Umbilo by-election, 22 November 1933
Party	Candidate	Votes	%	±%
Labour	D. C. Burnside	1,459	41.9	−26.3
South African	H. P. Borlase	1,282	36.8	+5.7
Independent	E. Ashburner	678	19.5	New
Independent	H. H. S. Dold	53	1.5	New
Rejected ballots		12	0.3	-0.4
Majority		177	5.1	−32.0
Turnout		3,484	62.3	−8.1
Labour hold		Swing	-16.0	

General election 1938: Durban Umbilo
Party	Candidate	Votes	%	±%
Socialist	D. C. Burnside	2,441	44.0	New
Dominion	C. F. Johnstone	2,219	40.0	New
United	A. H. Mitchell	761	13.7	−17.6
Independent	R. MacKensie	96	1.7	New
Rejected ballots		32	0.6	-0.1
Majority		222	4.0	N/A
Turnout		5,549	76.0	+5.6
Socialist Party gain from Labour		Swing	N/A	
