= Roodepoort (House of Assembly of South Africa constituency) =

- Former constituency for the South African House of Assembly
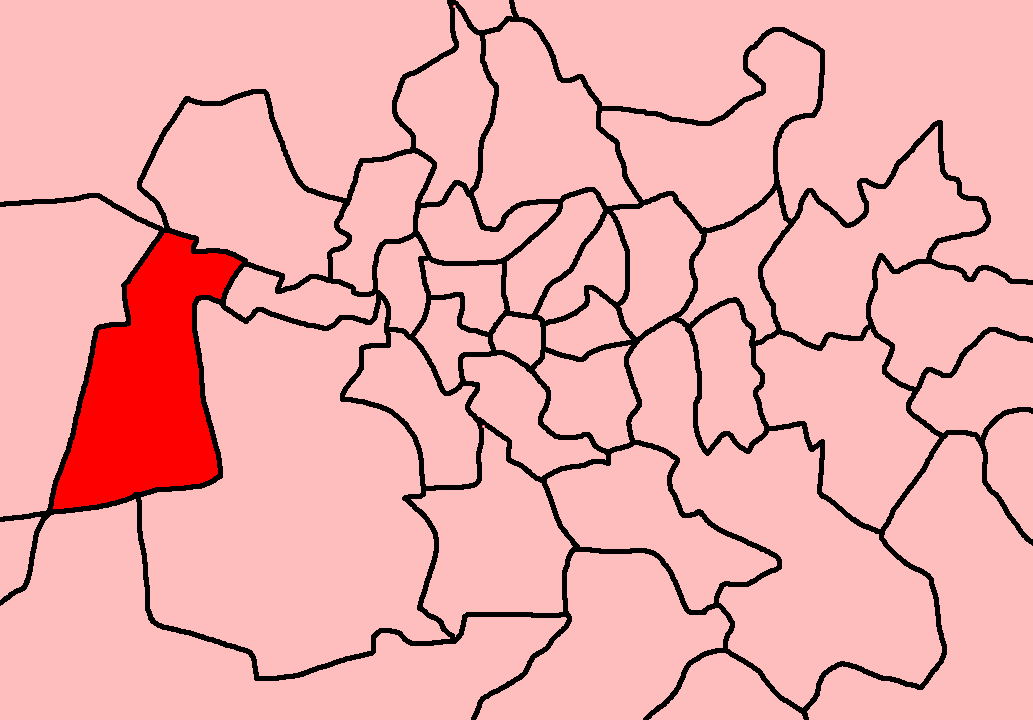
- Location of Roodepoort within the Witwatersrand (1981)
- Province: Transvaal
- Electorate: 22,326 (1989)

Former constituency
- Created: 1920
- Abolished: 1994
- Number of members: 1
- Last MHA: J. J. S. Prinsloo (CP)
- Replaced by: Gauteng

Roodepoort was a constituency in the Transvaal Province of South Africa, which existed for the inaugural Union election in 1910, and again from 1920 to 1994. It covered an area of the West Rand centred on the town of Roodepoort (now part of Johannesburg). Throughout its existence it elected one member to the House of Assembly and one to the Transvaal Provincial Council.

== Franchise notes ==
When the Union of South Africa was formed in 1910, the electoral qualifications in use in each pre-existing colony were kept in place. In the Transvaal Colony, and its predecessor the South African Republic, the vote was restricted to white men, and as such, elections in the Transvaal Province were held on a whites-only franchise from the beginning. The franchise was also restricted by property and education qualifications until the 1933 general election, following the passage of the Women's Enfranchisement Act, 1930 and the Franchise Laws Amendment Act, 1931. From then on, the franchise was given to all white citizens aged 21 or over. Non-whites remained disenfranchised until the end of apartheid and the introduction of universal suffrage in 1994.

== History ==
The mines of the Witwatersrand were an early stronghold of South African trade unionism, and this made Roodepoort fertile ground for the Labour Party. At its first election, it was won by an Independent Labour candidate, Charles Henry Haggar, who narrowly defeated a Unionist candidate and held the seat until its abolition at the 1915 delimitation.

Roodepoort's absence from the electoral map wouldn't be long-lived, however, and the seat returned in 1920, once again as a Labour safe seat. Its new MP, Reverend John Mullineux, was elected comfortably over a divided opposition in 1920, and held the seat by good margins in 1921 and 1924. In 1929, with the Labour Party in civil war over whether to continue supporting the J. B. M. Hertzog-led coalition government, Mullineux stood down and the seat was won by Charles Stallard of the South African Party. Stallard was one of a handful of English-speaking SAP politicians to reject the party's merger into the United Party, forming the Dominion Party to advocate for his pro-British beliefs. The Dominion Party quickly became a Natal-centric party, but Stallard stood for re-election in Roodepoort in 1938, losing to the UP candidate by a smaller margin than any other Dominion candidate in the Transvaal.

Over time, like many other working-class seats on the Rand, Roodepoort became a safe seat for the governing National Party. Its longest-serving MP, Michiel Coenraad Botha, served in cabinet under John Vorster and retired in 1977. His successor, Willem Jacobus Cuyler, went unopposed in 1981, but this doesn't seem to have indicated lasting support for the governing party in the constituency, because in 1987 he lost it to the rising Conservative Party. Roodepoort was one of only three seats in major urban areas (along with Brakpan and Pretoria West) to vote for that party, and they held it until the end of apartheid.

== Members ==
Election	Member	Party
1910	C. H. Haggar	Independent Labour
1915	Constituency abolished	

Election	Member	Party
1920	John Mullineux	Labour
1921	John Mullineux	Labour
1924	John Mullineux	Labour
1929	Charles Stallard	South African
1933	Charles Stallard	South African
1934	Charles Stallard	Dominion
1938	F. B. Allen	United
1943	F. B. Allen	United
1948	F. B. Allen	United
1953	M. C. Botha	National
1958	M. C. Botha	National
1961	M. C. Botha	National
1966	M. C. Botha	National
1970	M. C. Botha	National
1974	M. C. Botha	National
1977	W. J. Cuyler	National
1981	W. J. Cuyler	National
1987	J. J. S. Prinsloo	Conservative
1989	J. J. S. Prinsloo	Conservative
1994	Constituency abolished	

== Detailed results ==
=== Elections in the 1910s ===
General election 1910: Roodepoort
Party	Candidate	Votes	%	±%
Independent Labour	C. H. Haggar	815	50.8	New
Unionist	H. W. Soutter	789	49.2	New
Majority		26	1.6	N/A
Independent Labour win (new seat)				

=== Elections in the 1920s ===
General election 1920: Roodepoort
Party	Candidate	Votes	%	±%
Labour	John Mullineux	1,028	50.4	New
South African	W. Adam	517	25.4	New
National	J. A. Dieperink	493	24.2	New
Majority		511	25.0	N/A
Turnout		2,038	60.0	N/A
Labour win (new seat)				

General election 1921: Roodepoort
Party	Candidate	Votes	%	±%
Labour	John Mullineux	1,074	58.1	+7.7
South African	W. P. Pistorius	775	41.9	+16.5
Majority		299	16.2	−8.8
Turnout		1,849	52.8	−7.2
Labour hold		Swing	-4.4	

General election 1924: Roodepoort
Party	Candidate	Votes	%	±%
Labour	John Mullineux	1,137	54.4	−3.7
South African	Charles Stallard	944	45.1	+3.2
Rejected ballots		8	0.5	N/A
Majority		193	9.3	−6.9
Turnout		2,089	80.2	+27.4
Labour hold		Swing	-3.5	

General election 1929: Roodepoort
Party	Candidate	Votes	%	±%
South African	Charles Stallard	1,153	49.9	+4.8
Labour (Creswell)	J. R. Oelofse	1,142	49.4	−5.0
Rejected ballots		16	0.7	+0.2
Majority		11	0.5	N/A
Turnout		2,311	80.8	+0.6
South African gain from Labour		Swing	+4.9	

=== Elections in the 1930s ===
General election 1933: Roodepoort
Party	Candidate	Votes	%	±%
South African	Charles Stallard	Unopposed		
South African hold				

General election 1938: Roodepoort
Party	Candidate	Votes	%	±%
United	F. B. Allen	2,493	38.3	New
Dominion	Charles Stallard	2,119	32.5	N/A
Purified National	A. S. van Hees	956	14.7	New
Labour	A. M. Merkel	912	14.0	New
Rejected ballots		33	0.5	N/A
Majority		374	5.7	N/A
Turnout		6,513	78.4	N/A
United gain from Dominion		Swing	N/A	
