= East London City (House of Assembly of South Africa constituency) =

- Oos-Londen-Stad
- Former constituency for the South African House of Assembly
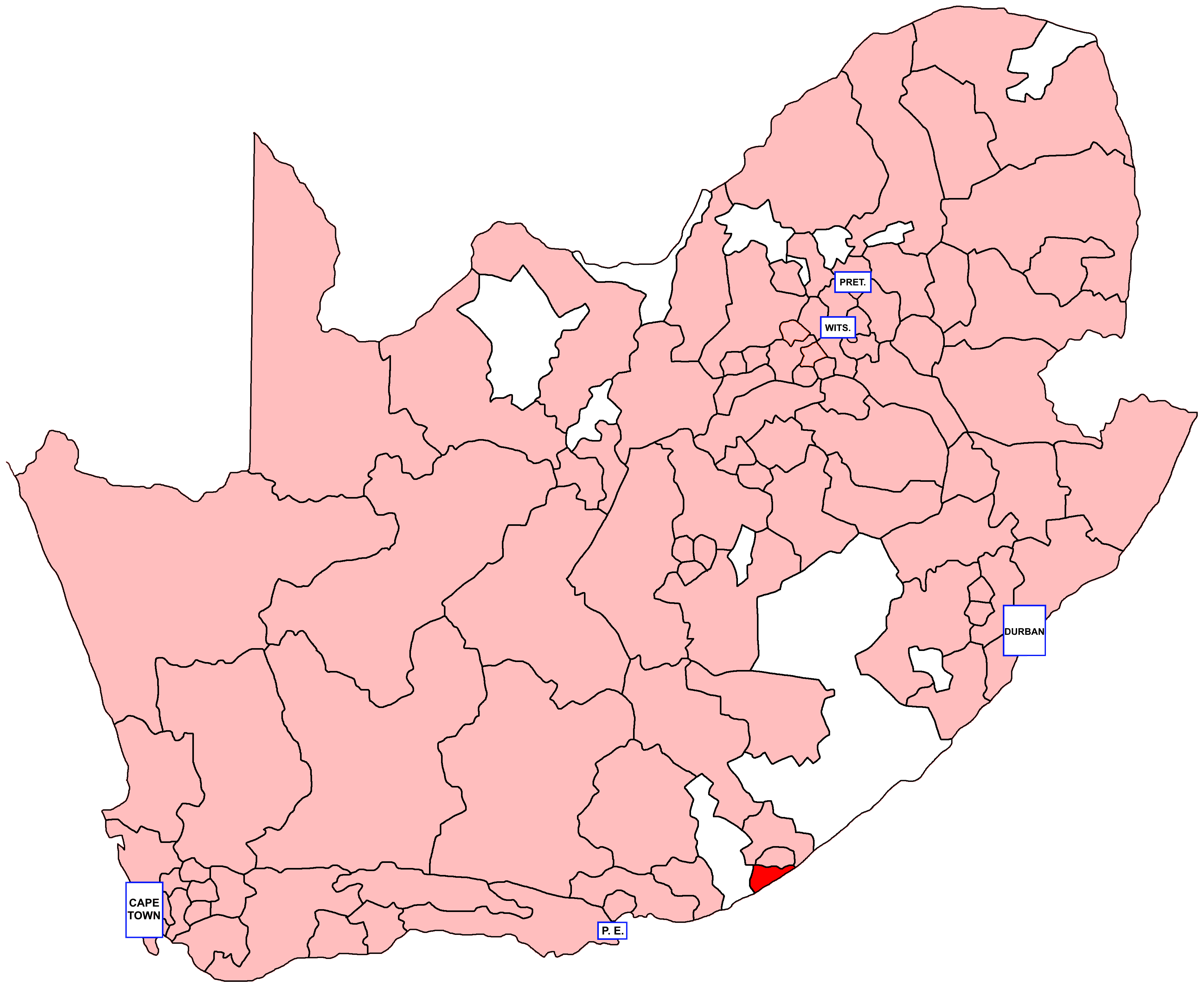
- Location of East London City within South Africa (1981)
- Province: Cape of Good Hope
- Electorate: 16,198 (1989)

Former constituency
- Created: 1910
- Abolished: 1994
- Number of members: 1
- Last MHA: W. H. Nel (NP)
- Replaced by: Eastern Cape

East London City (Afrikaans: Oos-Londen-Stad; known simply as East London (Oos-Londen) prior to 1924) was a constituency in the Cape Province of South Africa, which existed from 1910 to 1994. The seat covered the urban area of its namesake city, a major port and the second-largest city in the Eastern Cape. Throughout its existence it elected one member to the House of Assembly and one to the Cape Provincial Council.

== Franchise notes ==
When the Union of South Africa was formed in 1910, the electoral qualifications in use in each pre-existing colony were kept in place. The Cape Colony had implemented a "colour-blind" franchise known as the Cape Qualified Franchise, which included all adult literate men owning more than £75 worth of property (controversially raised from £25 in 1892), and this initially remained in effect after the colony became the Cape Province. As of 1908, 22,784 out of 152,221 electors in the Cape Colony were "Native or Coloured". Eligibility to serve in Parliament and the Provincial Council, however, was restricted to whites from 1910 onward.

The first challenge to the Cape Qualified Franchise came with the Women's Enfranchisement Act, 1930 and the Franchise Laws Amendment Act, 1931, which extended the vote to women and removed property qualifications for the white population only – non-white voters remained subject to the earlier restrictions. In 1936, the Representation of Natives Act removed all black voters from the common electoral roll and introduced three "Native Representative Members", white MPs elected by the black voters of the province and meant to represent their interests in particular. A similar provision was made for Coloured voters with the Separate Representation of Voters Act, 1951, and although this law was challenged by the courts, it went into effect in time for the 1958 general election, which was thus held with all-white voter rolls for the first time in South African history. The all-white franchise would continue until the end of apartheid and the introduction of universal suffrage in 1994.

== History ==
East London, like much of the Eastern Cape, was a stronghold of the pro-British side of South African politics and had a largely English-speaking electorate. Its first MP, Sir Charles Preston Crewe, had previously represented Aliwal North in the Cape Parliament as a Progressive, and sat for East London as a member of that party’s successor, the Unionist Party. He held the seat in 1915, despite a growing Labour vote, but the by-election caused by his resignation in 1919 was won by Labour candidate James Stewart. Stewart held the seat in 1920, the best election in the Labour Party’s history, but lost it to the South African Party (which by then had merged with the Unionists) in 1921. Stewart returned in a 1921 by-election, and fellow Labour member Andrew Latimer won the seat in 1943 against no major-party opposition, but with those exceptions, the seat now became safe for the SAP and its successor the United Party. The UP would hold the seat without interruption from 1948 until 1977, when it was captured by Gert Myburgh of the governing National Party. Myburgh stood down at the 1981 election, but East London remained an NP seat for the remainder of its existence.

== Members ==
Election	Member	Party
1910	C. P. Crewe	Unionist
1915	C. P. Crewe	Unionist
1919 by	James Stewart	Labour
1920	James Stewart	Labour
1921	C. J. Lownds	South African
1921 by	James Stewart	Labour
1924	W. W. Rider	South African
1929	J. A. Bowie	South African
1933	J. A. Bowie	South African
1934	J. A. Bowie	United
1938	J. A. Bowie	United
1943	Andrew Latimer	Labour
1948	D. L. Smit	United
1953	D. L. Smit	United
1958	D. L. Smit	United
1961	D. L. Smit	United
1961 by	J. H. Moolman	United
1966	J. H. Moolman	United
1970	J. H. Moolman	United
1974	H. G. H. Bell	United
1977	Gert Myburgh	National
1981	P. de Pontes	National
1987	P. de Pontes	National
1989	W. H. Nel	National
1994	constituency abolished	

== Detailed results ==
=== Elections in the 1910s ===
General election 1910: East London
Party	Candidate	Votes	%	±%
Unionist	C. P. Crewe	1,331	67.1	New
Independent	J. A. Goldsmith	651	32.9	New
Majority		680	34.2	N/A
Unionist win (new seat)				

General election 1915: East London
Party	Candidate	Votes	%	±%
Unionist	C. P. Crewe	1,478	47.3	−19.8
Labour	James Stewart	1,214	38.8	New
Independent	F. L. Gregg	435	13.9	New
Majority		264	8.5	N/A
Turnout		3,127	64.8	N/A
Unionist hold		Swing	N/A	

East London by-election, 19 February 1919
Party	Candidate	Votes	%	±%
Labour	James Stewart	1,221	50.4	+11.6
South African	C. J. Lownds	1,203	49.6	New
Majority		18	0.8	N/A
Turnout		2,424	55.3	−11.5
Labour gain from Unionist		Swing	N/A	

=== Elections in the 1920s ===
General election 1920: East London
Party	Candidate	Votes	%	±%
Labour	James Stewart	1,368	50.6	+11.8
Unionist	C. J. Lownds	1,338	49.4	+2.1
Majority		30	1.2	N/A
Turnout		2,706	68.3	+3.5
Labour gain from Unionist		Swing	+7.0	

General election 1921: East London
Party	Candidate	Votes	%	±%
South African	C. J. Lownds	1,493	50.7	+1.3
Labour	James Stewart	1,454	49.3	−1.3
Majority		39	1.4	N/A
Turnout		2,947	70.2	+1.9
South African gain from Labour		Swing	+1.3	

East London by-election, 19 April 1921
Party	Candidate	Votes	%	±%
Labour	James Stewart	1,506	50.9	+1.6
South African	C. J. Lownds	1,443	48.8	−1.9
Rejected ballots		11	0.3	N/A
Majority		63	2.1	N/A
Turnout		2,960	70.5	+0.3
Labour gain from South African		Swing	+1.8	

General election 1924: East London City
Party	Candidate	Votes	%	±%
South African	W. W. Rider	1,545	50.5	−0.2
Labour	James Stewart	1,451	47.5	−1.8
Rejected ballots		61	2.0	N/A
Majority		94	3.0	+1.6
Turnout		3,057	87.5	+17.3
South African hold		Swing	+0.8	

General election 1929: East London City
Party	Candidate	Votes	%	±%
South African	J. A. Bowie	1,785	54.2	+3.7
Labour (Creswell)	James Stewart	1,476	44.9	−2.6
Rejected ballots		30	0.9	-1.1
Majority		309	9.3	+6.3
Turnout		3,291	80.5	−7.0
South African hold		Swing	+3.2	

=== Elections in the 1930s ===
General election 1933: East London City
Party	Candidate	Votes	%	±%
South African	J. A. Bowie	3,141	52.2	−2.0
Independent	James Stewart	2,828	47.0	+2.1
Rejected ballots		47	0.8	-0.1
Majority		313	5.2	−4.1
Turnout		6,016	71.4	−9.1
South African hold		Swing	-2.1	

General election 1938: East London City
Party	Candidate	Votes	%	±%
United	J. A. Bowie	2,558	38.0	−14.2
Dominion	F. E. Dalby	2,381	35.3	New
Labour	P. F. Webb	1,767	26.2	New
Rejected ballots		32	0.5	-0.3
Majority		177	2.6	N/A
Turnout		6,738	79.4	+8.0
United hold		Swing	N/A	

=== Elections in the 1940s ===
General election 1943: East London City
Party	Candidate	Votes	%	±%
Labour	Andrew Latimer	4,696	68.5	+42.1
Independent	C. L. Logan	1,345	19.6	New
Independent	N. J. Smith	810	11.8	New
Majority		3,351	48.9	N/A
Turnout		6,851	67.6	−11.4
Labour gain from United		Swing	N/A	

General election 1948: East London City
Party	Candidate	Votes	%	±%
United	D. L. Smit	6,173	75.0	New
Central Group	L. B. Klopper	1,830	22.2	New
SA Party	M. C. O'Dell	225	2.8	New
Majority		4,343	52.8	N/A
Turnout		8,228	76.5	+8.9
United gain from Labour		Swing	N/A	
