= Rosettenville (House of Assembly of South Africa constituency) =

- Former constituency for the South African House of Assembly
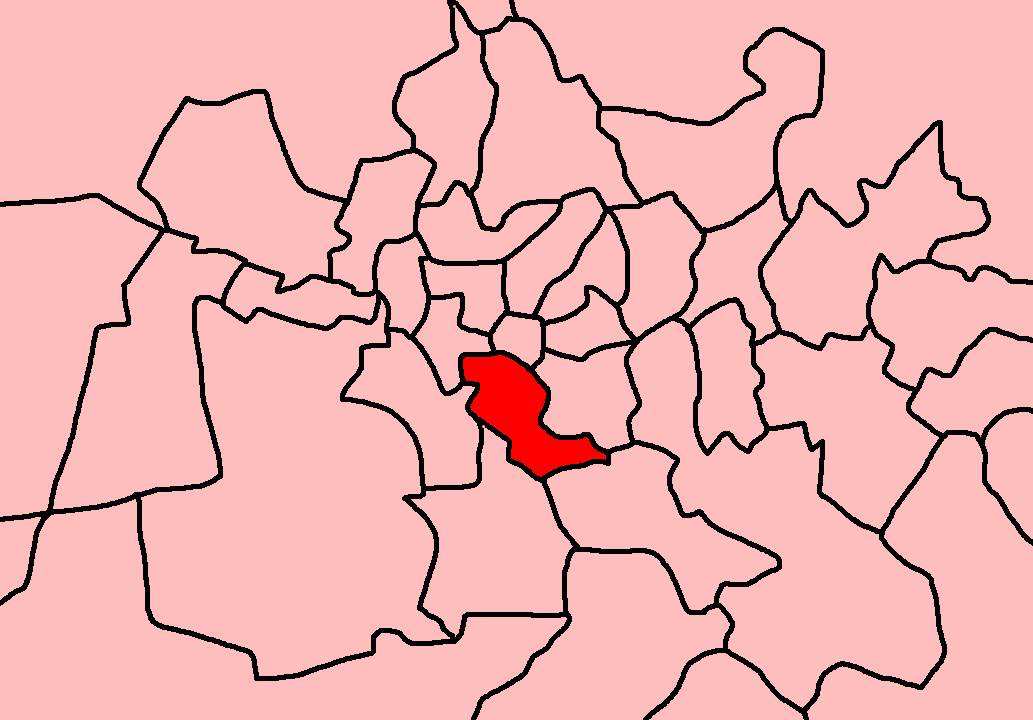
- Location of Rosettenville within the Witwatersrand (1981)
- Province: Transvaal
- Electorate: 18,988 (1989)

Former constituency
- Created: 1933
- Abolished: 1994
- Number of members: 1
- Last MHA: Sheila Camerer (NP)
- Replaced by: Gauteng

Rosettenville was a constituency in the Transvaal Province of South Africa, which existed from 1933 to 1994. It covered a part of the southern suburbs of Johannesburg centred on the suburb of Rosettenville. Throughout its existence it elected one member to the House of Assembly and one to the Transvaal Provincial Council.

== Franchise notes ==
When the Union of South Africa was formed in 1910, the electoral qualifications in use in each pre-existing colony were kept in place. In the Transvaal Colony, and its predecessor the South African Republic, the vote was restricted to white men, and as such, elections in the Transvaal Province were held on a whites-only franchise from the beginning. The franchise was also restricted by property and education qualifications until the 1933 general election, following the passage of the Women's Enfranchisement Act, 1930 and the Franchise Laws Amendment Act, 1931. From then on, the franchise was given to all white citizens aged 21 or over. Non-whites remained disenfranchised until the end of apartheid and the introduction of universal suffrage in 1994.

== History ==
Rosettenville was a socioeconomically mixed constituency that went through multiple different phases through its history. Its first MP, Emil Paul Baumann, was elected representing the South African Party, defeating a Labour candidate, and left parliament in 1936. The resulting by-election was won by John Christie, former Johannesburg mayor and future Labour Party leader, who came through a divided field with both United Party and Dominion Party candidates standing. Christie moved back to his former seat of Langlaagte in 1938, but failed to get elected there, and Rosettenville also returned to the UP fold with Frederick Theunis Howarth, who would represent the seat for the next ten years. In 1948, he left parliament, and the UP gave a free run in the seat to Labour candidate Alex Hepple, who served as Rosettenville's MP for another ten years and became leader of the Labour Party following Christie's death in 1953. Hepple was a stalwart opponent of apartheid, and tried to turn the Labour Party into an avowedly socialist, anti-racist organisation - this only succeeded in breaking the party's pact with the UP and destroying it as an electoral force, with only two Labour candidates (Hepple and Leo Lovell) even standing for election in 1958, and both losing by wide margins.

From 1958 until 1977, Rosettenville was a safe seat for the UP, but after the UP dissolved in 1977, it was won by Helgard Michal Janse van Rensburg for the governing National Party. The New Republic Party, the more conservative successor party to the UP, put up relatively strong challenges in 1977 and 1981, but in 1987 and 1989, the main opposition came from the Conservative Party. Rosettenville's final MP, Sheila Camerer, continued in politics after the end of apartheid, becoming leader of the New National Party in 1997 and serving in parliament for the Democratic Alliance until 2009.

== Members ==
Election	Member	Party
1933	E. P. Baumann	South African
1934	E. P. Baumann	United
1936 by	John Christie	Labour
1938	F. T. Howarth	United
1943	F. T. Howarth	United
1948	Alex Hepple	Labour
1953	Alex Hepple	Labour
1958	E. L. Fisher	United
1961	E. L. Fisher	United
1966	E. L. Fisher	United
1970	E. L. Fisher	United
1974	E. L. Fisher	United
1977	H. M. J. van Rensburg	National
1981	H. M. J. van Rensburg	National
1987	Sheila Camerer	National
1989	Sheila Camerer	National
1994	Constituency abolished	

== Detailed results ==
=== Elections in the 1930s ===
General election 1933: Rosettenville
Party	Candidate	Votes	%	±%
South African	E. P. Baumann	2,331	60.5	New
Labour (N.C.)	G. McCormick	1,486	38.6	New
Rejected ballots		36	0.9	N/A
Majority		418	21.9	N/A
Turnout		3,853	60.8	N/A
South African win (new seat)				

Rosettenville by-election, 6 May 1936
Party	Candidate	Votes	%	±%
Labour	John Christie	1,750	39.0	+0.4
United	E. T. Stubbs	1,231	27.5	New
Dominion	B. Jenkins	1,132	25.3	New
Independent	F. A. W. Lucas	260	5.8	New
Independent	H. S. Coaker	88	2.0	New
Rejected ballots		22	0.4	-0.5
Majority		519	11.6	N/A
Turnout		4,483	67.7	+6.9
Labour gain from South African		Swing	N/A	

General election 1938: Rosettenville
Party	Candidate	Votes	%	±%
United	F. T. Howarth	3,206	59.6	−0.9
Labour	C. Beckett	2,139	39.8	+1.2
Rejected ballots		32	0.6	-0.3
Majority		1,067	19.8	−2.1
Turnout		5,377	73.9	+13.1
United hold		Swing	-1.1	
