= Port Elizabeth North (House of Assembly of South Africa constituency) =

- Port Elizabeth-Noord
- Former constituency for the South African House of Assembly
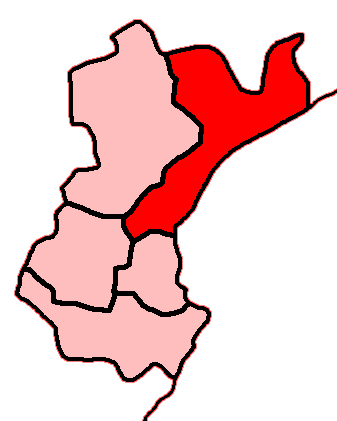
- Location of Port Elizabeth North within Port Elizabeth (1981)
- Province: Cape of Good Hope
- Electorate: 15,520 (1989)

Former constituency
- Created: 1929
- Abolished: 1994
- Number of members: 1
- Last MHA: Gert Myburgh (NP)
- Replaced by: Eastern Cape

Port Elizabeth North (Afrikaans: Port Elizabeth-Noord) was a constituency in the Cape Province of South Africa, which existed from 1929 to 1994. As the name indicates, the seat covered the northern suburbs of Port Elizabeth (now Gqeberha). Throughout its existence it elected one member to the House of Assembly and one to the Cape Provincial Council.

== Franchise notes ==
When the Union of South Africa was formed in 1910, the electoral qualifications in use in each pre-existing colony were kept in place. The Cape Colony had implemented a "colour-blind" franchise known as the Cape Qualified Franchise, which included all adult literate men owning more than £75 worth of property (controversially raised from £25 in 1892), and this initially remained in effect after the colony became the Cape Province. As of 1908, 22,784 out of 152,221 electors in the Cape Colony were "Native or Coloured". Eligibility to serve in Parliament and the Provincial Council, however, was restricted to whites from 1910 onward.

The first challenge to the Cape Qualified Franchise came with the Women's Enfranchisement Act, 1930 and the Franchise Laws Amendment Act, 1931, which extended the vote to women and removed property qualifications for the white population only – non-white voters remained subject to the earlier restrictions. In 1936, the Representation of Natives Act removed all black voters from the common electoral roll and introduced three "Native Representative Members", white MPs elected by the black voters of the province and meant to represent their interests in particular. A similar provision was made for Coloured voters with the Separate Representation of Voters Act, 1951, and although this law was challenged by the courts, it went into effect in time for the 1958 general election, which was thus held with all-white voter rolls for the first time in South African history. The all-white franchise would continue until the end of apartheid and the introduction of universal suffrage in 1994.

== History ==
When initially created, Port Elizabeth North was a safe seat for the South African Party – it won the first two elections in the seat unopposed, and (along with its successor the United Party) continued to win large majorities for the next twenty years. In 1953, however, the seat fell to the National Party, which would hold it for the entire rest of its existence, usually by wide margins. Its last MP, Gert Myburgh, served as a junior minister in the F. W. de Klerk government.

== Members ==
Election	Member	Party
1929	C. F. Kayser	South African
1933	C. F. Kayser	South African
1936 by	Henry Albert Johnson	United
1938	Henry Albert Johnson	United
1943	Henry Albert Johnson	United
1948	Henry Albert Johnson	United
1949 by	J. A. Cull	United
1953	J. A. F. Nel	National
1958	J. A. F. Nel	National
1961	J. A. F. Nel	National
1966	S. P. Potgieter	National
1970	S. P. Potgieter	National
1974	S. P. Potgieter	National
1977	S. P. Potgieter	National
1981	G. J. van der Linde	National
1987	Gert Myburgh	National
1989	Gert Myburgh	National
1994	constituency abolished	

== Detailed results ==
=== Elections in the 1920s ===
General election 1929: Port Elizabeth North
Party	Candidate	Votes	%	±%
South African	C. F. Kayser	Unopposed		
South African win (new seat)				

=== Elections in the 1930s ===
General election 1933: Port Elizabeth North
Party	Candidate	Votes	%	±%
South African	C. F. Kayser	Unopposed		
South African hold				

Port Elizabeth North by-election, 22 January 1936
Party	Candidate	Votes	%	±%
United	H. A. Johnson	1,889	31.8	New
Labour	C. A. Retief	1,799	30.3	New
Dominion	W. H. Stuart	1,682	28.3	New
Greyshirt	L. T. Weichardt	498	8.4	New
Rejected ballots		67	1.2	N/A
Majority		90	1.5	N/A
Turnout		5,935	75.3	N/A
United gain from South African		Swing	N/A	

General election 1938: Port Elizabeth North
Party	Candidate	Votes	%	±%
United	H. A. Johnson	3,363	47.6	New
Purified National	F. J. A. Claassen	2,324	32.9	New
Dominion	J. R. Mellor	703	9.9	New
Labour	F. C. Gallant	638	9.0	New
Rejected ballots		40	0.6	N/A
Majority		1,039	14.7	N/A
Turnout		7,068	80.6	N/A
United hold		Swing	N/A	

=== Elections in the 1930s ===
General election 1943: Port Elizabeth North
Party	Candidate	Votes	%	±%
United	H. A. Johnson	5,542	70.7	+22.8
Reunited National	F. J. A. Claassen	2,293	29.3	−3.8
Majority		3,249	41.4	+26.6
Turnout		7,835	75.9	−4.7
United hold		Swing	+13.3	
