= Pretoria West (House of Assembly of South Africa constituency) =

South African constituency, 1910–1994

- Pretoria-Wes
- Former constituency for the South African House of Assembly
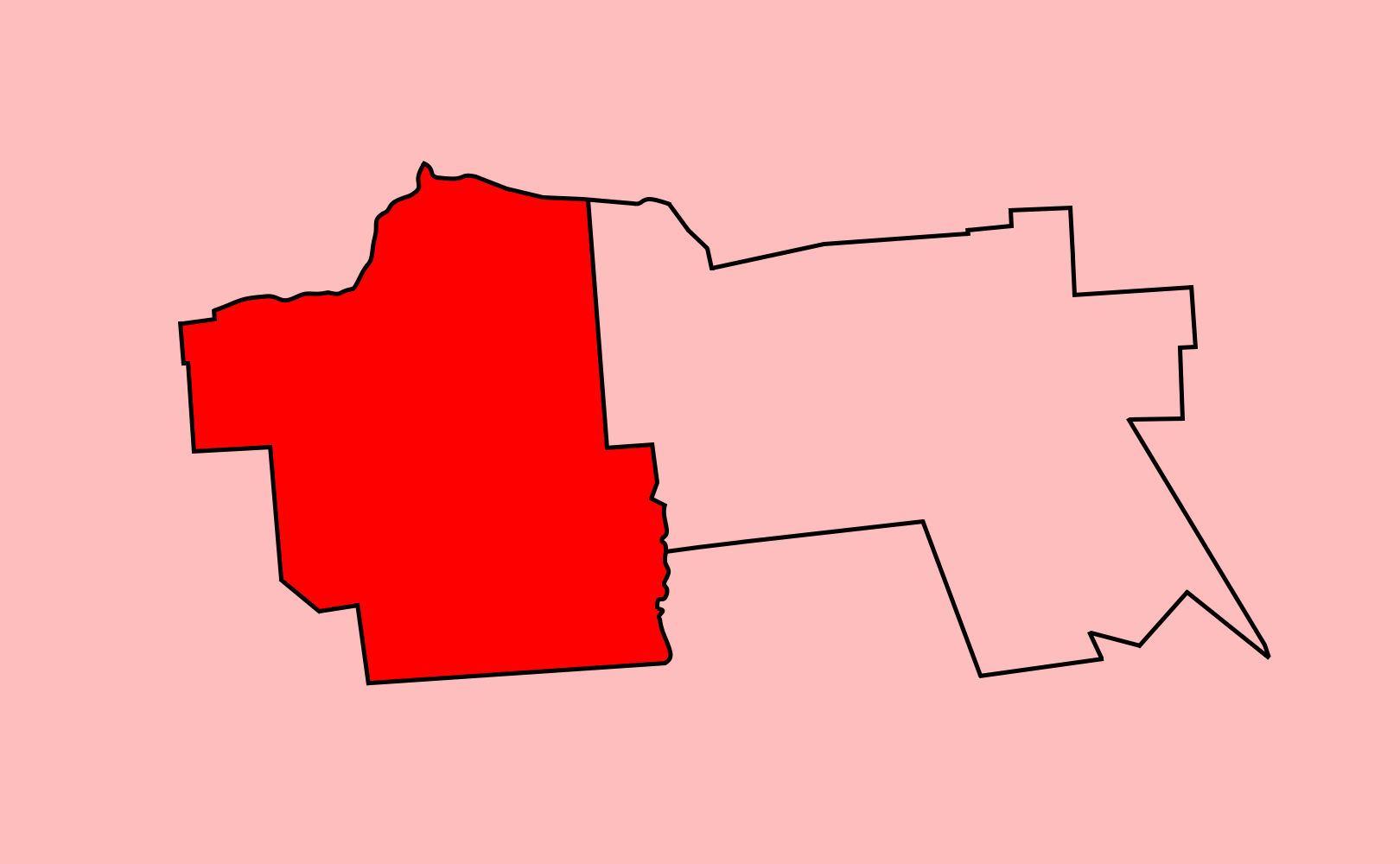
- Location of Pretoria West within Pretoria (1910)
- Province: Transvaal
- Electorate: 23,906 (1989)

Former constituency
- Created: 1910
- Abolished: 1994
- Number of members: 1
- Last MHA: Joseph Chiolé (CP)
- Replaced by: Gauteng

Pretoria West (Afrikaans: Pretoria-Wes) was a constituency in the Transvaal Province of South Africa, which existed from 1910 to 1994. It covered the western parts of Pretoria, the administrative capital of South Africa. Throughout its existence it elected one member to the House of Assembly and one to the Transvaal Provincial Council.

== Franchise notes ==
When the Union of South Africa was formed in 1910, the electoral qualifications in use in each pre-existing colony were kept in place. In the Transvaal Colony, and its predecessor the South African Republic, the vote was restricted to white men, and as such, elections in the Transvaal Province were held on a whites-only franchise from the beginning. The franchise was also restricted by property and education qualifications until the 1933 general election, following the passage of the Women's Enfranchisement Act, 1930 and the Franchise Laws Amendment Act, 1931. From then on, the franchise was given to all white citizens aged 21 or over. Non-whites remained disenfranchised until the end of apartheid and the introduction of universal suffrage in 1994.

== History ==
As initially created, Pretoria West covered the western half of its namesake city, and was a stronghold of the South African Party. This was partly due to the fact that its first MP was South African War hero, future SAP leader and twice Prime Minister, Jan Smuts. Smuts was re-elected three times by strong margins, however, his personal unpopularity following the Rand Rebellion led to his defeat, both nationally and in his own seat, by a coalition of the National and Labour parties. As a result, for the five years between 1924 and 1929, Pretoria West became the only Pretoria seat ever to have been held by Labour. This didn't last – in 1929, with the Labour Party in a state of civil war over its participation in government, Labour MP George Hay stood down and the seat was taken by the Nationalists.

With the exception of 1938 and 1943, when the United Party dominated across the Transvaal, Pretoria West would now be an NP seat. Over time, it became an extremely safe one, and when it began to be seriously contested again, it was by the far-right Conservative Party. Its final MP, Conservative Joseph Chiolé, remained active in right-wing politics following the end of apartheid, first as a member of the Freedom Front and then of the Herstigte Nasionale Party.

== Members ==
Election	Member	Party
1910	Jan Smuts	South African
1915	Jan Smuts	South African
1920	Jan Smuts	South African
1921	Jan Smuts	South African
1924	G. A. Hay	Labour
1929	M. S. W. du Toit	National
1933	M. S. W. du Toit	National
1934	M. S. W. du Toit	United
1938	Izaak Wallach	United
1943	Frank Hopf	United
1948	D. P. van Heerden	HNP
1953	Barend van der Walt	National
1958	Barend van der Walt	National
1961	Barend van der Walt	National
1966	Barend van der Walt	National
1968 by	R. J. J. Pieterse	National
1970	R. J. J. Pieterse	National
1974	R. J. J. Pieterse	National
1975 by	Z. P. le Roux	National
1977	Z. P. le Roux	National
1981	Z. P. le Roux	National
1987	Z. P. le Roux	National
1989	Joseph Chiolé	Conservative
1994	constituency abolished	

== Detailed results ==
=== Elections in the 1910s ===
General election 1910: Pretoria West
Party	Candidate	Votes	%	±%
Het Volk	Jan Smuts	999	51.4	New
Unionist	F. Hopley	644	33.1	New
Labour	J. Reid	228	11.7	New
Independent	H. R. Abercrombie	74	3.8	New
Majority		355	18.3	N/A
Het Volk win (new seat)				

General election 1915: Pretoria West
Party	Candidate	Votes	%	±%
South African	Jan Smuts	1,102	50.0	−1.4
National	H. Reitz	808	36.7	New
Labour	G. H. McLean	293	13.3	+1.6
Majority		294	13.3	N/A
Turnout		2,203	80.8	N/A
South African hold		Swing	N/A	

=== Elections in the 1920s ===
General election 1920: Pretoria West
Party	Candidate	Votes	%	±%
South African	Jan Smuts	1,720	68.8	+18.8
National	J. H. Schoeman	473	18.9	−17.8
Labour	F. H. Blake	303	12.1	−1.2
Independent	R. Read		0.2	New
Majority		1,247	49.9	+36.6
Turnout		2,500	66.4	−16.4
South African hold		Swing	+18.3	

General election 1921: Pretoria West
Party	Candidate	Votes	%	±%
South African	Jan Smuts	1,403	71.3	+3.5
National	S. J. Eloff	531	27.0	+8.1
Independent	P. M. van der Westhuizen	35	1.8	New
Majority		872	44.3	−5.6
Turnout		1,969	48.5	−17.9
South African hold		Swing	-2.8	

General election 1924: Pretoria West
Party	Candidate	Votes	%	±%
Labour	G. A. Hay	1,407	57.5	New
South African	Jan Smuts	1,022	41.8	−39.5
Independent	P. J. Botes	7	0.3	New
Rejected ballots		10	0.3	N/A
Majority		385	15.7	N/A
Turnout		2,446	82.8	+34.3
Labour gain from South African		Swing	N/A	

General election 1929: Pretoria West
Party	Candidate	Votes	%	±%
National	M. S. W. du Toit	1,397	55.1	New
South African	C. W. Clark	1,050	41.4	−0.4
Labour (N.C.)	T. B. Rutherford	57	2.3	New
Rejected ballots		33	1.2	+0.9
Majority		347	15.7	N/A
Turnout		2,537	81.3	−1.5
National gain from Labour		Swing	N/A	

=== Elections in the 1930s ===
General election 1933: Pretoria West
Party	Candidate	Votes	%	±%
National	M. S. W. du Toit	1,638	38.8	−16.3
Independent	F. Hopf	1,394	33.0	New
Roos	A. J. Bruwer	1,167	27.7	New
Rejected ballots		20	0.5	-0.7
Majority		244	5.8	N/A
Turnout		4,219	64.4	−16.9
National hold		Swing	N/A	

General election 1938: Pretoria West
Party	Candidate	Votes	%	±%
United	Izaak Wallach	2,330	44.4	+5.6
Purified National	M. D. C. de W. Nel	2,178	41.5	New
Labour	T. P. C. Boezaart	715	13.6	New
Rejected ballots		21	0.5	+-0
Majority		152	2.9	N/A
Turnout		5,244	71.9	+6.5
United hold		Swing	N/A	
