= Langlaagte (House of Assembly of South Africa constituency) =

- Former constituency for the South African House of Assembly
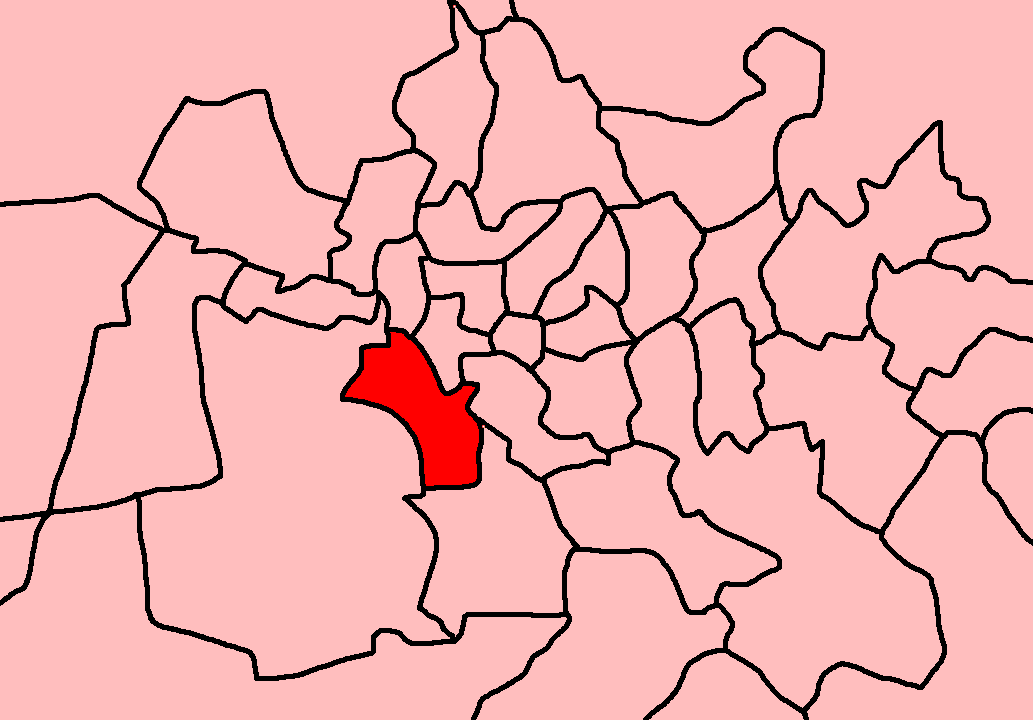
- Location of Langlaagte within the Witwatersrand (1981)
- Province: Transvaal
- Electorate: 19,586 (1989)

Former constituency
- Created: 1910
- Abolished: 1994
- Number of members: 1
- Last MHA: J. J. Vilonel (NP)
- Replaced by: Gauteng

Langlaagte was a constituency in the Transvaal Province of South Africa, which existed from 1910 to 1994. It covered a part of the inner western suburbs of Johannesburg, centred on the suburb of Langlaagte. Throughout its existence it elected one member to the House of Assembly and one to the Transvaal Provincial Council.

== Franchise notes ==
When the Union of South Africa was formed in 1910, the electoral qualifications in use in each pre-existing colony were kept in place. In the Transvaal Colony, and its predecessor the South African Republic, the vote was restricted to white men, and as such, elections in the Transvaal Province were held on a whites-only franchise from the beginning. The franchise was also restricted by property and education qualifications until the 1933 general election, following the passage of the Women's Enfranchisement Act, 1930 and the Franchise Laws Amendment Act, 1931. From then on, the franchise was given to all white citizens aged 21 or over. Non-whites remained disenfranchised until the end of apartheid and the introduction of universal suffrage in 1994.

== History ==
Langlaagte was a largely working-class constituency, and followed the general trend of such areas across South Africa's major cities. In its early years, it was a marginal seat, with John Christie of the Labour Party and William Bawden of the South African Party fighting a number of spirited contests. Bawden went on to hold the seat throughout the 1930s, switching to the United Party on that party's formation, and the UP held it until 1953, at which point it fell to the governing National Party. Over time it became more and more of a safe seat for the NP, which held it until the end of apartheid in spite of challenges from the Conservative Party in its later years.

== Members ==
Election	Member	Party
1910	Willie Rockey	Unionist
1915	Willie Rockey	Unionist
1920	Willie Rockey	Unionist
1921	John Christie	Labour
1924	John Christie	Labour
1929 by	William Bawden	South African
1929	John Christie	Labour
1933	William Bawden	South African
1934	William Bawden	United
1938	William Bawden	United
1943	William Bawden	United
1947 by	A. E. P. Robinson	United
1948	A. E. P. Robinson	United
1953	P. J. Coetzee	National
1958	P. J. Coetzee	National
1961	P. J. Coetzee	National
1966	A. L. Raubenheimer	National
1970	P. Z. J. van Vuuren	National
1974	S. D. Barnard	National
1977	S. D. Barnard	National
1981	S. D. Barnard	National
1987	J. J. Vilonel	National
1989	J. J. Vilonel	National
1994	Constituency abolished	

== Detailed results ==
=== Elections in the 1910s ===
General election 1910: Langlaagte
Party	Candidate	Votes	%	±%
Unionist	Willie Rockey	945	56.8	New
Labour	W. J. Wybergh	718	43.2	New
Majority		227	13.6	N/A
Unionist win (new seat)				

General election 1915: Langlaagte
Party	Candidate	Votes	%	±%
Unionist	Willie Rockey	794	47.0	−9.8
National	D. S. H. Pollock	560	33.1	New
Labour	C. S. Raath	260	15.4	−27.8
Independent	J. A. Clark	77	4.6	New
Majority		234	13.9	N/A
Turnout		1,691	73.5	N/A
Unionist hold		Swing		

=== Elections in the 1920s ===
General election 1920: Langlaagte
Party	Candidate	Votes	%	±%
Unionist	Willie Rockey	752	40.0	−7.0
Labour	C. S. Raath	649	34.5	+19.1
National	D. S. H. Pollock	479	25.5	−7.6
Majority		103	5.5	N/A
Turnout		1,880	61.7	−11.8
Unionist hold		Swing	N/A	

General election 1921: Langlaagte
Party	Candidate	Votes	%	±%
Labour	John Christie	1,036	52.4	+17.9
South African	Willie Rockey	940	47.6	+7.6
Majority		96	4.8	N/A
Turnout		1,976	62.6	+0.9
Labour gain from Unionist		Swing	+5.2	

General election 1924: Langlaagte
Party	Candidate	Votes	%	±%
Labour	John Christie	1,333	54.8	+2.4
South African	Willam Bawden	1,090	44.8	−2.8
Rejected ballots		11	0.4	N/A
Majority		243	10.0	+5.2
Turnout		2,434	81.2	+18.6
Labour hold		Swing	+2.6	

Langlaagte by-election, 8 January 1929
Party	Candidate	Votes	%	±%
South African	Willam Bawden	1,170	56.2	+11.4
Labour	John Christie	895	43.0	−11.8
Rejected ballots		16	0.8	+0.4
Majority		275	13.2	N/A
Turnout		2,081	66.5	−14.7
South African gain from Labour		Swing	+11.6	

General election 1929: Langlaagte
Party	Candidate	Votes	%	±%
Labour (Creswell)	John Christie	1,135	51.3	-3.5
South African	Willam Bawden	1,064	48.1	+3.3
Rejected ballots		15	0.6	+0.2
Majority		71	3.2	−6.8
Turnout		2,214	78.5	−2.7
Labour hold		Swing	-3.4	

=== Elections in the 1930s ===
General election 1933: Langlaagte
Party	Candidate	Votes	%	±%
South African	Willam Bawden	2,175	51.7	+3.6
Labour (Creswell)	John Christie	1,985	47.2	−4.1
Rejected ballots		45	1.1	+0.5
Majority		190	4.5	N/A
Turnout		4,205	67.8	−10.7
South African gain from Labour		Swing	+3.9	

General election 1938: Langlaagte
Party	Candidate	Votes	%	±%
United	Willam Bawden	2,631	48.8	−2.9
Labour	John Christie	1,963	36.4	−10.8
Purified National	W. P. Thorn	571	10.6	New
Independent	J. R. Hull	190	3.5	New
Rejected ballots		33	0.7	-0.4
Majority		668	12.4	+7.9
Turnout		5,388	72.4	+4.6
United hold		Swing	+4.0	
