= Umlazi (House of Assembly of South Africa constituency) =

- Former constituency for the South African House of Assembly
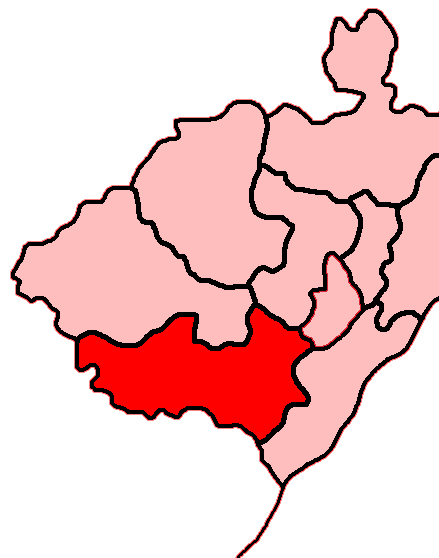
- Location of Umlazi within Durban (1981)
- Province: Natal
- Electorate: 20,226 (1990 by)

Former constituency
- Created: 1910; 1929
- Abolished: 1920; 1994
- Number of members: 1
- Last MHA: Piet Matthee (NP)
- Replaced by: Illovo (1920); KwaZulu-Natal (1994)

Umlazi, known as Durban Umlazi (Afrikaans: Durban-Umlazi) until 1966, was a constituency in the Natal Province of South Africa, which existed from 1910 to 1920 and again from 1929 to 1994. It covered a part of Durban's southern suburbs. Throughout its existence it elected one member to the House of Assembly.

== Franchise notes ==
When the Union of South Africa was formed in 1910, the electoral qualifications in use in each pre-existing colony were kept in place. The franchise used in the Natal Colony, while theoretically not restricted by race, was significantly less liberal than that of the Cape, and no more than a few hundred non-white electors ever qualified. In 1908, an estimated 200 of the 22,786 electors in the colony were of non-European descent, and by 1935, only one remained. By 1958, when the last non-white voters in the Cape were taken off the rolls, Natal too had an all-white electorate. The franchise was also restricted by property and education qualifications until the 1933 general election, following the passage of the Women's Enfranchisement Act, 1930 and the Franchise Laws Amendment Act, 1931. From then on, the franchise was given to all white citizens aged 21 or over, which remained the case until the end of apartheid and the introduction of universal suffrage in 1994.

== History ==
As in most of Durban, the electorate of Umlazi was largely English-speaking. Like neighbouring Umbilo, its economy was dominated by the Port of Durban, but its politics were slightly more conservative. Its first MP, who represented the seat throughout its first iteration, was Alfred Fawcus, who was first elected as an independent (Natal having had no party system prior to unification) but later joined the governing South African Party. On Umlazi's abolition in 1920, Fawcus stood for the newly-created seat of Illovo, but lost to Unionist candidate J. S. Marwick.

Umlazi returned in 1929, and the SAP took it once again with F. H. Acutt, who would represent it for one term before standing down. In 1933, the SAP entered an electoral pact with the National Party to support the government of Prime Minister J. B. M. Hertzog. This was wildly unpopular in staunchly pro-British Durban, and Umlazi was one of two seats in the city where an anti-SAP "Home Rule" candidate was able to defeat the official candidate. Samuel Sidney Sutton, Umlazi's new MP, only served a single term, but he was replaced by Abraham Goldberg of the similarly-minded Dominion Party. Goldberg was followed by Norman George Eaton of the Labour Party, who was elected thanks to a pact with the UP, and would go on to represent neighbouring Umhlatuzana as a UP member starting in 1958. At that same election, the UP took Umlazi, and held it until their dissolution in 1977. By then, Umlazi was a reliably conservative seat, and the National Party was able to capture it with Cornelius Botha. Botha, an ally of F. W. de Klerk, was appointed Administrator of Natal in 1990, which triggered a by-election at a highly sensitive point in South Africa's transition period. The NP's Piet Matthee faced stiff opposition from the staunchly pro-apartheid Conservative Party, but was able to hold the seat and represented it until its abolition in 1994.

== Members ==
Election	Member	Party
1910	Alfred Fawcus	Independent
1915	Alfred Fawcus	South African
1920	Constituency abolished	

Election	Member	Party
1929	F. H. Acutt	South African
1933	S. S. Sutton	Home Rule
1938	Abraham Goldberg	Dominion
1943	Abraham Goldberg	Dominion
1948	N. G. Eaton	Labour
1953	N. G. Eaton	Labour
1958	Harry Lewis	United Party
1961	Harry Lewis	United Party
1966	Harry Lewis	United Party
1970	C. C. von Keyserlingk	United Party
1974	C. C. von Keyserlingk	United Party
1977	Cornelius Botha	National
1981	Cornelius Botha	National
1987	Cornelius Botha	National
1989	Cornelius Botha	National
1990 by	Piet Matthee	National
1994	Constituency abolished	

== Detailed results ==
=== Elections in the 1910s ===
General election 1910: Durban Umlazi
Party	Candidate	Votes	%	±%
Independent	Alfred Fawcus	327	34.8	New
Labour	H. Humphrey	296	31.5	New
Unionist	J. Morley	158	16.8	New
Independent	C. Saunders	132	14.1	New
Independent	J. W. McKenzie	23	2.4	New
Unionist	T. Fletcher	3	0.3	New
Majority		31	3.3	N/A
Independent win (new seat)				

General election 1915: Durban Umlazi
Party	Candidate	Votes	%	±%
South African	Alfred Fawcus	849	77.2	+42.4
Labour	T. McCrystal	219	19.9	−11.6
Independent	D. St. J. Stephens	32	2.9	New
Majority		630	57.3	+54.0
Turnout		1,100	62.4	N/A
South African hold		Swing	+27.0	

=== Elections in the 1920s ===
General election 1929: Durban Umlazi
Party	Candidate	Votes	%	±%
South African	F. H. Acutt	1,354	63.0	New
Labour (N.C.)	A. Lamont	782	36.4	New
Rejected ballots		15	0.6	N/A
Majority		572	26.6	N/A
Turnout		2,151	81.7	N/A
South African win (new seat)				

=== Elections in the 1930s ===
General election 1933: Durban Umlazi
Party	Candidate	Votes	%	±%
Natal Home Rule Party	S. S. Sutton	2,321	52.3	New
South African	J. Shave	2,093	47.1	−15.9
Rejected ballots		26	0.6	+-0
Majority		228	5.1	N/A
Turnout		4,440	73.7	−8.0
Natal Home Rule Party gain from South African		Swing	N/A	

General election 1938: Durban Umlazi
Party	Candidate	Votes	%	±%
Dominion	Abraham Goldberg	2,447	45.8	New
United	J. C. de Wet	1,676	31.4	−15.7
Labour	S. S. Sutton	1,200	22.5	−29.8
Rejected ballots		20	0.3	-0.3
Majority		771	14.4	N/A
Turnout		5,343	81.4	+7.7
Dominion gain from Labour		Swing	N/A	

=== Elections in the 1990s ===
Umlazi by-election, 6 June 1990
Party	Candidate	Votes	%	±%
National	Piet Matthee	5,762	48.1	−3.6
Conservative	F. S. Hitchcock	5,215	43.5	+23.1
Democratic	T. S. Coppen	982	8.2	−19.7
Rejected ballots		27	0.3	N/A
Majority		547	4.6	N/A
Turnout		11,986	59.3	−2.9
National hold		Swing	-13.4	
