= Benoni (House of Assembly of South Africa constituency) =

- Former constituency for the South African House of Assembly
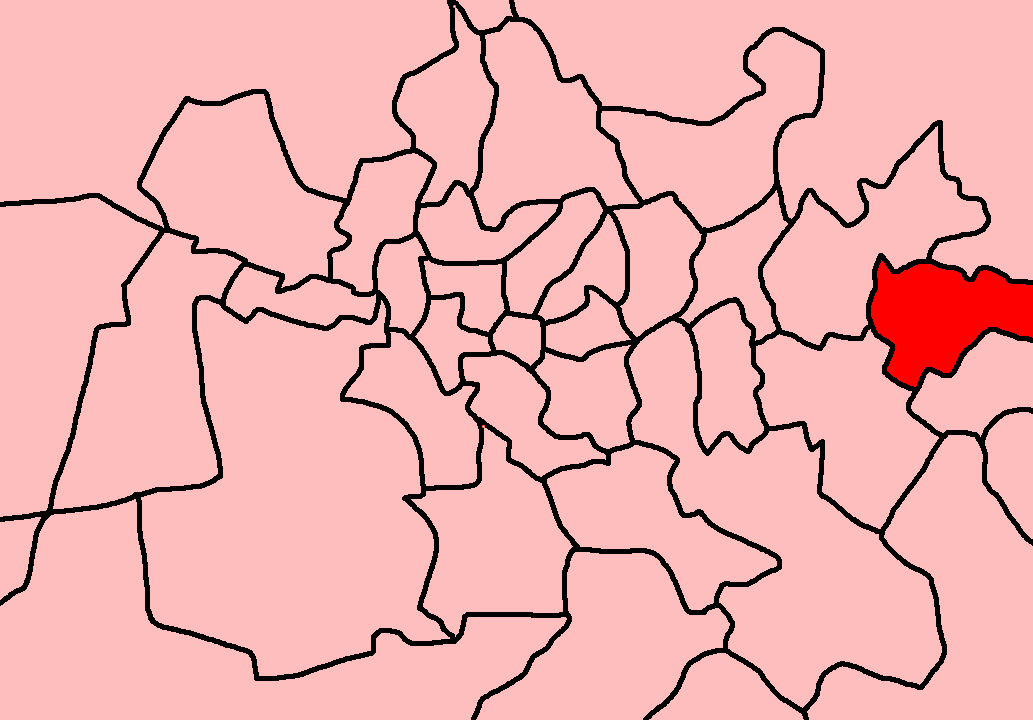
- Location of Benoni within the Witwatersrand (1981)
- Province: Transvaal
- Electorate: 20,281 (1989)

Former constituency
- Created: 1915
- Abolished: 1994
- Number of members: 1
- Last MHA: J. J. Lemmer (NP)
- Replaced by: Gauteng

Benoni was a constituency in the Transvaal Province of South Africa, which existed from 1915 to 1994. It covered a part of the East Rand centred on the town of Benoni. Throughout its existence it elected one member to the House of Assembly and one to the Transvaal Provincial Council.

== Franchise notes ==
When the Union of South Africa was formed in 1910, the electoral qualifications in use in each pre-existing colony were kept in place. In the Transvaal Colony, and its predecessor the South African Republic, the vote was restricted to white men, and as such, elections in the Transvaal Province were held on a whites-only franchise from the beginning. The franchise was also restricted by property and education qualifications until the 1933 general election, following the passage of the Women's Enfranchisement Act, 1930 and the Franchise Laws Amendment Act, 1931. From then on, the franchise was given to all white citizens aged 21 or over. Non-whites remained disenfranchised until the end of apartheid and the introduction of universal suffrage in 1994.

== History ==
The mines of the Witwatersrand were an early stronghold of South African trade unionism, and this made Benoni a safe seat for the Labour Party. Its first and longest-serving MP, Walter Madeley, was a cabinet minister in J. B. M. Hertzog's Nationalist-Labour pact government until he was fired for recognising the racially-integrated Industrial and Commercial Workers' Union. He then led the anti-Pact "National Council" faction, and was the undisputed leader of the party from 1933 until his death in 1947. By then, Labour were in an electoral pact with the United Party, who allowed them a free run in Benoni until 1958. In that year, after Labour leader Alex Hepple had broken the pact and begun to move the party in a more openly socialist and anti-apartheid direction, the UP fielded a candidate against them and won the seat.

From 1958 until 1977, Benoni was a fiercely-contested marginal seat, but the white working class was moving in a more conservative direction all across South Africa, and from 1977 onwards, the governing National Party were dominant. In the 1980s, the left-wing (Progressive/Democratic) and right-wing (Conservative) opposition parties were about equally strong in the constituency, allowing the NP to come through the middle by very safe margins.

== Members ==
Election	Member	Party
1915	Walter Madeley	Labour
1920	Walter Madeley	Labour
1921	Walter Madeley	Labour
1924	Walter Madeley	Labour
1929	Walter Madeley	Labour
1933	Walter Madeley	Labour
1938	Walter Madeley	Labour
1943	Walter Madeley	Labour
1947 by	T. W. B. Osborn	Labour
1948	T. W. B. Osborn	Labour
1949 by	Leopold Lovell	Labour
1953	Leopold Lovell	Labour
1958	D. G. Ross	United
1961	D. G. Ross	United
1966	P. Z. J. van Vuuren	National
1970	H. J. van Eck	United
1974	H. J. van Eck	United
1977	C. R. E. Rencken	National
1981	C. R. E. Rencken	National
1987	J. J. Lemmer	National
1989	J. J. Lemmer	National
1994	Constituency abolished	

== Detailed results ==
=== Elections in the 1910s ===
General election 1915: Benoni
Party	Candidate	Votes	%	±%
Labour	Walter Madeley	1,427	54.6	New
South African	G. M. Botha	648	24.8	New
National	G. van N. Schonken	539	20.6	New
Majority		779	29.8	N/A
Turnout		2,614	77.3	N/A
Labour win (new seat)				

=== Elections in the 1920s ===
General election 1920: Benoni
Party	Candidate	Votes	%	±%
Labour	Walter Madeley	1,114	51.2	−3.4
National	H. P. Venter	653	30.1	+9.5
Unionist	George Rennie	331	15.2	New
Independent	W. H. Andrews	78	3.6	New
Majority		461	21.1	−8.7
Turnout		2,176	60.8	−16.5
Labour hold		Swing	-4.4	

General election 1921: Benoni
Party	Candidate	Votes	%	±%
Labour	Walter Madeley	1,233	63.1	+11.9
National	H. P. Venter	721	36.9	+6.8
Majority		512	26.2	+5.1
Turnout		1,954	59.2	−1.6
Labour hold		Swing	+2.6	

General election 1924: Benoni
Party	Candidate	Votes	%	±%
Labour	Walter Madeley	1,236	69.1	+6.0
South African	H. P. Venter	545	30.5	New
Rejected ballots		9	0.4	N/A
Majority		691	38.6	N/A
Turnout		1,790	78.6	+19.4
Labour hold		Swing	N/A	

General election 1929: Benoni
Party	Candidate	Votes	%	±%
Labour (N.C.)	Walter Madeley	934	37.0	-32.1
Labour (Creswell)	R. B. Waterston	884	35.0	New
South African	H. P. Venter	700	27.7	−2.8
Rejected ballots		7	0.3	-0.1
Majority		50	2.0	N/A
Turnout		2,525	92.6	+14.0
Labour hold		Swing	N/A	

=== Elections in the 1930s ===
General election 1933: Benoni
Party	Candidate	Votes	%	±%
Labour (N.C.)	Walter Madeley	3,493	63.9	+26.9
South African	H. Mentz	1,929	35.3	+7.6
Rejected ballots		42	0.8	+0.5
Majority		1,564	28.6	+26.6
Turnout		5,464	82.9	−9.7
Labour hold		Swing	+13.3	

General election 1938: Benoni
Party	Candidate	Votes	%	±%
Labour	Walter Madeley	2,920	55.9	−8.0
United	R. Hilton-Howie	1,434	27.4	−7.9
Purified National	C. S. H. Potgieter	836	16.0	New
Rejected ballots		36	0.7	-0.1
Majority		1,486	28.4	−0.2
Turnout		5,226	79.2	−3.7
Labour hold		Swing	-0.1	
