= Bob Hepple =

South African-British legal scholar and activist

Sir Bob Alexander Hepple QC (Hon.) FBA OLG (11 August 1934 – 21 August 2015) was a South African-born legal academic and leader in the fields of labour law, equality and human rights.

== Early life and education ==
He was the son of Alexander Hepple (1904–1983), who was Leader of the South African Labour Party, and Josephine Zwarenstein (1906–1992) a Dutch Jew. He was educated at Jeppe High School for Boys (1947–1951), the University of the Witwatersrand (B.A.,1954, LLB cum laude and Society of Advocates Prize for Best Law Graduate, 1957), and the University of Cambridge (LLB, 1966, LLD 1993).

== Career ==
He was a lecturer in law at the University of the Witwatersrand (1959–62), and practised as an Advocate at the Johannesburg Bar (1962–63). He was active as a student leader against racial segregation in the universities, worked as an adviser and assistant in the South African Congress of Trade Unions, and participated in the underground struggle against apartheid. He acted as legal adviser to Nelson Mandela in his trial for incitement in 1962, and was arrested at Liliesleaf Farm, Rivonia, with leaders of the African National Congress and Communist Party on 11 July 1963. He was held in 90-day detention without trial. "Hepple was also one of the original Rivonia Trial accused", "he was discharged on 30 October 1963", and managed to escape to England in November 1963.

He went as a graduate student to Clare College, Cambridge (1964–1966) and was appointed to a lectureship in law at the University of Nottingham (1966–1968), returning to Cambridge as a Fellow of Clare College and university lecturer (1969–1976). He became Professor of Social and Labour Law in the University of Kent at Canterbury (1976) and a chairman of Industrial Tribunals (full-time 1977–82, part-time 1974–77, 1982–1993). He was appointed Professor of English Law at University College London (1982–93) and was dean and head of the Faculty of Laws (1989–1993). In 1993 he was elected Master of Clare College Cambridge (until 2003), and was appointed Professor of Law in the university (1995–2001). He was elected as a Fellow of the British Academy in 2003. He has been awarded honorary doctorates in law by the University of the Witwatersrand, University of Cape Town, University College London, University of Kent, and the Universita degli Studi di Bari, Italy, and was Hon. Professor of Law in the University of Cape Town (1999–2006). The honour of Knight Bachelor was bestowed on him for services to legal studies in 2004. In 2013 he was awarded the first Labour Law Research Network Award for Distinguished Contributions to Labour Law. In 2014 he received the South African Order of Luthuli (Gold) for his exceptional contribution to the struggle for democracy and human rights.

He was a barrister and Bencher of Gray's Inn and was appointed Queen's Counsel (hon) in 1996. He practised successively at 2 Crown Office Row, Old Square Chambers and Blackstone Chambers until 2007. He served on the Lord Chancellor's advisory committee on Legal Education and Conduct (1994–1999) and Legal Services Panel (2000–2002). He was a judge and senior vice-president of the UN Administrative Tribunal (2007–2009). He was a member of the Nuffield Council on Bioethics 2000–2003, chair from 2003 to 2007. He also chaired the council's Working Parties on Genetics and human behaviour (2000–2002) and The forensic use of bioinformation (2006–2007). He was a member of the Commission for Racial Equality (1986–1990), a trustee of the Canon Collins Educational Trust for South Africa (1989–2007), Chair of the European Roma Rights Centre, based in Budapest (2001–2007), and chair of the Equal Rights Trust, an international human rights organisation based in London (2007–14). He was elected Hon President of the Industrial Law Society in 2012 and Hon President of the Equal Rights Trust in 2014.

== Personal life ==
He married Shirley Goldsmith in 1960 (dissolved 1994), with whom he had two children and four grandchildren. He married Mary Coussey in 1994, and had two stepchildren. He died on 21 August 2015 at the age of 81.

== Publications ==
=== Books ===
- "Race, Jobs and the Law in Britain" (2nd ed 1970)
- "Hepple and Matthews' Tort Law: Cases and Materials" [editor and contributor] (1985)
- "The Making of Labour Law in Europe: [editor and contributor] (1986)
- "Equality: a New Legal Framework? Independent Review of the Enforcement of UK Anti-Discrimination Legislation" [with M. Coussey and T.C.Choudhury] (2000)
- Labour Laws and Global Trade(2005)
- "The Transformation of Labour Law in Europe" [editor and contributor] (2009)
- "Equality: the New Legal Framework" (2011), 2nd ed (2014)
- "Alex Hepple:South African Socialist" (2011)
- "Young Man with a Red Tie: a memoir of Mandela and the failed revolution 1960-1963"(2013)
