= Gert Myburgh =

South African politician (1940–1996)

Deputy Minister of Justice
- In office 13 January 1995 – 11 March 1996
- Minister: Dullah Omar
- Preceded by: Chris Fismer
- Succeeded by: Sheila Camerer

Member of the National Assembly
- In office May 1994 – 11 March 1996
- Constituency: Eastern Cape

Deputy Minister of Law and Order
- In office 17 August 1992 – May 1994
- Minister: Hernus Kriel
- Succeeded by: Ministry abolished

Member of the House of Assembly

Assembly Member for Port Elizabeth North
- In office 1987–1994

Assembly Member for East London
- In office 1977–1981

Personal details
- Born: Gert Benjamin Myburgh; 13 January 1940 Somerset East, Cape Province; Union of South Africa
- Died: 11 March 1996 (aged 56) Pretoria, Gauteng; Republic of South Africa
- Party: National Party
- Education: Hoërskool Brandwag
- Alma mater: University of South Africa

Gert Benjamin Myburgh (13 January 1940 – 11 March 1996) was a South African lawyer and politician from the Eastern Cape. He served as Deputy Minister of Justice from January 1995 until his death in March 1996. He had formerly served as Deputy Minister of Law and Order from 1992 to 1994 and was a long-serving representative of the National Party (NP) in Parliament.

A lawyer by profession, Myburgh first served in Parliament from 1977 to 1981 as the representative for East London. He returned to the House of Assembly to represent a Port Elizabeth constituency from 1987 to 1994, and during that time he was appointed to F. W. de Klerk's government as Deputy Minister of Law and Order. After the abolition of apartheid in 1994, he continued as an ordinary Member of Parliament, now in the multi-racial National Assembly, until 1995, when he was appointed as Deputy Minister of Justice in the Government of National Unity.

== Early life and career ==
Myburgh was born on 13 January 1940 in Somerset East. After matriculating at the Hoërskool Brandwag in Uitenhage in 1957, he began work as a civil servant in local government, first in Uitenhage and then in Port Elizabeth. At the same time, he studied at the University of South Africa, completing a BA in 1969 and an LLB in 1974. He completed his legal clerkship at Burman, Blumberg and Saks in Port Elizabeth and was admitted as an advocate of the Eastern Cape Bar in 1975.

== Legislative career ==
=== House of Assembly: 1977–1994 ===
Myburgh was first elected to the House of Assembly in 1977 as the NP's representative in East London. He left his seat in 1981, but returned in the 1987 general election, now for the Port Elizabeth North constituency. In 1989, he was appointed to chair Parliament's Joint Committee on Justice. During the same period, he was also a member of the NP's delegation to the negotiations to end apartheid, and he served on working group 1 at the Convention for a Democratic South Africa.

On 17 August 1992, President F. W. de Klerk appointed Myburgh as Deputy Minister of Law and Order. He held that position until the apartheid government was replaced in 1994.

=== National Assembly: 1994–1996 ===
In the 1994 general election, South Africa's first under universal suffrage, Myburgh was elected to represent the NP in the new multi-racial National Assembly, serving the Eastern Cape constituency. In addition, a short while into the legislative term, President Nelson Mandela appointed him to deputise Dullah Omar as Deputy Minister of Justice in the Government of National Unity. He took office on 13 January 1995, replacing Chris Fismer.

== Personal life and death ==
Having recovered from triple bypass surgery, Myburgh died unexpectedly on 11 March 1996 after suffering a heart attack at his office in Pretoria. Sheila Camerer succeeded him as Deputy Minister of Justice.

He was married to Annetjie Myburgh, with whom he had two daughters.
