= Matthee =

Matthee is a surname. Notable people with the surname include:

- Dalene Matthee (1938–2005), South African author
- Jurie Matthee (born 2000), South African rugby player
- Maroesjka Matthee (born 1989), South African road and track cyclist
- Piet Matthee (born 1953), South African politician
- Rudi Matthee (born 1953), American historian
