= Rissik (House of Assembly of South Africa constituency) =

South African constituency, 1910–1994

- Rissik
- Former constituency for the South African House of Assembly
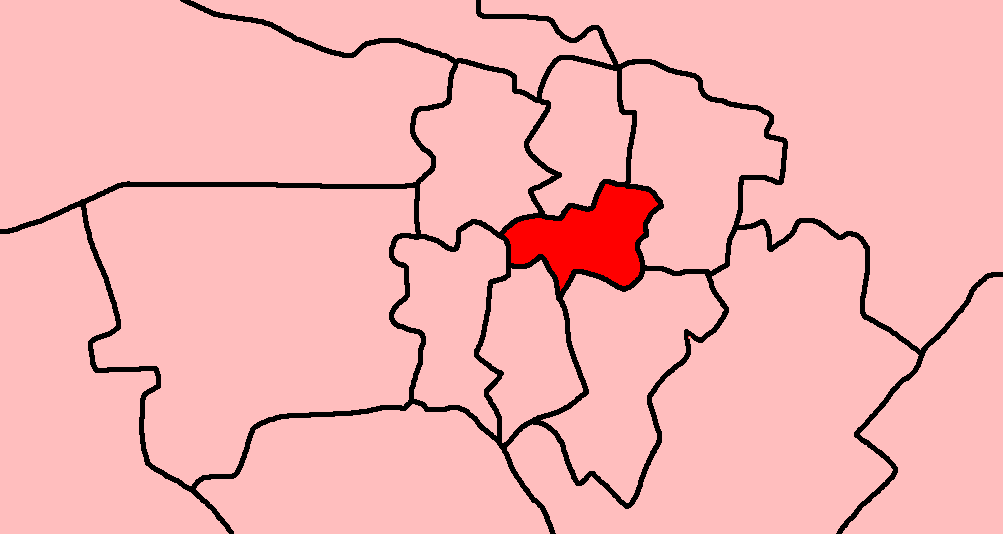
- Location of Rissik within Pretoria (1981)
- Province: Transvaal

Former constituency
- Created: 1910
- Abolished: 1994
- Number of members: 1
- Replaced by: North West

Rissik was a constituency in the Transvaal Province of South Africa, which existed from 1910 to 1994. Based on an inner area of Pretoria, throughout its existence it elected one member to the House of Assembly.

== Members ==
| Election | Parliament | Member | Party | Ref. |
|---|---|---|---|---|
| 1989 | 21st South African Parliament | Chris Fismer | NP | |
