= Cornelius Botha =

South African politician (1932–2014)

Personal details
- Born: 18 September 1932; Upington, Northern Cape, Union of South Africa
- Died: 6 February 2014 (aged 81)
- Spouse: Leonore (until 2009, her death)
- Children: 2 daughters
- Occupation: Politician

Cornelius "Con" Botha (18 September 1932 – 6 February 2014) was a South African politician and the last administrator of the Natal Province.

Born in Upington in the Northern Cape, Botha grew up in Parys in the Free State province. He graduated from Stellenbosch University with a Bachelor of Arts degree. He became a member of the former National Party and held the Umlazi constituency until 1990, when he was appointed administrator of Natal. The position was dissolved in 1994 with the province's redesignation into KwaZulu-Natal following re-incorporation of the KwaZulu bantustan. He was briefly a member of the Democratic Party (South Africa).

In 2009, Botha's wife Leonore died. In 2014, he was admitted to a hospital for gastroenteritis. Botha's condition worsened and he died from heart failure at the age of 81 in February 2014. He and Leonore were survived by two daughters.

Political offices
Preceded by Radclyffe Cadman	Administrator of Natal Province; 1990-1994	Office abolished
