= Leo Lovell =

South African and Swazi politician (1907–1976)

Leopold Lovell

Minister of Finance of Swaziland
- In office 1967–1972
- Succeeded by: Robert P. Stephens

Personal details
- Born: 1907
- Died: 1976 (aged 68–69)
- Party: Labour Party (South Africa)

Leopold Lovell was a politician from Swaziland and South Africa.

Lovell was born in 1907, in Willowmore in Eastern Cape. He was a Jew. His education was focused on classical literature. He was a member of Labour party, and represented Benoni in South African Parliament from 1949 to 1958. He was defeated in the 1958 elections. Lovell was reportedly a strong advocate against Apartheid, which eventually caused him to emigrate to Swaziland. He emigrated to Swaziland in 1961, and worked there as a lawyer.

Lovell was approached by King Sobhuza II to became his minister of finance, and he was appointed the first Minister of Finance of Swaziland from 1967 to 1972. He was a natural conservative in favor of fiscal austerity.

Lovell died in 1976.
