= John Christie (mayor) =

Irish/South African politician (1883–1953)

Mayor of Johannesburg
- In office 1920–1921
- Preceded by: G. B. Steer
- Succeeded by: S. Hancock

Leader of the South African Labour Party
- In office 1946–1953
- Preceded by: Walter Madeley
- Succeeded by: Alex Hepple

Personal details
- Born: 26 August 1883 Alva, Clackmannanshire, Scotland
- Died: 10 April 1953 (age 69) Johannesburg
- Party: Labour

John Christie (26 August 1883 – 10 April 1953), nicknamed "Honest John", was a politician, chemist and the leader of the South African Labour Party from 1946 until his death in 1953.

One of the eight children of Peter Christie and Helen Binnie, he served his apprenticeship as a chemist with Dr. James Duncan in Causeyside, Paisley, Scotland. He went to South Africa in 1901 as a member of the Royal Army Medical Corps during the Second Boer War. In 1902 he settled in Johannesburg where he qualified in his profession.

Entering public life in 1915, John became a Labour member of the Johannesburg City Council and continued until 1923. He was elected Mayor of Johannesburg in 1920–1921. He was Chairman of the Public Health Committee and of the Finance Committee. In 1921, he became the M.P. for Langlaagte, a position he held until 1933, except for a brief interruption in 1929. Later, he became the M.P. for Rosettenville (1936–1938), and in 1943 he won the seat for South Rand, which he held until 1948. He became party leader in 1946, following the party split on the subject of Indian legislation. In 1948 general election, he was elected M.P. for Johannesburg City and held this seat until 1953.

Professionally, he became a successful businessman and, together with his brother George, they owned several retail chemist stores. John was the leader in establishing the South African Pharmacy Board and became the first President when it was constituted in 1929. He held that office for nearly 20 years. In 1931 he was elected a Fellow of the Chemical Society, London.

He was a member of the Masonic Gordon Lodge in Fordsburg, Gauteng.

John Christie died in Johannesburg on 10 April 1953.
