= Sakkie Blanché =

South African politician

Member of the National Assembly
- In office 2 February 2001 – May 2009

Personal details
- Citizenship: South Africa
- Party: Democratic Alliance
- Other political affiliations: Federal Alliance; National Party

Johannes Petrus Izak "Sakkie" Blanché is a South African politician who served in Parliament both before and after the end of apartheid, representing variously the National Party (NP), the Federal Alliance (FA), and the Democratic Alliance (DA). He also served in the Gauteng Executive Council.

Blanché represented the NP in Parliament during apartheid; the Mail & Guardian said that he was "an arch-conservative". When the FA was founded in 1998, Blanché left the NP to become the FA's provincial leader in Gauteng, an office he held from August 1999 to December 2003. During that time, on 2 February 2001, Blanché was returned to Parliament, taking up a seat in the National Assembly that had been vacated by the FA's Louis Luyt.

Although the FA's union with the DA was short-lived, Blanché remained with the DA and stood on its list for re-election to the National Assembly in 2004. He was elected to represent the Gauteng constituency and served until the 2009 general election.
