= Walter Madeley =

Leader of the South African Labour party

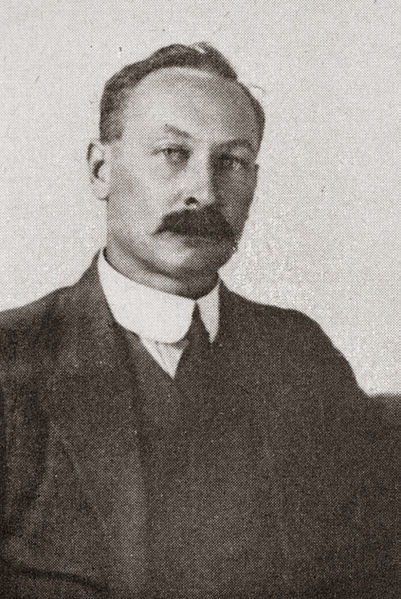
- Walter Madeley in 1928

Leader of the South African Labour Party
- In office 1928/1933–1946
- Preceded by: Frederic Creswell
- Succeeded by: John Christie

Minister of Labour
- In office 1939–1945
- Prime Minister: Jan Christiaan Smuts
- Preceded by: Harry Gordon Lawrence
- Succeeded by: Colin Fraser Steyn

Minister of Social Affairs
- In office 1941–1943
- Prime Minister: Jan Christiaan Smuts
- Preceded by: Henry Allan Fagan
- Succeeded by: Harry Gordon Lawrence

Minister of Communications, Telecommunications and Postal Services and Public Works of South Africa
- In office 1925–1928
- Prime Minister: J.B.M. Hertzog
- Preceded by: Thomas Boydell
- Succeeded by: Harry Sampson

Personal details
- Born: 28 July 1873
- Died: 12 May 1947 (aged 73)
- Party: Labour

Walter Bayley Madeley (Woolwich, England, 28 July 1873 – Boksburg, South Africa, 12 May 1947) was a leader of the South African Labour Party and a cabinet minister.

== Background ==
Madeley was born in Woolwich, England and got his schooling at Bombay Cathedral High School in India. In 1889, he became an apprentice at the Woolwich Arsenal. In 1896 he immigrated to South Africa where he was a fitter in a mine on the Rand. He joined the Amalgamated Society of Engineers and took part in various strikes. He was also the first vice-president of the Kimberley Trades Council, but was one of five of its leaders sacked by De Beers for their trade union activism. This led him to start giving public speeches, in opposition to victimisation. He relocated to the East Rand to find work, but was repeatedly victimised, and was compelled to start his own business in order to make a living.

Madeley was soon considered a leading figure in the Labour Party because of his exceptional ability. In the 1910 general election, he was first elected to the House of Assembly of South Africa as a Labour MP. He represented the districts of Springs (1910-1915), then Benoni (1915-1945).

== Sources ==
- DJ Potgieter, Standard Encyclopaedia of Southern Africa, Cape Town: Nasionale Opvoedkundige Uitgewery (Nasou) 1972.
- BM Schoeman, Parlementêre verkiesings in Suid-Afrika 1910-1976, Pretoria: Aktuele Publikasies 1977
- Peter Alexander, Workers, War & the Origins of Apartheid: Labour and Politics in South Africa, 1939-1948, James Currey Publishers, 2000
