= Joseph Chiolé =

South African politician

Member of the National Assembly
- In office May 1994 – June 1999

Personal details
- Born: 12 August 1948 (age 77)
- Citizenship: South Africa
- Party: Herstigte Nasionale Party (since 2003)
- Other political affiliations: Freedom Front (until 2003)

Joseph Chiolé (born 12 August 1948) is a retired South African politician who represented the Freedom Front (FF) in the National Assembly during the first democratic Parliament from 1994 to 1999. Afterwards he served a single term in the Gauteng Provincial Legislature; he represented the FF until March 2003, when he crossed the floor to the Herstigte Nasionale Party (HNP).

== Legislative career ==
Chiolé was born on 12 August 1948. He was elected to the National Assembly in South Africa's first post-apartheid election in 1994. During the same period, he served as the provincial leader of the FF in Gauteng.

In the 1999 general election, he was elected as the FF's sole representative in the Gauteng Provincial Legislature. Towards the end of his term, during the floor-crossing window of March 2003, he resigned from the FF to join the HNP. The FF's Corné Mulder said that the party was surprised because "we thought he would go to the Conservative Party". Chiolé left the legislature after the 2004 general election.
