= Sheila Camerer =

South African politician (born 1941)

Sheila Margaret Camerer

South Africa Ambassador to Bulgaria
- In office 2009 - 2013

Member of Parliament
- In office 2004–2009

Member of Parliament
- In office 1994–2003

Member of Parliament for Rosettenville
- In office 1987–1994

Personal details
- Born: 15 December 1941 (age 84) Cape Town, South Africa
- Party: Democratic Alliance (2003-present); New National Party (1997-2003); National Party (1982-1997)
- Spouse: Alexander Camerer
- Children: 1 son, 2 daughters

Sheila Margaret Camerer (born 15 December 1941) is a retired South African politician and was a Member of Parliament of the main opposition party, the Democratic Alliance (DA).

== Career ==
Camerer is the daughter of Bob Badenhorst Durrant and his wife, Diana. Durrant himself was a one-time UP MP for Turffontein.

Camerer graduated from the University of Cape Town where she was Rag Queen.

Like her father, Camerer had political instincts and she joined the National Party, in 1982 she was elected NP member of the Johannesburg City Council. In 1987 she was elected Member of Parliament for the Johannesburg constituency of Rosettenville and two years later appointed deputy justice minister in the government of reformist NP leader and South African president FW de Klerk. In 1989 when Camerer was a National Party member of Parliament, she said:

People are influenced by manners more than appearances. I like to believe I transfix voters with my big blue eyes.

During the constitutional negotiations on a democratic South Africa, Camerer was employed to lead the NP in drafting a Bill of Rights. Later she became a prominent spokesperson for the party in parliament, and served briefly as deputy justice minister after 1994 until De Klerk decided to suspend the party's participation in the Government of National Unity (GNU). In 1997, she became leader of the now rebranded New National Party (NNP) (which was part of the Democratic Alliance (DA)) in the National Assembly, the first-ever woman and English-speaker in the history of the NP or its successor, the NNP, to hold that post.

The New National Party withdrew from the DA in 2001, Camera remained an NNP member until 2003 when newly promulgated legislation allowed her to defect to the DA without losing her parliamentary seat.

After the 2009 South African general election Camerer was appointed as Ambassador to Bulgaria. In March 2013 Camerer completed her term as ambassador and is currently retired.
