= Alex Hepple =

South African Labour Party leader (1904–1983)

Alexander Hepple

Leader of the South African Labour Party
- In office 1953–1958
- Preceded by: John Christie
- Succeeded by: Party dissolved

Personal details
- Born: 28 August 1904 La Rochelle, Transvaal Colony
- Died: 16 November 1983 (age 79) Canterbury, England
- Party: Labour
- Children: Bob Hepple

Alexander Hepple (28 August 1904 – 16 November 1983) was a trade unionist, politician, anti-apartheid activist and author. He was the last leader of the South African Labour Party.

Hepple was born in La Rochelle, a suburb of Johannesburg to Thomas and Alice Hepple, founding members of the South African Labour Party. His father, who immigrated to South Africa from Sunderland in the north-east of England, was a shop steward of the Amalgamated Society of Engineers and a leader during its strike action in 1913.

Alex Hepple was a democratic socialist and anti-fascist activist from an early age. He was elected to the Transvaal Province's provincial council in 1943 as a Labour Party MLA and then as a Labour Member of Parliament representing Rosettenville in the House of Assembly of South Africa in the 1948 and 1953 general elections.

Hepple was leader of the South African Labour Party from 1953 to 1958 and moved it towards liberal policies on race in opposition to the apartheid National Party government. He also founded and chaired the anti-apartheid Treason Trial Defence Fund from 1956 to 1961 and chaired the South African Defence and Aid Fund from 1960 to 1964. However, the white working class electorate that had supported the Labour Party by and large rejected Hepple's policies. In the 1958 elections the Labour Party lost all five of its seats and was dissolved soon after the election.

He continued his activism after losing his parliamentary seat. In 1962, he and his wife, Josephine, re-established the newspaper, Forward which was censored and closed by down by the government in 1964. The Hepples then moved to England where they founded the International Defence and Aid Fund's Information Service, an organization that reported on repression and detentions by the apartheid government.

In 1967, Hepple wrote Verwoerd, a biography of South African Prime Minister Hendrik Verwoerd who was shaped the policy of apartheid. He also wrote South Africa: a political and economic history in 1966 as well as articles and pamphlets on South African politics.

Hepple died in 1983 in exile in Canterbury, England and was celebrated by the African National Congress whose secretary-general Alfred Nzo, wrote that Hepple "was known and loved by the oppressed people of South Africa for his opposition to the draconian apartheid policies of the South African regime."

His son, Bob Hepple, was a South African and British academic and lawyer who was "Nelson Mandela’s legal advisor through his 1962 trial". "Hepple was also one of the original Rivonia Trial accused". Bob Hepple was "knighted in 2004." "He was awarded the South African Order of Luthuli (Gold) in 2014".
