= Chris Fismer =

South African politician

Deputy Minister of General Affairs, South Africa
- In office 1994-1999
- President: Nelson Mandela

Deputy Minister of Justice, South Africa
- In office 1994-1999
- President: Nelson Mandela

Personal details
- Born: Christiaan Loedolff Fismer; 30 September 1956 (age 69)

Christiaan Loedolff Fismer (born 30 September 1956) was the Deputy Minister of General Affairs and Deputy Minister of Justice under South African President Nelson Mandela, from 1994/5 to 1999.

== Early life and education ==
Fismer was born in Pretoria and matriculated from the Afrikaanse Hoër Seunskool in 1974. He graduated from the University of Pretoria in 1978 with a Bachelor of Commerce degree before also completing a BLC degree in 1981 and LLB in 1983.

== Early career ==
Whilst at university, Fismer became more politically active, joining the National Party and serving as chairman of its Youth Action in the Transvaal in 1984/85. He also did his national service in 1982/83.

After university, Fismer served as a public prosecutor at the Pretoria Magistrates' Court before qualifying as a lawyer in the Pretoria Bar in 1986. He practised law until being elected to parliament as member for Rissik in the 1987 general election. He was elected senior Transvaal whip of the National Party in 1989.

Fismer participated in the Convention for a Democratic South Africa as National Party representative at the working group for timeframes and implementation, in December 1991. In 1993 he was appointed F. W. de Klerk's parliamentary and political assistant (Deputy Minister) until the following year when he again was returned to parliament in the April general elections.

== See also ==
- African Commission on Human and Peoples' Rights
- Constitution of South Africa
- History of the African National Congress
- Politics in South Africa
- Provincial governments of South Africa
