= Piet Matthee =

South African politician (born 1953)

Delegate to the National Council of Provinces

Assembly Member for KwaZulu-Natal
- In office June 1999 – April 2004

Member of the National Assembly
- In office May 1994 – June 1999

Member of the House of Assembly

Assembly Member for Umlazi
- In office 1990–1994
- In office 1987–1989

Personal details
- Born: Petrus Arnoldus Matthee; 10 March 1953 (age 73)
- Citizenship: South Africa
- Party: National Party; New National Party

Petrus Arnoldus "Piet" Matthee (born 10 March 1953) is a South African politician who represented the National Party (NP) and New National Party (NNP) in Parliament from 1987 to 2004, excepting a hiatus in the President's Council from 1989 to 1990. He joined Parliament during apartheid as the MP for Umlazi, KwaZulu-Natal. In the post-apartheid era, he served in the National Assembly from 1994 to 1999 and then as leader of the NNP in the National Council of Provinces (NCOP) from 1999 to 2004.

== Apartheid-era political career ==
Born on 10 March 1953, Matthee first sat in Parliament between 1987 and 1989, when he served in the all-white House of Assembly the NP's MP for the Umlazi constituency in the former Natal province. From 1989 to mid-1990, he served in the President's Council.

However, in June 1990, Matthee returned to the House of Assembly after winning an important by-election in Umlazi: it was the first by-election since 2 February, when President F. W. de Klerk had unbanned black organisations and promised to reform apartheid. Matthee narrowly defeated the candidate from the far-right anti-reform Conservative Party, winning 5,762 votes against Francis Hitchcock's 5,215.

== Post-apartheid political career ==
In South Africa's first post-apartheid elections in 1994, Matthee was elected to continue in Parliament as an NP representative in the new multi-racial National Assembly. After a single term in the National Assembly, he was elected to the NCOP in 1999, as the sole representative of the NNP (the NP's successor party) in the KwaZulu-Natal constituency.

During the NNP's short-lived participation in the multi-party Democratic Alliance (DA), Matthee led the opposition caucus in the NCOP. After the NNP withdrew from the DA in 2001, he remained the leader of the NNP's minority caucus, and in that capacity he was involved in negotiating the NNP's new cooperation agreement with the governing party, the African National Congress (ANC). In terms of the cooperation agreement, the ANC allowed Matthee to retain his seat in the NCOP even after floor-crossing in 2003 entailed that the seat technically passed to ANC control.

Though Matthee stood for re-election in 2004, the NNP performed extremely poorly in the elections, and Matthee was among the NNP members who lost their seats as a result.
