= 1958 South African general election =

- 16 April 1958

All 156 general roll seats in the House of Assembly 79 seats needed for a majority
- Registered: 1,563,426
- Turnout: 74.42% (▼13.53pp)
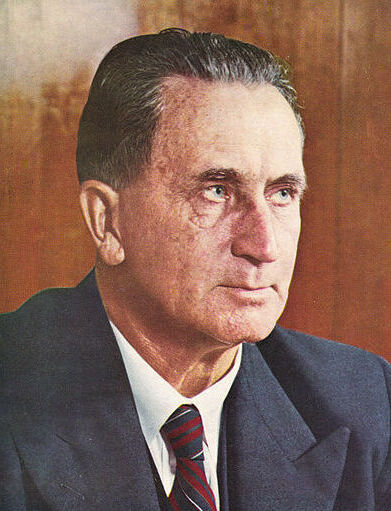

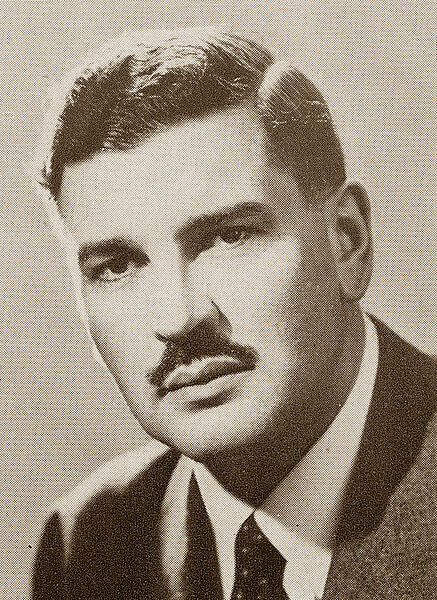
	First party	Second party
Leader	J. G. Strijdom	De Villiers Graaff
Party	National	United
Last election	49.48%, 94 seats	47.65%, 57 seats
Seats won	103	53
Seat change	▲9	▼4
Popular vote	642,006	492,080
Percentage	55.54%	42.57%
Swing	▲6.06pp	▼5.08pp
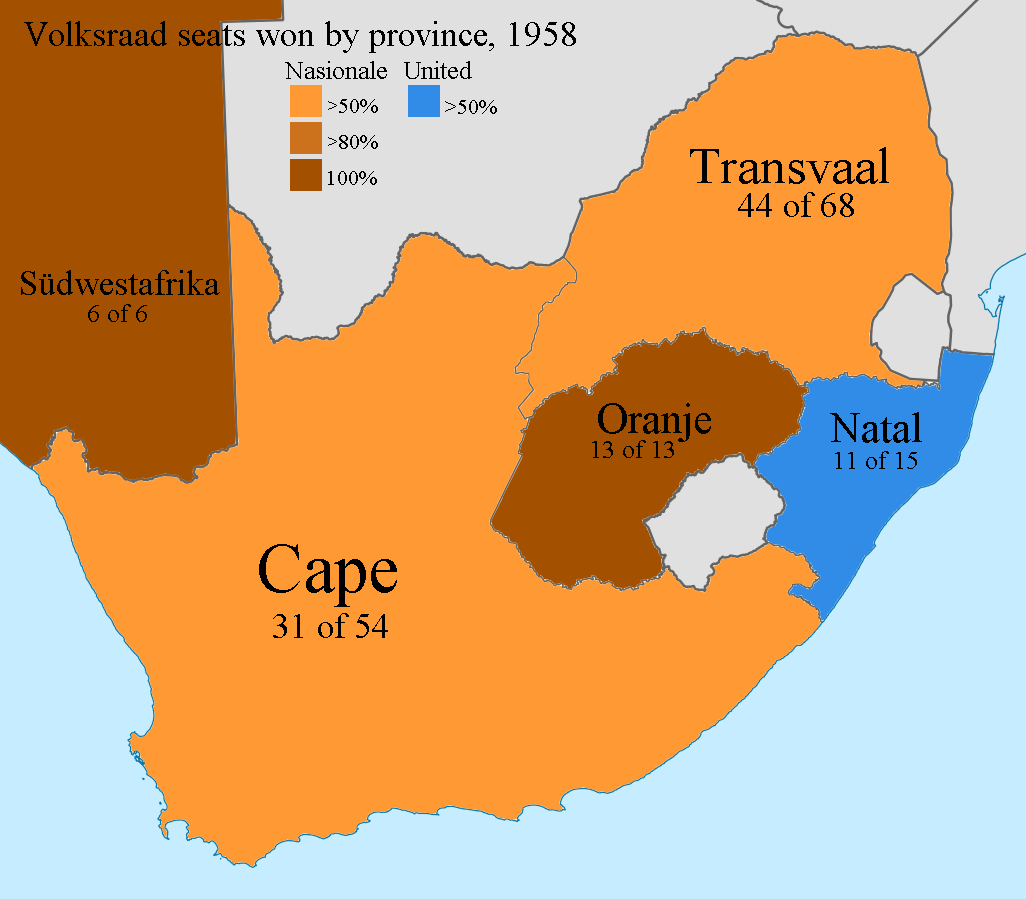
- Results by province
Prime Minister before election
J. G. Strijdom
National
Elected Prime Minister
J. G. Strijdom
National

General elections were held in South Africa on 16 April 1958. The result was a victory for the National Party, now under the leadership of J. G. Strijdom after the retirement of D. F. Malan in 1954. The opposition United Party campaigned for the first time under De Villiers Graaff, who would remain party leader for two decades.

The National Party won 103 seats in the House of Assembly. It was the first election in South Africa with a whites-only electorate, following the removal of the Cape Qualified Franchise in the late 1950s, after the resolution of the coloured vote constitutional crisis. Coloured voters were now represented by four white MPs elected in separate constituencies, after the model introduced for native (black) voters in 1936. As these latter (NMP) seats were abolished in 1960, this was the only general election in which both separate coloured and native (Black) MPs were seated.

== Changes in composition and franchise ==
=== Native Representative Members ===
The third term of the (white) MPs elected to represent black voters, from special electoral districts in Cape Province under the Representation of Natives Act 1936, expired on 30 June 1954. These seats were not vacated by a dissolution of Parliament, so they were not contested at the 1953 general election.

The three representative seats were filled by elections on 1 December 1954. Two Liberal Party of South Africa MPs (A.W.P. Stanford of Transkei and Mrs V.M.L. Ballinger of Cape Eastern) were returned. Stanford took his seat from an Independent. Ballinger had been elected as an Independent at the three previous representative elections, before becoming the first President of the Liberal Party, when it was formed on 9 May 1953. The third seat was taken by L.B. Lee-Warden, an Independent candidate.

The term of these members expired on 30 June 1960 (the first 30 June to fall after five years from the date of election). The Native Representative Members seats were to be abolished in 1960, at the end of the current term.

=== Coloured Representative Members ===
The Separate Representation of Voters Act 1951, had provided for coloured voters in Cape Province to be removed from the general voters rolls and placed on a separate roll. The coloured voters lost the right to participate in general roll elections and were given four (white) representative members in Parliament.

The implementation of the 1951 Act was delayed in what is known as the Coloured vote constitutional crisis, due to legal arguments about whether Parliament had complied with the requirement for a two-thirds majority in joint session, before it could remove the coloured voters from the general roll.

Eventually legislation to change the size and electoral system for the Senate was enacted, which the courts accepted as enabling the 1951 Act to be validated by the constitutionally required margin.

The Coloured Representative Members were elected, for the first time, on 3 April 1958, for a term expiring with the next dissolution of Parliament. Four supporters of the United Party were elected to fill the new seats.

== Delimitation of electoral divisions ==
The South Africa Act 1909 had provided for a delimitation commission to define the boundaries for each electoral division, for general roll voters in the four provinces. The representation by province, under the eleventh delimitation report of 1958, is set out in the table below. The figures in brackets are the number of electoral divisions in the previous (1953) delimitation. If there is no figure in brackets then the number was unchanged.

Provinces	Cape	Natal	Orange Free State	Transvaal	Total
Divisions	52 (54)	16 (15)	14 (13)	68	150

== Composition at dissolution ==
At the end of the 11th Union Parliament, when it was dissolved in 1958, the House of Assembly consisted of two types of members. White voters were represented by 156 members and black voters in Cape Province by three white MPs (known at the time as Native Representative Members). A third type of MP was about to be elected, so that four white MPs would represent coloured voters in Cape Province. They were known as the Coloured Representative Members (CRM).

The general election, on 16 April 1958, only affected the representatives of white voters. The other members were elected on different dates (see above).

The representation by party and province, at the dissolution was:

Province	National	United	Independents	Labour	Liberal	Total
Cape (general)	31	23	-	-	-	54
Cape (NRM)	-	-	1	-	2	3
Natal	2	11	1	1	-	15
Orange FS	13	-	-	-	-	13
SW Africa	6	-	-	-	-	6
Transvaal	44	18	3	3	-	68
Total	96	52	5	4	2	159

Abbreviations in the province list.

- Orange FS: Orange Free State
- SW Africa: South-West Africa
- NRM: Native Representative Members

== Results ==
The general election, for 156 seats in the 12th Union Parliament, was the first in South African history when only voters classified as white took part. In the eleven previous general elections, the Cape Province and Natal general electoral roll had included some black (until 1938 in the Cape), Asian (until 1948) and coloured electors.

The election saw the collapse of the South African Labour Party which lost all 5 of its seats and whose vote dropped from almost 35,000 votes in 1953 to 2,670 votes in 1958. The drop in support is largely attributed to the party leader Alex Hepple's growing outspokenness in opposition to apartheid and his co-operation with the African National Congress, positions which were not supported at the time by white workers who were the bulk of the Labour Party's electorate. Moreover, the party did not repeat its electoral alliance with the United Party, and its sole two candidates in the election - Hepple and Leo Lovell - both finished in distant third places, losing their seats to United Party candidates.

A total of 24 seats were uncontested, all of which were won by the United Party.

Party	Votes	%	Seats	+/–
National Party	642,006	55.54	103	+9
United Party	492,080	42.57	53	–4
United National South West Party	11,568	1.00	0	New
Liberal Party	2,934	0.25	0	New
Labour Party	2,670	0.23	0	–5
Suid-Afrikaneese Bond	1,074	0.09	0	New
Republican Party	85	0.01	0	New
Christian Democratic Party	34	0.00	0	New
Independents	3,552	0.31	0	New
Coloured Representative Members			4	New
Native Representative Members			3	0
Total	1,156,003	100.00	163	+4
Valid votes	1,156,003	99.35		
Invalid/blank votes	7,573	0.65		
Total votes	1,163,576	100.00		
Registered voters/turnout	1,563,426	74.42		
Source: Potgieter

=== By province ===
The overall composition of the House, after the general election, was as below. There were boundary changes, from the delimitation of seats in the previous Parliament, so no attempt is made to identify changes.

Province	National	United	Liberal	Independents	Total
Cape (general)	33	19	0	0	52
Cape (NRM)	0	0	2	1	3
Cape (CRM)	0	4	0	0	4
Natal	2	14	0	0	16
Orange FS	14	0	0	0	14
SW Africa	6	0	0	0	6
Transvaal	48	20	0	0	68
Total	103	57	2	1	163
Source: Keesings
