= Labour Party (South Africa) =

1910–1958 political party in South Africa

South African Labour Party Suid-Afrikaanse Arbeidersparty (Afrikaans)
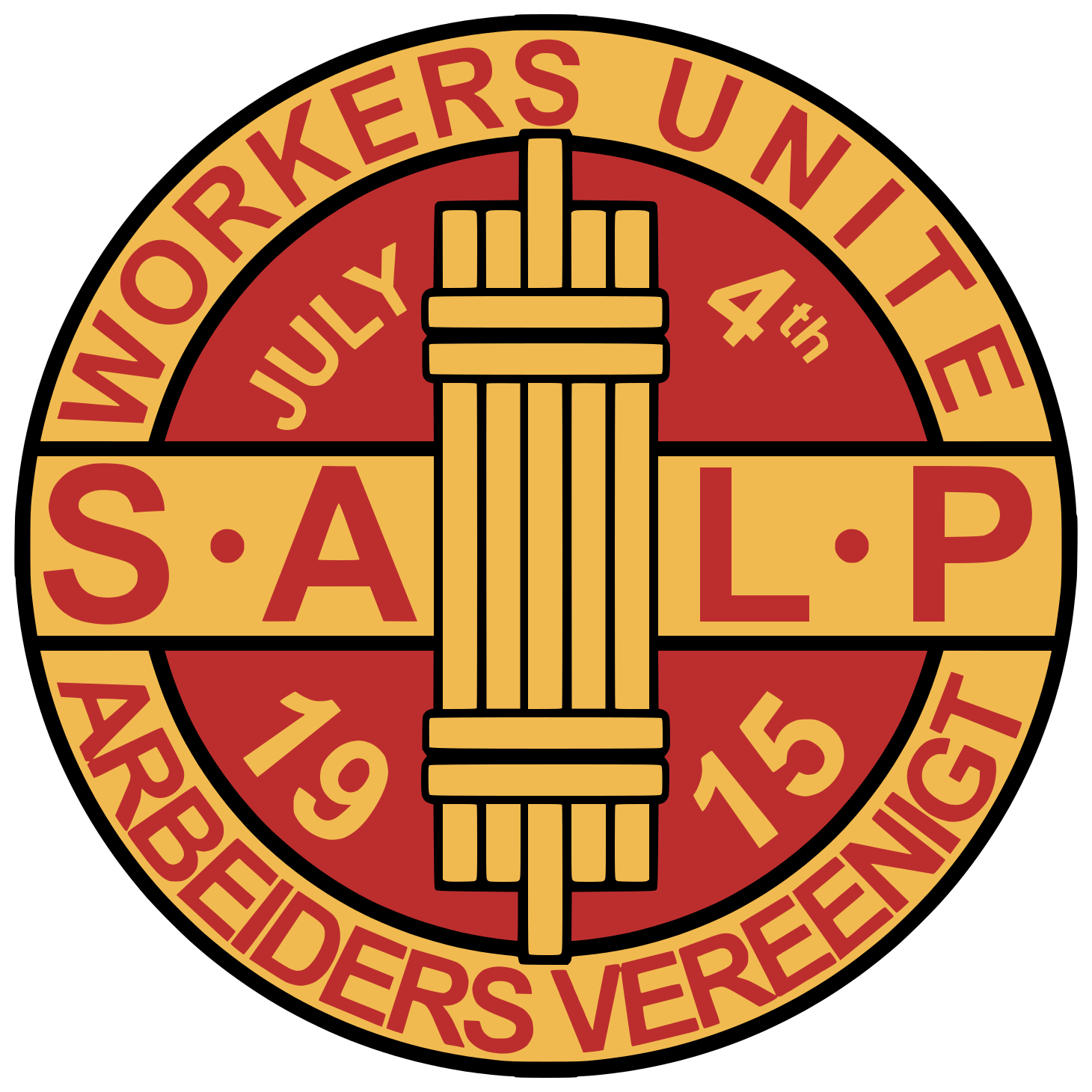
- General secretaries: Frederic Creswell; Walter Madeley
- Founded: 1910
- Dissolved: 1958
- Headquarters: Bloemfontein
- Ideology: Social democracy Democratic socialism White workers' interests
- Political position: Fiscal: Left-wing; Social: Right-wing
- Colours: Red

The South African Labour Party (Afrikaans: Suid-Afrikaanse Arbeidersparty), was a South African political party formed in March 1910 in the newly created Union of South Africa following discussions between trade unions, the Transvaal Independent Labour Party, and the Natal Labour Party. It was a professedly democratic socialist party representing the interests of the white working class.

The party received support mostly from urban white workers and for most of its existence sought to protect them from competition from black and other non-white workers.

As noted by one study, the Labour Party “exerted an influence on social legislation out of proportion to its numerical strength.”

== History ==
The party was represented in the South African House of Assembly from the South African general election, 1910 until it lost its last seats in the South African general election, 1958. It never came close to acquiring a majority in Parliament or to being the official opposition, but it did spend periods as a junior coalition partner in the government of South Africa. Between 1910 and 1929 the Party was led by Colonel F. H. P. Creswell.

Initially the party was predominantly made up of British and Australian working class migrants to South Africa; many of whom were drawn to job opportunities in the gold mines of the Transvaal. In its early years the party supported the ideology of racial based 'white labourism' and racial segregation, ideas that resulted in support of the colour bar, opposition to the non-racial franchise in the Cape Province, as well as preventing black workers from joining the party. These policies were challenged and later changed by more radical Scottish working class immigrants that supported non-racialism.

The party experienced one of its first splits following the outbreak of the First World War, when anti-war dissidents left to form the International Socialist League (ISL) in September 1915.

The worldwide depression after the end of the First World War had led to a strike in South Africa, known as the Rand Rebellion, which had been defused through a combination of military force and repression, including the imprisonment of Labour leader Frederic Creswell for a month. The government's heavy handed negotiations with the out-gunned unions earned Jan Smuts the enmity of the labour vote and the Labour Party, whose support was boosted by the growing militancy of workers. This paved the way for an election agreement between the Labour Party and the National Party (NP) for the 1924 general election, in which the two parties would not oppose each other during the election and would support each other's candidates in certain constituencies. The alliance resulted in a coalition government known as the Pact. The Labour Party provided two members of the Pact government, including its leader, Creswell, as Minister of Defence. In the event, Creswell remained in office until 1933, for much of that time doubling as Minister of Labour. While serving in government, the LP initiated important economic and industrial legislation which improved conditions for white workers. In addition, the LP also helped to alleviate unemployment amongst whites, and a year after becoming labour minister, Creswell claimed that he had found employment for 12,000 previously jobless whites. These policies, however, did nothing to enhance conditions for black workers.

In 1928, the party split between two factions. The Labour MP who was Minister of Posts, Telegraphs and Public Works, Walter Madeley, recognised the Industrial and Commercial Workers' Union, which had non-white members. This angered the National Party. As a result, Madeley was asked to resign. When the Labour Party National Council refused to agree, the Minister could only be deposed by the resignation and reconstruction of the whole Pact government. The "Creswell Labour" group, supporting the veteran party leader Colonel Creswell, remained in the Pact government. The opposing faction, known as "National Council Labour", went into opposition with Madeley as its leader.

After the South African general election, 1929, even though the National Party won an overall majority, Colonel Creswell and a colleague remained ministers. When the National Party formed a coalition with Jan Smuts's South African Party, in 1933, the Pact government came to an end. At the South African general election, 1933, the Creswell faction became followers of General Smuts, thus leaving the National Council faction as the Labour Party.

The National Party and the South African Party merged in 1934 as the United Party (UP). When that party split over the issue of South African participation in the Second World War the Labour Party participated in a wartime coalition under the premiership of Jan Smuts formed in 1939. Walter Madeley, the Labour leader, left the coalition in 1945.

On 24 July 1946, Walter Madeley resigned from the leadership and the party. Three other MPs also left the party during 1946–47 because they favoured a more conservative line on racial questions than the party organisation. Madeley, who had represented Benoni in the Union Parliament continuously since it was created in 1910, died in 1947. A dissident Labour candidate (representing the United Labour Party) contested the Benoni by-election, but lost by 949 votes to the official Labour candidate. Dissident Labour candidates also contested the South African general election, 1948 but won no seats.

After 1939, the Labour Party was closer in political alignment to the United Party (UP) than to the National Party (NP). Labour had an electoral pact with the UP in 1943, 1948 and 1953. However Labour tended to oppose the NP, after it came to power in 1948, more vigorously than the larger and more conservative United Party felt able to do.

The Labour leader, John Christie, died during the South African general election, 1953. His successor, the last Labour leader Alex Hepple, tried to pursue a socialist policy as well as maintaining relations with groups like the African National Congress. His policies proved to be far too left-leaning for the majority Afrikaner-electorate and led a sound defeat in the 1958 election, in which Labour gained 0.23% of the votes and lost all of its remaining seats. The Labour Party was dissolved soon after the election.

A small fraction of former Labour politicians formed the Conservative Workers Party, which only gained 0.31% in the 1961 elections and disbanded as well.

== Leaders ==
- 1910–1933: Colonel F. H. P. Creswell (disputed 1928–1933)
- 1928–1946: Walter Madeley (disputed 1928–1933)
- 1946–1953: John Christie
- 1953–1958: Alex Hepple

== Electoral history ==
=== House of Assembly elections ===
Election	Party leader	Votes	%	Seats	+/–	Position	Result
1910	Frederic Creswell			4 / 121	▲4	▲3rd	Opposition
1915	Frederic Creswell	24,755	9.63%	4 / 130	Steady	▼4th	Opposition
1920	Frederic Creswell	40,639	14.64%	21 / 134	▲17	4th	Opposition
1921	Frederic Creswell	39,406	13.82%	9 / 134	▼12	▲3rd	Opposition
1924	Frederic Creswell	45,380	14.35%	18 / 135	▲9	3rd	Labour Party-NP coalition government
1929	Disputed	33,919	9.86%	8 / 148	▼10	3rd	Labour Party-NP coalition government
1933	Walter Madeley	20,276	6.34%	2 / 150	▼6	▼4th	Opposition
1938	Walter Madeley	48,641	5.87%	3 / 150	▲1	4th	Opposition (joined wartime UP coalition 1939)
1943	Walter Madeley	38,206	4.36%	9 / 150	▲6	▲3rd	wartime UP coalition government (left 1945)
1948	John Christie	27,360	2.57%	6 / 150	▼3	▼4th	Opposition
1953	John Christie	34,730	2.87%	5 / 156	▼1	▲3rd	Opposition
1958	Alex Hepple	2,670	0.23%	0 / 156	▼5	▼5th	Extra-parliamentary

== Bibliography ==
- Keesing's Contemporary Archives
- Smuts: A Reappraisal, by Bernard Friedman (George, Allen & Unwin 1975) ISBN 0-04-920045-3
- South Africa 1982 Official Yearbook of the Republic of South Africa, published by Chris van Rensburg Publications
