= Port Elizabeth Central (House of Assembly of South Africa constituency) =

- Port Elizabeth-Sentraal
- Former constituency for the South African House of Assembly
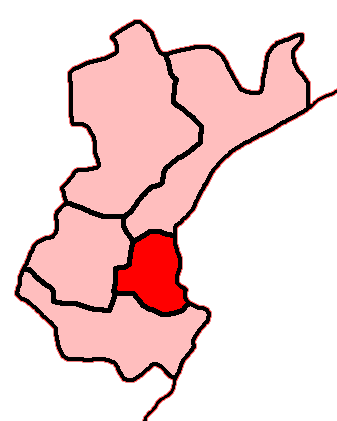
- Location of Port Elizabeth Central within Port Elizabeth (1981)
- Province: Cape of Good Hope
- Electorate: 14,740 (1989)

Former constituency
- Created: 1910
- Abolished: 1994
- Number of members: 1
- Last MHA: Eddie Trent (DP)
- Replaced by: Eastern Cape

Port Elizabeth Central (Afrikaans: Port Elizabeth-Sentraal) was a constituency in the Cape Province of South Africa, which existed from 1910 to 1994. As the name indicates, the seat covered the central area of Port Elizabeth (now Gqeberha). Throughout its existence it elected one member to the House of Assembly and one to the Cape Provincial Council.

== Franchise notes ==
When the Union of South Africa was formed in 1910, the electoral qualifications in use in each pre-existing colony were kept in place. The Cape Colony had implemented a "colour-blind" franchise known as the Cape Qualified Franchise, which included all adult literate men owning more than £75 worth of property (controversially raised from £25 in 1892), and this initially remained in effect after the colony became the Cape Province. As of 1908, 22,784 out of 152,221 electors in the Cape Colony were "Native or Coloured". Eligibility to serve in Parliament and the Provincial Council, however, was restricted to whites from 1910 onward.

The first challenge to the Cape Qualified Franchise came with the Women's Enfranchisement Act, 1930 and the Franchise Laws Amendment Act, 1931, which extended the vote to women and removed property qualifications for the white population only – non-white voters remained subject to the earlier restrictions. In 1936, the Representation of Natives Act removed all black voters from the common electoral roll and introduced three "Native Representative Members", white MPs elected by the black voters of the province and meant to represent their interests in particular. A similar provision was made for Coloured voters with the Separate Representation of Voters Act, 1951, and although this law was challenged by the courts, it went into effect in time for the 1958 general election, which was thus held with all-white voter rolls for the first time in South African history. The all-white franchise would continue until the end of apartheid and the introduction of universal suffrage in 1994.

== History ==
Port Elizabeth Central was the only seat in the Port Elizabeth area to exist continuously from the creation of the Union Parliament in 1910 until the introduction of non-racial universal suffrage in 1994. Through much of its existence, it was a stronghold of the pro-British and liberal side of South African politics, electing a Unionist MP through the entire existence of that party and then South African Party and United Party ones through the entire existence of those parties – with the exception of 1966, when the National Party's Willem Hendrik Delport narrowly took the seat. When the UP collapsed in 1977, Port Elizabeth Central elected D. H. Rossouw from the moderate South African Party. However, in 1981 the seat was won by the more liberal Progressive Federal Party, which would hold it throughout the remainder of its existence.

== Members ==
| Election | Member | Party |
|---|---|---|
| 1910 | E. H. Walton | Unionist |
| 1915 | E. H. Walton | Unionist |
| 1920 | E. H. Walton | Unionist |
| 1921 | E. H. Walton | South African |
| 1921 by | Deneys Reitz | South African |
| 1924 | Deneys Reitz | South African |
| 1929 | A. P. J. Wares | South African |
| 1933 | A. P. J. Wares | South African |
| 1934 | A. P. J. Wares | United |
| 1938 | A. P. J. Wares | United |
| 1943 | A. P. J. Wares | United |
| 1945 by | O. J. Oosthuizen | United |
| 1948 | O. J. Oosthuizen | United |
| 1953 | R. A. P. Trollip | United |
| 1958 | P. R. Dodds | United |
| 1961 | P. R. Dodds | United |
| 1966 | W. H. Delport | National |
| 1970 | H. van C. Cillié | United |
| 1974 | W. G. Kingwell | United |
| 1977 | D. H. Rossouw | South African |
| 1981 | D. J. N. Malcomess | PFP |
| 1987 | D. J. N. Malcomess | PFP |
| 1989 | Eddie Trent | Democratic |
| 1994 | constituency abolished | |

== Detailed results ==
=== Elections in the 1910s ===
General election 1910: Port Elizabeth Central
| Party | Candidate | Votes | % | ±% |
|---|---|---|---|---|
| Unionist | E. H. Walton | Unopposed | | |
| Unionist win (new seat) | | | | |

General election 1915: Port Elizabeth Central
| Party | Candidate | Votes | % | ±% |
|---|---|---|---|---|
| Unionist | E. H. Walton | Unopposed | | |
| Unionist hold | | | | |

=== Elections in the 1920s ===
General election 1920: Port Elizabeth Central
| Party | Candidate | Votes | % | ±% |
|---|---|---|---|---|
| Unionist | E. H. Walton | 1,414 | 69.6 | N/A |
| Labour | R. M. Brown | 619 | 30.4 | New |
| Majority | | 795 | 39.2 | N/A |
| Turnout | | 2,033 | 49.8 | N/A |
| Unionist hold | | Swing | N/A | |

General election 1921: Port Elizabeth Central
| Party | Candidate | Votes | % | ±% |
|---|---|---|---|---|
| South African | E. H. Walton | 1,583 | 80.8 | +11.2 |
| Labour | A. Eaton | 377 | 19.2 | −11.2 |
| Majority | | 1,206 | 61.6 | +22.4 |
| Turnout | | 1,960 | 47.0 | −2.8 |
| South African hold | | Swing | +11.2 | |

Port Elizabeth Central by-election, 15 March 1921
| Party | Candidate | Votes | % | ±% |
|---|---|---|---|---|
| South African | Deneys Reitz | Unopposed | | |
| South African hold | | | | |

General election 1924: Port Elizabeth Central
| Party | Candidate | Votes | % | ±% |
|---|---|---|---|---|
| South African | Deneys Reitz | 1,705 | 70.9 | −9.9 |
| Labour | R. L. Weir | 661 | 27.5 | +8.3 |
| Rejected ballots | | 40 | 1.6 | N/A |
| Majority | | 1,044 | 43.4 | −18.2 |
| Turnout | | 2,406 | 77.4 | +30.4 |
| South African hold | | Swing | -9.1 | |

General election 1929: Port Elizabeth Central
| Party | Candidate | Votes | % | ±% |
|---|---|---|---|---|
| South African | A. P. J. Wares | 2,002 | 64.4 | −6.5 |
| Labour (Creswell) | M. Lazarus | 1,069 | 34.4 | +6.9 |
| Rejected ballots | | 39 | 1.2 | -0.4 |
| Majority | | 933 | 30.0 | −13.4 |
| Turnout | | 3,110 | 72.5 | −4.9 |
| South African hold | | Swing | -6.7 | |

=== Elections in the 1930s ===
General election 1933: Port Elizabeth Central
| Party | Candidate | Votes | % | ±% |
|---|---|---|---|---|
| South African | A. P. J. Wares | 2,953 | 60.8 | −3.6 |
| Independent | L. W. Smith | 1,869 | 38.5 | New |
| Rejected ballots | | 32 | 0.7 | -0.5 |
| Majority | | 1,084 | 38.8 | N/A |
| Turnout | | 4,854 | 57.2 | −15.3 |
| South African hold | | Swing | N/A | |

General election 1938: Port Elizabeth Central
| Party | Candidate | Votes | % | ±% |
|---|---|---|---|---|
| United | A. P. J. Wares | 3,568 | 59.4 | −1.4 |
| Dominion | J. S. Young | 2,385 | 39.7 | New |
| Rejected ballots | | 56 | 0.9 | +0.2 |
| Majority | | 1,183 | 19.7 | N/A |
| Turnout | | 6,009 | 70.4 | +13.2 |
| United hold | | Swing | N/A | |

=== Elections in the 1940s ===
General election 1943: Port Elizabeth Central
| Party | Candidate | Votes | % | ±% |
|---|---|---|---|---|
| United | A. P. J. Wares | Unopposed | | |
| United hold | | | | |

Port Elizabeth Central by-election, 7 March 1945
| Party | Candidate | Votes | % | ±% |
|---|---|---|---|---|
| United | O. J. Oosthuizen | 3,256 | 54.3 | N/A |
| Independent | H. Parker | 2,745 | 45.7 | New |
| Majority | | 511 | 8.6 | N/A |
| Turnout | | 6,001 | 56.3 | N/A |
| United hold | | Swing | N/A | |
