= De Kuilen (House of Assembly of South Africa constituency) =

- Former constituency for the South African House of Assembly
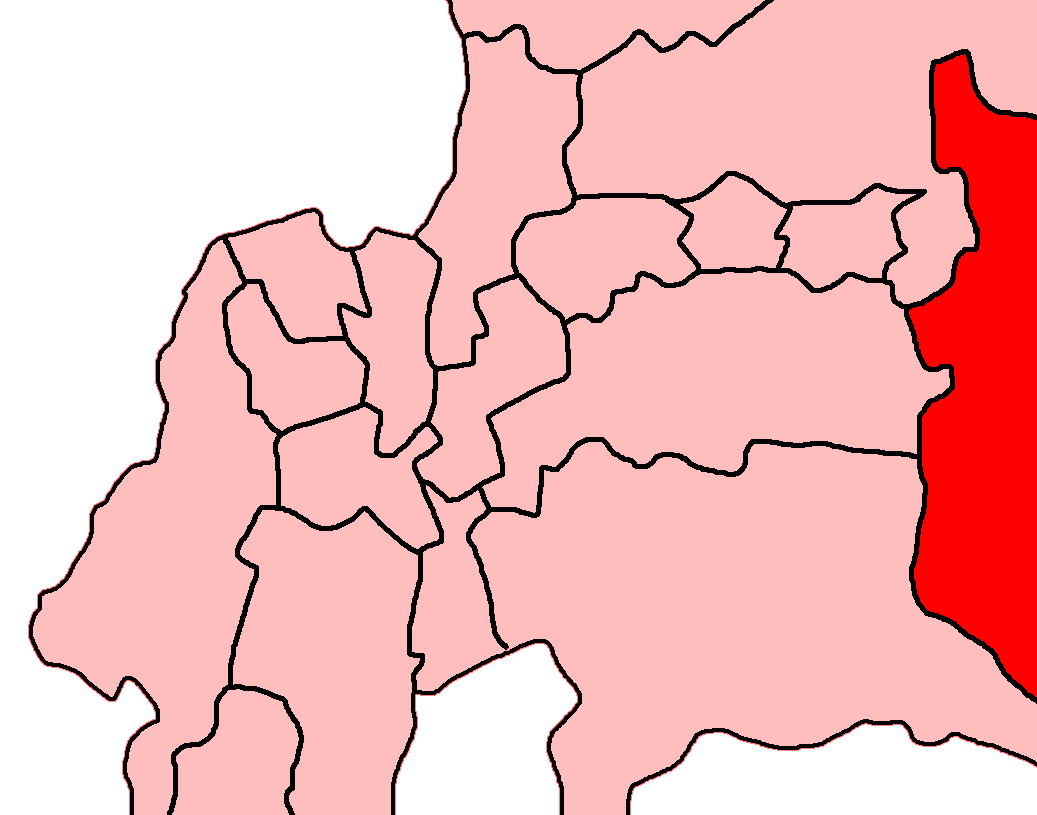
- Location of De Kuilen within Cape Town (1981)
- Province: Cape of Good Hope
- Electorate: 21,078 (1989)

Former constituency
- Created: 1981
- Abolished: 1994
- Number of members: 1
- Last MHA: Myburgh Streicher (NP)
- Replaced by: Western Cape

De Kuilen was a constituency in the Cape Province of South Africa, which existed from 1981 to 1994. Named after the colonial estate of the same name, the seat covered the outermost eastern suburbs of Cape Town, centred on the town of Kuils River. Throughout its existence it elected one member to the House of Assembly and one to the Cape Provincial Council.

== Franchise notes ==
When the Union of South Africa was formed in 1910, the electoral qualifications in use in each pre-existing colony were kept in place. The Cape Colony had implemented a "colour-blind" franchise known as the Cape Qualified Franchise, which included all adult literate men owning more than £75 worth of property (controversially raised from £25 in 1892), and this initially remained in effect after the colony became the Cape Province. As of 1908, 22,784 out of 152,221 electors in the Cape Colony were "Native or Coloured". Eligibility to serve in Parliament and the Provincial Council, however, was restricted to whites from 1910 onward.

The first challenge to the Cape Qualified Franchise came with the Women's Enfranchisement Act, 1930 and the Franchise Laws Amendment Act, 1931, which extended the vote to women and removed property qualifications for the white population only – non-white voters remained subject to the earlier restrictions. In 1936, the Representation of Natives Act removed all black voters from the common electoral roll and introduced three "Native Representative Members", white MPs elected by the black voters of the province and meant to represent their interests in particular. A similar provision was made for Coloured voters with the Separate Representation of Voters Act, 1951, and although this law was challenged by the courts, it went into effect in time for the 1958 general election, which was thus held with all-white voter rolls for the first time in South African history. The all-white franchise would continue until the end of apartheid and the introduction of universal suffrage in 1994.

== History ==
De Kuilen was a short-lived seat, formed in 1981 to represent the growing eastern suburbs of Cape Town. Like most of the region, its electorate was largely Afrikaans-speaking and working-class. Its only MP was Myburgh Streicher, who had formerly been a leader of the conservative wing of the United Party, and then the head of the short-lived South African Party – during his time as MP for De Kuilen, however, he represented the governing National Party, which was very strong in the seat. Unusually for Cape Town, the main opposition in both 1987 and 1989 came from the Conservative Party.

== Members ==
Election	Member	Party
1981	Myburgh Streicher	National
1987	Myburgh Streicher	National
1989	Myburgh Streicher	National
1994	constituency abolished	
