= Newton Park (House of Assembly of South Africa constituency) =

- Former constituency for the South African House of Assembly
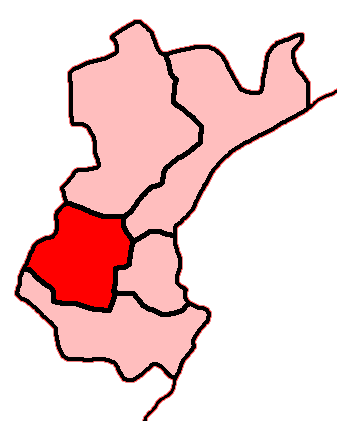
- Location of Newton Park within Port Elizabeth (1981)
- Province: Cape of Good Hope
- Electorate: 18,443 (1989)

Former constituency
- Created: 1966
- Abolished: 1994
- Number of members: 1
- Last MHA: Izak Louw (NP)
- Replaced by: Eastern Cape

Newton Park was a constituency in the Cape Province of South Africa, which existed from 1966 to 1994. It covered the western suburbs of Port Elizabeth (now Gqeberha), centred on its namesake suburb of Newton Park. Throughout its existence it elected one member to the House of Assembly and one to the Cape Provincial Council.

== Franchise notes ==
When the Union of South Africa was formed in 1910, the electoral qualifications in use in each pre-existing colony were kept in place. The Cape Colony had implemented a "colour-blind" franchise known as the Cape Qualified Franchise, which included all adult literate men owning more than £75 worth of property (controversially raised from £25 in 1892), and this initially remained in effect after the colony became the Cape Province. As of 1908, 22,784 out of 152,221 electors in the Cape Colony were "Native or Coloured". Eligibility to serve in Parliament and the Provincial Council, however, was restricted to whites from 1910 onward.

The first challenge to the Cape Qualified Franchise came with the Women's Enfranchisement Act, 1930 and the Franchise Laws Amendment Act, 1931, which extended the vote to women and removed property qualifications for the white population only – non-white voters remained subject to the earlier restrictions. In 1936, the Representation of Natives Act removed all black voters from the common electoral roll and introduced three "Native Representative Members", white MPs elected by the black voters of the province and meant to represent their interests in particular. A similar provision was made for Coloured voters with the Separate Representation of Voters Act, 1951, and although this law was challenged by the courts, it went into effect in time for the 1958 general election, which was thus held with all-white voter rolls for the first time in South African history. The all-white franchise would continue until the end of apartheid and the introduction of universal suffrage in 1994.

== History ==
Newton Park was largely created out of the abolished seat of Port Elizabeth West, and its first MP (the United Party’s Myburgh Streicher) had previously represented that seat. Streicher continued to hold the seat until 1977, becoming known as a stalwart of the UP’s conservative “Old Guard” faction. He rejected the party’s merger into the Progressive Federal Party in 1977, instead forming – and becoming the leader of – the new South African Party. In that year’s general election, the seat fell to the National Party, who would hold it for the entire rest of its existence.

== Members ==
Election	Member	Party
1966	Myburgh Streicher	United
1970	Myburgh Streicher	United
1974	Myburgh Streicher	United
1977	Myburgh Streicher	South African
1977	Willem Hendrik Delport	National
1981	Willem Hendrik Delport	National
1985 by	Izak Louw	National
1987	Izak Louw	National
1989	Izak Louw	National
1994	constituency abolished	
