= Pretoria East (House of Assembly of South Africa constituency) =

South African constituency, 1910–1994

- Pretoria-Oos
- Former constituency for the South African House of Assembly
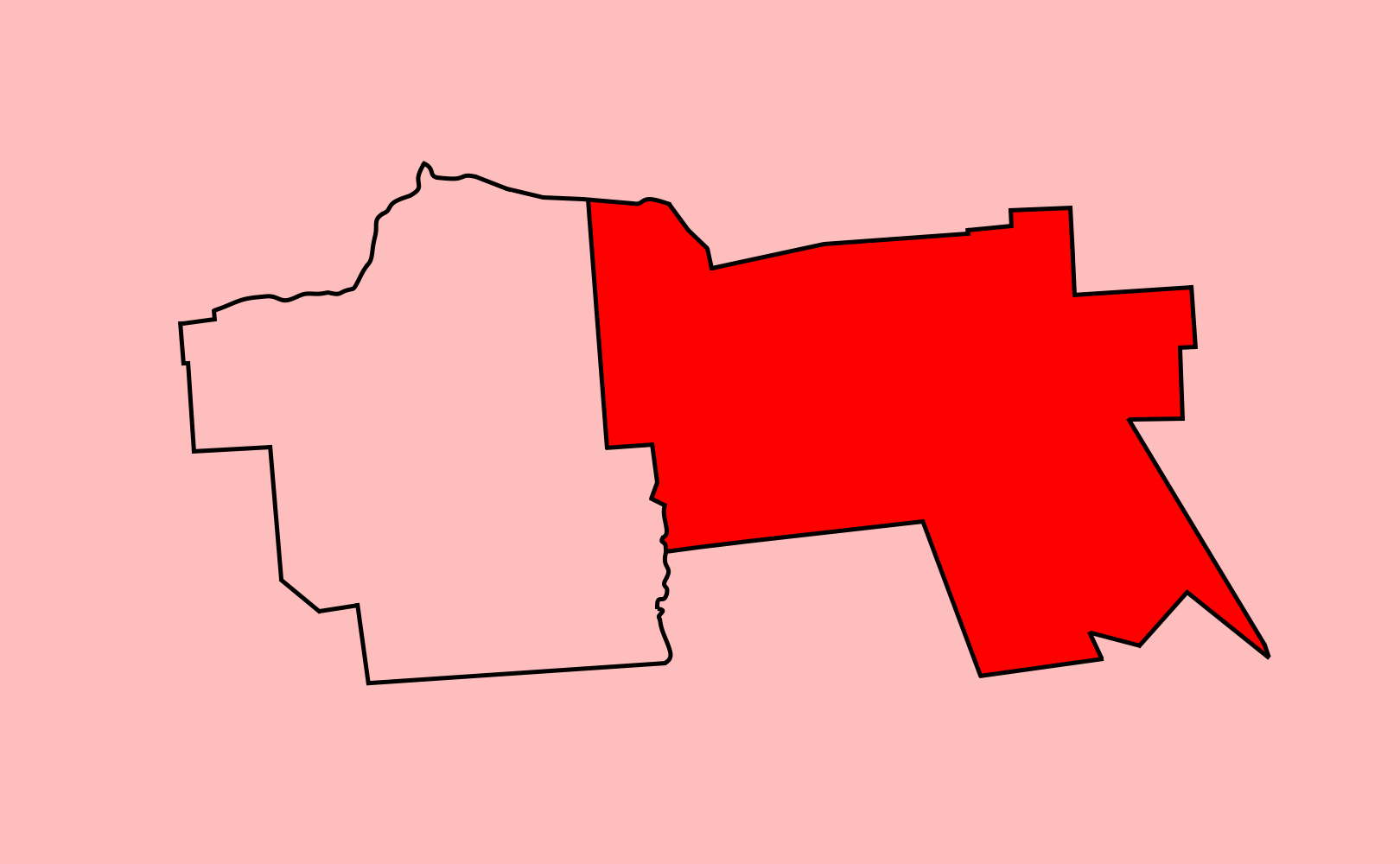
- Location of Pretoria East within Pretoria (1910)
- Province: Transvaal
- Electorate: 38,901 (1989)

Former constituency
- Created: 1910; 1974
- Abolished: 1966; 1994
- Number of members: 1
- Last MHA: Theo Alant (NP)
- Replaced by: Gauteng

Pretoria East (Afrikaans: Pretoria-Oos) was a constituency in the Transvaal Province of South Africa, which existed from 1910 to 1966 and again from 1974 to 1994. It covered the eastern parts of Pretoria, the administrative capital of South Africa, and changed its makeup several times over the course of its existence. Throughout its existence it elected one member to the House of Assembly and one to the Transvaal Provincial Council.

== Franchise notes ==
When the Union of South Africa was formed in 1910, the electoral qualifications in use in each pre-existing colony were kept in place. In the Transvaal Colony, and its predecessor the South African Republic, the vote was restricted to white men, and as such, elections in the Transvaal Province were held on a whites-only franchise from the beginning. The franchise was also restricted by property and education qualifications until the 1933 general election, following the passage of the Women's Enfranchisement Act, 1930 and the Franchise Laws Amendment Act, 1931. From then on, the franchise was given to all white citizens aged 21 or over. Non-whites remained disenfranchised until the end of apartheid and the introduction of universal suffrage in 1994.

== History ==
As initially created, Pretoria East covered the eastern half of its namesake city, and was the only seat in Transvaal outside Johannesburg to be won by the opposition Unionist Party at the first general election in 1910 - this was despite the fact that the governing party candidate was Prime Minister Louis Botha. It changed hands only three times in its history: in 1921, when the Unionist Party merged with the South African Party, in 1934, when the SAP merged into the United Party, and in 1958, when it was won by the National Party. In its final boundaries, delineated in 1981, it covered the outer eastern suburbs of Pretoria, and like other such seats across South Africa, it was an NP stronghold.

== Members ==
Election	Member	Party
1910	J. P. Fitzpatrick	Unionist
1915	J. P. Fitzpatrick	Unionist
1920	C. W. Giovanetti	Unionist
1921	C. W. Giovanetti	South African
1924	C. W. Giovanetti	South African
1929	C. W. Giovanetti	South African
1933	C. W. Giovanetti	South African
1934	C. W. Giovanetti	United Party
1938	C. W. Clark	United Party
1943	C. W. Clark	United Party
1948	C. W. Clark	United Party
1948 by	Jan Smuts	United Party
1950 by	H. C. de Kock	United Party
1953	H. C. de Kock	United Party
1958	Hilgard Muller	National Party
1961 by	J. C. Otto	National Party
1961	J. C. Otto	
1966	constituency abolished	

Election	Member	Party
1974	J. J. Lloyd	National Party
1977	J. J. Lloyd	National Party
1981	Theo Alant	National Party
1987	Theo Alant	National Party
1989	Theo Alant	National Party
1994	constituency abolished	

== Detailed results ==
=== Elections in the 1910s ===
General election 1910: Pretoria East
Party	Candidate	Votes	%	±%
Unionist	J. P. Fitzpatrick	1,231	52.1	New
Het Volk	Louis Botha	1,136	47.9	New
Majority		95	4.2	N/A
Unionist win (new seat)				

General election 1915: Pretoria East
Party	Candidate	Votes	%	±%
Unionist	J. P. Fitzpatrick	1,495	61.3	+9.3
National	K. Rood	644	26.4	New
Labour	A. Grant	292	12.0	New
Independent	R. J. Smith	6	0.2	New
Majority		851	34.9	N/A
Turnout		2,437	76.7	N/A
Unionist hold		Swing	N/A	

=== Elections in the 1920s ===
General election 1920: Pretoria East
Party	Candidate	Votes	%	±%
Unionist	C. W. Giovanetti	1,268	58.7	−2.6
National	W. F. Mondriaan	471	21.8	−4.6
Labour	G. H. McLean	416	19.3	+7.3
Independent	G. L. Hutchinson	5	0.2	New
Majority		797	36.9	+2.0
Turnout		2,160	70.8	−5.9
Unionist hold		Swing	-1.0	

General election 1921: Pretoria East
Party	Candidate	Votes	%	±%
South African	C. W. Giovanetti	1,534	76.3	+17.6
Independent	E. Burgess	476	23.7	New
Majority		1,058	52.6	N/A
Turnout		2,010	64.2	−6.6
South African hold		Swing	N/A	

General election 1924: Pretoria East
Party	Candidate	Votes	%	±%
South African	C. W. Giovanetti	1,489	60.6	−15.7
Labour	E. Burgess	960	39.1	New
Rejected ballots		7	0.3	N/A
Majority		529	21.5	N/A
Turnout		2,456	80.8	+16.6
South African hold		Swing	N/A	

General election 1929: Pretoria East
Party	Candidate	Votes	%	±%
South African	C. W. Giovanetti	1,754	66.9	+6.3
National	H. Toms	860	32.8	New
Rejected ballots		7	0.3	+-0
Majority		894	34.1	N/A
Turnout		2,621	80.2	−0.6
South African hold		Swing	N/A	

=== Elections in the 1930s ===
General election 1933: Pretoria East
Party	Candidate	Votes	%	±%
South African	C. W. Giovanetti	3,695	76.6	+9.7
Roos	A. Davis	1,090	22.6	New
Rejected ballots		37	0.8	+0.5
Majority		2,605	54.0	N/A
Turnout		4,822	68.0	−12.2
South African hold		Swing	N/A	

General election 1938: Pretoria East
Party	Candidate	Votes	%	±%
United	C. W. Clark	3,926	74.5	−2.1
Independent	G. H. Wilsenach	1,323	25.1	New
Rejected ballots		18	0.4	-0.4
Majority		2,603	49.4	N/A
Turnout		5,267	71.2	+3.2
United hold		Swing	N/A	
