= South African Party (disambiguation) =

South African Party was a political party in the Union of South Africa from 1911 to 1934.

South African Party may also refer to:

- South African Party (Cape Colony), a political party in the Cape Colony, which existed until the formation of the Union of South Africa in 1910. It governed Cape Colony between 1908 until the creation of the Union of South Africa.
- South African Party (1977), a political party in the Republic of South Africa from 1977 to 1980
