= Algoa =

Algoa may refer to:

- Algoa, Texas, an unincorporated community in Galveston County, Texas, United States
- Algoa Bay, a wide inlet along the South African east coast
- Algoa (House of Assembly of South Africa constituency), a former constituency in Cape Province
- Algoa FM, a Commercial radio station
- 1394 Algoa, an asteroid
