= Caledon (House of Assembly of South Africa constituency) =

- Former constituency for the South African House of Assembly
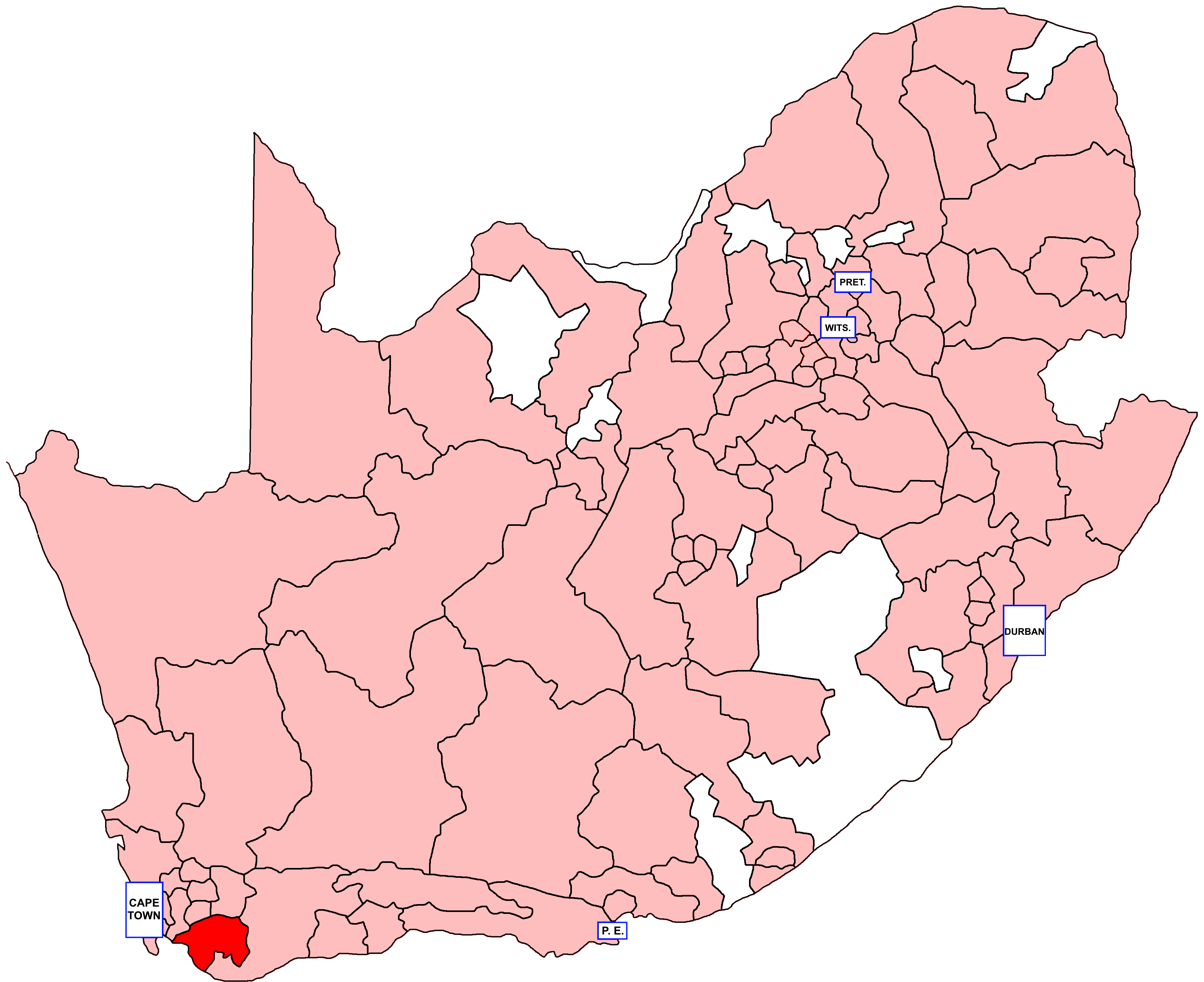
- Location of Caledon within South Africa (1981)
- Province: Cape of Good Hope
- Electorate: 14,033(1989)

Former constituency
- Created: 1910; 1966
- Abolished: 1958; 1994
- Number of members: 1
- Last MHA: L. H. Fick (NP)
- Replaced by: Western Cape (1994)

Caledon, known as Caledon-Bredasdorp for the 1953 election, was a constituency in the Cape Province of South Africa, which existed from 1910 to 1958 and again from 1966 until 1994. Named after the town of Caledon, it covered part of the Overberg region. Throughout its existence it elected one member to the House of Assembly and one to the Cape Provincial Council.

== Franchise notes ==
When the Union of South Africa was formed in 1910, the electoral qualifications in use in each pre-existing colony were kept in place. The Cape Colony had implemented a “colour-blind” franchise known as the Cape Qualified Franchise, which included all adult literate men owning more than £75 worth of property (controversially raised from £25 in 1892), and this initially remained in effect after the colony became the Cape Province. As of 1908, 22,784 out of 152,221 electors in the Cape Colony were “Native or Coloured”. Eligibility to serve in Parliament and the Provincial Council, however, was restricted to whites from 1910 onward.

The first challenge to the Cape Qualified Franchise came with the Women's Enfranchisement Act, 1930 and the Franchise Laws Amendment Act, 1931, which extended the vote to women and removed property qualifications for the white population only – non-white voters remained subject to the earlier restrictions. In 1936, the Representation of Natives Act removed all black voters from the common electoral roll and introduced three “Native Representative Members”, white MPs elected by the black voters of the province and meant to represent their interests in particular. A similar provision was made for Coloured voters with the Separate Representation of Voters Act, 1951, and although this law was challenged by the courts, it went into effect in time for the 1958 general election, which was thus held with all-white voter rolls for the first time in South African history. The all-white franchise would continue until the end of apartheid and the introduction of universal suffrage in 1994.

== History ==
Like many rural constituencies across the Cape, Caledon had a largely Afrikaans-speaking electorate. Throughout its existence, it only changed hands twice – in 1934, when the South African Party merged into the United Party, and in 1953, when the UP lost the seat to the ascendant National Party. Its first MP, Joel Krige, was the uncle-in-law of Jan Smuts and represented the seat until his death in 1933, serving as Speaker of the House of Assembly between 1915 and 1924. The seat became marginal after Krige's death, seeing several strong contests by the National Party and nearly falling to them in 1948. In 1953, with the creation of False Bay and the abolition of Bredasdorp, the newly rechristened Caledon-Bredasdorp became a significantly more rural constituency, and this was enough to secure it for former Bredasdorp MP Dirk Uys. In 1958, the seat was split between False Bay and Hottentots Holland, and Uys moved to the former seat.

In its second iteration, from 1966 to 1994, Caledon was a safe seat for the National Party. The recreated seat's first MP was Frank Waring, former Springboks rugby player and one of few English-speakers in the cabinet of Hendrik Verwoerd. Waring retired from politics in 1972, but the seat remained safe for the NP, going unopposed for much of the 1970s and seeing only weak contests by the liberal opposition in the 1980s.

== Members ==
Election	Member	Party
1910	Joel Krige	South African
1915	Joel Krige	South African
1920	Joel Krige	South African
1921	Joel Krige	South African
1924	Joel Krige	South African
1929	Joel Krige	South African
1933	Joel Krige	South African
1933 by	H. C. de Wet	South African
1934	H. C. de Wet	United
1938	H. C. de Wet	United
1943	H. C. de Wet	United
1946 by	G. S. P. Delport	United
1948	G. S. P. Delport	United
1953	D. C. H. Uys	National
1958	constituency abolished	

Election	Member	Party
1966	Frank Waring	National
1970	Frank Waring	National
1972 by	L. A. P. A. Munnik	National
1974	L. A. P. A. Munnik	National
1977	J. D. de Villiers	National
1981	L. H. Fick	National
1987	L. H. Fick	National
1989	L. H. Fick	National
1994	constituency abolished	

== Detailed results ==
=== Elections in the 1910s ===
General election 1910: Caledon
Party	Candidate	Votes	%	±%
South African	Joel Krige	Unopposed		
South African win (new seat)				

General election 1915: Caledon
Party	Candidate	Votes	%	±%
South African	Joel Krige	1,652	64.0	N/A
National	P. J. Cillié	928	36.0	New
Majority		724	28.0	N/A
Turnout		2,580	85.1	N/A
South African hold		Swing	N/A	

=== Elections in the 1920s ===
General election 1920: Caledon
Party	Candidate	Votes	%	±%
South African	Joel Krige	1,696	59.8	−4.2
National	M. G. Viljoen	1,141	40.2	+4.2
Majority		555	19.6	−8.4
Turnout		2,837	80.2	−4.9
South African hold		Swing	-4.2	

General election 1921: Caledon
Party	Candidate	Votes	%	±%
South African	Joel Krige	1,833	62.5	+2.7
National	P. J. Cillié	1,102	37.5	−2.7
Majority		731	25.0	+5.4
Turnout		2,935	80.7	+0.5
South African hold		Swing	+2.7	

General election 1924: Caledon
Party	Candidate	Votes	%	±%
South African	Joel Krige	1,906	58.7	−3.8
National	F. W. Beyers	1,313	40.4	+2.9
Rejected ballots		31	0.9	N/A
Majority		593	18.3	−6.7
Turnout		3,250	88.2	+7.5
South African hold		Swing	-3.4	

General election 1929: Caledon
Party	Candidate	Votes	%	±%
South African	Joel Krige	1,741	52.1	−6.6
National	M. G. Viljoen	1,564	46.8	+6.6
Rejected ballots		35	0.9	+-0
Majority		177	5.3	−13.0
Turnout		3,340	91.3	+3.9
South African hold		Swing	-6.5	

=== Elections in the 1930s ===
General election 1933: Caledon
Party	Candidate	Votes	%	±%
South African	Joel Krige	Unopposed		
South African hold				

Caledon by-election, 25 September 1933
Party	Candidate	Votes	%	±%
South African	H. C. de Wet	Unopposed		
South African hold				

General election 1938: Caledon
Party	Candidate	Votes	%	±%
United	H. C. de Wet	3,638	56.2	N/A
Purified National	L. H. Fick	2,793	43.2	New
Rejected ballots		39	0.6	N/A
Majority		845	13.1	N/A
Turnout		6,470	94.2	N/A
United hold		Swing	N/A	

=== Elections in the 1940s ===
General election 1943: Caledon
Party	Candidate	Votes	%	±%
United	H. C. de Wet	4,401	57.2	+0.6
Reunited National	J. H. O. du Plessis	3,289	42.8	−0.6
Majority		1,112	14.4	+1.2
Turnout		7,690	88.7	−5.0
United hold		Swing	+0.6	

Caledon by-election, 6 March 1946
Party	Candidate	Votes	%	±%
United	G. S. P. Delport	4,326	52.7	−4.5
Reunited National	L. H. Fick	3,880	47.3	+4.5
Majority		446	5.4	−9.0
Turnout		8,206	86.9	−1.8
United hold		Swing	-4.5	

General election 1948: Caledon
Party	Candidate	Votes	%	±%
United	G. S. P. Delport	4,521	50.6	−6.6
Reunited National	J. C. de C. Louw	4,410	49.4	+6.6
Majority		111	1.2	−13.2
Turnout		8,931	91.6	+2.9
United hold		Swing	-6.6	
