= Pieter Voltelyn Graham van der Byl =

South African politician and soldier

The Honourable Major Pieter Voltelyn Graham van der Byl MC
- Constituency: Bredasdorp and Green Point

Personal details
- Born: 21 February 1889 Caledon, Cape Colony (now South Africa)
- Died: 21 January 1975 (aged 85) Muizenberg, Cape Province, South Africa
- Party: South African Party and United Party
- Spouse: Joyce Clare Fleming
- Children: Pieter Kenyon van der Byl b. 1923 and William van der Byl b.1925

Major Pieter Voltelyn Graham "P. V." van der Byl MC (21 February 1889 – 21 January 1975) was a South African soldier and statesman. In South African politics, he was a member of the liberal South African Party and then the United Party from 1929 to 1966 and a member of Jan Smuts' cabinet from 1939 to 1948, during which time, he was minister of Native Affairs. Major Piet (as he was commonly known) was a chevalier de la Légion d'Honneur, Honorary Colonel of the University of Cape Town Regiment, as well as receiving the Military Cross and the King George VI Coronation Medal.

== Family history and early life ==
The first Van der Byl to arrive in the Cape was Gerrit van der Byl (from Overschie, Dutch Republic) in 1668. Over the centuries, the Van der Byls became powerful landowners by acquiring estates such as: Vredenberg, Klavervlei, Joostenberg, De Leeuwenhoek, Welmoed, Spier, Fairfield (where the family still resides) and Groote Schuur (the current residence of the president of South Africa and the estate came into the family's possession from Hester Anne Myburgh. It was later sold to Cecil John Rhodes).

Born on 21 February 1889 in Caledon, Cape Colony, van der Byl was the youngest of Adelaide Taylor and Tim van der Byl's four children. His father chose to educate his children locally, instead of sending them abroad, so van der Byl attended Diocesan College, in Cape Town, and then continued the family tradition of studying at Pembroke College, Cambridge. He fared feebly at school due to serious illness, however when he went to Cambridge, van der Byl excelled at rowing, partaking several times in the Oxford-Cambridge boat race and in his final year he received a Blue, becoming possibly the first South African to do so for rowing.

== Military career ==
After completing a master's degree in agriculture, van der Byl returned to the Cape with the intention of farming. However, he received a letter in 1911 from General Methuen who needed the aid of someone with local expertise for the forthcoming maneuvers in the Caledon area, after which van der Byl was asked to enlist in an officer's course in the newly formed Union Defence Force by General Jan Smuts. Many of his colleagues on the staff were former enemies from the Boer and British armies, some of which were destined to clash again in the Maritz Rebellion of 1914.

At the outbreak of World War I, van der Byl served with distinction under Generals Jan Smuts and Louis Botha in the Maritz Rebellion, German South-West Africa campaign and the East-Africa Campaign (where he caught malaria that would severely affect his health for the rest of his life). In East Africa, van der Byl was appointed staff captain to General Smuts. He was often used to negotiate with the German Army (under the command of the formidable General: who, with only 3000 German Officers and several thousand local Askaris, would keep the South African and British forces at bay for the duration of the War). During this time, van der Byl frequently called on an old family acquaintance and famed big game hunter, F C Selous, and would be one of the last people to see him before his assassination.

Since there was little left for him to do in East Africa, van der Byl managed to secure a transfer to the Western Front, where he joined the RAF. The war however drew to a close before van der Byl was able to complete his training. For his efforts during the war, van der Byl was made a chevalier de la Légion d'honneur by the French Government and he was invited to Buckingham Palace to receive the Military Cross.

== Farming and politics ==
The conclusion of the war in Europe signalled a return to a more quiet life of living between England and running the family estates in South Africa. Back in South Africa, van der Byl by chance met Field Marshal Sir Douglas Haig, and the two immediately struck up a close, lifelong friendship.

In 1922, he married Joyce Clare (née Fleming), a Scottish woman and daughter of the physician and magistrate Lieut.-Col. Samuel Fleming and his wife Elizabeth Knox Clare (née Ball). He had known Joyce since the end of the war. After a meeting with General Smuts that year, Smuts persuaded van der Byl to continue to serve under him in an official capacity in the Ministry of Defence. In 1923, van der Byl's first son, P K van der Byl, was born and in 1925 his wife had a second son, William. In 1928, van der Byl decided to begin a career in politics. Campaigning for the South African Party, van der Byl was elected candidate for Bredasdorp in 1929.

== Minister ==
When Smuts became Prime Minister in 1939, van der Byl attained a post in the cabinet and was minister-without-portfolio. Van der Byl was a flamboyant and an entertaining character, known for witty sense of humour and always being extremely elegantly dressed (he was voted best dressed parliamentarian several times). During the War years, amongst other duties, van der Byl was attending minister to the exiled Greek royal family. He became closely befriended with them and they often visited his home, Fairfield. One of King Paul's daughters, Irene, was born in Cape Town and his other daughter, Sophia, would later marry Juan Carlos of Spain and become Queen of Spain.

In 1943, van der Byl became Minister of Native Affairs (a name which he particularly disliked). This was a monumental task as there was a growing sentiment against the African population amongst the lower class white population, who feared that they would lose their jobs to cheaper African labour, and the opposing view of Smuts and his supporters, who believed in gradual liberation of the African and non-white population. Although Smuts had used segregation in the past as a method of stemming rapid urbanisation and for other political reasons, his government's view on "issues of native affairs" was clear: they believed that Africans had the right to be permanent citizens and that segregation was not the way forward: this was highlighted in a speech which he gave in 1942 "segregation had failed to solve the Native problem of Africa and that the concept of trusteeship offered the only prospect of happy relations between European and African". Van der Byl was in accord with Smuts' beliefs, which were in complete contrast with the National Party's ideas.

In 1948, van der Byl was requested to crown the new Zulu King, Cyprian Bhekuzulu kaSolomon (father of the current King, Goodwill Zwelithini kaBhekuzulu), to which van der Byl chose the hymn Nkosi Sikelel' iAfrika to be played at the coronation, which forms part of South Africa's current National Anthem.

== In opposition ==
As a result of Smuts' and van der Byl's views, not only did the South African Party government lose the June 1948 general election to the National Party (who would start and continue Apartheid in South Africa for the next 46 years), but they lost their own seats in their respective constituencies. However, van der Byl managed to win the seat for Green Point (a suburb of Cape Town) in October of that year. Van der Byl kept his seat in Green Point until his retirement in 1966.

During his later years in opposition, van der Byl was a very popular and respected figure by both opposition and government. In parliament, a National Party politician asked the speaker of the house if they could refer to van der Byl as "Oom Piet" (which is an Afrikaans term of respect, meaning "uncle Piet"), this was duly granted and van der Byl was henceforth known as "Oom Piet" in parliament and in the media.

During his years in opposition, van der Byl's views on National Party government policy never changed, he vehemently continued to openly criticise the Apartheid regime for its extreme suppression of the non-white population and its transformation of South Africa into a republic. He especially sympathised with the Coloured community of the Cape, who had been highly respected by the South African government before 1948. Certain members of the community had been given the right to vote since the days of the Cape Colony. The National Party stripped them of this, and many other rights which outraged van der Byl.

Although van der Byl opposed segregation and the oppression of the Black population, van der Byl did not believe in majority rule. He believed that the tragedies that occurred in African nations after independence, such as the Congo Massacres and the widespread rapid degeneration of most states, was a result of the African population not being prepared for independence and the colonial powers relinquishing power too quickly.

Van der Byl was a supporter of Rhodesia, where he feared that independence would lead to disaster. He was also critical of the British Government's decision to place sanctions on South Africa and Rhodesia, as he believed that the Rhodesians and South Africans had loyally come to the aid of Britain during the World Wars, both militarily and financially.

Despite his popularity, he made enemies with key National Party figures such as Vorster, Strijdom and Verwoerd (a National Party extremist and the "Architect of Apartheid"), due to his outspoken attacks on their policies, which he saw as politically and socially catastrophic to the future of South Africa. The hatred towards van der Byl from certain South African politicians would later be evident as they would refuse to deal with his son P. K. van der Byl, when P. K. became a minister in Rhodesia. However, in van der Byl's case, the dislike with the National Party extremists was mutual, and he later bought the bench on which Verwoerd was murdered.

In 1966, after creating an uproar in the parliament for harshly voicing his opinion on a government policy, he was asked to leave the parliament for the session by the speaker. Van der Byl (aged 77) considered that it was enough after 37 years of politics and retired.

== Retirement ==
It was the end of an era for South African politics, as van der Byl had been one of the few politicians to be born in the colonial era and to see the transition of aftermath of the Boer War to the full-blown implementation of Apartheid.

In his retirement, van der Byl became a director of South African insurance giant, Old Mutual, and he wrote a three-volume autobiography: Playgrounds to Battlefields; Top hat to Veldtskoon and The Shadows Lengthen.

Van der Byl was offered several times a baronetcy by King George VI, but Smuts refused as he insisted that South Africans did not require titles.

== Private life ==
Van der Byl and wife were prominent in English society. They were closely befriended with members of the military establishment and the Royal Family. He would often be presented in court and he accompanied the Royal Family on their official tour of South Africa in 1947. During the 1947 tour, he arranged Princess Elizabeth's 21st birthday party in the Mount Nelson Hotel.

Van der Byl was an avid sportsman (hunting, shooting, fishing and riding) and he would often spend his holidays shooting with his sons in Rhodesia and other parts of Africa. He was known to be a superb rifle shot.

He and his wife had two sons: P. K. van der Byl (who became a minister in Rhodesia) and William van der Byl (who became a director of AECI in South Africa).
