= Bredasdorp (House of Assembly of South Africa constituency) =

- Former constituency for the South African House of Assembly
- Province: Cape of Good Hope
- Electorate: 9,501 (1948)

Former constituency
- Created: 1929
- Abolished: 1953
- Number of members: 1
- Last MHA: D. C. H. Uys (NP)
- Replaced by: Caledon-Bredasdorp

Bredasdorp was a constituency in the Cape Province of South Africa, which existed from 1929 to 1953. Named after the town of Bredasdorp, it covered the eastern part of the Overberg region. Throughout its existence it elected one member to the House of Assembly and one to the Cape Provincial Council.

== Franchise notes ==
When the Union of South Africa was formed in 1910, the electoral qualifications in use in each pre-existing colony were kept in place. The Cape Colony had implemented a “colour-blind” franchise known as the Cape Qualified Franchise, which included all adult literate men owning more than £75 worth of property (controversially raised from £25 in 1892), and this initially remained in effect after the colony became the Cape Province. As of 1908, 22,784 out of 152,221 electors in the Cape Colony were “Native or Coloured”. Eligibility to serve in Parliament and the Provincial Council, however, was restricted to whites from 1910 onward.

The first challenge to the Cape Qualified Franchise came with the Women's Enfranchisement Act, 1930 and the Franchise Laws Amendment Act, 1931, which extended the vote to women and removed property qualifications for the white population only – non-white voters remained subject to the earlier restrictions. In 1936, the Representation of Natives Act removed all black voters from the common electoral roll and introduced three “Native Representative Members”, white MPs elected by the black voters of the province and meant to represent their interests in particular. A similar provision was made for Coloured voters with the Separate Representation of Voters Act, 1951, and although this law was challenged by the courts, it went into effect in time for the 1958 general election, which was thus held with all-white voter rolls for the first time in South African history. The all-white franchise would continue until the end of apartheid and the introduction of universal suffrage in 1994.

== History ==
Like many rural constituencies across the Cape, Bredasdorp had a largely Afrikaans-speaking electorate. It was a bellwether seat, being held by the governing party throughout its existence, and tended to be closely fought between the United and National parties. Its first MP was P. V. van der Byl, a World War I veteran and associate of Jan Smuts who served in cabinet throughout Smuts’ second premiership. In his role as Minister for Native Affairs, van der Byl was an opponent of racial segregation, and this stance lost both the UP and him personally the 1948 general election. Bredasdorp's new MP was D. C. H. Uys, who would also serve as a cabinet minister. Uys came with the seat on its merger with Caledon in 1953, and went on to represent False Bay until 1970.

== Members ==
Election	Member	Party
1929	P. V. van der Byl	South African
1933	P. V. van der Byl	South African
1934	P. V. van der Byl	United
1938	P. V. van der Byl	United
1943	P. V. van der Byl	United
1948	D. C. H. Uys	HNP
1953	constituency abolished	

== Detailed results ==
=== Elections in the 1920s ===
General election 1929: Bredasdorp
Party	Candidate	Votes	%	±%
South African	P. V. van der Byl	1,776	59.5	New
National	A. J. de Waal	1,175	39.3	New
Rejected ballots		35	1.2	N/A
Majority		601	20.2	N/A
Turnout		2,986	90.1	N/A
South African win (new seat)				

=== Elections in the 1930s ===
General election 1933: Bredasdorp
Party	Candidate	Votes	%	±%
South African	P. V. van der Byl	Unopposed		
South African hold				

General election 1938: Bredasdorp
Party	Candidate	Votes	%	±%
United	P. V. van der Byl	3,950	54.8	N/A
Purified National	M. J. Streicher	3,176	44.0	New
Rejected ballots		85	1.2	N/A
Majority		774	10.7	N/A
Turnout		7,211	92.4	N/A
United hold		Swing	N/A	

=== Elections in the 1940s ===
General election 1943: Bredasdorp
Party	Candidate	Votes	%	±%
United	P. V. van der Byl	4,326	56.9	+1.5
Reunited National	P. K. Le Roux	3,280	43.1	−1.5
Majority		1,046	13.8	+3.0
Turnout		7,606	90.3	−1.0
United hold		Swing	+1.5	

General election 1948: Bredasdorp
Party	Candidate	Votes	%	±%
Reunited National	D. C. H. Uys	4,464	51.5	+8.4
United	P. V. van der Byl	4,205	48.5	−8.4
Majority		259	3.0	N/A
Turnout		8,669	91.2	+0.9
Reunited National gain from United		Swing	+8.4	
