= Walvis Bay (House of Assembly of South Africa constituency) =

Constituency in South Africa

- Walvisbaai
- Former constituency for the South African House of Assembly
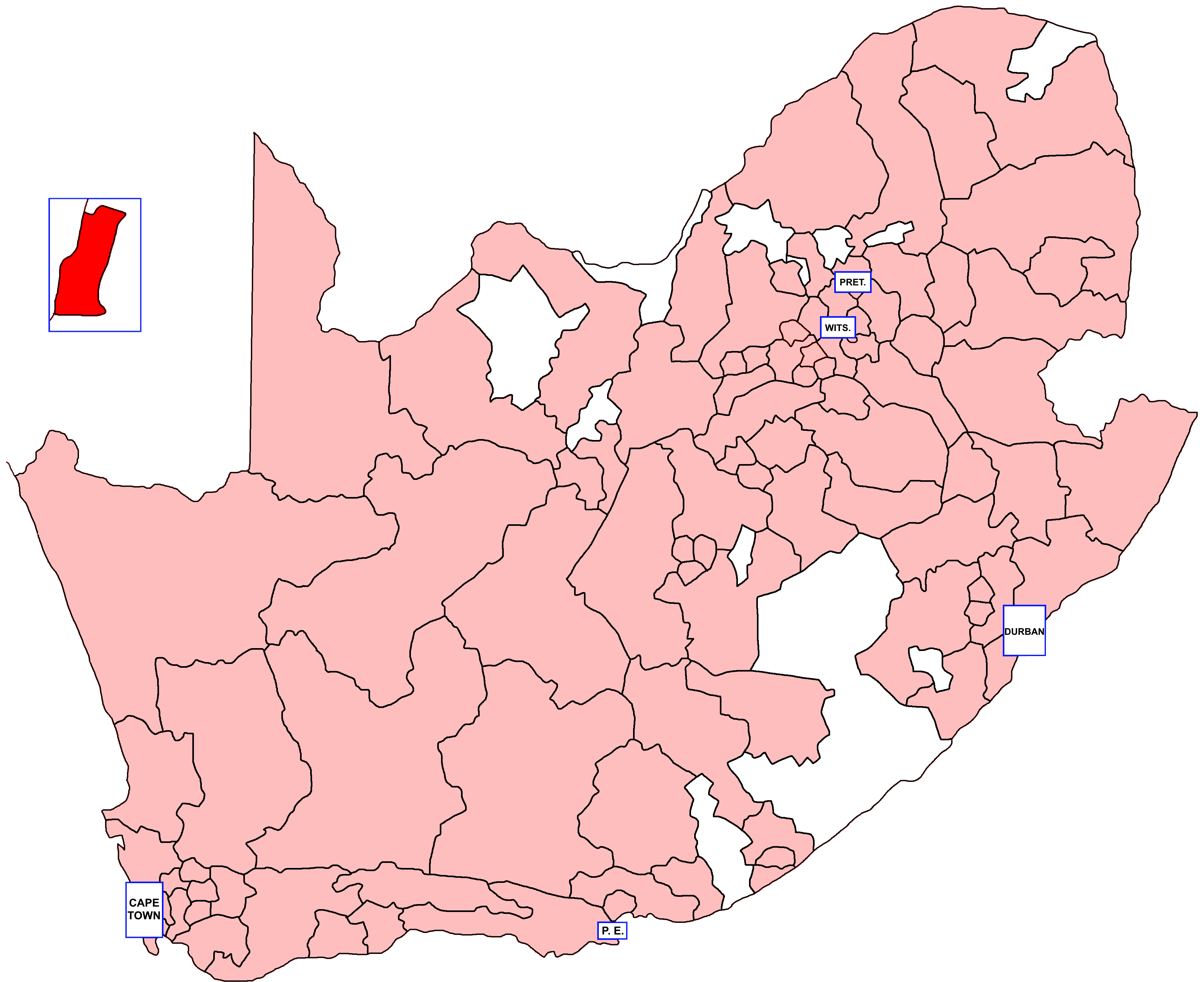
- Location of Walvis Bay within South Africa (1987)
- Province: Cape of Good Hope
- Electorate: 4,979 (1989)

Former constituency
- Created: 1987
- Abolished: 1994
- Number of members: 1
- Last MHA: C. L. de Jager (NP)
- Created from: Green Point
- Replaced by: Namibia

Walvis Bay (Afrikaans: Walvisbaai) was a constituency in the Cape Province of South Africa, which existed from 1982 to 1994. It covered the Walvis Bay territory, an exclave of the Cape inside South West Africa (the future Namibia). Throughout its existence it elected one member to the House of Assembly.

== Franchise notes ==
When the Union of South Africa was formed in 1910, the electoral qualifications in use in each pre-existing colony were kept in place. The Cape Colony had implemented a “colour-blind” franchise known as the Cape Qualified Franchise, which included all adult literate men owning more than £75 worth of property (controversially raised from £25 in 1892), and this initially remained in effect after the colony became the Cape Province. As of 1908, 22,784 out of 152,221 electors in the Cape Colony were “Native or Coloured”. Eligibility to serve in Parliament and the provincial council, however, was restricted to whites from 1910 onward.

The first challenge to the Cape Qualified Franchise came with the Women's Enfranchisement Act, 1930 and the Franchise Laws Amendment Act, 1931, which extended the vote to women and removed property qualifications for the white population only – non-white voters remained subject to the earlier restrictions. In 1936, the Representation of Natives Act removed all black voters from the common electoral roll and introduced three “Native Representative Members”, white MPs elected by the black voters of the province and meant to represent their interests in particular. A similar provision was made for Coloured voters with the Separate Representation of Voters Act, 1951, and although this law was challenged by the courts, it went into effect in time for the 1958 general election, which was thus held with all-white voter rolls for the first time in South African history. The all-white franchise would continue until the end of apartheid and the introduction of universal suffrage in 1994.

== History ==
Although surrounded by German South West Africa, Walvis Bay had been part of the Cape Colony since 1884, and so became part of the Cape Province upon the formation of the Union of South Africa in 1910. However, from 1922 to 1977, it was administered as part of the South African League of Nations mandate of South West Africa. During this period, it was first unrepresented in the Union Parliament, and then (from 1950) represented as part of South West Africa's parliamentary delegation. When the mandate transitioned to majority rule in the 1970s, South Africa reasserted control over Walvis Bay, transferring it back to the Cape Province and its voters to the constituency of Green Point, which also included Cape Town's harbour. However, in 1982, it was split off to form a separate constituency – with less than five thousand voters, it was the smallest constituency in South Africa by far.

South West Africa's white electorate had always been strongly supportive of the National Party, and this was true of Walvis Bay as well. The governing party held the seat throughout its existence, facing opposition only from the Conservative Party and the Herstigte Nasionale Party, both hardline pro-apartheid. With the transfer of the Walvis Bay territory to Namibia on 1 March 1994, two months before the first non-racial general election in South Africa's history, the constituency was abolished.

== Members ==
| Election | Member | Party |
|---|---|---|
| 1982 by | M. C. Bothma | National |
| 1987 | M. C. Bothma | National |
| 1989 | C. L. de Jager | National |
| 1994 | constituency abolished | |

== Detailed results ==
=== Elections in the 1980s ===
Walvis Bay by-election, 3 November 1982
| Party | Candidate | Votes | % | ±% |
|---|---|---|---|---|
| National | M. C. Botma | 1,792 | 70.2 | New |
| Conservative | P. J. Joubert | 606 | 23.8 | New |
| Herstigte Nasionale Party | A. S. Treurnicht | 153 | 6.0 | New |
| Majority | | 1,186 | 46.5 | N/A |
| Turnout | | 2,551 | 72.0 | N/A |
| National win (new seat) | | | | |

General election 1987: Walvis Bay
| Party | Candidate | Votes | % | ±% |
|---|---|---|---|---|
| National | M. C. Bothma | 1,782 | 73.5 | +3.3 |
| Conservative | H. J. van der Walt | 642 | 26.5 | +2.7 |
| Majority | | 1,140 | 47.0 | +0.5 |
| Turnout | | 2,424 | 52.7 | −19.3 |
| National hold | | Swing | N/A | |

General election 1989: Walvis Bay
| Party | Candidate | Votes | % | ±% |
|---|---|---|---|---|
| National | C. L. de Jager | 1,868 | 66.1 | −7.4 |
| Conservative | D. H. Mostert | 956 | 33.9 | +7.4 |
| Majority | | 1,140 | 32.2 | −14.8 |
| Turnout | | 2,824 | 57.2 | +5.1 |
| National hold | | Swing | -7.4 | |
