= Namaqualand (House of Assembly of South Africa constituency) =

South African constituency, 1910–1994

- Namakwaland
- Former constituency for the South African House of Assembly
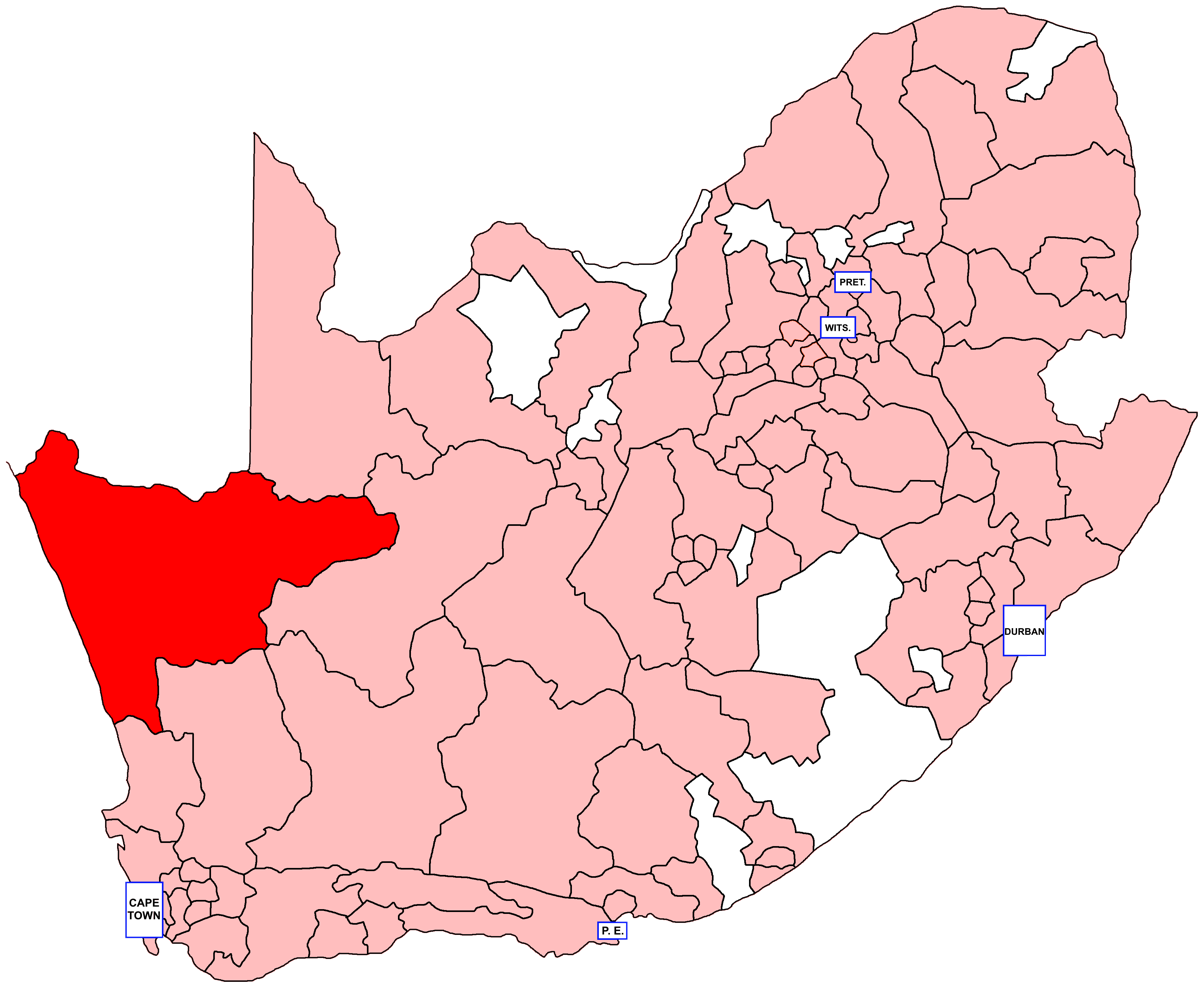
- Location of Namaqualand within South Africa (1981)
- Province: Cape of Good Hope
- Electorate: 9,947 (1989)

Former constituency
- Created: 1910
- Abolished: 1994
- Number of members: 1
- Last MHA: E. van der Merwe Louw (NP)
- Replaced by: Northern Cape

Namaqualand (Afrikaans: Namakwaland) was a constituency in the Cape Province of South Africa, which existed from 1910 to 1994. The constituency covered much of the Namaqualand region of the Northern Cape, and was centred on the town of Springbok. Throughout its existence it elected one member to the House of Assembly and one to the Cape Provincial Council.

== Franchise notes ==
When the Union of South Africa was formed in 1910, the electoral qualifications in use in each pre-existing colony were kept in place. The Cape Colony had implemented a “colour-blind” franchise known as the Cape Qualified Franchise, which included all adult literate men owning more than £75 worth of property (controversially raised from £25 in 1892), and this initially remained in effect after the colony became the Cape Province. As of 1908, 22,784 out of 152,221 electors in the Cape Colony were “Native or Coloured”. Eligibility to serve in Parliament and the Provincial Council, however, was restricted to whites from 1910 onward.

The first challenge to the Cape Qualified Franchise came with the Women's Enfranchisement Act, 1930 and the Franchise Laws Amendment Act, 1931, which extended the vote to women and removed property qualifications for the white population only – non-white voters remained subject to the earlier restrictions. In 1936, the Representation of Natives Act removed all black voters from the common electoral roll and introduced three “Native Representative Members”, white MPs elected by the black voters of the province and meant to represent their interests in particular. A similar provision was made for Coloured voters with the Separate Representation of Voters Act, 1951, and although this law was challenged by the courts, it went into effect in time for the 1958 general election, which was thus held with all-white voter rolls for the first time in South African history. The all-white franchise would continue until the end of apartheid and the introduction of universal suffrage in 1994.

== History ==
Like many rural constituencies across the Cape, Namaqualand was a conservative seat with a largely Afrikaans-speaking electorate. It was a safe seat for the National Party through most of its existence, with the exception of its early years. Its first MP, Sir David Graaff, served in Louis Botha’s cabinet, and was re-elected by a wide margin in 1915, but on his retirement in 1920, the Nationalist J. P. Mostert took the seat. Mostert was in turn defeated in 1929 by independent candidate W. P. Steenkamp, who held Namaqualand as an independent until 1938 and then moved to neighbouring Calvinia, where he won election as a United Party candidate. In that year, Namaqualand was won by the Purified National Party’s W. A. Booysen, and the NP would hold the seat until the end of apartheid.

== Members ==
Election	Member	Party
1910	Sir David Graaff, Bt.	South African
1915	Sir David Graaff, Bt.	South African
1920	J. P. Mostert	National
1921	J. P. Mostert	National
1924	J. P. Mostert	National
1929	W. P. Steenkamp	Independent
1933	W. P. Steenkamp	Independent
1938	W. A. Booysen	GNP
1943	W. A. Booysen	HNP
1948	D. J. Scholtz	HNP
1953	D. J. Scholtz	National
1958	D. J. Scholtz	National
1961	G. de Kock Maree	National
1966	G. de Kock Maree	National
1970	G. de Kock Maree	National
1974	G. de Kock Maree	National
1977	H. M. Janse van Rensburg	National
1981	E. van der Merwe Louw	National
1987	E. van der Merwe Louw	National
1989	E. van der Merwe Louw	National
1994	constituency abolished	

== Detailed results ==
=== Elections in the 1910s ===
General election 1910: Namaqualand
Party	Candidate	Votes	%	±%
South African	Sir David Graaff, Bt.	Unopposed		
South African win (new seat)				

General election 1915: Namaqualand
Party	Candidate	Votes	%	±%
South African	Sir David Graaff, Bt.	1,140	55.0	N/A
National	A. H. Stander	708	34.1	New
Independent	J. Studer	226	10.9	New
Majority		432	20.9	N/A
Turnout		2,074	77.6	N/A
South African hold		Swing	N/A	

=== Elections in the 1920s ===
General election 1920: Namaqualand
Party	Candidate	Votes	%	±%
National	J. P. Mostert	1,459	66.3	+32.2
South African	A. M. J. Roux	741	33.7	−21.3
Majority		718	32.6	N/A
Turnout		2,200	65.7	−11.9
National gain from South African		Swing	+26.8	

General election 1921: Namaqualand
Party	Candidate	Votes	%	±%
National	J. P. Mostert	1,481	69.7	+3.4
South African	E. B. Watermeyer	643	30.3	−3.4
Majority		718	39.4	+6.8
Turnout		2,124	61.2	−4.5
National hold		Swing	+3.4	

General election 1924: Namaqualand
Party	Candidate	Votes	%	±%
National	J. P. Mostert	1,565	65.0	−4.9
South African	G. H. D. Schmolke	808	33.5	+3.2
Rejected ballots		35	1.7	N/A
Majority		757	31.5	−7.9
Turnout		2,408	67.3	+6.1
National hold		Swing	-4.0	

General election 1929: Namaqualand
Party	Candidate	Votes	%	±%
Independent	W. P. Steenkamp	1,258	57.6	New
National	J. P. Mostert	502	23.0	−44.0
Independent	A. M. Roux	391	17.9	New
Independent	W. P. Thorn	8	0.4	New
Rejected ballots		24	1.1	-0.6
Majority		756	34.6	N/A
Turnout		2,183	61.0	−6.3
Independent gain from National		Swing	N/A	

=== Elections in the 1930s ===
General election 1933: Namaqualand
Party	Candidate	Votes	%	±%
Independent	W. P. Steenkamp	2,477	52.9	−4.7
National	A. J. R. van Rhijn	2,151	45.9	+22.9
Rejected ballots		56	1.2	+0.1
Majority		326	7.0	−27.6
Turnout		4,684	83.6	+22.6
Independent hold		Swing	-14.8	

General election 1938: Namaqualand
Party	Candidate	Votes	%	±%
Purified National	W. A. Booysen	3,266	54.3	New
United	J. D. J. Scholtz	2,644	43.9	New
Rejected ballots		109	1.8	+0.6
Majority		622	10.3	N/A
Turnout		6,019	88.3	+4.7
Purified National gain from Independent		Swing	N/A	
