= Joel Krige =

2nd Speaker of the South African National Assembly
- In office 1915–1924
- Prime Minister: Louis Botha
- Preceded by: James Tennant Molteno
- Succeeded by: Ernest George Jansen

Personal details
- Born: 3 March 1868
- Died: 10 August 1933 (aged 65)

Christman Joel Ackerman Krige (3 March 1868 – 10 August 1933) served as Speaker of the Union of South Africa. He was born in Stellenbosch, qualified as a lawyer and established himself in Caledon. He got involved in politics as member of the Afrikanerbond and was deported during the Second Boer War. After becoming mayor, he was elected onto the first Union parliament in 1910 as follower as General Louis Botha. He became Chief Whip of the South African Party and followed Sir John Molteno in 1915 as Speaker of the House of Assembly, a post he held until 1924.

He married Anna Susanna Christina Roos, and had six children: Willem Adolph, Tielman Johannes Roos, Elizabeth Renée, Louisa Jacoba, Christman Joel McKinley and Desirée Suzanna. Issie Smuts was his niece. He died in 1933.

== See also ==
- Krige, surname
