= Green Point (House of Assembly of South Africa constituency) =

- Groenpunt
- Former constituency for the South African House of Assembly
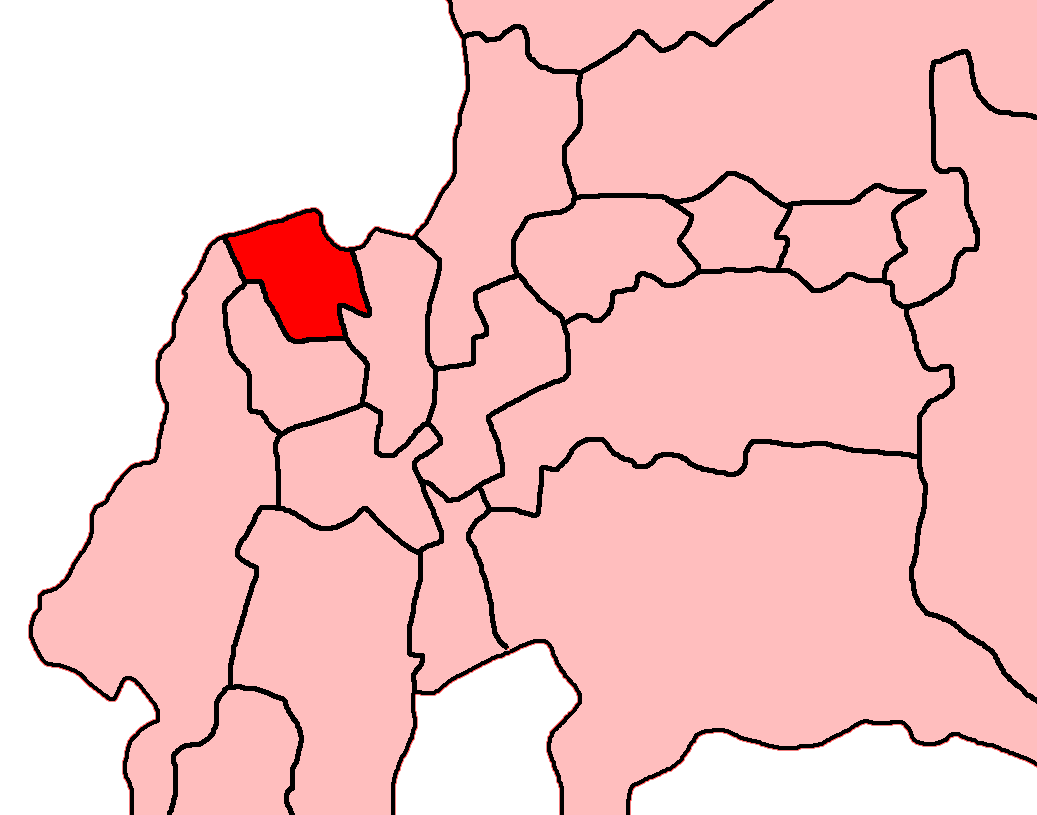
- Location of Green Point within Cape Town (1981)
- Province: Cape of Good Hope
- Electorate: 14,282 (1989)

Former constituency
- Created: 1943
- Abolished: 1994
- Number of members: 1
- Last MHA: Stephanus van der Merwe (DP)
- Created from: Cape Town Central
- Replaced by: Western Cape

Green Point (Afrikaans: Groenpunt) was a constituency in the Cape Province of South Africa, which existed from 1943 to 1994. It covered parts of the Cape Town seashore, including its namesake suburb as well as parts of the CBD. Throughout its existence it elected one member to the House of Assembly and one to the Cape Provincial Council.

== Franchise notes ==
When the Union of South Africa was formed in 1910, the electoral qualifications in use in each pre-existing colony were kept in place. The Cape Colony had implemented a "colour-blind" franchise known as the Cape Qualified Franchise, which included all adult literate men owning more than £75 worth of property (controversially raised from £25 in 1892), and this initially remained in effect after the colony became the Cape Province. As of 1908, 22,784 out of 152,221 electors in the Cape Colony were "Native or Coloured". Eligibility to serve in Parliament and the Provincial Council, however, was restricted to whites from 1910 onward.

The first challenge to the Cape Qualified Franchise came with the Women's Enfranchisement Act, 1930 and the Franchise Laws Amendment Act, 1931, which extended the vote to women and removed property qualifications for the white population only – non-white voters remained subject to the earlier restrictions. In 1936, the Representation of Natives Act removed all black voters from the common electoral roll and introduced three "Native Representative Members", white MPs elected by the black voters of the province and meant to represent their interests in particular. A similar provision was made for Coloured voters with the Separate Representation of Voters Act, 1951, and although this law was challenged by the courts, it went into effect in time for the 1958 general election, which was thus held with all-white voter rolls for the first time in South African history. The all-white franchise would continue until the end of apartheid and the introduction of universal suffrage in 1994.

== History ==
Green Point was created in 1943, out of the abolished seat of Cape Town Central. In its original form, its eastern boundary was Adderley Street, but with the abolition of Cape Town Castle in 1958 and Salt River in 1974, it came to extend across the width of the City Bowl in addition to Green Point itself. For a brief period, including the 1981 general election, it also included the Walvis Bay territory, which had previously formed part of South West Africa for electoral purposes, and would later be split off into its own constituency.

Its first MP, Robert Bowen, had previously represented Cape Town Central, and was a member of the United Party – this party and its successors would hold Green Point throughout its existence. Piet van der Byl, former cabinet minister, represented the seat from 1948 to 1966, and was widely respected on all sides of politics, as evidenced by the fact that he never faced opposition for re-election. After his retirement, the seat began to be contested by the Progressive Party, and in 1977 it was taken by the newly formed Progressive Federal Party under Stephanus van der Merwe, who would represent the seat until its abolition.

== Members ==
Election	Member	Party
1943	R. W. Bowen	United
1948	R. W. Bowen	United
1948 by	P. V. van der Byl	United
1953	P. V. van der Byl	United
1958	P. V. van der Byl	United
1961	P. V. van der Byl	United
1966	L. G. Murray	United
1970	L. G. Murray	United
1974	L. G. Murray	United
1977	S. S. van der Merwe	PFP
1981	S. S. van der Merwe	PFP
1987	S. S. van der Merwe	PFP
1989	S. S. van der Merwe	Democratic
1994	constituency abolished	

== Detailed results ==
=== Elections in the 1940s ===
General election 1943: Green Point
Party	Candidate	Votes	%	±%
United	R. W. Bowen	Unopposed		
United win (new seat)				
