= King William's Town (House of Assembly of South Africa constituency) =

South African constituency, 1910–1994

- Former constituency for the South African House of Assembly
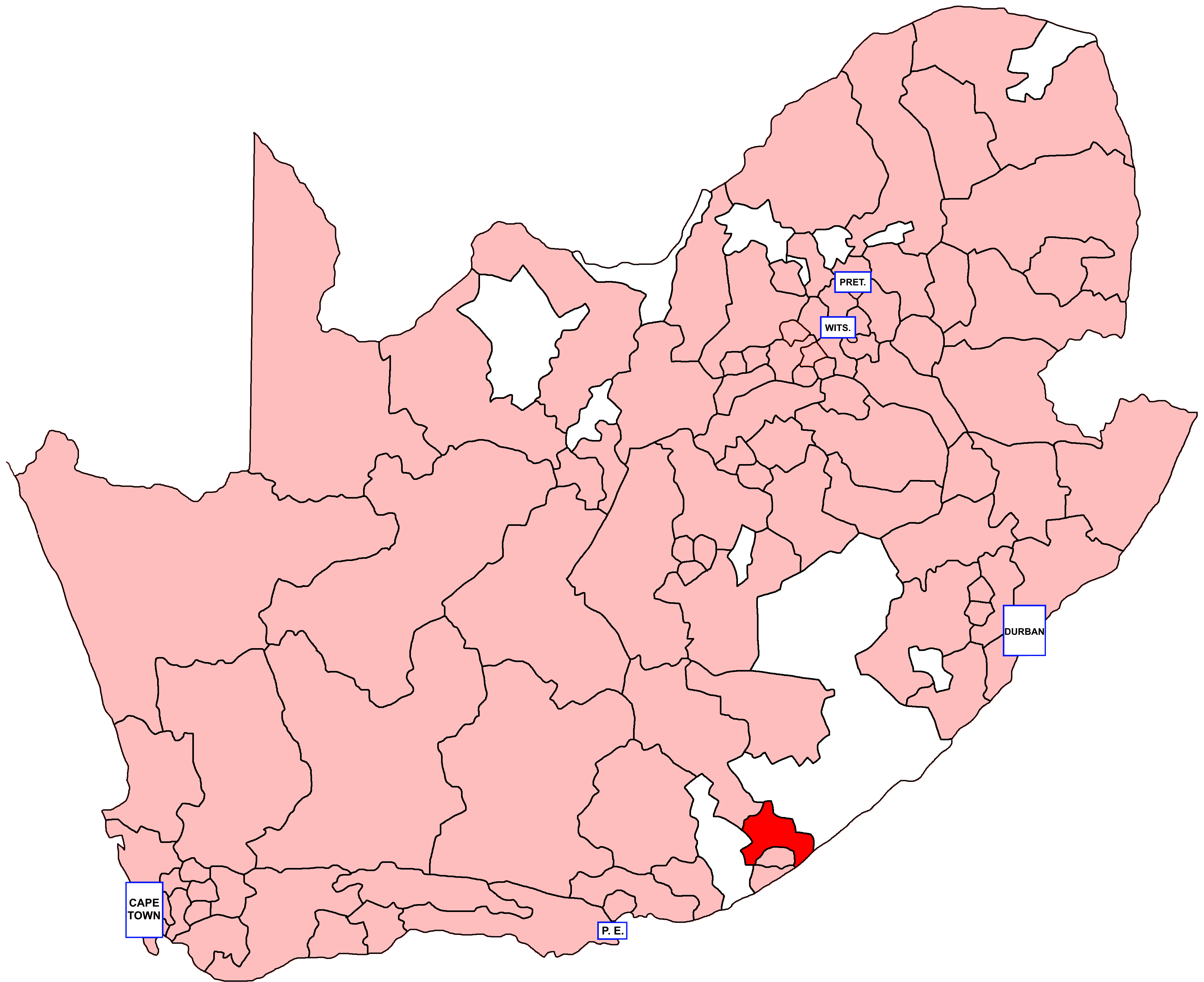
- Location of King William's Town within South Africa (1981)
- Province: Cape of Good Hope
- Electorate: 18,383 (1989)

Former constituency
- Created: 1910
- Abolished: 1994
- Number of members: 1
- Last MHA: (NP)
- Replaced by: Eastern Cape

King William's Town was a constituency in the Cape Province of South Africa, which existed from 1910 to 1994. It covered a rural area of the Eastern Cape centred on its namesake town (since renamed Qonce). Throughout its existence it elected one member to the House of Assembly and one to the Cape Provincial Council.

== Franchise notes ==
When the Union of South Africa was formed in 1910, the electoral qualifications in use in each pre-existing colony were kept in place. The Cape Colony had implemented a “colour-blind” franchise known as the Cape Qualified Franchise, which included all adult literate men owning more than £75 worth of property (controversially raised from £25 in 1892), and this initially remained in effect after the colony became the Cape Province. As of 1908, 22,784 out of 152,221 electors in the Cape Colony were “Native or Coloured”. Eligibility to serve in Parliament and the Provincial Council, however, was restricted to whites from 1910 onward.

The first challenge to the Cape Qualified Franchise came with the Women's Enfranchisement Act, 1930 and the Franchise Laws Amendment Act, 1931, which extended the vote to women and removed property qualifications for the white population only – non-white voters remained subject to the earlier restrictions. In 1936, the Representation of Natives Act removed all black voters from the common electoral roll and introduced three “Native Representative Members”, white MPs elected by the black voters of the province and meant to represent their interests in particular. A similar provision was made for Coloured voters with the Separate Representation of Voters Act, 1951, and although this law was challenged by the courts, it went into effect in time for the 1958 general election, which was thus held with all-white voter rolls for the first time in South African history. The all-white franchise would continue until the end of apartheid and the introduction of universal suffrage in 1994.

== History ==
As with much of the Eastern Cape, the electorate of King William’s Town was largely English-speaking and loyal to the pro-British side of South African politics, electing South African Party and United Party MPs consistently from 1921 until 1977. However, on the collapse of the UP, its more liberal successor parties did not find much favour with King William’s Town’s rural, conservative electorate. Instead, the seat became marginal between the governing National Party, which won it in 1977, and the New Republic Party, an English-speaking conservative opposition party based largely in neighbouring Natal. The NRP won King William’s Town in 1981 in a close contest, one of their few gains in that election and one of two seats ever held by the party outside Natal (the other being neighbouring East London North). In 1987, with the NRP in freefall, the NP retook King William’s Town, and held it until the end of apartheid.

== Members ==
Election	Member	Party
1910	George Whitaker	Independent
1915	George Whitaker	Independent
1920	George Whitaker	Independent
1921	Robert Ballantine	South African
1924	Robert Ballantine	South African
1929	A. C. V. Baines	South African
1933	A. C. V. Baines	South African
1934	A. C. V. Baines	United
1938	A. C. V. Baines	United
1941 by	C. M. Warren	United
1943	C. M. Warren	United
1948	C. M. Warren	United
1953	C. M. Warren	United
1958	C. M. Warren	United
1961	C. M. Warren	United
1966	J. E. Lindsay	United
1970	S. A. van der Heever	United
1974	S. A. van der Heever	United
1977	H. S. Coetzer	National
1981	P. R. C. Rogers	NRP
1987	R. J. Radue	National
1989	R. J. Radue	National
1994	constituency abolished	

== Detailed results ==
=== Elections in the 1910s ===
General election 1910: King William's Town
Party	Candidate	Votes	%	±%
Ind. Unionist	George Whitaker	Unopposed		
Ind. Unionist win (new seat)				

General election 1915: King William's Town
Party	Candidate	Votes	%	±%
Independent	George Whitaker	1,607	59.2	N/A
South African	L. W. Luyt	1,108	40.8	New
Majority		499	18.4	N/A
Turnout		2,715	79.9	N/A
Independent hold		Swing	N/A	

=== Elections in the 1920s ===
General election 1920: King William's Town
Party	Candidate	Votes	%	±%
Independent	George Whitaker	1,461	60.6	+1.4
Labour	J. Carver	949	39.4	New
Majority		512	21.2	N/A
Turnout		2,410	65.8	−14.1
Independent hold		Swing	N/A	

General election 1921: King William's Town
Party	Candidate	Votes	%	±%
South African	Robert Ballantine	1,331	49.6	New
Independent	Carl Hermann Malcomess	805	30.0	New
Labour	John Carver	416	15.5	−23.9
Labour	Thomas Crankshaw	133	5.0	New
Majority		512	19.6	N/A
Turnout		2,685	70.4	+4.6
South African gain from Independent		Swing	N/A	

General election 1924: King William's Town
Party	Candidate	Votes	%	±%
South African	Robert Ballantine	1,433	52.0	+2.4
Independent	C. H. Malcomess	1,262	45.8	+15.8
Rejected ballots		60	2.2	N/A
Majority		171	6.2	−13.4
Turnout		2,755	75.5	+5.1
South African hold		Swing	-6.7	

General election 1929: King William's Town
Party	Candidate	Votes	%	±%
South African	A. C. V. Baines	1,663	54.3	+2.3
Ind. South African	C. H. Malcomess	1,076	35.1	−10.7
Independent	A. H. King	293	9.6	New
Rejected ballots		33	1.0	-1.2
Majority		587	19.2	+13.0
Turnout		3,065	80.3	+4.8
South African hold		Swing	+6.5	

=== Elections in the 1930s ===
General election 1933: King William's Town
Party	Candidate	Votes	%	±%
South African	A. C. V. Baines	Unopposed		
South African hold				

General election 1938: King William's Town
Party	Candidate	Votes	%	±%
United	Arthur Capel Valentine Baines	Unopposed		
United hold				

=== Elections in the 1940s ===
King William's Town by-election, 22 October 1941
Party	Candidate	Votes	%	±%
United	C. M. Warren	4,089	68.2	N/A
Reunited National	G. F. van L. Froneman	1,856	31.0	New
Rejected ballots		47	0.8	N/A
Majority		1,137	37.3	N/A
Turnout		5,992	75.7	N/A
United hold		Swing	N/A	
