= Eddie Trent =

South African politician (1940–2020)

1st Provincial Leader of the Democratic Alliance in the Eastern Cape
- In office 2000–2002
- Preceded by: Position established
- Succeeded by: Athol Trollip

Member of the National Assembly of South Africa
- In office 2004–2009

Member of the Eastern Cape Provincial Legislature
- In office 1994–2004

Member of the House of Assembly for Port Elizabeth Central
- In office 1989–1994
- Preceded by: John Malcomess
- Succeeded by: Assembly abolished

Personal details
- Born: 1940
- Died: 31 December 2020 (aged 80) Port Elizabeth, Eastern Cape, South Africa
- Party: Democratic Alliance (2000–2020)
- Other political affiliations: Democratic Party (1989–2003); Progressive Federal Party (Until 1989)
- Spouse: Elizabeth (m. 1965; died 2019)
- Children: 3
- Profession: Politician

Edward William Trent (1940 – 31 December 2020) was a South African politician. A member of the Progressive Federal Party, he served in the Cape Provincial Council until 1989 when he was elected to the House of Assembly as a member of the Democratic Party. From 1994 to 2004, Trent served in the Eastern Cape Provincial Legislature. He was the first provincial leader of the Democratic Alliance between 2000 and 2002. Trent served in the National Assembly from 2004 until his retirement in 2009.

== Political career ==
A member of the Progressive Federal Party, Trent represented the Port Elizabeth Central Constituency in the previous Cape Provincial Council alongside Molly Blackburn. Trent later joined the Democratic Party and was elected as Member of Parliament for Port Elizabeth Central in 1989, succeeding retiring party chief whip John Malcomess.

After serving one term in Parliament, Trent was elected as the sole DP representative in the newly established Eastern Cape Provincial Legislature in 1994. He was re-elected to a second term in the provincial legislature in 1999. When the Democratic Alliance was formed in 2000, Trent was elected as the party's first provincial leader in the Eastern Cape. After serving one term as provincial leader, Athol Trollip succeeded him.

Trent was elected to the National Assembly in the 2004 general election. He represented the DA on the Standing Committee on Public Accounts.

Trent wrote to National Assembly Speaker Baleka Mbete in 2005 requesting that Auditor General Shauket Fakie appear before the parliamentary committee on the auditor-general over new revelations on his arms deal report. In March 2008, Trent submitted questions to South African President Thabo Mbeki on his alleged involvement in the arms deal. He alleged in August 2008 that the government had something to hide on the arms deal after Justice Director-General, Adv. Menzi Simelane refused to give the DA access to the German and British Mutual Legal Assistance (MLA) agreements with South Africa.

Trent did not seek re-election to the National Assembly in 2009 and retired from politics. In 2018, he was presented with the Congress award for recognition of lifetime achievement in politics.

== Personal life and death ==
Trent was married to Elizabeth and they had three children together. Elizabeth served as a city councillor of Port Elizabeth (later Nelson Mandela Bay) from 1995 to 2011. She died from cancer in January 2019. They would have celebrated their 54th wedding anniversary in April 2019.

Trent died from natural causes at his home in Port Elizabeth on 31 December 2020. He was 80 years old.
