= Krige =

Krige may refer to the following people:

- Alice Krige (born 1954), South African actress
- Corné Krige (born 1975), South African rugby footballer
- Danie G. Krige (1919–2013), South African mining engineer who pioneered the field of geostatistics
- John Krige, South African historian of science and technology
- Uys Krige (1910–1987), South African writer, poet, playwright, translator, rugby player, war correspondent and romantic

== See also ==
- Kriging, a geostatistical method of interpolation, named after Danie Krige
