= Algoa (House of Assembly of South Africa constituency) =

- Former constituency for the South African House of Assembly
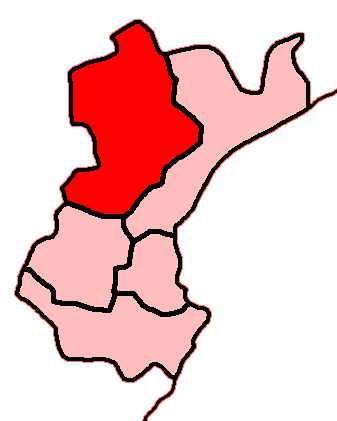
- Location of Algoa within Port Elizabeth (1981)
- Province: Cape of Good Hope
- Electorate: 18,212 (1989)

Former constituency
- Created: 1966
- Abolished: 1994
- Number of members: 1
- Last MHA: F. P. Smit (NP)
- Replaced by: Eastern Cape

Algoa was a constituency in the Cape Province of South Africa, which existed from 1966 to 1994. Named after Algoa Bay, which forms the natural harbour of Port Elizabeth, it covered Port Elizabeth's northwestern suburbs. Despite its name, the constituency was landlocked for most of its existence, with the actual Algoa Bay coastline mostly forming part of the neighbouring seat of Port Elizabeth North. Throughout its existence it elected one member to the House of Assembly and one to the Cape Provincial Council.

== Franchise notes ==
When the Union of South Africa was formed in 1910, the electoral qualifications in use in each pre-existing colony were kept in place. The Cape Colony had implemented a "colour-blind" franchise known as the Cape Qualified Franchise, which included all adult literate men owning more than £75 worth of property (controversially raised from £25 in 1892), and this initially remained in effect after the colony became the Cape Province. As of 1908, 22,784 out of 152,221 electors in the Cape Colony were "Native or Coloured". Eligibility to serve in Parliament and the Provincial Council, however, was restricted to whites from 1910 onward.

The first challenge to the Cape Qualified Franchise came with the Women's Enfranchisement Act, 1930 and the Franchise Laws Amendment Act, 1931, which extended the vote to women and removed property qualifications for the white population only – non-white voters remained subject to the earlier restrictions. In 1936, the Representation of Natives Act removed all black voters from the common electoral roll and introduced three "Native Representative Members", white MPs elected by the black voters of the province and meant to represent their interests in particular. A similar provision was made for Coloured voters with the Separate Representation of Voters Act, 1951, and although this law was challenged by the courts, it went into effect in time for the 1958 general election, which was thus held with all-white voter rolls for the first time in South African history. The all-white franchise would continue until the end of apartheid and the introduction of universal suffrage in 1994.

== History ==
Like most outer suburban seats during the apartheid era, Algoa was a stronghold for the National Party, which held it throughout its existence. In its first election, the NP's Johannes Jacobus Engelbrecht won the seat over his United Party opponent by a margin of 4,400 votes, which increased to 5,315 in 1970. The NP candidate won unopposed in 1977, and in both 1987 and 1989, the main opposition – unusually for the Eastern Cape region – came from the Conservative Party.

== Members ==
Election	Member	Party
1966	J. J. Engelbrecht	National
1970	J. J. Engelbrecht	National
1974	J. J. Engelbrecht	National
1976 by	F. D. Conradie	National
1977	F. D. Conradie	National
1981	J. W. Kleinhans	National
1987	F. P. Smit	National
1989	F. P. Smit	National
1994	constituency abolished	
