= 1989 South African general election =

Last election in South Africa under apartheid

- 6 September 1989

166 of the 178 seats in the House of Assembly 84 seats needed for a majority
- Registered: 3,120,104
- Turnout: 69.48% (▲1.64pp)
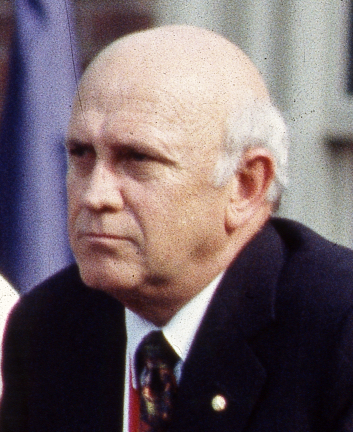

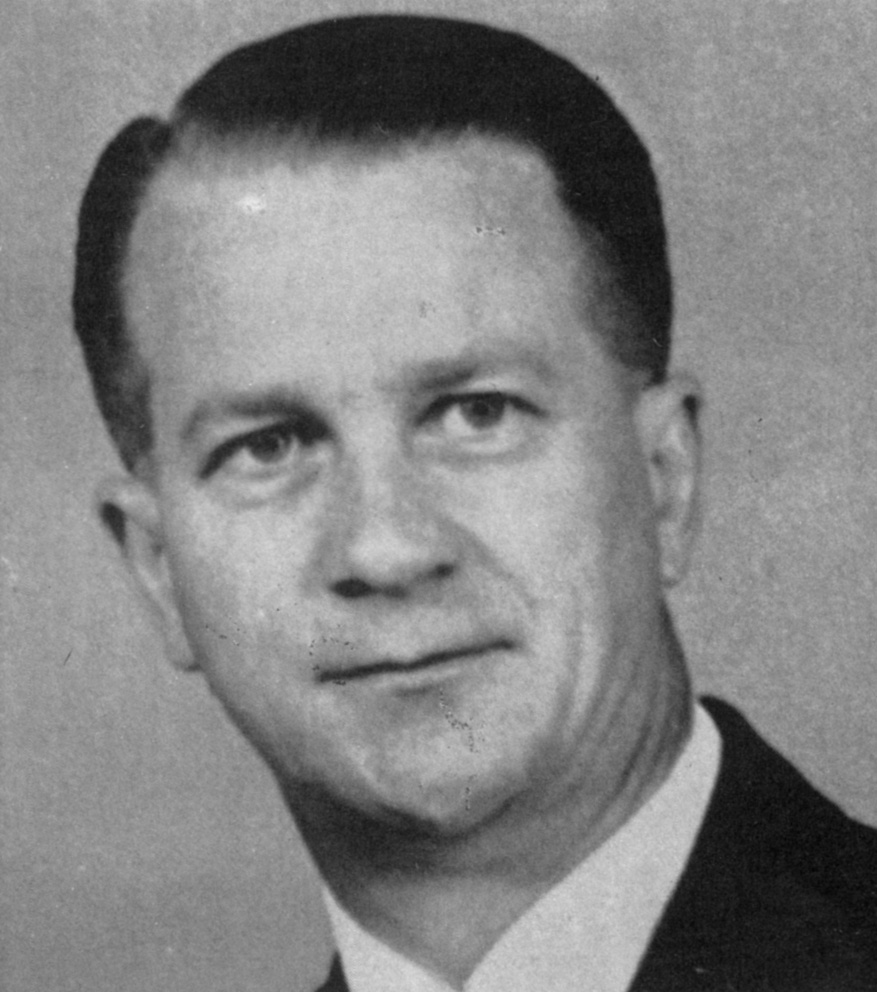

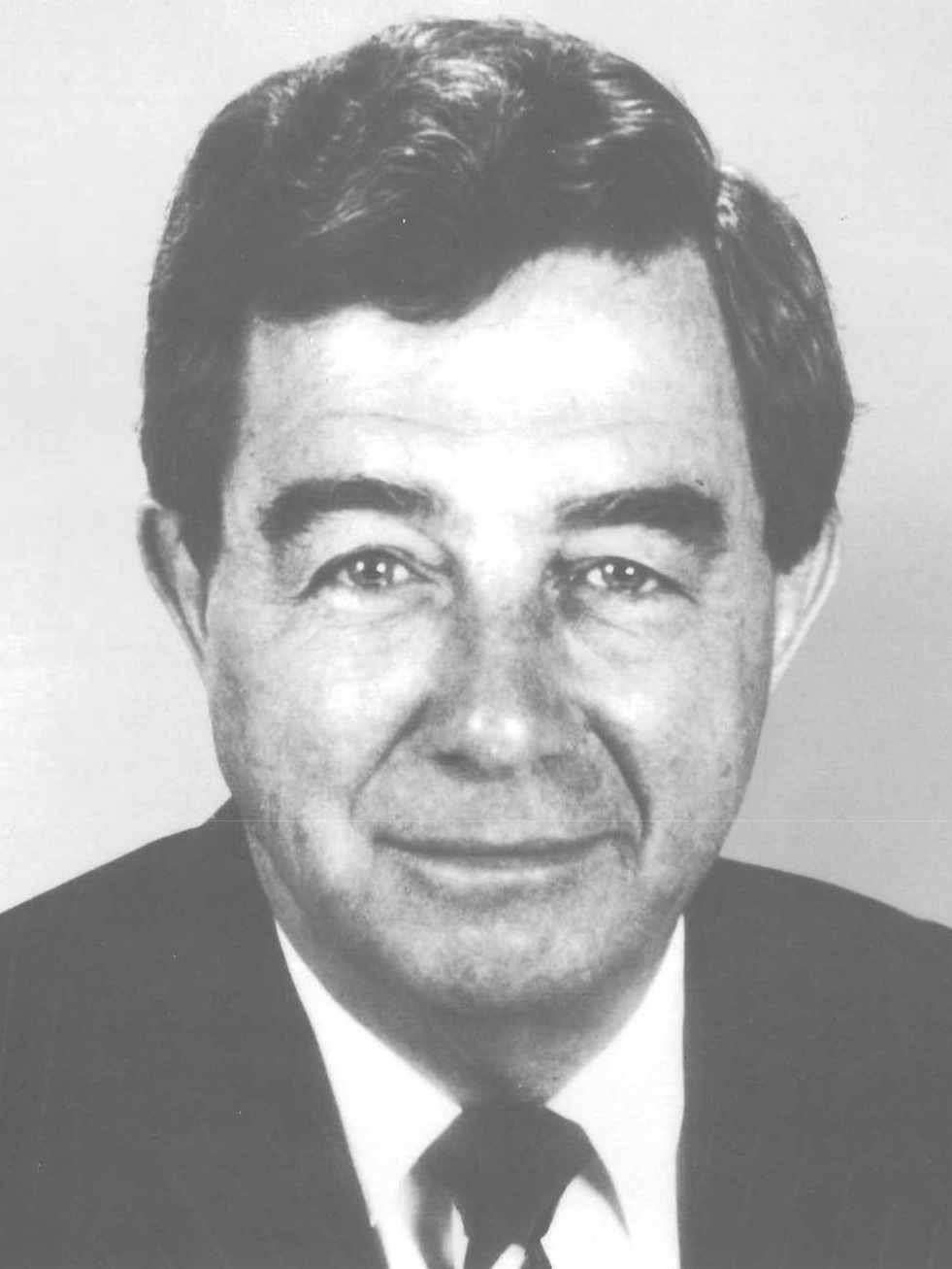
	First party	Second party	Third party
Leader	F. W. de Klerk	Andries Treurnicht	Zach de Beer
Party	National	Conservative	Democratic
Last election	52.70%, 123 seats	26.83%, 22 seats	16.12%, 20 seats (Note: Progressive Federal Party and New Republic Party combined.)
Seats won	94	39	33
Seat change	▼29	▲17	▲13
Popular vote	1,039,704	680,131	431,444
Percentage	48.19%	31.52%	20.00%
Swing	▼4.51pp	▲4.69pp	▲3.88pp
- House of Representatives (Coloured)
- 80 of the 85 seats in the House of Representatives; 41 seats needed for a majority
- Turnout: 18.14% (▼12.80pp)
Party	Leader	Vote %	Seats	+/–
Labour	Allan Hendrickse	66.59	69	−7
DRP		15.39	5	New
UDP		7.69	3	New
Freedom	Arthur Booysen	0.75	1	0
Independents	–	9.57	2	+1
This lists parties that won seats. See the complete results below.
- House of Delegates (Indian)
- 40 of the 45 seats in the House of Delegates; 21 seats needed for a majority
- Turnout: 23.29% (▲2.49pp)
Party	Leader	Vote %	Seats	+/–
Solidarity	JN Reddy	38.02	16	−1
National People's	Amichand Rajbansi	25.16	8	−10
Democratic	Zach de Beer	6.81	3	New
National Federal		5.26	1	+1
PPSA		3.96	1	New
MPP		1.36	3	New
Freedom	Arthur Booysen	0.46	2	New
Independents	–	15.77	6	+2
This lists parties that won seats. See the complete results below.
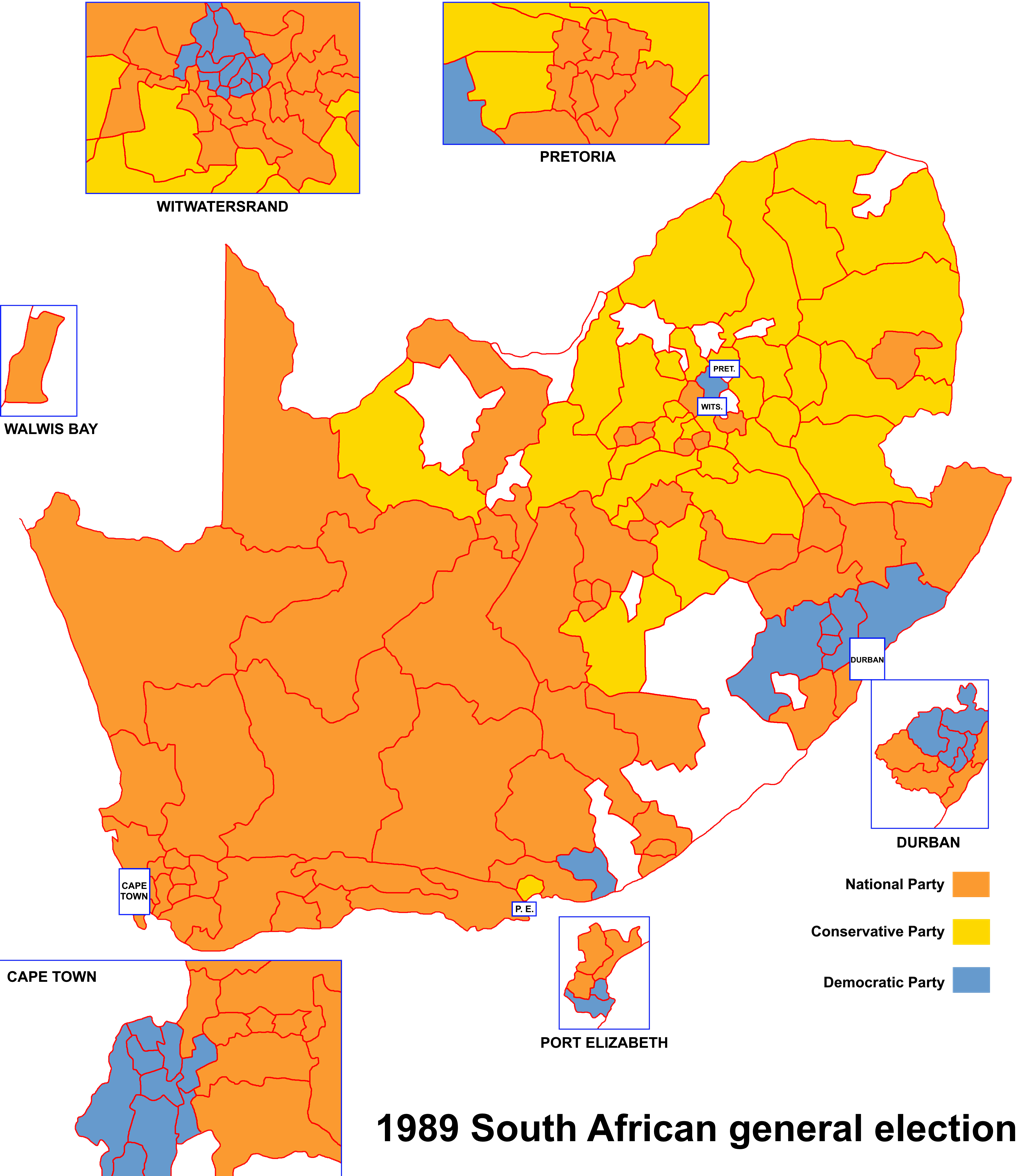
Results by House of Assembly constituency
State President before	State President after
F. W. de Klerk; National	F. W. de Klerk; National

General elections were held in South Africa on 6 September 1989, the last under apartheid. Snap elections had been called early (no election was required until 1992) by the recently elected head of the National Party (NP), F. W. de Klerk, who was in the process of replacing P. W. Botha as the country's president, and his expected program of reform to include further retreat from the policy of apartheid. The creation of the Conservative Party had realigned the NP as a moderate party, now almost certain to initiate negotiations with the black opposition, with liberal opposition (the PFP) openly seeking a new constitutional settlement on liberal democratic and federalist principles.

Although the National Party won a comfortable majority of seats (94 of 166) in the House of Assembly, the governing party suffered a setback and received only 48% of the popular vote, the first elections since 1961 in which the NP failed to win a majority of the vote. However, the first-past-the-post system, and a severely fractured opposition as well as the twelve appointed and indirectly elected members entrenched the NP's majority, allowing it to comfortably remain in power.

The Conservative Party (CP), which opposed any form of power-sharing with other races, failed to accomplish a breakthrough beyond its conservative Afrikaner backing as some had expected, but remained the official opposition with 39 seats. By some estimates, the party had received the backing of a slim majority of Afrikaners particularly in the Orange Free State, once the NP's heartland, but with very limited support among English-speaking voters.

Before the elections, the liberal Progressive Federal Party (PFP) had dissolved itself and regrouped as the Democratic Party (DP), winning 33 seats, six seats short of retaking its position as the official opposition. In terms of vote share, it fell a quarter million votes behind the CP, but was favoured by its stronghold in the Cape Province and Natal.

== House of Assembly (white) ==
The White Chamber of Parliament had 178 members, 166 of whom were directly elected (including a seat from Walvis Bay annexed from South West Africa, which was added in 1981) with 8 members indirectly elected by the directly elected members on the basis of proportional representation and four nominated by the State President (one from each province).

The results of the election were interpreted by the government (based on support for the NP and the DP together) as a mandate from the white electorate to reform the apartheid system and seek a compromise with the African National Congress and its leader Nelson Mandela. Mandela was released half a year later, and the 1989 elections were the last under the limited, whites-only franchise and the Tricameral Parliament introduced in 1984.

Of the twelve appointed and indirectly elected seats, nine were taken by the National Party, two by the Conservative Party and one by the Democratic Party.

Two seats won by the Democratic Party were uncontested, while the National and Conservative parties were tied in the Orange Free State division of Fauresmith. A five-month court battle followed after the Free State Supreme Court ordered a recount, which eventually resulted in a majority of five votes for the National Party candidate.

Party	Votes	%	Seats	+/–
National Party	1,039,704	48.19	94	−29
Conservative Party	680,131	31.52	39	+17
Democratic Party	431,444	20.00	33	+13
Herstigte Nasionale Party	5,416	0.25	0	0
Independents	898	0.04	0	–1
Presidential appointees			4	0
Indirectly-elected members			8	0
Total	2,157,593	100.00	178	0
Valid votes	2,157,593	99.52		
Invalid/blank votes	10,336	0.48		
Total votes	2,167,929	100.00		
Registered voters/turnout	3,120,104	69.48		

=== Provincial breakdown ===
Province	National	Conservative	Democratic	Total
Transvaal	34	31	11	76
Cape	42	2	12	56
Natal	10	0	10	20
Orange Free State	8	6	0	14
Total	94	39	33	166

=== Cape Province ===
Constituency	Region	1987 result	1989 winning party				Turnout	Votes					
Constituency	Region	1987 result	Party	Votes	Share	Majority	Turnout	NP	DP	CP	HNP	Independents	Total
Albany	East	NP	DP	6,060	52.6%	687	69.3%	5,373	6,060				11,510
Algoa	East	NP	NP	7,094	62.7%	3,101	62.1%	7,094		3,993			11,315
Aliwal	East	NP	NP	4,419	62.5%	1,840	71.4%	4,419		2,579			7,066
Beaufort West	West	NP	NP	4,086	57.1%	1,067	80.2%	4,086		3,019			7,155
Bellville	West	NP	NP	6,607	66.8%	4,666	65.1%	6,607	1,326	1,941			9,896
Caledon	West	NP	NP	7,211	72.3%	4,605	71.1%	7,211	2,606				9,978
Cape Town Gardens	West	PFP	DP	5,975	63.0%	2,520	57.4%	3,455	5,975				9,484
Ceres	West	NP	NP	5,390	64.7%	2,519	77.3%	5,390		2,871			8,335
Claremont	West	PFP	DP	8,078	77.3%	5,720	61.9%	2,358	8,078				10,455
Constantia	West	PFP	DP	10,132	73.3%	6,478	67.3%	3,654	10,132				13,832
Cradock	East	NP	NP	4,251	50.5%	1,359	81.2%	4,251	1,254	2,892			8,415
De Aar	North	NP	NP	4,402	53.1%	579	82.9%	4,402		3,823			8,292
De Kuilen	West	NP	NP	9,997	66.6%	7,204	71.2%	9,997	2,187	2,793			15,009
Durbanville	West	NP	NP	11,597	57.0%	3,060	75.9%	11,597	8,537				20,334
East London City	East	NP	NP	4,807	52.1%	446	57.0%	4,807	4,361				9,233
East London North	East	NP	NP	5,556	46.7%	500	65.7%	5,556	5,056	1,256			11,903
False Bay	West	NP	NP	7,856	68.1%	5,931	66.4%	7,856	1,726	1,925			11,538
George	West	NP	NP	7,781	52.5%	3,967	73.4%	7,781	3,179	3,814			14,813
Gordonia	West	NP	NP	4,569	56.8%	1,119	76.8%	4,569		3,450			8,041
Graaff-Reinet	East	NP	NP	3,991	52.3%	1,381	80.4%	3,991	1,022	2,610			7,637
Green Point	West	PFP	DP	4,814	61.3%	1,823	55.0%	2,991	4,814				7,852
Groote Schuur	West	PFP	DP	6,285	75.1%	4,246	56.5%	2,039	6,285				8,374
Helderberg	West	NP	NP	10,540	55.0%	2,048	77.4%	10,540	8,492				19,173
Humansdorp	East	NP	NP	6,327	48.3%	2,261	73.6%	6,327	2,704	4,066			13,112
Kimberley North	North	NP	NP	5,525	57.3%	1,560	70.2%	5,525		3,965			9,644
Kimberley South	North	NP	NP	6,541	61.1%	2,658	70.1%	6,541		3,883	123		10,706
King William's Town	East	NP	NP	6,207	51.3%	401	65.8%	6,207	5,806				12,089
Kuruman	North	NP	CP	4,566	52.5%	435	84.6%	4,131		4,566			8,702
Maitland	West	NP	NP	6,154	54.1%	1,405	57.0%	6,154	4,749		441		11,374
Malmesbury	West	NP	NP	9,099	71.1%	5,615	62.0%	9,099	3,484				12,792
Mossel Bay	West	NP	NP	7,327	61.3%	2,805	78.6%	7,327		4,522			11,945
Namaqualand	North	NP	NP	4,263	56.1%	959	76.4%	4,263		3,304			7,596
Newton Park	East	NP	NP	7,197	57.0%	1,897	68.5%	7,197	5,300				12,628
Oudtshoorn	West	NP	NP	5,673	54.8%	1,039	80.0%	5,673		4,634			10,349
Paarl	West	NP	NP	7,059	61.7%	4,456	71.7%	7,059	1,748	2,603			11,441
Parow	West	NP	NP	7,362	83.3%	6,039	54.7%	7,362	1,323				8,842
Piketberg	West	NP	NP	7,935	70.3%	4,991	78.0%	7,935	398	2,944			11,294
Pinelands	West	PFP	DP	8,174	71.8%	5,021	71.3%	3,153	8,174				11,380
Port Elizabeth Central	East	PFP	DP	5,505	59.7%	1,870	62.6%	3,635	5,505				9,228
Port Elizabeth North	East	NP	NP	5,117	65.7%	2,705	50.2%	5,117		2,412	119		7,792
Prieska	North	NP	NP	3,695	58.6%	1,150	78.5%	3,695		2,545			6,303
Queenstown	East	NP	NP	4,014	43.3%	1,108	75.2%	4,014	2,906	2,302			9,278
Sea Point	West	PFP	DP	8,879	79.0%	6,561	64.1%	2,318	8,879				11,237
Simonstown	West	NP	DP	9,282	60.7%	3,362	69.3%	5,920	9,282				15,280
Stellenbosch	West	NP	NP	5,772	61.2%	2,215	68.2%	5,772	3,557				9,435
Sundays River	East	NP	NP	5,778	55.6%	1,217	76.0%	5,778		4,561			10,383
Swellendam	West	NP	NP	5,724	57.5%	2,681	78.3%	5,724	1,154	3,043			9,947
Tygervallei	West	NP	NP	6,274	70.2%	4,260	50.7%	6,274	2,014		579		8,932
Uitenhage	East	NP	CP	6,217	50.2%	126	76.0%	6,091		6,217			12,377
Vasco	West	NP	NP	6,544	70.6%	3,899	56.3%	6,544		2,645			9,271
Vryburg	North	NP	NP	4,261	54.0%	659	81.5%	4,261		3,602			7,892
Walmer	East	NP	DP	6,798	53.1%	891	70.4%	5,907	6,798				12,798
Walvis Bay	West	NP	NP	1,868	65.6%	912	57.2%	1,868		956			2,846
Wellington	West	NP	NP	8,164	62.9%	4,743	63.6%	8,164	1,370	3,421			12,976
Worcester	West	NP	NP	6,679	59.8%	3,409	73.4%	6,679	1,193	3,270			11,170
Wynberg	West	NP	DP	7,253	63.0%	3,024	66.5%	4,229	7,253				11,515
Total for all constituencies							Turnout						
Total for all constituencies							Turnout	NP	DP	CP	HNP	Independents	Total
Total for all constituencies							Turnout	Votes					Total
Total for all constituencies							68.6%	315,967	164,687	106,427	1,262	0	592,194
Total for all constituencies							68.6%	53.4%	27.8%	17.9%	0.2%	0%	100.0%
Total for all constituencies							68.6%	Seats					
Total for all constituencies							68.6%	42	12	2	0	0	56
Total for all constituencies							68.6%	75%	21.4%	3.6%	0%	0%	100.0%

=== Natal ===
Constituency	1987 result	1989 winning party				Turnout	Votes					
Constituency	1987 result	Party	Votes	Share	Majority	Turnout	NP	DP	CP	HNP	Independents	Total
Amanzimtoti	NP	NP	6,630	49.0%	1,722	67.3%	6,630	4,908	1,968			13,526
Berea	PFP	DP	7,779	68.2%	4,279	66.1%	3,500	7,779				11,403
Durban Central	PFP	DP	6,326	63.4%	2,739	58.8%	3,587	6,326				9,978
Durban North	PFP	DP	8,376	64.7%	3,854	68.2%	4,522	8,376				12,955
Durban Point	NP	NP	4,102	47.0%	694	51.3%	4,102	3,408	1,177			8,725
Greytown	PFP	DP	8,235	51.4%	1,808	71.3%	6,427	8,235	1,318			16,010
Klip River	NP	NP	5,053	47.8%	1,916	70.0%	5,053	2,355	3,137			10,580
Mooi River	NRP	DP	6,612	54.0%	2,300	70.1%	4,312	6,612	1,256			12,253
Newcastle	NP	NP	6,054	50.8%	961	68.2%	6,054	750	5,093			11,909
Pietermaritzburg North	NP	DP	6,252	48.3%	620	68.8%	5,632	6,252	1,021			12,936
Pietermaritzburg South	NP	DP	7,332	48.8%	764	69.9%	6,568	7,332	1,057			15,037
Pinetown	PFP	DP	8,957	61.7%	3,703	67.7%	5,254	8,957			241	14,519
Port Natal	NP	NP	5,620	49.6%	2,247	61.0%	5,620	3,373	2,310			11,336
South Coast	NP	NP	6,095	50.2%	1,525	71.9%	6,095	4,570	1,451			12,144
Umbilo	NP	DP	4,783	48.1%	725	59.3%	4,058	4,783	1,080			9,949
Umfolozi	NP	NP	5,010	42.3%	907	66.7%	5,010	2,437	4,103			11,564
Umhlanga	NP	DP	6,626	51.5%	1,406	70.1%	5,220	6,626	1,012			12,873
Umhlatuzana	NP	NP	7,459	56.7%	1,881	60.1%	7,459	5,578				13,159
Umlazi	NP	NP	6,149	51.6%	2,835	61.2%	6,149	3,314	2,429			11,919
Vryheid	NP	NP	5,825	50.4%	1,434	72.6%	5,825	1,072	4,391	256		11,558
Total for all constituencies						Turnout						
Total for all constituencies						Turnout	NP	DP	CP	HNP	Independents	Total
Total for all constituencies						Turnout	Votes					Total
Total for all constituencies						66.2%	107,077	103,043	32,803	256	241	244,343
Total for all constituencies						66.2%	43.8%	42.2%	13.4%	0.1%	0.1%	100.0%
Total for all constituencies						66.2%	Seats					
Total for all constituencies						66.2%	10	10	0	0	0	20
Total for all constituencies						66.2%	50%	50%	0%	5%	0%	100.0%

=== Orange Free State ===
Constituency	1987 result	1989 winning party				Turnout	Votes				
Constituency	1987 result	Party	Votes	Share	Majority	Turnout	NP	CP	DP	HNP	Total
Bethlehem	NP	NP	6,373	48.2%	401	81.3%	6,373	5,972	716	159	13,232
Bloemfontein East	NP	NP	8,515	57.0%	2,148	72.2%	8,515	6,367			14,951
Bloemfontein North	NP	NP	6,476	56.3%	3,204	68.7%	6,476	3,272	1,732		11,508
Bloemfontein West	NP	NP	7,371	60.8%	2,696	72.1%	7,371	4,675			12,125
Fauresmith	NP	NP (Note: Seat awarded to the National Party after court-ordered recount)	4,519	49.2%	0	86.7%	4,519	4,519		120	9,185
Heilbron	NP	CP	5,896	49.5%	124	81.2%	5,772	5,896		231	11,922
Kroonstad	NP	NP	6,706	54.9%	1,294	76.4%	6,706	5,412			12,211
Ladybrand	NP	CP	5,805	48.2%	70	86.3%	5,735	5,805	471		12,041
Parys	NP	CP	7,736	54.9%	1,413	82.2%	6,323	7,736			14,100
Sasolburg	NP	CP	7,361	49.9%	22	71.7%	7,339	7,361			14,747
Smithfield	NP	CP	5,080	50.0%	105	77.3%	4,975	5,080			10,151
Virginia	NP	NP	6,911	47.4%	47	70.6%	6,911	6,864	680	88	14,587
Welkom	NP	CP	9,312	49.8%	856	71.8%	8,456	9,312	791	112	18,687
Winburg	NP	NP	7,538	54.0%	1,218	81.0%	7,538	6,320			13,947
Total for all constituencies						Turnout					Total
Total for all constituencies						Turnout	NP	CP	DP	HNP	Total
Total for all constituencies						Turnout	Votes				
Total for all constituencies						76.6%	86,533	84,591	5,453	966	183,394
Total for all constituencies						76.6%	47.2%	46.1%	3.0%	0.5%	100.0%
Total for all constituencies						76.6%	Seats				
Total for all constituencies						76.6%	8	6	0	0	14
Total for all constituencies						76.6%	57.1%	42.9%	0%	0%	100.0%

=== Transvaal ===
Constituency	Region	1987 result	1989 winning party				Turnout	Votes					
Constituency	Region	1987 result	Party	Votes	Share	Majority	Turnout	NP	CP	DP	HNP	Independents	Total
Alberton	PWV	NP	NP	7,161	47.8%	753	67.3%	7,161	6,408	1,325			14,982
Barberton	East	CP	CP	7,708	54.6%	1,381	78.0%	6,327	7,708				14,109
Benoni	PWV	NP	NP	5,957	44.5%	2,752	66.0%	5,957	3,205	4,212			13,394
Bethal	East	CP	CP	12,383	56.4%	3,066	71.2%	9,317	12,383		210		21,967
Bezuidenhout	PWV	NP	DP	5,618	46.6%	356	56.6%	5,262	976	5,618		162	12,063
Boksburg	PWV	NP	NP	8,043	50.0%	2,390	69.4%	8,043	5,653	2,260	111		16,093
Brakpan	PWV	CP	CP	7,543	50.4%	891	68.9%	6,652	7,543	729			14,969
Brentwood	PWV	NP	NP	8,997	48.1%	2,374	71.9%	8,997	6,623	3,016			18,691
Brits	West	CP	CP	8,831	60.1%	3,032	77.6%	5,799	8,831				14,687
Bryanston	PWV	PFP	DP	10,947	71.5%	6,642	67.8%	4,305		10,947			15,320
Carletonville	PWV	CP	CP	7,918	53.0%	955	70.1%	6,963	7,918				14,940
Delmas	East	CP	CP	8,956	51.0%	581	75.2%	8,375	8,956				17,553
Edenvale	PWV	NP	DP	9,358	59.4%	3,551	70.0%	5,807		9,358		451	3,551
Ermelo	East	CP	CP	7,695	53.6%	1,074	77.9%	6,621	7,695				14,363
Florida	PWV	NP	NP	7,566	51.0%	3,882	73.2%	7,566	3,529	3,684			14,826
Geduld	PWV	NP	NP	8,285	45.9%	377	72.7%	8,285	7,908	1,826			18,046
Germiston	PWV	NP	NP	6,198	47.5%	1,315	63.8%	6,198	4,883	1,953			13,054
Germiston District	PWV	NP	NP	7,000	46.0%	926	64.3%	7,000	6,074	2,088			15,207
Gezina	PWV	NP	NP	6,421	49.4%	7	65.8%	6,421	6,414				13,010
Helderkruin	PWV	NP	NP	12,113	50.8%	5,748	74.0%	12,113	5,302	6,365			23,832
Hercules	PWV	NP	CP	9,379	59.8%	3,538	68.1%	5,841	9,379		371	44	15,673
Hillbrow	PWV	PFP	DP	3,971	49.7%	1,054	44.3%	2,917	1,079	3,971			7,997
Houghton	PWV	PFP	DP	10,003	72.7%	6,301	66.1%	3,702		10,003			13,752
Innesdal	PWV	NP	NP	8,250	53.8%	1,509	76.8%	8,250	6,741		255		15,344
Jeppe	PWV	NP	NP	4,593	54.2%	1,922	40.6%	4,593	2,671	1,189			8,480
Johannesburg North	PWV	PFP	DP	9,511	73.9%	6,205	67.4%	3,306		9,511			12,874
Johannesburg West	PWV	NP	NP	4,247	42.1%	1,328	55.5%	4,247	2,919	2,870			10,088
Kempton Park	PWV	NP	NP	7,461	52.0%	2,196	67.3%	7,461	5,265	1,601			14,351
Klerksdorp	West	NP	NP	10,440	48.7%	495	72.3%	10,440	9,945	1,008			21,443
Koedoespoort	PWV	NP	NP	7,477	46.9%	271	73.9%	7,477	7,206	1,200			15,958
Krugersdorp	PWV	NP	NP	8,188	52.8%	949	69.3%	8,188	7,239				15,518
Langlaagte	PWV	NP	NP	6,580	56.6%	1,701	59.3%	6,580	4,879				11,618
Lichtenburg	West	CP	CP	7,906	62.4%	3,195	79.1%	4,711	7,906				12,663
Losberg	PWV	CP	CP	8,342	54.0%	1,302	66.7%	7,040	8,342				15,459
Lydenburg	East	NP	CP	6,753	50.9%	870	78.4%	5,883	6,753	332	165		13,266
Maraisburg	PWV	NP	CP	5,340	50.0%	214	52.3%	5,126	5,340		71		10,679
Meyerton	PWV	NP	CP	9,069	44.7%	7	70.6%	9,062	9,069	2,112			20,285
Middelburg	East	CP	CP	10,472	57.8%	3,688	74.7%	6,784	10,472	609	230		18,113
Modderfontein	PWV	NP	NP	10,269	50.4%	4,159	68.4%	10,269	6,110	3,972			20,392
Nelspruit	East	NP	NP	7,417	46.8%	496	73.9%	7,417	6,921	1,472			15,833
Nigel	PWV	CP	CP	9,466	52.7%	1,207	75.3%	8,259	9,466		193		17,969
North Rand	PWV	NP	DP	13,542	42.6%	2,305	72.9%	11,237	6,901	13,542			31,820
Overvaal	PWV	CP	CP	8,589	54.2%	1,426	65.4%	7,163	8,589				15,849
Parktown	PWV	PFP	DP	8,804	75.1%	6,004	65.1%	2,800		8,804			11,730
Pietersburg	North	CP	CP	9,174	53.8%	1,356	74.8%	9,174	7,818				17,061
Potchefstroom	West	NP	NP	8,684	54.8%	1,583	76.3%	8,684	7,101				15,846
Potgietersrus	North	CP	CP	9,090	60.0%	3,141	80.8%	5,949	9,090				15,146
Pretoria Central	PWV	NP	NP	5,916	54.7%	1,969	57.3%	5,916	3,947	776	140		10,819
Pretoria East	PWV	NP	NP	17,237	55.0%	10,099	80.6%	17,237	7,138	6,875			31,341
Pretoria West	PWV	NP	CP	8,085	57.1%	2,149	59.2%	5,936	8,085				14,148
Primrose	PWV	NP	NP	7,253	54.8%	1,359	68.4%	7,253	5,894				13,244
Randburg	PWV	Ind	DP	8,481	52.9%	1,714	74.1%	6,767	755	8,481			16,038
Randfontein	PWV	CP	CP	9,060	59.3%	2,902	58.8%	6,158	9,060				15,278
Rissik	PWV	NP	NP	6,778	52.6%	3,533	69.0%	6,778	3,245	2,817			12,893
Roodeplaat	PWV	NP	CP	9,983	50.9%	565	74.7%	9,418	9,983				19,629
Roodepoort	PWV	CP	CP	7,724	52.3%	796	66.1%	6,928	7,724				14,759
Rosettenville	PWV	NP	NP	6,195	55.9%	3,282	58.4%	6,195	2,913	1,945			11,083
Rustenburg	West	NP	CP	8,921	53.8%	1,502	68.9%	7,419	8,921		183		16,591
Sandton	PWV	PFP	DP		100%					Unopposed			
Schweizer-Reneke	West	CP	CP	7,146	57.4%	1,892	83.8%	5,254	7,146				12,459
Soutpansberg	North	CP	CP	8,130	51.4%	530	84.3%	7,600	8,130				15,807
Springs	PWV	NP	NP	6,622	49.0%	1,241	68.8%	6,622	5,381	1,473			13,507
Standerton	East	CP	CP	9,081	56.9%	2,249	74.1%	6,832	9,081				15,970
Stilfontein	West	NP	CP	5,865	59.6%	1,926	67.3%	3,939	5,865				9,840
Sunnyside	PWV	NP	NP	6,374	51.6%	3,073	67.4%	6,374	3,301	2,623			12,341
Turffontein	PWV	NP	NP	7,957	49.9%	3,958	63.4%	7,957	3,999	3,961			15,939
Vanderbijlpark	PWV	NP	NP	10,295	59.2%	3,246	67.7%	10,295	7,049				17,401
Ventersdorp	West	CP	CP	7,488	57.2%	2,106	77.4%	5,382	7,488		152		13,083
Vereeniging	PWV	NP	NP	7,199	47.1%	5	70.4%	7,199	7,194	863			15,292
Verwoerdburg	PWV	NP	NP	12,085	56.4%	5,524	79.4%	12,085	6,561	2,753			21,445
Waterberg	North	CP	CP	8,746	60.2%	3,990	77.4%	4,756	8,746		1,015		14,530
Waterkloof	PWV	NP	NP	8,220	48.8%	2,307	82.8%	8,220	2,667	5,913			16,837
Westdene	PWV	NP	NP	6,974	49.7%	2,647	70.5%	6,974	2,691	4,327			14,020
Witbank	East	CP	CP	9,596	53.1%	2,091	69.0%	7,505	9,596	949			18,083
Wonderboom	PWV	NP	CP	11,703	51.4%	905	75.6%	10,798	11,703		212		22,760
Yeoville	PWV	PFP	DP		100%					Unopposed			
Total for all constituencies							Turnout						
Total for all constituencies							Turnout	NP	CP	DP	HNP	Independents	Total
Total for all constituencies							Turnout	Votes					Total
Total for all constituencies							67.9%	528,170	460,829	159,333	3,308	657	1,157,193
Total for all constituencies							67.9%	45.6%	39.8%	13.8%	0.3%	0.1%	100.0%
Total for all constituencies							67.9%	Seats					
Total for all constituencies							67.9%	34	31	11	0	0	76
Total for all constituencies							67.9%	44.7%	40.8%	14.5%	0%	0%	100.0%

== House of Representatives (coloured) ==
All five appointed and indirectly elected seats were taken by the Labour Party. This election was largely boycotted; voter turnout was only at 18%.

Party	Votes	%	Seats	+/–
Labour Party	171,930	66.59	69	–7
Democratic Reform Party	39,741	15.39	5	New
United Democratic Party	19,861	7.69	3	New
Freedom Party	1,949	0.75	1	0
Independents	24,705	9.57	2	+1
Presidential appointees			2	New
Indirectly-elected members			3	New
Total	258,186	100.00	85	+5
Valid votes	258,186	98.90		
Invalid/blank votes	2,861	1.10		
Total votes	261,047	100.00		
Registered voters/turnout	1,439,112	18.14		

== House of Delegates (Indian) ==
Of the five appointed and indirectly elected seats, three were taken by Solidarity, one by the National People's Party and one by the Merit People's Party. This election was largely boycotted; voter turnout was only at 23%.

Party	Votes	%	Seats	+/–
Solidarity	58,216	38.02	16	–1
National People's Party	38,523	25.16	8	–10
Democratic Party	10,427	6.81	3	New
National Federal Party	8,058	5.26	1	+1
People's Party of South Africa	6,064	3.96	1	New
United Party	2,712	1.77	0	New
Merit People's Party	2,078	1.36	3	New
Progressive Independent Party	1,497	0.98	0	–1
Freedom Party	703	0.46	2	New
Republican Party	701	0.46	0	New
Independents	24,157	15.77	6	+2
Presidential appointees			2	New
Indirectly-elected members			3	New
Total	153,136	100.00	45	0
Valid votes	153,136	99.10		
Invalid/blank votes	1,388	0.90		
Total votes	154,524	100.00		
Registered voters/turnout	663,604	23.29		

== See also ==
- 21st South African Parliament
- White backlash
