= Theo Alant =

South African politician

Member of the National Assembly
- In office May 1994 – April 1999

Personal details
- Citizenship: South Africa
- Party: National Party

Theodorus Gerhardus "Theo" Alant is a South African politician who represented the National Party (NP) in the National Assembly from 1994 to 1999. He was elected in the 1994 general election and served as the NP's spokesperson on finance.

Before the end of apartheid, Alant served in the NP government of President F. W. de Klerk as deputy administrator for economic affairs and technology. He represented the NP during the negotiations to end apartheid and in subsequent negotiations for the drafting of the post-apartheid constitution. He remained with the NP after it was restyled as the New National Party in 1997, but he left Parliament after the 1999 general election and became a farmer in Jacobsdal, Free State.
