= Myburgh Streicher =

South African politician (1928–2005)

Member of the National Assembly
- In office 1994–1999

Personal details
- Born: Daniel Myburgh Streicher; 27 March 1928
- Died: 21 February 2005 (aged 76)
- Citizenship: South Africa
- Party: National Party (since 1977)
- Other political affiliations: South African Party (1977); United Party (until 1977)

Daniel Myburgh Streicher (27 March 1928 – 21 February 2005) was a South African politician who served in the House of Assembly and National Assembly until 1999. He was a member of the United Party and founding leader of the South African Party before he joined the National Party in 1977.

== Political career ==
Born on 27 March 1928, Streicher was a member of the House of Assembly during apartheid. He was leader of the United Party in the Cape Province until January 1977, when he, John Wiley, and four others broke away and formed what became, in May, the South African Party. Streicher was the leader of the new party. After failing to gain a seat in the 1977 general election, Streicher defected to the National Party in December.

In the first post-apartheid elections in 1994, Streicher was elected to represented the National Party in the new National Assembly. He served a single term: in the 1999 general election, he stood for re-election in the Western Cape constituency, but he was ranked low on the party list and did not win a seat.
