= South African Party (1977) =

Political party from 1977 to 1980 in South Africa

The South African Party was a small political party in South Africa from 1977 to 1980.

It was formed by six self-described centrist MPs who had been expelled from the United Party on 19 January 1977 for refusing to accept the party's decision to accept the Marais plan to create a new united opposition party, which became the New Republic Party.

The six constituted themselves as the Independent United Party. The party renamed itself the South African Party (SAP) and elected MP Myburgh Streicher as its leader at its founding conference held in Pretoria on 27 and 28 May 1977. The new party committed itself to a federal or confederal solution to the country's political future and to the maintenance of separate group identities under white leadership with the rejection of power-sharing at every level.

The party contested the 1977 general election and won three seats in the House of Assembly, however, Streicher was defeated in his Cape Town constituency of Wynberg.

John Wiley became the party's new leader following the election. In parliament, the SAP supported the government during the 1979 Muldergate Scandal.

On 13 June 1980, SAP leader John Wiley announced that his party was disbanding and that its three MPs were joining the ruling National Party. Wiley served as Minister of Environmental Affairs and Tourism in P.W. Botha's government, and was the only cabinet minister of English descent, until his death in 1987 of a gunshot wound to the head. Wiley's death remains an unsolved case, although suicide had not been ruled out. His son, Mark Wiley, is a Democratic Alliance legislator in Western Cape province. Streicher was returned to the House of Assembly in 1981 as a National Party MP. He served from 1986 to 1989 as deputy minister of transportation and from 1994 to 1997 chairman of the National Party caucus in parliament.
