= Liberalism in South Africa =

Liberalism in South Africa has encompassed various traditions, social movements, and parties pursuing the adoption and establishment of liberalism in the country. Various South Africans have contributed prominently to liberalism in the country.

== History ==
=== Cape Colony: 1806-1910 ===
Liberalism in South Africa was preceded by Cape Liberalism, a political movement that shares core foundational values with mainstream Western liberalism (such as the belief in individual liberty, the rule of law, free speech, and free markets). Cape Liberalism, and later South African Liberalism, evolved to navigate a deeply divided, multiracial and multicultural society.

Cape liberalism and the individuals associated with it played a key role in the politics of the Cape Colony, with Liberal politicians and activists playing a significant part in the adoption of a non-racial Cape Qualified Franchise, free press, self-government through the Responsible Government movement, and the abolition of slavery in the colony.

=== South Africa: 1910 onward ===
From the foundation of the Union of South Africa, liberal ideas played a key role in ensuring certain political freedoms – including of speech and political participation – for the white population, whose own multiculturalism (particularly Afrikaner-British parity) it had guaranteed. Another key facet of liberalism in South Africa was advocacy for the reform or total abolition of apartheid. In the democratic era, liberalism lives on through the country's constitution, which features a far-reaching bill of rights, some separation of powers and checks and balances. It continues to be championed by some political parties, while the country's economic policy has features of liberalism despite being a mixed economy.

The moderate South African Party and its successor, the United Party, formed government several times between the formation of the Union and the election of the National Party in 1948. In 1959, members of the United Party formed the Progressive Party, a precursor to the present-day Democratic Alliance. Separately, in 1953, the anti-Apartheid and multi-racial Liberal Party of South Africa was formed, before disbanding in 1968.

Following the 2024 general elections, the liberal Democratic Alliance (DA) entered into a coalition with the African National Congress (ANC) and various other parties, breaking the ANC's dominance of national government since the end of apartheid.

=== Timeline ===
==== Cape Colony pre-party politics ====
Prior to the 1890s Cape politics did not have modern political parties and was instead dominated by individual politicians that cooperated informally.

- 1839: Scottish immigrant William Porter enters Cape politics.
- 1849: Scottish immigrant John Fairbairn enters Cape politics during the Convict Crisis.
- 1854: The Convict Crisis helps lead to the establishment of the first Cape parliament with notable liberal politicians elected such as Saul Solomon and his ally John Charles Molteno, both of whom would play a major role in the colony's future politics.
- 1869: Liberal politician and ally of Saul Soloman, John X. Merriman, enters Cape politics following the establishment of Responsible Government.
- 1896: William Schreiner founds the first incarnation of the South African Party in the Cape Colony, it would go on to be led by James Tennant Molteno then John X. Merriman.

==== Progressive Party to Unionist Party ====
- 1890: The Progressive Party was formed by Cecil John Rhodes, Alfred Milner and John Gordon Sprigg in an effort to challenge the political dominance of more established liberal politicians such as Theophilus Lyndall Schreiner and his brother William Schreiner.
- 1910: PP merged with the Constitutional Party from the Orange River Colony and the Progressives from the South African Republic to form the Unionist Party.
- 1920: The Unionist Party merged into the South African Party.

==== South African Party ====
- 1911: The South African Party was formed following the merger of various pre-Union parties including its name sake in the now dissolved Cape Colony. Led by the moderate Louis Botha, it formed the first government of a united South Africa. The party's support base included English-speaking white South Africans who developed a pattern of supporting the most moderate Afrikaner politicians to avoid domination. The party's own 'liberal' wing was led by Jan Hofmeyr.
- 1934: SAP merged into the United Party.

==== United Party ====
- 1934: The United Party was formed in response to the Great Depression, combining Jan Smuts' South African Party and most of Barry Hertzog's National Party.
- 1939: Hertzog left the party and a split formed following South Africa's entry into the Second World War. The party increasingly resembled the former South African Party.
- 1948: The United Party, led by Jan Smuts, lost in the 1948 election to the Reunited National Party. The United Party based its platform on the recommendations of the Fagan Commission, which determined total segregation to be impossible, and advocated a relaxation of restrictions on black African migration into urban areas. The Reunited National Party, conversely, had campaigned on total racial separation.
- 1960: Moderate National Party members formed the National Union.
- 1962: NU merged into the UP.
- 1973: Democratic Party broke away from the National Party.
- 1977: DP and UP formed the New Republic Party.
- 1987: NRP dissolved, many of their members went to the Independent Party.
- 1988: IP and NRP merged into the Democratic Party.

==== Liberal Party of South Africa ====
- 1953: The Liberal Party of South Africa was formed by Alan Paton & Peter Brown
- 1968: The SALP decided to disband rather than obey legislation outlawing multiracial political parties. The decision was also influenced by the fact that the leadership of the SALP had been decimated by banning orders and other restrictive measures, and by the fact that many stalwarts had been forced into exile.

==== Progressive Party to Democratic Alliance ====
- 1959: Liberal members of the United Party seceded and formed the liberal Progressive Party. The parliamentary party is led by Helen Suzman.
- 1975: The party merged with the Reform Party led by Harry Schwarz, a faction of the United Party, and became the Progressive Reform Party.
- 1977: After the dissolution of the United Party, former members merged into the PRP, which is renamed the Progressive Federal Party.
- 1987: National Party MP Wynand Malan quit the governing party to protest PW Botha's policies. South African Ambassador to the UK Denis Worrall quit his post in order to return to South Africa and fight apartheid. The two formed and led the liberal Independent Party.
- 1988: The PFP merged with the newly founded National Democratic Movement and the Independent Party into the Democratic Party.
- 2000: The DP merged with the conservative New National Party into an alliance, the Democratic Alliance.
- 2001: The NNP left the alliance and the DP continues as the present-day Democratic Alliance.
- 2024: The Democratic Alliance joins a Government of National Unity, forming a coalition with the African National Congress and other parties.

=== Mahlabatini Declaration ===
On 4 January 1974, Transvaal United Party leader Harry Schwarz met with Mangosuthu Buthelezi and signed a five-point plan for racial peace in South Africa, which came to be known as the Mahlabatini Declaration of Faith. Its purpose was to provide a blueprint for the government of South Africa by consent and racial peace in a multi-racial society, stressing opportunity for all, consultation, the federal concept, and a bill of rights. It also affirmed that political change must take place though non-violent means, at a time when neither the National Party nor the African National Congress were looking to peaceful solutions or dialogue. The declaration enshrined the principles of peaceful transition of power and equality for all, the first of such agreements by acknowledged black and white political leaders in South Africa and was heralded by many as a breakthrough in race relations in South Africa. Liberal figures and others such as Alan Paton praised the declaration. The declaration drew much media interest both inside and outside South Africa. Schwarz, leader of the liberal 'Young Turks' in the UP, would be expelled with other liberals from the party the following year.

== Prominent individuals ==
=== Politics ===
- Liberal politicians in the Cape Colony: William Schreiner, James Tennant Molteno, John X. Merriman, William Porter, John Fairbairn, Saul Solomon, and John Charles Molteno. John C. Molteno, Schreiner, and Merriman served as Prime Ministers of the Cape Colony.
- South African Party (Cape Colony): William Schreiner, James Tennant Molteno, John X. Merriman.
- South African Party: Louis Botha, Jan Smuts, Jan Hofmeyr. Botha and Smuts were the first and second Prime Ministers of South Africa respectively
- United Party: Harry Schwarz, Jan Smuts
- Liberal Party of South Africa: Alan Paton, Peter Brown
- Progressive Party: Jan Steytler, Colin Eglin, Bernard Friedman, Helen Suzman
- Reform Party: Harry Schwarz
- Progressive Reform and Progressive Federal Party: Colin Eglin, Frederik van Zyl Slabbert, Harry Schwarz, Zach de Beer
- Independent Party: Denis Worrall, Wynand Malan
- Democratic Party: Denis Worrall, Harry Schwarz Wynand Malan, Zach de Beer, Tony Leon, Sipho Moganedi (first black Democratic Party Youth national president, 1995 to 1998)
- Democratic Alliance: Tony Leon, Helen Zille, Mmusi Maimane, John Steenhuisen
- Liberal Party (UK): Percy Molteno (politician, businessman and philanthropist; very involved in early South African politics including the establishment of the ANC).

=== Academia ===
- Donald Barkly Molteno (1908–1972)
- Edgar Brookes (1897–1979)

=== Media and literature ===
- Thomas Pringle (1789 – 1834), writer, journalist, newspaper editor, poet, and abolitionist
- Author Alan Paton (1903–1988)
- Laurence Gandar (1915–1998), editor of the liberal daily the Rand Daily Mail in Johannesburg from 1957 to 1969
- Barry Streek (1948–2006), political journalist

=== Religion ===
- South African Council of Churches (SACC): Beyers Naudé

== Liberal organisations ==
- Helen Suzman Foundation
- South African Institute of Race Relations
- Black Sash
- Free Market Foundation

== See also ==
- Federalism in South Africa

== See also ==
- History of South Africa
- Politics of South Africa
- List of political parties in South Africa
