= Wynberg (House of Assembly of South Africa constituency) =

- Former constituency for the South African House of Assembly
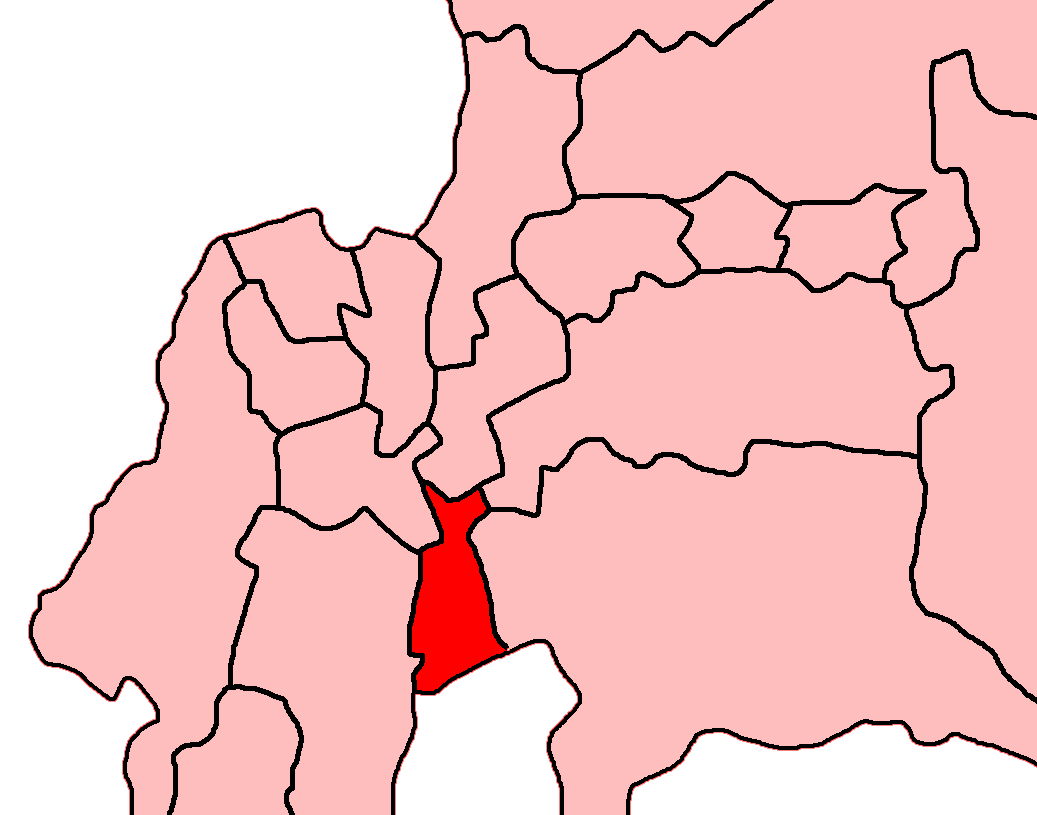
- Location of Wynberg within Cape Town (1981)
- Province: Cape of Good Hope
- Electorate: 17,319 (1989)

Former constituency
- Created: 1929
- Abolished: 1994
- Number of members: 1
- Last MHA: Robin Carlisle (DP)
- Replaced by: Western Cape

Wynberg was a constituency in the Cape Province of South Africa, which existed from 1929 to 1994. It covered parts of the southern suburbs of Cape Town, centred on its namesake suburb of Wynberg. Throughout its existence it elected one member to the House of Assembly and one to the Cape Provincial Council.

== Franchise notes ==
When the Union of South Africa was formed in 1910, the electoral qualifications in use in each pre-existing colony were kept in place. The Cape Colony had implemented a "colour-blind" franchise known as the Cape Qualified Franchise, which included all adult literate men owning more than £75 worth of property (controversially raised from £25 in 1892), and this initially remained in effect after the colony became the Cape Province. As of 1908, 22,784 out of 152,221 electors in the Cape Colony were "Native or Coloured". Eligibility to serve in Parliament and the Provincial Council, however, was restricted to whites from 1910 onward.

The first challenge to the Cape Qualified Franchise came with the Women's Enfranchisement Act, 1930 and the Franchise Laws Amendment Act, 1931, which extended the vote to women and removed property qualifications for the white population only – non-white voters remained subject to the earlier restrictions. In 1936, the Representation of Natives Act removed all black voters from the common electoral roll and introduced three "Native Representative Members", white MPs elected by the black voters of the province and meant to represent their interests in particular. A similar provision was made for Coloured voters with the Separate Representation of Voters Act, 1951, and although this law was challenged by the courts, it went into effect in time for the 1958 general election, which was thus held with all-white voter rolls for the first time in South African history. The all-white franchise would continue until the end of apartheid and the introduction of universal suffrage in 1994.

== History ==
As in most of Cape Town’s southern suburbs, Wynberg’s electorate was largely English-speaking, affluent and liberal. For most of its history, it was a safe seat for the United Party, which held it with a succession of candidates from its creation until 1977. In that year, it saw a close three-cornered contest between the UP’s successors – the New Republic Party, the South African Party (whose leader, former Port Elizabeth MP Myburgh Streicher, was the local candidate) and the Progressive Federal Party, with the latter narrowly coming out victorious. P. A. Myburgh held the seat for the PFP in 1981, but in 1987, it was narrowly won for the National Party by David Graaff, son of former United Party leader De Villiers Graaff. His victory was short-lived, however, as the Democratic Party won the seat back in 1989, and held it until its abolition.

== Members ==
Election	Member	Party
1929	E. R. Roper	South African
1933	J. B. Robinson	Independent
1938	Alfred Friedlander	United
1943	W. R. Butters	United
1948	W. R. Butters	United
1953	J. H. Russell	United
1958	J. H. Russell	United
1961	J. H. Russell	United
1963 by	Catherine Taylor	United
1966	Catherine Taylor	United
1970	Catherine Taylor	United
1974	J. I. de Villiers	United
1977	P. A. Myburgh	PFP
1981	P. A. Myburgh	PFP
1987	David Graaff	National
1989	Robin Carlisle	Democratic
1994	constituency abolished	

== Detailed results ==
=== Elections in the 1920s ===
General election 1929: Wynberg
Party	Candidate	Votes	%	±%
South African	E. R. Roper	1,905	69.4	New
Labour (N.C.)	W. A. Costello	624	22.7	New
Independent	L. Lewe	185	6.7	New
Rejected ballots		33	1.2	N/A
Majority		1,281	46.7	N/A
Turnout		2,747	70.7	N/A
South African win (new seat)				

=== Elections in the 1930s ===
General election 1933: Wynberg
Party	Candidate	Votes	%	±%
Independent	J. B. Robinson	1,992	39.5	New
South African	J. W. Allen	1,578	31.3	−38.1
Independent	W. J. Laite	1,424	28.2	New
Rejected ballots		50	1.0	-0.2
Majority		414	8.2	N/A
Turnout		5,044	73.9	+3.2
Independent gain from South African		Swing	N/A	

General election 1938: Wynberg
Party	Candidate	Votes	%	±%
United	Alfred Friedlander	3,152	51.6	+20.3
Independent	J. B. Robinson	2,498	40.9	+1.4
Socialist	J. Copeland	409	6.7	New
Rejected ballots		50	0.8	-0.2
Majority		414	8.2	N/A
Turnout		6,109	76.9	+3.0
United gain from Independent		Swing	+9.5	

=== Elections in the 1940s ===
General election 1943: Wynberg
Party	Candidate	Votes	%	±%
United	W. R. Butters	Unopposed		
United hold				
