= Berea (House of Assembly of South Africa constituency) =

- Former constituency for the South African House of Assembly
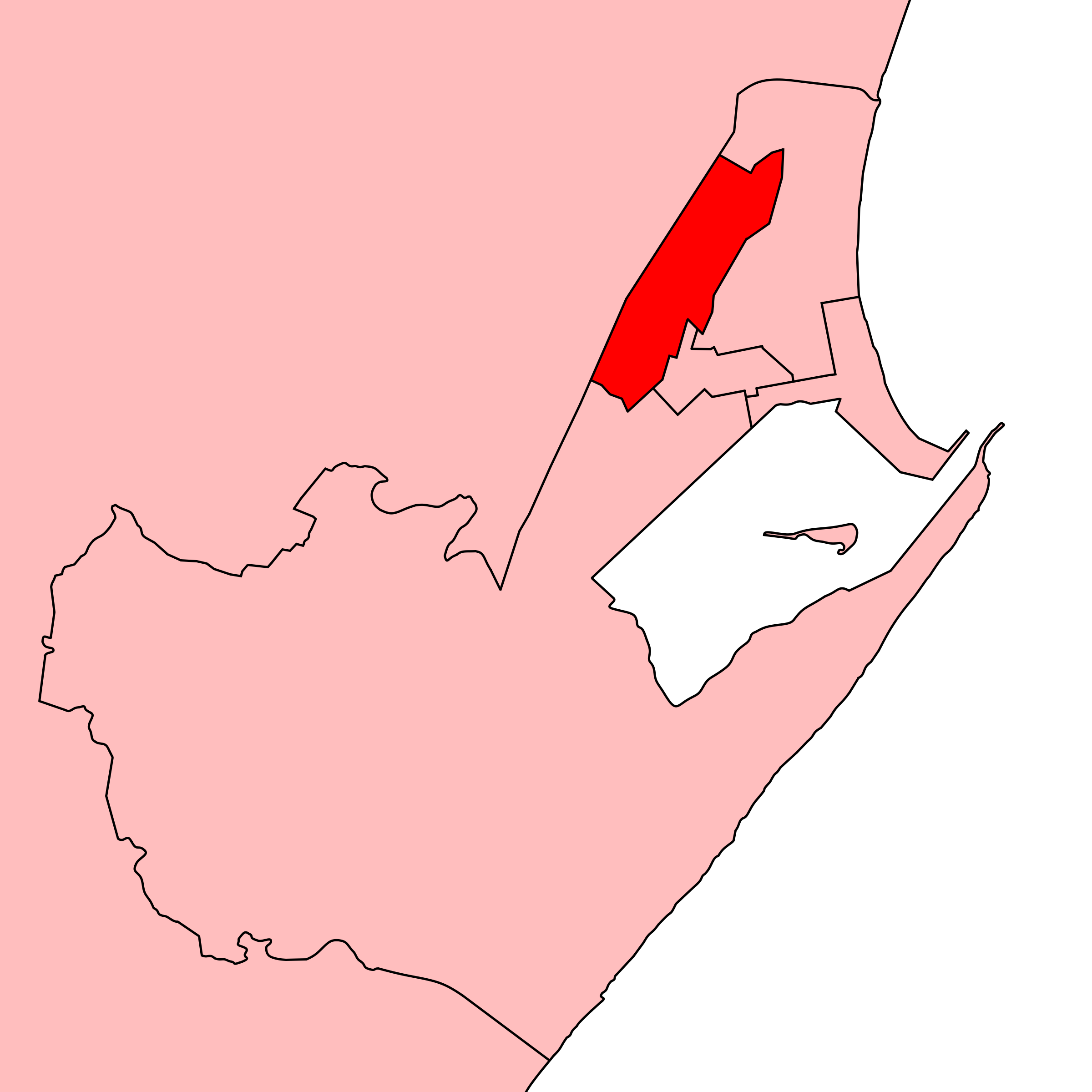
- Location of Berea within Durban (1910)
- Province: Natal
- Electorate: 17,253 (1989)

Former constituency
- Created: 1910; 1938
- Abolished: 1933; 1994
- Number of members: 1
- Last MHA: Denis Worrall (DP)
- Replaced by: KwaZulu-Natal

Berea, known as Durban Berea (Afrikaans: Durban-Berea) until 1966, was a constituency in the Natal Province of South Africa, which existed from 1910 to 1994 with the exception of the 1933 general election. It covered parts of the inner west of Durban, centred on its namesake suburb. Throughout its existence it elected one member to the House of Assembly.

== Franchise notes ==
When the Union of South Africa was formed in 1910, the electoral qualifications in use in each pre-existing colony were kept in place. The franchise used in the Natal Colony, while theoretically not restricted by race, was significantly less liberal than that of the Cape, and no more than a few hundred non-white electors ever qualified. In 1908, an estimated 200 of the 22,786 electors in the colony were of non-European descent, and by 1935, only one remained. By 1958, when the last non-white voters in the Cape were taken off the rolls, Natal too had an all-white electorate. The franchise was also restricted by property and education qualifications until the 1933 general election, following the passage of the Women's Enfranchisement Act, 1930 and the Franchise Laws Amendment Act, 1931. From then on, the franchise was given to all white citizens aged 21 or over, which remained the case until the end of apartheid and the introduction of universal suffrage in 1994.

== History ==
Like the rest of Durban, Berea was a largely English-speaking seat. The Berea area is known as one of Durban's wealthiest, and it was the only one of the city's original six constituencies never to elect a Labour MP. Its first MP was James Henderson, who was first elected as an independent (Natal having had no party system before Union), and later represented first the Unionist and then the South African Party. Henderson represented the seat until 1929, and his successor and party colleague John Williamson would only serve for one term before the constituency was abolished in 1933.

Its abolition was short-lived, returning for the very next election in 1938, and at that point, like several other Natal seats, it was taken by the Dominion Party, a pro-British conservative party formed by the faction opposing the SAP's merger into the Hertzog-led United Party. When Hertzog resigned in 1939, the Dominion Party lost its primary raison d'être, and at the 1943 general election, Berea's Dominion Party MP, Edward Cecil Hooper, lost decisively to independent (later UP member) Joseph Richard Sullivan. From that point on, Berea was a safe seat for the UP, which held it under a succession of MPs until its dissolution in 1977. After the UP's disappearance, Berea became a marginal seat that saw fierce contests between its two successors, the conservative New Republic Party and the liberal Progressive Federal Party. The NRP won the seat in 1977, then lost it to the PFP in 1981, and the PFP held it in 1987. In 1989, the PFP merged with a number of smaller parties to form the Democratic Party, and the leader of one of these smaller factions, Denis Worrall, was selected to contest Berea for the new party. Worrall was on the conservative end of the DP, having previously served as a senator for the governing National Party, and he was able to reunite the NRP and PFP voter bases to win the seat handily, representing it until its final abolition in 1994.

== Members ==
Election	Member	Party
1910	James Henderson	Independent
1915	James Henderson	Unionist
1920	James Henderson	Unionist
1921	James Henderson	South African
1924	James Henderson	South African
1929	John Williamson	South African
1933	Constituency abolished	

Election	Member	Party
1938	E. C. Hooper	Dominion
1943	J. R. Sullivan	Independent
1948	J. R. Sullivan	United Party
1953	J. R. Sullivan	United Party
1953 by	R. R. Butcher	United Party
1958	R. R. Butcher	United Party
1961	L. F. Wood	United Party
1966	L. F. Wood	United Party
1970	L. F. Wood	United Party
1974	L. F. Wood	United Party
1977	N. B. Wood	New Republic
1981	R. A. F. Swart	PFP
1987	R. A. F. Swart	PFP
1989	Denis Worrall	Democratic
1994	Constituency abolished	

== Detailed results ==
=== Elections in the 1910s ===
General election 1910: Durban Berea
Party	Candidate	Votes	%	±%
Independent	James Henderson	Unopposed		
Independent win (new seat)				

General election 1915: Durban Berea
Party	Candidate	Votes	%	±%
Unionist	James Henderson	Unopposed		
Unionist hold				

=== Elections in the 1920s ===
General election 1920: Durban Berea
Party	Candidate	Votes	%	±%
Unionist	James Henderson	779	65.0	N/A
Labour	G. Jones	419	35.0	New
Majority		360	30.0	N/A
Turnout		1,198	50.9	N/A
Unionist hold		Swing	N/A	

General election 1921: Durban Berea
Party	Candidate	Votes	%	±%
South African	James Henderson	1,025	75.7	+10.7
Labour	G. Jones	329	24.3	−10.7
Majority		696	51.4	+21.4
Turnout		1,354	52.0	+1.1
South African hold		Swing	+10.7	

General election 1924: Durban Berea
Party	Candidate	Votes	%	±%
South African	James Henderson	1,267	71.3	−4.4
Labour	A. H. Haycock	506	28.5	+4.2
Rejected ballots		4	0.2	N/A
Majority		696	42.8	−8.6
Turnout		1,777	81.4	+29.4
South African hold		Swing	-4.3	

General election 1929: Durban Berea
Party	Candidate	Votes	%	±%
South African	John Williamson	1,047	52.6	−18.7
Ind. South African	J. T. Oliff	938	47.1	New
Rejected ballots		7	0.3	+0.1
Majority		109	5.5	N/A
Turnout		1,992	70.7	−10.7
South African hold		Swing	N/A	

=== Elections in the 1930s ===
General election 1938: Durban Berea
Party	Candidate	Votes	%	±%
Dominion	E. C. Hooper	2,696	49.3	New
United	T. M. Wadley	2,439	44.6	New
Independent	J. T. Oliff	302	5.5	New
Rejected ballots		27	0.6	N/A
Majority		257	4.7	N/A
Turnout		5,464	77.7	N/A
Dominion win (new seat)				
