= Walmer (House of Assembly of South Africa constituency) =

- Former constituency for the South African House of Assembly
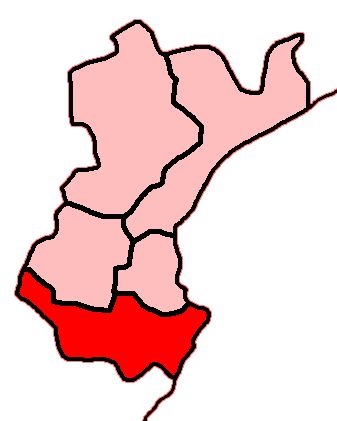
- Location of Walmer within Port Elizabeth (1981)
- Province: Cape of Good Hope
- Electorate: 18,174 (1989)

Former constituency
- Created: 1966
- Abolished: 1994
- Number of members: 1
- Last MHA: Bob Rogers (DP)
- Replaced by: Eastern Cape

Walmer was a constituency in the Cape Province of South Africa, which existed from 1966 to 1994. It covered the southern suburbs of Port Elizabeth (now Gqeberha), centred on its namesake suburb of Walmer. Throughout its existence it elected one member to the House of Assembly and one to the Cape Provincial Council.

== Franchise notes ==
When the Union of South Africa was formed in 1910, the electoral qualifications in use in each pre-existing colony were kept in place. The Cape Colony had implemented a "colour-blind" franchise known as the Cape Qualified Franchise, which included all adult literate men owning more than £75 worth of property (controversially raised from £25 in 1892), and this initially remained in effect after the colony became the Cape Province. As of 1908, 22,784 out of 152,221 electors in the Cape Colony were "Native or Coloured". Eligibility to serve in Parliament and the Provincial Council, however, was restricted to whites from 1910 onward.

The first challenge to the Cape Qualified Franchise came with the Women's Enfranchisement Act, 1930 and the Franchise Laws Amendment Act, 1931, which extended the vote to women and removed property qualifications for the white population only – non-white voters remained subject to the earlier restrictions. In 1936, the Representation of Natives Act removed all black voters from the common electoral roll and introduced three "Native Representative Members", white MPs elected by the black voters of the province and meant to represent their interests in particular. A similar provision was made for Coloured voters with the Separate Representation of Voters Act, 1951, and although this law was challenged by the courts, it went into effect in time for the 1958 general election, which was thus held with all-white voter rolls for the first time in South African history. The all-white franchise would continue until the end of apartheid and the introduction of universal suffrage in 1994.

== History ==
Walmer was largely created out of the abolished seat of Port Elizabeth South, and like that seat, it was a stronghold of the opposition United Party. Its MP from 1974 to 1981, Theodore Aronson, joined fellow Port Elizabeth MP Myburgh Streicher’s South African Party on the UP’s dissolution in 1977, and unlike Streicher, retained his seat in that year’s general election. In 1981, however, the seat fell to Andrew Savage of the Progressive Federal Party, which lost the seat to the National Party in 1987 but regained it in 1989, the last election held under first-past-the-post.

== Members ==
Election	Member	Party
1966	W. G. Kingwill	United
1970	W. G. Kingwill	United
1974	T. Aronson	United
1977	T. Aronson	South African
1977	T. Aronson	South African
1981	A. Savage	PFP
1987	S. J. Schoeman	National
1989	Bob Rogers	Democratic
1994	constituency abolished	
