= Groote Schuur (House of Assembly of South Africa constituency) =

- Former constituency for the South African House of Assembly
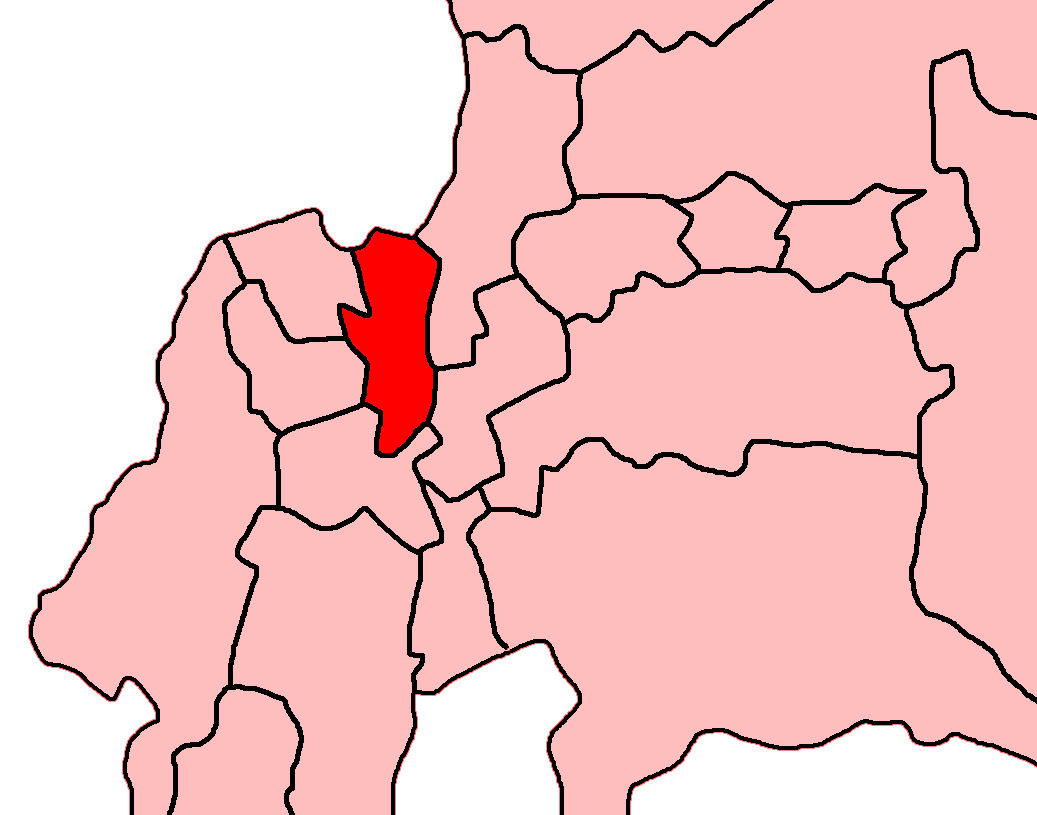
- Location of Groote Schuur within Cape Town (1981)
- Province: Cape of Good Hope
- Electorate: 14,824 (1989)

Former constituency
- Created: 1974
- Abolished: 1994
- Number of members: 1
- Last MHA: Dene Smuts (DP)
- Created from: Rondebosch; Salt River
- Replaced by: Western Cape

Groote Schuur was a constituency in the Cape Province of South Africa, which existed from 1974 to 1994. Named for the then-Prime Ministerial residence and former estate of Cecil Rhodes, the seat covered parts of the inner southern suburbs of Cape Town around the University of Cape Town campus. Throughout its existence it elected one member to the House of Assembly and one to the Cape Provincial Council.

== Franchise notes ==
When the Union of South Africa was formed in 1910, the electoral qualifications in use in each pre-existing colony were kept in place. The Cape Colony had implemented a "colour-blind" franchise known as the Cape Qualified Franchise, which included all adult literate men owning more than £75 worth of property (controversially raised from £25 in 1892), and this initially remained in effect after the colony became the Cape Province. As of 1908, 22,784 out of 152,221 electors in the Cape Colony were "Native or Coloured". Eligibility to serve in Parliament and the Provincial Council, however, was restricted to whites from 1910 onward.

The first challenge to the Cape Qualified Franchise came with the Women's Enfranchisement Act, 1930 and the Franchise Laws Amendment Act, 1931, which extended the vote to women and removed property qualifications for the white population only – non-white voters remained subject to the earlier restrictions. In 1936, the Representation of Natives Act removed all black voters from the common electoral roll and introduced three "Native Representative Members", white MPs elected by the black voters of the province and meant to represent their interests in particular. A similar provision was made for Coloured voters with the Separate Representation of Voters Act, 1951, and although this law was challenged by the courts, it went into effect in time for the 1958 general election, which was thus held with all-white voter rolls for the first time in South African history. The all-white franchise would continue until the end of apartheid and the introduction of universal suffrage in 1994.

== History ==
Groote Schuur was created in 1974 out of parts of Rondebosch and the abolished Salt River constituency. Like much of Cape Town's southern suburbs, its electorate was largely English-speaking, affluent and liberal. Its first MP was De Villiers Graaff, leader of the opposition United Party, who had formerly represented Rondebosch – upon his retirement in 1977, the seat was won by the Progressive Federal Party, the more liberal of the UP's two successor parties. It would be held by the PFP, and its successor the Democratic Party, until its abolition in 1994.

== Members ==
Election	Member	Party
1974	De Villiers Graaff	United
1977	B. R. Bamford	PFP
1981	B. R. Bamford	PFP
1987	D. P. de K. van Gend	PFP
1989	Dene Smuts	Democratic
1994	constituency abolished	
