= Amanzimtoti (House of Assembly of South Africa constituency) =

- Former constituency for the South African House of Assembly
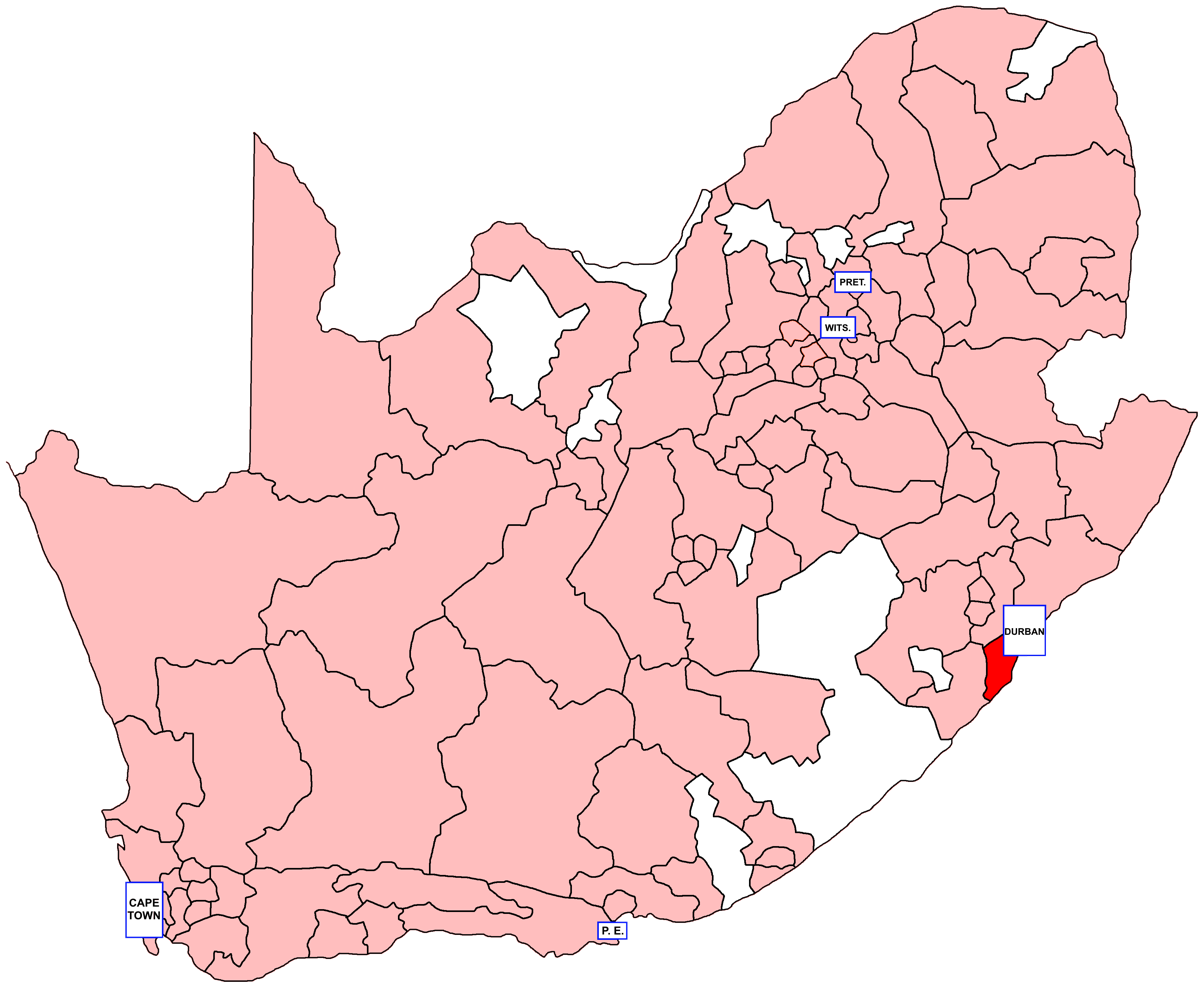
- Location of Amanzimtoti within South Africa (1981)
- Province: Natal
- Electorate: 20,087 (1989)

Former constituency
- Created: 1974
- Abolished: 1994
- Number of members: 1
- Last MHA: G. S. Bartlett (NP)
- Replaced by: KwaZulu-Natal

Amanzimtoti was a constituency in the Natal Province of South Africa, which existed from 1974 to 1994. Centred on its namesake town and river, it covered a semi-rural area south and west of Durban. Throughout its existence it elected one member to the House of Assembly.

== Franchise notes ==
When the Union of South Africa was formed in 1910, the electoral qualifications in use in each pre-existing colony were kept in place. The franchise used in the Natal Colony, while theoretically not restricted by race, was significantly less liberal than that of the Cape, and no more than a few hundred non-white electors ever qualified. In 1908, an estimated 200 of the 22,786 electors in the colony were of non-European descent, and by 1935, only one remained. By 1958, when the last non-white voters in the Cape were taken off the rolls, Natal too had an all-white electorate. The franchise was also restricted by property and education qualifications until the 1933 general election, following the passage of the Women's Enfranchisement Act, 1930 and the Franchise Laws Amendment Act, 1931. From then on, the franchise was given to all white citizens aged 21 or over, which remained the case until the end of apartheid and the introduction of universal suffrage in 1994.

== History ==
Amanzimtoti's electorate, like that of Natal generally, was largely English-speaking and conservative, and its only MP, George Shepstone Bartlett, exemplified this tendency. He was first elected for the opposition United Party in 1974, and when that party dissolved three years later, he and several other Natal conservatives formed the New Republic Party. The NRP's success was limited outside Natal, but Bartlett held his seat under that label both in 1977 and 1981, before defecting to the governing National Party sometime before the 1987 general election. The NP had been the main opposition to Bartlett throughout the seat's existence, and with his defection it became a reasonably safe seat for the governing party.

== Members ==
Election	Member	Party
1974	G. S. Bartlett	United
1977	G. S. Bartlett	NRP
1981	G. S. Bartlett	NRP
1987	G. S. Bartlett	National
1989	G. S. Bartlett	National
1994	constituency abolished	
