= East London North (House of Assembly of South Africa constituency) =

- Oos-Londen-Noord
- Former constituency for the South African House of Assembly
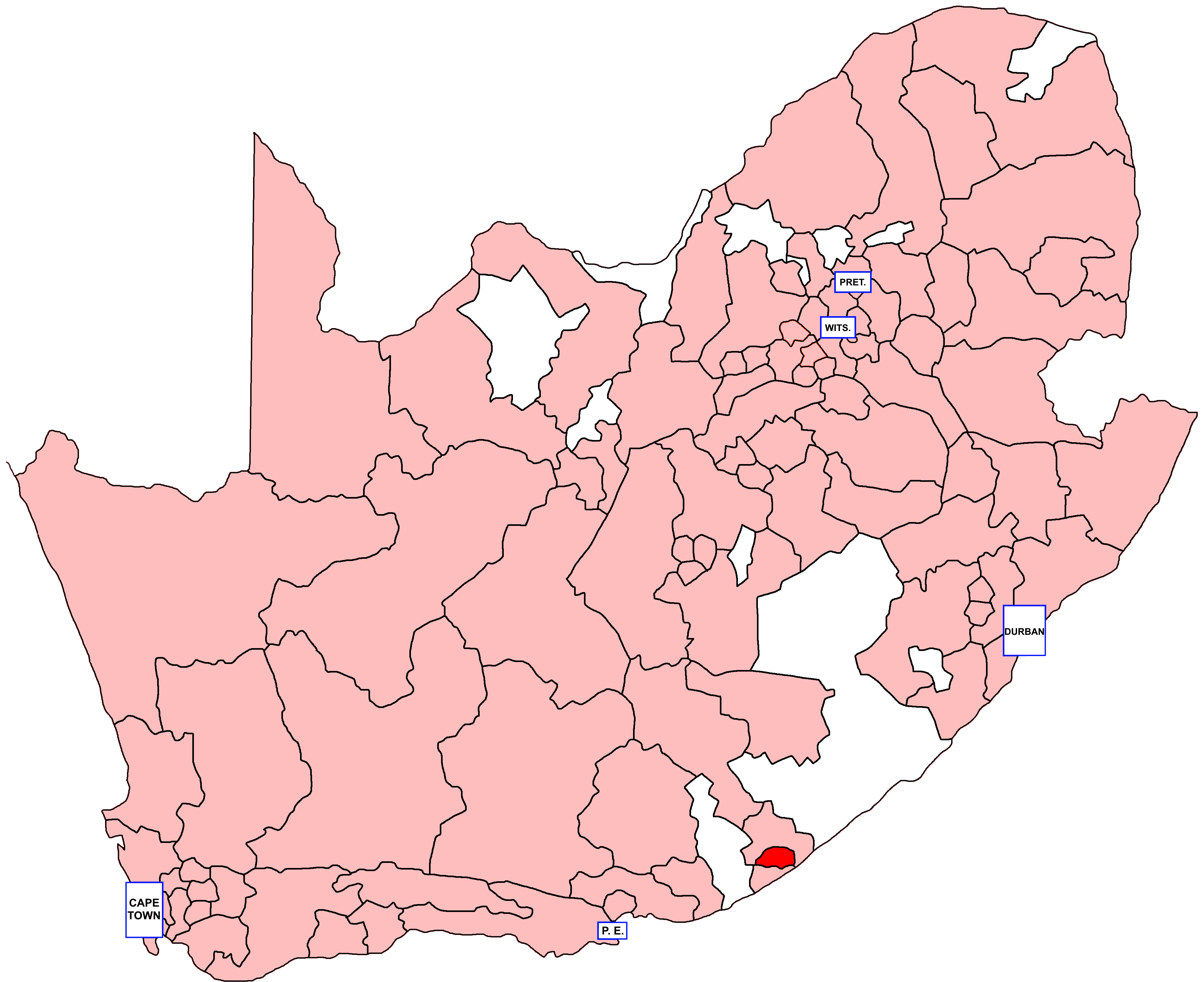
- Location of East London North within South Africa (1981)
- Province: Cape of Good Hope
- Electorate: 16,198 (1989)

Former constituency
- Created: 1924
- Abolished: 1994
- Number of members: 1
- Last MHA: C. J. W. Badenhorst (NP)
- Created from: Border
- Replaced by: Eastern Cape

East London North (Afrikaans: Oos-Londen-Noord) was a constituency in the Cape Province of South Africa, which existed from 1924 to 1994. The seat covered the suburban and rural area surrounding the city of East London. Throughout its existence it elected one member to the House of Assembly and one to the Cape Provincial Council.

== Franchise notes ==
When the Union of South Africa was formed in 1910, the electoral qualifications in use in each pre-existing colony were kept in place. The Cape Colony had implemented a "colour-blind" franchise known as the Cape Qualified Franchise, which included all adult literate men owning more than £75 worth of property (controversially raised from £25 in 1892), and this initially remained in effect after the colony became the Cape Province. As of 1908, 22,784 out of 152,221 electors in the Cape Colony were "Native or Coloured". Eligibility to serve in Parliament and the Provincial Council, however, was restricted to whites from 1910 onward.

The first challenge to the Cape Qualified Franchise came with the Women's Enfranchisement Act, 1930 and the Franchise Laws Amendment Act, 1931, which extended the vote to women and removed property qualifications for the white population only – non-white voters remained subject to the earlier restrictions. In 1936, the Representation of Natives Act removed all black voters from the common electoral roll and introduced three "Native Representative Members", white MPs elected by the black voters of the province and meant to represent their interests in particular. A similar provision was made for Coloured voters with the Separate Representation of Voters Act, 1951, and although this law was challenged by the courts, it went into effect in time for the 1958 general election, which was thus held with all-white voter rolls for the first time in South African history. The all-white franchise would continue until the end of apartheid and the introduction of universal suffrage in 1994.

== History ==
East London North, like much of the Eastern Cape, was a stronghold of the pro-British side of South African politics and had a largely English-speaking electorate. When it was created in 1924, it largely replaced the abolished seat of Border, and Border MP John Joseph Byron was elected to represent the new seat. He remained in office until 1935, at which point the seat was won by the Dominion Party, a conservative pro-British party who never held another seat outside Natal. In 1946, East London North was retaken by the United Party, which would hold it with a succession of short-lived MPs for the next thirty years. On the UP’s dissolution in 1977, the seat was briefly won by the New Republic Party, another conservative English-speaking party with little presence outside Natal, which however lost it again in 1981 in a tight three-way race against the Nationals and PFP. The National Party would hold East London North for the remainder of its existence.

== Members ==
Election	Member	Party
1924	J. J. Byron	South African
1929	J. J. Byron	South African
1933	J. J. Byron	South African
1934	J. J. Byron	United
1935 by	R. M. Christopher	Dominion
1938	R. M. Christopher	Dominion
1943	R. M. Christopher	Dominion
1946 by	D. J. Gale	United
1948	D. J. Gale	United
1951 by	C. E. Cock	United
1953	H. F. T. Malcomess	United
1957 by	Clive van Ryneveld	United
1958	Clive van Ryneveld	United
1959	Clive van Ryneveld	Progressive
1961	A. N. Field	United
1966	C. J. S. Wainwright	United
1970	C. J. S. Wainwright	United
1974	C. J. S. Wainwright	United
1977	D. J. N. Malcomess	NRP
1981	H. S. Coetzer	National
1987	C. J. W. Badenhorst	National
1989	C. J. W. Badenhorst	National
1994	constituency abolished	

== Detailed results ==
=== Elections in the 1920s ===
General election 1924: East London North
Party	Candidate	Votes	%	±%
South African	J. J. Byron	1,628	58.7	New
Labour	W. L. Plyman	1,110	40.0	New
Rejected ballots		38	1.3	N/A
Majority		518	18.7	N/A
Turnout		2,776	80.2	N/A
South African win (new seat)				

General election 1929: East London North
Party	Candidate	Votes	%	±%
South African	J. J. Byron	1,839	60.8	+2.1
National	H. G. J. van Rensburg	1,131	37.4	New
Rejected ballots		53	1.8	+0.5
Majority		708	23.4	N/A
Turnout		3,023	79.3	−0.9
South African hold		Swing	N/A	

=== Elections in the 1930s ===
General election 1933: East London North
Party	Candidate	Votes	%	±%
South African	J. J. Byron	Unopposed		
South African hold				

East London North by-election, 17 April 1935
Party	Candidate	Votes	%	±%
Dominion	R. M. Christopher	3,135	50.5	New
United	N. O. Norton	2,586	41.6	N/A
Labour	W. L. Plyman	411	6.6	New
Rejected ballots		78	1.3	N/A
Majority		549	8.8	N/A
Turnout		6,210	80.3	N/A
Dominion gain from United		Swing	N/A	

General election 1938: East London North
Party	Candidate	Votes	%	±%
Dominion	R. M. Christopher	3,395	50.4	New
United	W. J. Klerck	3,311	49.1	−22.5
Rejected ballots		36	0.5	N/A
Majority		84	1.2	N/A
Turnout		6,742	81.3	N/A
Dominion gain from United		Swing	N/A	

=== Elections in the 1940s ===
General election 1943: East London North
Party	Candidate	Votes	%	±%
Dominion	R. M. Christopher	5,743	75.9	+25.3
Independent	A. W. Louw	1,319	17.4	New
South African Communist Party	A. O. Muller	344	4.5	New
Independent	C. E. W. Shoekel	160	2.1	New
Majority		4,424	58.5	N/A
Turnout		7,566	70.1	−10.7
Dominion hold		Swing	N/A	

East London North by-election, 17 December 1946
Party	Candidate	Votes	%	±%
United	D. J. Gale	Unopposed		
United gain from Dominion				

General election 1948: East London North
Party	Candidate	Votes	%	±%
United	D. J. Gale	6,931	77.5	New
SA Party	H. R. Abercrombie	2,016	22.5	New
Majority		4,915	55.0	N/A
Turnout		8,947	79.1	+9.0
United gain from Dominion		Swing	N/A	
