= Zululand (House of Assembly of South Africa constituency) =

Coordinates: 28.347°S 31.774°E

- Zoeloeland
- Former constituency for the South African House of Assembly
- Province: Natal
- Electorate: 13,044 (1970)

Former constituency
- Created: 1910
- Abolished: 1974
- Number of members: 1
- Last MHA: Radclyffe Cadman (UP)
- Replaced by: Umhlatuzana

Zululand (Afrikaans: Zoeloeland) was a constituency in the Natal Province of South Africa, which existed from 1910 to 1994. It covered a region of northeastern Natal roughly coterminous with the former Zulu Kingdom, after which it was named. Throughout its existence it elected one member to the House of Assembly.

== Franchise notes ==
When the Union of South Africa was formed in 1910, the electoral qualifications in use in each pre-existing colony were kept in place. The franchise used in the Colony of Natal, while theoretically not restricted by race, was significantly less liberal than that of the Cape, and no more than a few hundred non-white electors ever qualified. In 1908, an estimated 200 of the 22,786 electors in the colony were of non-European descent, and by 1935, only one remained. By 1958, when the last non-white voters in the Cape were taken off the rolls, Natal too had an all-white electorate. The franchise was also restricted by property and education qualifications until the 1933 general election, following the passage of the Women's Enfranchisement Act, 1930 and the Franchise Laws Amendment Act, 1931. From then on, the franchise was given to all white citizens aged 21 or over, which remained the case until the end of apartheid and the introduction of universal suffrage in 1994.

== History ==
As in most of Natal, Zululand's electorate was largely English-speaking and conservative. Its longest-serving MP was George Heaton Nicholls, a British-born former soldier and colonial administrator who had set up a sugar plantation in the area following the end of his civil service career. Nicholls resigned from his seat upon being elected to the Senate in 1939, and the resulting by-election was won by former Berea MP Leif Egeland, like Nicholls a member of the United Party. For most of its existence, Zululand was a UP stronghold - in 1948, when so many other rural seats fell to the National Party, they didn't even contest Zululand, and when they finally did in 1953, they got barely over a quarter of the vote. The constituency voted against a republic in the 1960 referendum by almost a two-thirds margin, but the UP's hold on it would soon begin to slip, and in 1966, it elected a Nationalist MP for the first and only time. The UP retook it in 1970, and held it until its abolition in 1974. Its final MP, Radclyffe Cadman, was a member of the UP's conservative wing, and would later become leader of the New Republic Party.

== Members ==
Election	Member	Party
1910	W. F. Clayton	Independent
1915	W. F. Clayton	South African
1920	George Heaton Nicholls	South African
1921	George Heaton Nicholls	South African
1924	George Heaton Nicholls	South African
1929	George Heaton Nicholls	South African
1933	George Heaton Nicholls	South African
1934	George Heaton Nicholls	United
1938	George Heaton Nicholls	United
1940 by	Leif Egeland	United
1943	J. W. H. Morris	United
1946 by	A. W. S. Mortifee	United
1948	A. W. S. Mortifee	United
1953	Ray Swart	United
1958	Ray Swart	United
1959	Ray Swart	Progressive
1961	Radclyffe Cadman	United
1966	Benjamin Pienaar	National
1970	Radclyffe Cadman	United
1974	Constituency abolished	

== Detailed results ==
=== Elections in the 1910s ===
General election 1910: Zululand
Party	Candidate	Votes	%	±%
Independent	W. F. Clayton	543	56.3	New
South African	A. E. Brunner	422	43.7	New
Majority		121	12.6	N/A
Independent win (new seat)				

General election 1915: Zululand
Party	Candidate	Votes	%	±%
South African	W. F. Clayton	991	78.6	+22.3
National	E. E. Dalton	270	21.4	New
Majority		721	57.2	N/A
Turnout		1,261	59.2	N/A
South African hold		Swing	N/A	

=== Elections in the 1920s ===
General election 1920: Zululand
Party	Candidate	Votes	%	±%
South African	George Heaton Nicholls	914	82.8	+4.2
National	P. J. Meyer	190	17.2	−4.2
Majority		724	65.6	N/A
Turnout		1,261	59.2	N/A
South African hold		Swing	N/A	

General election 1921: Zululand
Party	Candidate	Votes	%	±%
South African	George Heaton Nicholls	920	83.9	+1.1
National	W. H. Harris	177	16.1	−1.1
Majority		743	67.8	+2.2
Turnout		1,097	55.5	−3.7
South African hold		Swing	+1.1	

General election 1924: Zululand
Party	Candidate	Votes	%	±%
South African	George Heaton Nicholls	859	71.8	−12.1
National	J. H. F. Boshoff	327	27.3	+11.2
Rejected ballots		11	0.9	N/A
Majority		532	44.5	−23.3
Turnout		1,197	66.6	+11.1
South African hold		Swing	-11.7	

General election 1929: Zululand
Party	Candidate	Votes	%	±%
South African	George Heaton Nicholls	Unopposed		
South African hold				

=== Elections in the 1930s ===
General election 1933: Zululand
Party	Candidate	Votes	%	±%
South African	George Heaton Nicholls	Unopposed		
South African hold				

General election 1938: Zululand
Party	Candidate	Votes	%	±%
United	George Heaton Nicholls	2,533	58.1	N/A
Dominion	F. H. Palairet	1,816	41.6	New
Rejected ballots		14	0.3	N/A
Majority		717	16.4	N/A
Turnout		4,363	81.7	N/A
United hold		Swing	N/A	

=== Elections in the 1940s ===
Zululand by-election, 24 January 1940
Party	Candidate	Votes	%	±%
United	Leif Egeland	3,226	92.4	+34.3
Independent	E. J. V. Grantham	239	6.8	New
Rejected ballots		27	0.8	+0.5
Majority		2,987	85.5	N/A
Turnout		3,492	63.0	−18.7
United hold		Swing	N/A	
