= Wynand Malan =

South African politician (born 1943)

Wynand Charl Malan (born 25 May 1943) is a South African liberal Afrikaner politician and lawyer.

== Life and career ==
A lawyer, Malan entered politics in the 1977 South African election when he was elected to the South Africa's all white parliament as the National Party MP for Randburg.

A member of the NP's reform wing, he was critical of P.W. Botha for being too timid in his constitutional reforms in the 1980s and was also critical of the state of emergency implemented by Botha. In the 1987 general election, he left the NP and ran as one of three independent candidates along with former ambassador to London Denis Worrall and businesswoman Esther Lategan. Although Malan was the only one elected, the three independents performed well.

On 8 October 1987 Malan launched the National Democratic Movement (NDM) along with fellow dissident Afrikaners, Esther Lategan and Dawid de Villiers. They were joined by three defectors from the Progressive Federal Party (PFP): Peter Gastrow, Pierre Cronje, and Pieter Schoeman. Its aim would be to bridge the divide between parliamentary and extra-parliamentary politics.

The formation of the NDM led to a split with Worrall. The press had dubbed the independents the "Independent Movement". In a legal settlement with Worrall, it was agreed that the latter could keep the name "Independent Movement". Worrall went on to register a new party called the Independent Party (IP).

Neither the National Democratic Movement nor the Progressive Federal Party or the Independent Party was able to achieve dominance in the White electorate. As a result, there was considerable public pressure for the three to merge. On 5 February 1989, they agreed to a merger. The new party would be known as the Democratic Party. It was launched on 8 April with three co-leaders: Wynand Malan (NDM), Zach de Beer (PFP), and Denis Worrall (IP). Though the party did well in the elections in September 1989 winning 33 seats in the White parliament that was still fewer than anti-apartheid parties, (the PFP and the New Republic Party), had won in 1981.

Malan resigned from parliament and as co-leader of the Democratic Party on 11 July 1990, saying that what he had worked for had been achieved and that South Africa was on its way to becoming a non-racial democracy.

From 1995 to 1998, Malan was a Commissioner of the Truth and Reconciliation Commission, which was chaired by Archbishop Desmond Tutu.

Malan later joined the African National Congress in 2001 and served as an advisor to former president Thabo Mbeki.
