= Parow (House of Assembly of South Africa constituency) =

- Former constituency for the South African House of Assembly
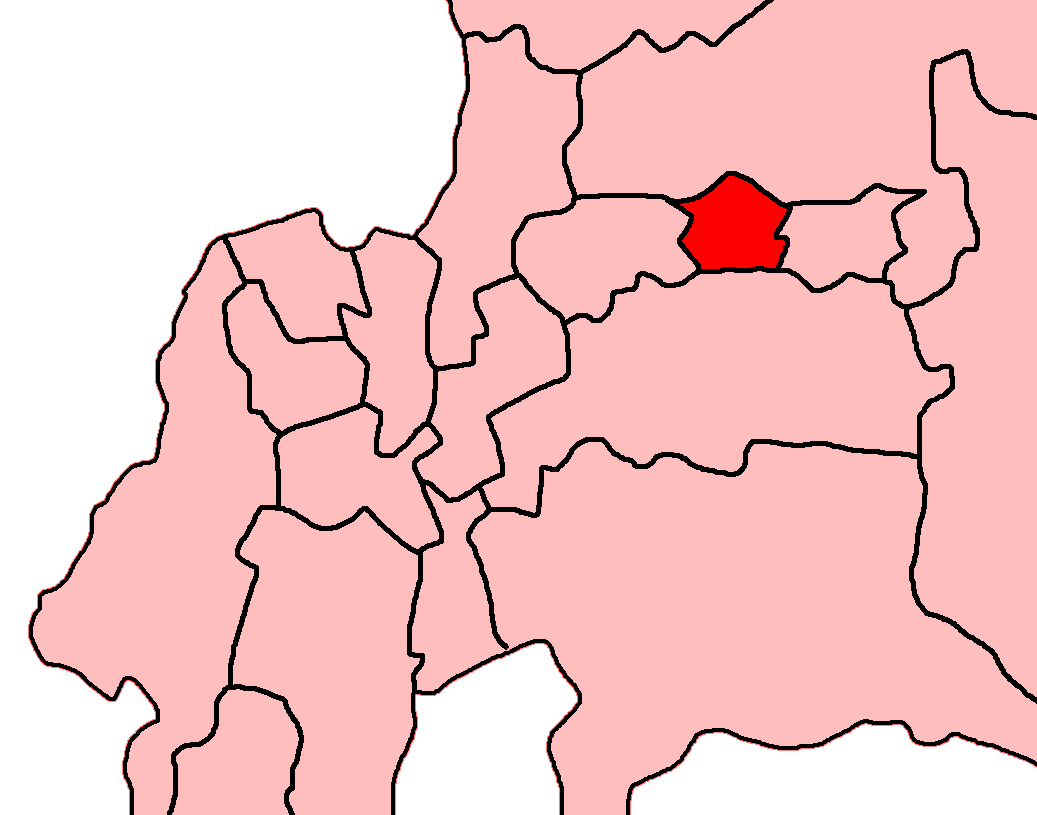
- Location of Parow within Cape Town (1981)
- Province: Cape of Good Hope
- Electorate: 16,170 (1989)

Former constituency
- Created: 1948
- Abolished: 1994
- Number of members: 1
- Last MHA: Hernus Kriel (NP)
- Created from: Cape Flats
- Replaced by: Western Cape

Parow was a constituency in the Cape Province of South Africa, which existed from 1948 to 1953 and again from 1958 to 1994. It was centred on the suburb of Parow, and covered a relatively compact area of Cape Town's eastern suburbs. Throughout its existence it elected one member to the House of Assembly and one to the Cape Provincial Council.

== Franchise notes ==
When the Union of South Africa was formed in 1910, the electoral qualifications in use in each pre-existing colony were kept in place. The Cape Colony had implemented a "colour-blind" franchise known as the Cape Qualified Franchise, which included all adult literate men owning more than £75 worth of property (controversially raised from £25 in 1892), and this initially remained in effect after the colony became the Cape Province. As of 1908, 22,784 out of 152,221 electors in the Cape Colony were "Native or Coloured". Eligibility to serve in Parliament and the Provincial Council, however, was restricted to whites from 1910 onward.

The first challenge to the Cape Qualified Franchise came with the Women's Enfranchisement Act, 1930 and the Franchise Laws Amendment Act, 1931, which extended the vote to women and removed property qualifications for the white population only – non-white voters remained subject to the earlier restrictions. In 1936, the Representation of Natives Act removed all black voters from the common electoral roll and introduced three "Native Representative Members", white MPs elected by the black voters of the province and meant to represent their interests in particular. A similar provision was made for Coloured voters with the Separate Representation of Voters Act, 1951, and although this law was challenged by the courts, it went into effect in time for the 1958 general election, which was thus held with all-white voter rolls for the first time in South African history. The all-white franchise would continue until the end of apartheid and the introduction of universal suffrage in 1994.

== History ==
Parow was one of a number of seats created out of the former Cape Flats constituency, and like most of them, it had a largely working-class, Afrikaans-speaking electorate that tended to support the governing National Party. In fact, Parow was the longest-lasting seat in Cape Town never to have voted for an opposition candidate, being represented by the NP continuously from its creation until the end of apartheid. Its longest-serving MP, Stephanus François (Pen) Kotzé, was first elected on the recreation of the seat in 1958 and served until his elevation to the President's Council in 1984, at which point he was replaced by future Western Cape Premier Hernus Kriel.

== Members ==
Election	Member	Party
1948	A. E. Erlank	National
1953	constituency abolished	

Election	Member	Party
1958	S. F. Kotzé	National
1961	S. F. Kotzé	National
1966	S. F. Kotzé	National
1970	S. F. Kotzé	National
1974	S. F. Kotzé	National
1977	S. F. Kotzé	National
1981	S. F. Kotzé	National
1984 by	Hernus Kriel	National
1987	Hernus Kriel	National
1989	Hernus Kriel	National
1994	constituency abolished	
