= Robin Carlisle =

South African politician

Robin Vincent Carlisle is a South African politician who represented the Democratic Alliance in the Western Cape Provincial Parliament between 2001 and 2014. He was the Provincial Minister of Transport and Public Works in the Western Cape Executive Council. He retired from political life in 2014.

Carlisle became politically active in 1960 when he joined the Progressive Party, and he was later a leader of the Progressive Federal Party. As a member of the Democratic Party, he represented the Wynberg constituency in the apartheid-era House of Assembly between 1989 and 1994. He also co-founded ACTSTOP, an organization that opposed forced removals during apartheid.
