= Radclyffe Cadman =

South African politician

Radclyffe Macbeth Cadman (14 January 1924 – 11 October 2011) was a South African politician who represented the United Party as Member of the House of Assembly for the electoral divisions of Zululand (1961–66, 1970–74) and Umhlatuzana (1974–77), and who led its successor, the New Republic Party, in the 1977 election. The election saw the party lose 13 of 23 seats it held at the dissolution (and 31 of 41 seats won in the 1974 election), including his own between the predominant National Party and the growing Progressive Federal Party, which overtook its strength outside Natal and, with a total of 17 seats, the role as official opposition.

During World War II he served as a sub-lieutenant in the Royal Navy. After the war he completed a BA at the University of Cape Town. He was awarded a scholarship to read law at Trinity Hall, Cambridge, qualifying as BA and LL.B in 1950 and MA (Cantab) in 1955.

President P. W. Botha awarded Cadman the Order for Meritorious Service in 1987.

Cadman was married to Natalie Randles- a descendant of James Rorke, who established the trading post Rorke's Drift- in 1957 and they had 3 children. In 1984 he became the government's administrator in Natal Province. He died on 11 October 2011 aged 87.

Political offices
Preceded by Stoffel Botha	Administrator of Natal Province; 1984–1990	Succeeded by Cornelius Botha
