= Theo Gerdener =

South African politician and author

Theo Gerdner
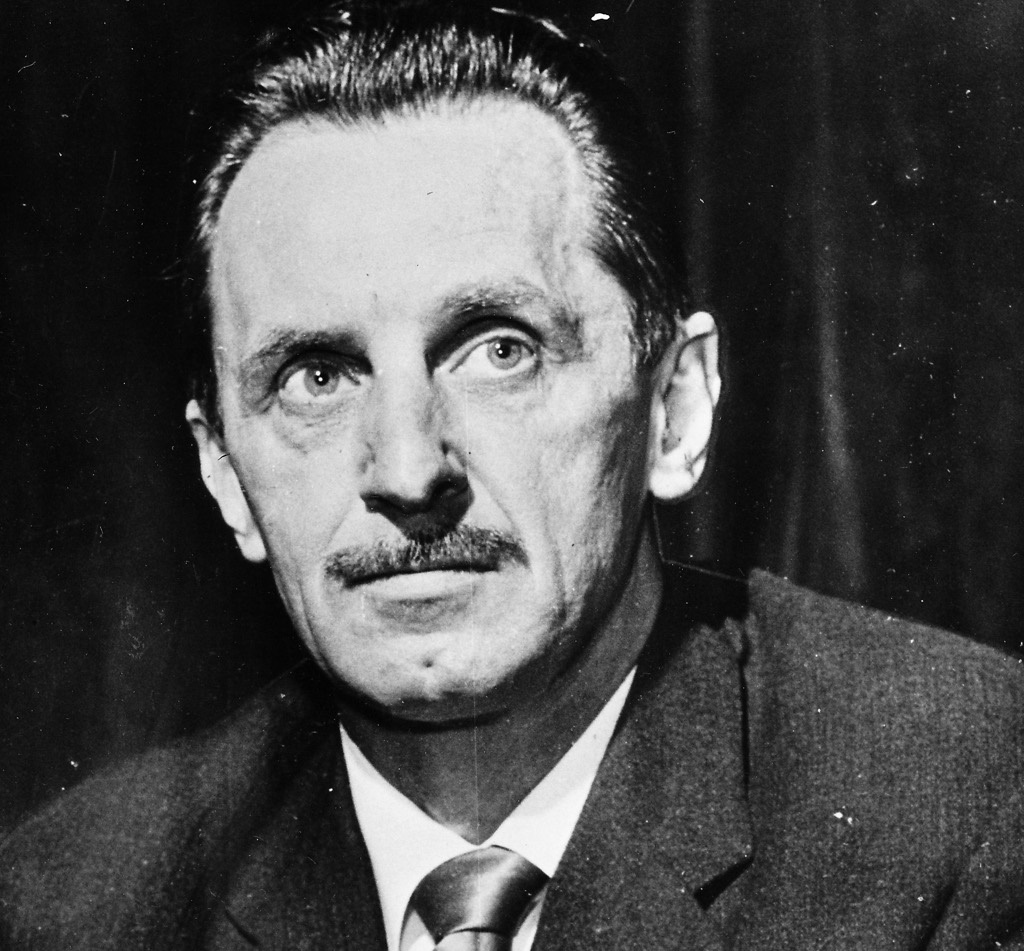

Minister of the Internal Affairs
- In office 1970 – 1972
- Prime Minister: John Vorster
- Preceded by: Marais Viljoen
- Succeeded by: Connie Mulder

Leader of National Party in Natal
- In office 1970 – 1972

Personal details
- Born: March 19, 1916 Cape Town, Cape Province, Union of South Africa
- Died: November 21, 2013 (aged 97) Pretoria, Gauteng, South Africa
- Party: National Party (before 1973)
- Other political affiliations: Democratic Party (1973–1977); New Republic Party (1977)
- Children: 3

Theodor Johannes Adolph Gerdener (19 March 1916 – 21 November 2013) was a South African politician, journalist, and author.

Born in Cape Town, Gerdener served as an interior minister for the National Party, but resigned from the National Party in 1972 as a result of the racial policies of the Vorster government. He founded the Democratic Party in 1973 and chaired it until 1977 when the Democratic Party and the United Party led by Sir De Villiers Graaff merged to form the New Republic Party.

He was Administrator of the Natal Province between November 1961 and August 1970. Before entering politics, Gerdener founded Die Nataller, the first Afrikaans newspaper in Natal.

Gerdener died on 21 November 2013, aged 97, in Pretoria.
