= 1987 South African general election =

- 6 May 1987

166 of the 178 seats in the House of Assembly 84 seats needed for a majority
- Registered: 3,031,414
- Turnout: 67.84% (▲7.94pp)
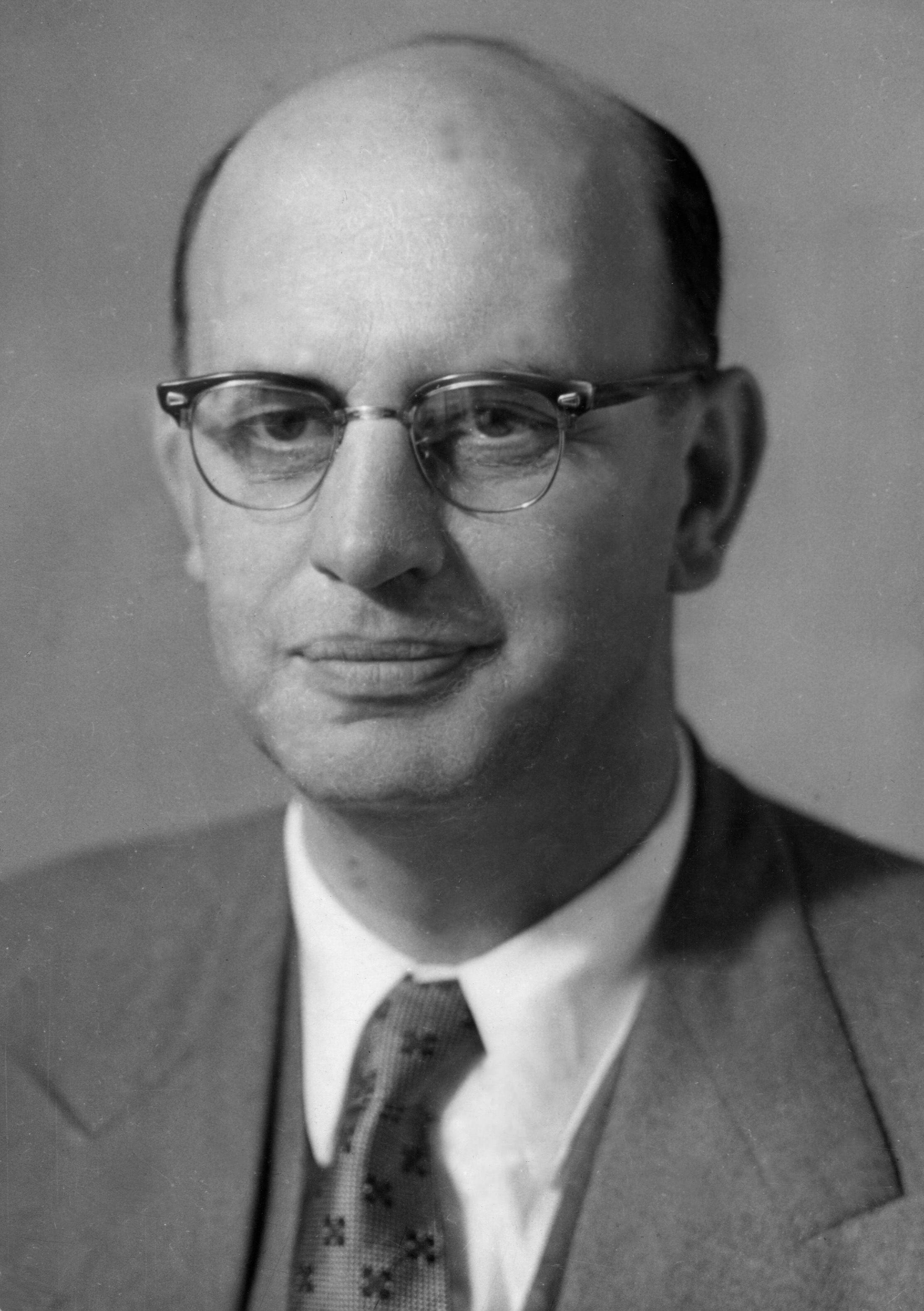

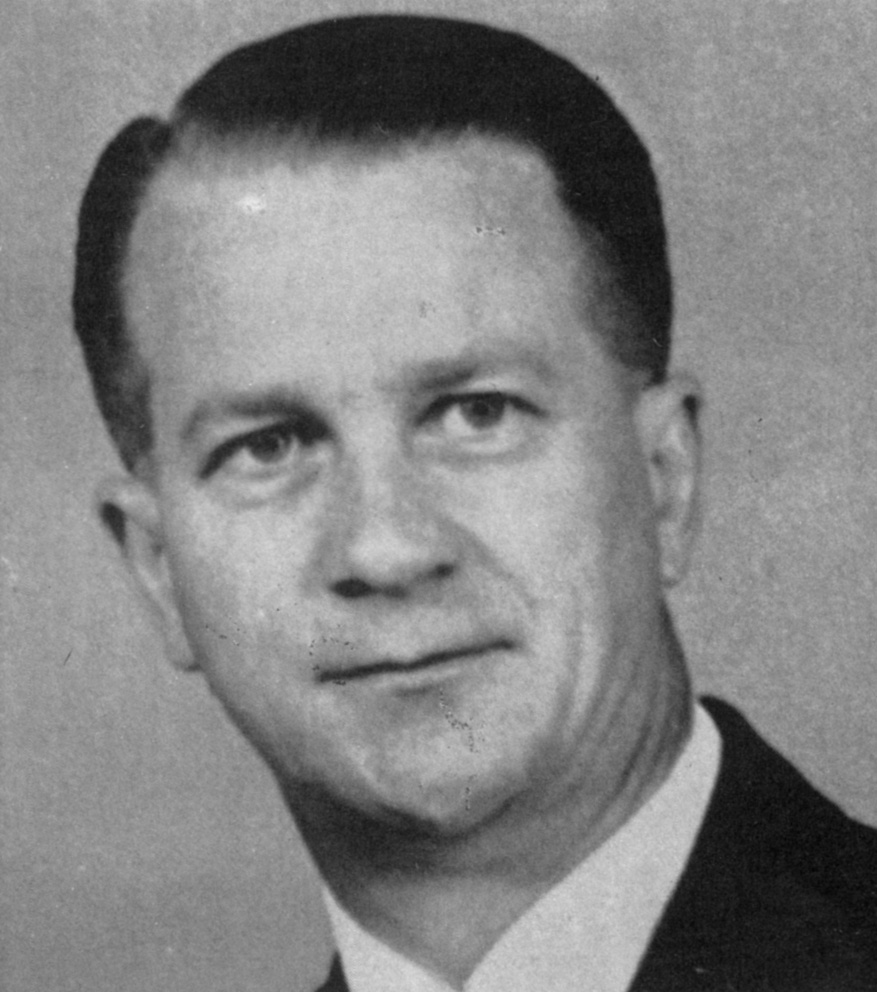

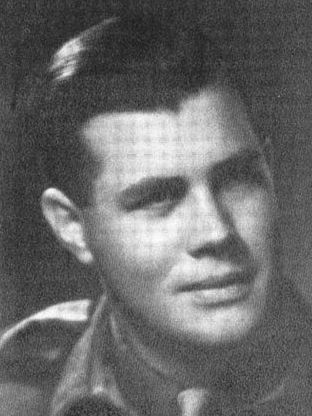
	First party	Second party	Third party
Leader	P. W. Botha	Andries Treurnicht	Colin Eglin
Party	National	Conservative	Progressive
Last election	57.66%, 131 seats	Did not exist	19.65%, 26 seats
Seats won	123	22	19
Seat change	▼8	New party	▼7
Popular vote	1,075,505	547,559	288,574
Percentage	52.70%	26.83%	14.14%
Swing	▼4.96pp	New party	▼5.51pp
State President before election
P. W. Botha
National
Elected State President
P. W. Botha
National

General elections were held in South Africa on 6 May 1987. The State of Emergency cast a cloud over the elections, which were again won by the National Party (NP) under the leadership of P. W. Botha, although for the first time it faced serious opposition from the right of the South African political spectrum. The election resulted in the creation of the Second Botha Cabinet, which held power until 1989.

The right-wing opposition came in the form of the Conservative Party (CP), which opposed even the limited powersharing with Indian and Coloured South Africans that had been implemented by the NP as part of a package of constitutional reforms in 1984. The CP was led by former chairman of the Broederbond and NP cabinet minister, Andries Treurnicht, who had been the Minister of Education during the Soweto riots. Following the election, in which the CP extended its 17 splinter MPs to win 22 seats, it replaced the Progressive Federal Party (PFP) as the official opposition in the House of Assembly.

The election year also saw important political developments to the left of the NP. During 1987 Denis Worrall resigned as the South African ambassador in London to return to politics. Together with Wynand Malan (who had resigned from the NP) and Esther Lategan he formed the Independent Movement to fight the general election. Only Malan won a seat and the partnership consequently disintegrated. Denis Worrall and others subsequently went on to form the Independent Party (IP), while Esther Lategan and others formed the National Democratic Movement.

Partially as a result of the split in the votes to the liberal anti-NP parties, the PFP lost seven of its parliamentary seats as well as its role of official opposition. The New Republic Party (NRP), formerly the United Party, continued its disintegration and lost seven of its eight seats.

== Results ==
Of the 12 appointed and indirectly elected seats, ten were taken by the National Party and one each by the Conservative Party and Progressive Federal Party.

Party	Votes	%	Seats	+/–
National Party	1,075,505	52.70	123	–8
Conservative Party	547,559	26.83	22	New
Progressive Federal Party	288,574	14.14	19	–7
Herstigte Nasionale Party	61,456	3.01	0	0
New Republic Party	40,494	1.98	1	–7
Independents	27,149	1.33	1	+1
Presidential appointees			4	0
Indirectly-elected members			8	0
Total	2,040,737	100.00	178	+1
Valid votes	2,040,737	99.23		
Invalid/blank votes	15,890	0.77		
Total votes	2,056,627	100.00		
Registered voters/turnout	3,031,414	67.84		

=== Cape Province ===
Constituency	1981 result	1987 winning party				Turnout	Votes						
Constituency	1981 result	Party	Votes	Share	Majority	Turnout	NP	PFP	CP	HNP	NRP	Independents	Total
Albany	PFP	NP	5,642	50.8%	844	69.9%	5,642	4,798		589			11,105
Algoa	NP	NP	7,382	62.6%	4,682	65.8%	7,382	1,449	2,700	229			11,793
Aliwal	NP	NP	4,379	58.6%	2,467	69.9%	4,379	678	1,912	308			7,299
Beaufort West	NP	NP	4,568	64.1%	2,486	75.5%	4,568		2,082	418			7,128
Bellville	NP	NP	7,087	75.0%	5,636	63.4%	7,087	870	1,452				9,455
Caledon	NP	NP	7,100	80.0%	4,636	71.4%	7,100				2,464		9,731
Cape Town Gardens	PFP	PFP	4,511	46.8%	486	58.8%	4,511	4,997					9,643
Ceres	NP	NP	5,333	67.4%	2,860	75.4%	5,333		2,473				7,909
Claremont	PFP	PFP		100%				Unopposed					
Constantia	PFP	PFP	8,008	63.2%	3,452	65.1%	4,556	8,008					12,661
Cradock	NP	NP	4,532	55.8%	2,396	76.0%	4,532	1,184	2,136	251			8,124
De Aar	NP	NP	4,584	57.6%	1,283	78.3%	4,584		3,301				7,964
De Kuilen	NP	NP	10,244	73.4%	8,218	69.4%	10,244	1,326	2,026	284			13,963
Durbanville	NP	NP	10,983	61.1%	6,084	77.0%	10,983	4,899	1,636	280			17,986
East London City	NP	NP	7,035	67.7%	3,782	60.3%	7,035	3,253					10,388
East London North	NP	NP	7,569	64.3%	3,873	66.5%	7,569	3,696				467	11,773
False Bay	NP	NP	8,644	77.9%	7,404	65.7%	8,644	1,240		1,161			11,093
George	NP	NP	8,312	64.4%	6,278	69.7%	8,312	2,034	1,918	571			12,901
Gordonia	NP	NP	4,606	60.2%	2,181	72.2%	4,606		2,425	593			7,649
Graaff-Reinet	NP	NP	4,268	54.5%	1,928	78.7%	4,268		2,340	181		1,035	7,835
Green Point	PFP	PFP	3,608	49.9%	39	52.9%	3,569	3,608					7,232
Groote Schuur	PFP	PFP		100%				Unopposed					
Helderberg	NP	NP	8,439	46.7%	39	82.2%	8,439		1,189			8,400	18,076
Humansdorp	NP	NP	6,740	55.2%	3,798	73.0%	6,740	2,169	2,942	329			12,207
Kimberley North	NP	NP	5,539	56.1%	2,650	69.2%	5,539	989	2,889	433			9,881
Kimberley South	NP	NP	6,757	62.3%	4,052	70.9%	6,757	825	2,705	522			10,845
King William's Town	NRP	NP	7,127	61.5%	2,731	64.7%	7,172				4,441		11,671
Kuruman	NP	NP	4,154	52.0%	352	77.7%	4,154		3,802				7,986
Maitland	NP	NP	7,508	64.0%	4,280	60.7%	7,508	3,228	774	144			11,737
Malmesbury	NP	NP	8,901	71.1%	7,415	66.5%	8,901	1,486	1,435	638			12,514
Mossel Bay	NP	NP	7,108	65.4%	3,435	76.5%	7,108		3,673				10,873
Namaqualand	NP	NP	4,489	62.6%	1,849	71.5%	4,489		2,640				7,176
Newton Park	NP	NP	7,840	58.6%	3,386	75.6%	7,840	4,454		983			13,375
Oudtshoorn	NP	NP	5,358	56.5%	1,296	73.5%	5,358		4,062				9,476
Paarl	NP	NP	7,753	71.0%	5,606	67.6%	7,753	989	2,147				10,919
Parow	NP	NP	8,122	76.0%	6,448	65.3%	8,122	571	1,674	274			10,689
Piketberg	NP	NP	8,210	73.3%	5,314	76.3%	8,210		2,896				11,200
Pinelands	PFP	PFP	6,958	59.5%	2,422	72.9%	4,536	6,958					11,690
Port Elizabeth Central	PFP	PFP	4,714	52.6%	596	61.4%	4,118	4,714					8,961
Port Elizabeth North	NP	NP	6,507	71.3%	4,503	55.2%	6,507		2,004	443			9,128
Prieska	NP	NP	3,949	61.0%	2,069	72.4%	3,949		1,880	565			6,476
Queenstown	NP	NP	4,639	51.1%	2,162	73.0%	4,639		1,570		2,477		9,078
Sea Point	PFP	PFP	8,010	71.5%	4,934	65.7%	3,076	8,010					11,207
Simonstown	NP	NP	7,288	50.6%	268	70.2%	7,288	7,020					14,412
Stellenbosch	NP	NP	5,296	56.5%	1,781	69.7%	5,296			494		3,515	9,376
Sundays River	NP	NP	6,088	61.1%	2,868	75.6%	6,088	305	3,220	311			9,957
Swellendam	NP	NP	5,812	60.9%	3,188	78.0%	5,812		2,624		1,042		9,541
Tygervallei	NP	NP	8,350	81.4%	7,178	57.1%	8,350			667	1,172		10,264
Uitenhage	NP	NP	5,953	57.1%	1,878	66.4%	5,953		4,075	197			10,428
Vasco	NP	NP	7,160	73.2%	5,243	60.6%	7,160		1,917		676		9,780
Vryburg	NP	NP	4,500	56.4%	1,374	78.8%	4,500		3,126	308			7,980
Walmer	PFP	NP	6,151	51.7%	539	69.2%	6,151	5,612					11,895
Walvis Bay		NP	1,782	72.6%	1,140	52.7%	1,782		642				2,454
Wellington	NP	NP	8,877	72.6%	6,798	64.1%	8,877	833	2,079	355			12,230
Worcester	NP	NP	7,553	75.9%	5,308	67.5%	7,553			2,245			9,953
Wynberg	PFP	NP	5,264	50.0%	97	62.3%	5,264	5,167					10,537
Total for all constituencies						Turnout							
Total for all constituencies						Turnout	NP	PFP	CP	HNP	NRP	Independents	Total
Total for all constituencies						Turnout	Votes						Total
Total for all constituencies						64.5%	333,499	90,966	80,366	13,772	12,272	13,417	544,292
Total for all constituencies						64.5%	61.3%	16.7%	14.8%	2.5%	2.3%	2.5%	100.0%
Total for all constituencies						64.5%	Seats						
Total for all constituencies						64.5%	48	8	0	0	0	0	56
Total for all constituencies						64.5%	85.7%	14.3%	0%	0%	0%	0%	100.0%

=== Natal ===
Constituency	1981 result	1987 winning party				Turnout	Votes						
Constituency	1981 result	Party	Votes	Share	Majority	Turnout	NP	PFP	CP	NRP	HNP	Independents	Total
Amanzimtoti	NRP	NP	6,392	51.0%	1,884	66.6%	6,392		1,597	4,508			12,538
Berea	PFP	PFP	7,071	64.4%	3,160	66.1%	3,911	7,071					10,982
Durban Central	PFP	PFP	5,592	56.6%	1,360	58.7%	4,232	5,592					9,888
Durban North	NRP	PFP	7,718	57.0%	2,110	71.6%	5,608	7,718					13,548
Durban Point	NRP	NP	5,017	56.7%	1,230	51.4%	5,017			3,787			8,849
Greytown	PFP	PFP	7,106	48.1%	676	70.4%	6,430	7,106	1,175				14,773
Klip River	NP	NP	5,956	54.0%	3,480	71.9%	5,956	1,930	2,467		634		11,045
Mooi River	NRP	NRP	6,103	51.7%	1,807	71.7%	4,296		1,357	6,103			11,800
Newcastle	NP	NP	5,713	47.0%	1,064	66.0%	5,713	822	4,649		904		12,152
Pietermaritzburg North	PFP	NP	6,652	52.5%	1,121	68.3%	6,652	5,531			414		12,666
Pietermaritzburg South	PFP	NP	7,436	54.0%	1,509	69.2%	7,436	5,927			352		13,778
Pinetown	PFP	PFP	8,293	58.0%	2,394	69.8%	5,899	8,293					14,297
Port Natal	NP	NP	7,092	57.1%	3,703	64.5%	7,092	3,389	1,875				12,415
South Coast	NRP	NP	5,778	49.6%	1,419	72.2%	5,772		1,469	4,359			11,640
Umbilo	NRP	NP	5,050	52.0%	480	57.4%	5,050			4,570			9,716
Umfolozi	NP	NP	4,381	45.7%	1,743	62.5%	4,381		2,638			2,531	9,584
Umhlanga	NRP	NP	6,195	51.9%	557	67.4%	6,195	5,638					11,933
Umhlatuzana	NP	NP	8,234	64.8%	3,519	66.1%	8,234	4,715			718		13,712
Umlazi	NP	NP	8,035	65.0%	4,882	63.0%	8,035	3,153	966		167		12,363
Vryheid	NP	NP	6,992	61.9%	4,135	69.8%	6,992		2,857		1,257		11,300
Total for all constituencies						Turnout							
Total for all constituencies						Turnout	NP	PFP	CP	NRP	HNP	Independents	Total
Total for all constituencies						Turnout	Votes						Total
Total for all constituencies						66.2%	119,293	66,885	21,050	23,327	4,446	2,531	237,532
Total for all constituencies						66.2%	50.2%	28.2%	8.9%	9.8%	1.9%	1.1%	100.0%
Total for all constituencies						66.2%	Seats						
Total for all constituencies						66.2%	14	5	0	1	0	0	20
Total for all constituencies						66.2%	70%	25%	0%	5%	0%	0%	100.0%

=== Orange Free State ===
Constituency	1981 result	1987 winning party				Turnout	Votes				
Constituency	1981 result	Party	Votes	Share	Majority	Turnout	NP	CP	HNP	PFP	Total
Bethlehem	NP	NP	6,923	56.1%	2,038	77.8%	6,923	4,885	433		12,337
Bloemfontein East	NP	NP	8,518	60.8%	3,118	65.8%	8,518	5,400			14,008
Bloemfontein North	NP	NP	7,152	62.0%	4,353	69.9%	7,152	2,799		1,532	11,535
Bloemfontein West	NP	NP	7,371	65.8%	3,658	75.5%	7,371	3,713			11,198
Fauresmith	NP	NP	4,226	51.3%	1,048	63.4%	4,226	3,178	792		8,237
Heilbron	NP	NP	5,713	50.4%	680	71.4%	5,713	5,033	567		11,346
Kroonstad	NP	NP	6,960	61.7%	2,724	72.2%	6,960	4,236			11,283
Ladybrand	NP	NP	5,870	53.3%	842	80.4%	5,870	5,028			11,012
Parys	NP	NP	6,412	47.9%	183	76.7%	6,412	6,229	696		13,397
Sasolburg	NP	NP	7,334	48.9%	2,673	72.9%	7,334	2,933	4,661		14,995
Smithfield	NP	NP	5,162	55.0%	1,684	70.4%	5,162	2,136	710		9,388
Virginia	NP	NP	6,708	55.0%	3,047	62.7%	6,708	3,661	1,237	551	12,191
Welkom	NP	NP	7,891	52.7%	2,309	64.7%	7,891	5,582	938	529	14,968
Winburg	NP	NP	7,257	57.9%	2,524	74.6%	7,257	4,733	471		12,540
Total for all constituencies						Turnout					Total
Total for all constituencies						Turnout	NP	CP	HNP	PFP	Total
Total for all constituencies						Turnout	Votes				
Total for all constituencies						71.1%	93,497	59,546	10,505	2,612	166,160
Total for all constituencies						71.1%	56.3%	35.8%	6.3%	1.6%	100.0%
Total for all constituencies						71.1%	Seats				
Total for all constituencies						71.1%	14	0	0	0	14
Total for all constituencies						71.1%	100.0%	0%	0%	0%	100.0%

=== Transvaal ===
Constituency	Region	1981 result	1987 winning party				Turnout	Votes						
Constituency	Region	1981 result	Party	Votes	Share	Majority	Turnout	NP	CP	PFP	HNP	NRP	Independents	Total
Alberton	PWV	NP	NP	7,695	55.0%	1,946	66.0%	7,695	5,749		387			14,001
Barberton	East	NP	CP	6,050	46.7%	284	72.4%	5,766	6,050		1,090			12,965
Benoni	PWV	NP	NP	6,498	49.3%	2,798	65.2%	6,498	2,915	3,700				13,173
Bethal	East	NP	CP	10,331	52.7%	1,612	69.1%	8,719	10,331		474			19,606
Bezuidenhout	PWV	PFP	NP	7,354	58.9%	2,442	58.8%	7,534		4,912				12,492
Boksburg	PWV	NP	NP	7,198	50.5%	2,790	66.1%	7,198	4,408	2,055	556			14,264
Brakpan	PWV	NP	CP	6,827	49.6%	288	66.7%	6,539	6,827		251			13,755
Brentwood	PWV	NP	NP	7,955	50.4%	2,011	68.1%	7,955	5,944			1,836		15,780
Brits	West	NP	CP	7,311	54.4%	1,667	75.8%	5,644	7,311		430			13,438
Bryanston	PWV	PFP	PFP	7,398	51.1%	2,533	68.7%	4,865		7,398			2,128	14,469
Carletonville	PWV	NP	CP	5,970	47.7%	98	64.4%	5,872	5,970		571			12,514
Delmas	East	NP	CP	7,216	44.7%	275	72.8%	6,941	7,216	1,058	793			16,140
Edenvale	PWV	PFP	NP	6,902	50.0%	168	65.1%	6,902		6,734				13,808
Ermelo	East	NP	CP	6,641	49.4%	671	74.3%	5,970	6,641		766			13,446
Florida	PWV	NP	NP	7,509	53.1%	4,251	78.9%	7,509	3,158	2,591			833	14,148
Geduld	PWV	NP	NP	8,045	54.8%	1,723	65.7%	8,045	6,322					14,686
Germiston	PWV	NP	NP	6,507	53.2%	2,440	59.8%	6,407	3,967	1,404	386			12,238
Germiston District	PWV	NP	NP	7,604	56.7%	2,394	58.9%	7,604	5,210		350			13,420
Gezina	PWV	NP	NP	6,584	52.3%	1,328	64.9%	6,584	5,256		566			12,582
Helderkruin	PWV	NP	NP	9,815	49.9%	4,617	71.2%	9,815	5,198	4,572				19,676
Hercules	PWV	NP	NP	6,114	39.2%	861	70.0%	6,114	5,253		4,123			15,587
Hillbrow	PWV	PFP	PFP	3,455	42.8%	89	43.3%	3,455	1,196	3,366				8,074
Houghton	PWV	PFP	PFP	8,635	63.1%	3,851	67.4%	4,784		8,635				13,689
Innesdal	PWV	NP	NP	7,274	49.9%	1,024	75.5%	7,274	6,250		871			14,564
Jeppes	PWV	NP	NP	6,206	67.3%	4,231	42.2%	6,206	1,975			1,010		9,216
Johannesburg North	PWV	PFP	PFP	8,609	66.4%	4,488	68.2%	4,121		8,609				12,960
Johannesburg West	PWV	NP	NP	5,951	57.3%	3,566	51.6%	5,951		2,385	1,911			10,383
Kempton Park	PWV	NP	NP	7,809	56.4%	2,379	65.8%	7,809	5,430		362			13,851
Klerksdorp	West	NP	NP	6,980	43.6%	1,852	69.1%	8,832	6,980					16,020
Koedoespoort	PWV	NP	NP	8,284	55.0%	3,167	72.1%	8,284	5,117		1,250			15,060
Krugersdorp	PWV	NP	NP	7,238	49.7%	55	65.4%	7,238	7,183					14,577
Langlaagte	PWV	NP	NP	6,524	56.4%	2,633	58.5%	6,524	3,891	849	267			11,574
Lichtenburg	West	NP	CP	7,595	57.5%	2,590	79.5%	5,005	7,595		565			13,206
Losberg	PWV	NP	CP	8,404	54.7%	1,886	67.8%	6,518	8,404					15,374
Lydenburg	East	NP	NP	5,711	47.2%	143	73.8%	5,854	5,711		439			12,110
Maraisburg	PWV	NP	NP	5,302	49.7%	837	52.6%	5,302	4,465	617	282			10,666
Meyerton	PWV	NP	NP	7,975	46.9%	360	66.6%	7,975	7,615	1,333				16,998
Middelburg	East	NP	CP	8,123	48.6%	529	73.3%	8,123	7,531		1,010			16,719
Modderfontein	PWV	NP	NP	10,258	57.0%	5,318	67.8%	10,258	4,940	2,371	358			17,996
Nelspruit	East	NP	NP	7,335	51.3%	2,126	70.9%	7,335	5,209	1,006	713			14,303
Nigel	PWV	NP	CP	7,474	49.9%	641	69.8%	6,833	7,474		565			14,969
North Rand	PWV	NP	NP	9,940	40.7%	1,197	70.2%	9,940	5,543	8,743				24,428
Overvaal	PWV	NP	CP	8,155	53.2%	1,074	65.4%	7,081	8,155					15,325
Parktown	PWV	PFP	PFP	7,839	65.9%	3,953	65.3%	3,886		7,839				11,887
Pietersburg	North	NP	CP	8,346	53.3%	1,151	76.1%	7,195	8,346					15,648
Potchefstroom	West	NP	NP	6,882	51.8%	558	70.9%	6,882	6,324					13,278
Potgietersrus	North	NP	CP	7,761	50.2%	1,238	81.5%	6,523	7,761		1,136			15,470
Pretoria Central	PWV	NP	NP	5,394	57.0%	2,470	54.0%	5,394	2,924	502	568			9,469
Pretoria East	PWV	NP	NP	14,389	56.0%	8,242	80.1%	14,389	6,147	4,573	444			25,672
Pretoria West	PWV	NP	NP	6,998	49.1%	1,326	58.6%	6,998	5,672		1,509			14,262
Primrose	PWV	NP	NP	7,612	57.3%	2,392	66.2%	7,612	5,220		275			13,293
Randburg	PWV	NP	Ind	8,240	55.8%	2,646	69.7%	5,593	884				8,240	14,767
Randfontein	PWV	NP	CP	7,999	54.8%	1,732	65.7%	6,267	7,999		267			14,591
Rissik	PWV	NP	NP	7,040	56.7%	3,846	64.6%	7,040	3,194			2,049		12,411
Roodeplaat	PWV	NP	NP	8,289	49.6%	1,645	76.0%	8,289	6,644		1,589			16,712
Roodepoort	PWV	NP	CP	6,870	49.4%	714	65.1%	6,156	6,870	739	119			13,914
Rosettenville	PWV	NP	NP	7,269	65.6%	5,042	55.2%	7,269	2,227	1,460				11,087
Rustenburg	West	NP	NP	6,736	45.2%	816	65.9%	6,736	5,920	502	1,734			14,918
Sandton	PWV	PFP	PFP	10,980	68.5%	6,106	65.5%	4,874		10,980				16,030
Schweizer-Reneke	West	NP	CP	5,622	48.3%	191	78.8%	5,431	5,622		544			11,636
Soutpansberg	North	NP	CP	7,170	49.6%	250	82.0%	6,920	7,170		267			14,444
Springs	PWV	NP	NP	6,523	48.1%	884	67.2%	6,523	5,639	1,325				13,558
Standerton	East	NP	CP	7,096	50.2%	952	70.9%	6,144	7,096		834			14,138
Stilfontein	West	NP	NP	5,504	44.6%	209	65.5%	5,504	5,295		1,289			12,331
Sunnyside	PWV	NP	NP	6,298	53.4%	3,233	65.9%	6,298	3,065	2,365				11,795
Turffontein	PWV	NP	NP	9,010	61.5%	5,859	60.9%	9,010	3,151	2,333				14,641
Vanderbijlpark	PWV	NP	NP	9,092	57.0%	2,346	66.6%	9,092	6,746					15,956
Ventersdorp	West	NP	CP	6,704	54.1%	1,531	73.0%	6,704	5,173		448			12,390
Vereeniging	PWV	NP	NP	7,120	52.0%	1,524	66.1%	7,120	5,596	933				13,684
Verwoerdburg	PWV	NP	NP	10,940	58.5%	4,991	78.2%	10,940	5,949	1,748				18,698
Waterberg	North	NP	CP	7,122	51.8%	2,375	77.4%	4,717	7,122		1,845			13,749
Waterkloof	PWV	NP	NP	7,790	48.5%	2,650	80.9%	7,790	3,038	5,140				16,074
Westdene	PWV	NP	NP	7,531	55.9%	4,353	68.0%	7,531	2,666	3,178				13,483
Witbank	East	NP	CP	8,319	49.3%	842	68.6%	7,477	8,319		886			16,891
Wonderboom	PWV	NP	NP	9,496	49.1%	599	75.5%	9,496	8,897		841			19,342
Yeoville	PWV	PFP	PFP	7,707	62.2%	3,159	60.4%	4,548		7,707				12,394
Total for all constituencies							Turnout							
Total for all constituencies							Turnout	NP	CP	PFP	HNP	NRP	Independents	Total
Total for all constituencies							Turnout	Votes						Total
Total for all constituencies							66.8%	529,216	381,066	123,662	34,815	4,011	11,201	1,083,971
Total for all constituencies							66.8%	48.8%	35.2%	11.4%	3.2%	0.4%	1.0%	100.0%
Total for all constituencies							66.8%	Seats						
Total for all constituencies							66.8%	47	21	7	0	0	1	76
Total for all constituencies							66.8%	61.8%	27.6%	8.9%	0%	0%	1.3%	100.0%

== Reactions ==
Anglican Archbishop and Nobel Peace Prize winner Desmond Tutu noted after the election, "We have entered the dark ages of the history of our country".

Donald Simpson, writing in the South African newspaper, The Star, went as far as to predict that the National Party would lose the next election and that the Conservative Party would become the new government of South Africa.

== See also ==
- White backlash
