= National Democratic Movement (South Africa) =

History of a political organisation

The National Democratic Movement (NDM) in South Africa was an anti-apartheid political organisation founded by three dissident Afrikaners (Wynand Malan, Esther Lategan, and Dawid de Villiers) and three defectors from the Progressive Federal Party (Peter Gastrow, Pierre Cronje, and Pieter Schoeman) on 8 October 1987. Wynand Malan was its leader. It merged with the Progressive Federal Party (PFP) and the Independent Party on 8 April 1989 to form the Democratic Party.

== Background ==
Wynand Malan had defected from South Africa's ruling party, the National Party, in January 1987 to stand as an anti-apartheid independent in the 1987 South African general election. He was joined in February by fellow defectors Denis Worrall and Esther Lategan; and the press dubbed the three, the "Independent Movement." Although Malan was the only one elected to parliament, the three did well. By contrast, the Progressive Federal Party, the government's main parliamentary anti-apartheid opposition at the time, did poorly.

The three independents had left the National Party because of P.W. Botha's failure to get rid of apartheid quickly enough. But there were significant political differences between Malan and Worrall. In particular, Malan and Lategan are reported to have felt that Worrall was not committed enough to engaging with South Africa's Black extra-parliamentary opposition. These differences came to a head when the NDM was formed. Within days of the NDM's formation, Worrall had formed what would become the Independent Party.

== Political impact of the formation of the NDM ==
South Africa's mainstream White liberal press reacted with dismay to the split between Malan and Worrall. An editorial in a leading weekend newspaper, the Sunday Times was typical: "The kamikaze opposition". Its editor, Tertius Myburgh wrote: "South Africa's left-of-centre politicians are queueing up to press the self-destruct button in a week during which Mr Wynand Malan and three disaffected senior Progs went marching off, confusedly, into the political sunset". The Sunday Tribune, a leading newspaper in KwaZulu Natal called the formation of the NDM a "shabby act of expediency".

The response of the Black anti-apartheid opposition was more positive, if cautious. Co-president of the United Democratic Front (UDF), Archie Gumede, is quoted as saying "any movement which is directed at encouraging the electorate to accept the principles of democracy and apply them, is welcome news." When asked why he did not support the anti-apartheid PFP Gumede indicated that it was too closely associated with, to quote, "the Oppenheimers". At the time, the Oppenheimer family in South Africa were leading shareholders in South African mining companies: Anglo-American Corporation and De Beers Consolidated Mines. Community leader and patron of the UDF, Johnny Issel, also welcomed the formation of the NDM saying, to quote, "The NDM... has the potential to reach substantially larger numbers of whites than the UDF" and "The NDM seems more committed to seeking ties with extra-parliamentary groupings."

The NDM rejected the politics of polarisation between parliamentary and extra-parliamentary organisations. It also rejected the state-of-emergency that had been imposed on South Africa at the time, but argued that emergency powers under judicial control might be needed to manage conflict in South Africa.

== Discussions with the African National Congress ==
The NDM met with the African National Congress (ANC) in Frankfurt on 26 May 1988. In addition to its leader, Wynand Malan, the NDM delegation included executive members Esther Lategan, Pierre Cronje, Harald Pakendorf, and Jannie Hofmeyr. The ANC delegation consisted of Thabo Mbeki and Jacob Zuma (two future presidents of South Africa), Aziz Pahad and Tony Seedat.

According to the article, Malan described the purpose of the talks as being "to explain the movement's activities and its vision for the future." There had been a lot of publicity about a Van Zyl Slabbert idea for a new party to fight the upcoming local elections but the NDM favoured a politics of alliances.

During the talks, two bombs went off in the capital city of Pretoria, injuring four people. At a press conference after the meeting, Malan was asked about the ANC's strategy of armed struggle. He is quoted as saying "We voiced our opposition and difference to that strategy. We also got an explanation from them on the origin of the armed struggle. We can understand what they are saying but from our position we are still fundamentally in disagreement with it."

In a joint press statement the two parties noted that they were in broad agreement about a vision for the future of South Africa though they disagreed about strategy. They agreed to the protection of language, culture, and individual rights in a multi-party democracy.

== Merger to form the Democratic Party ==
By the end of 1988 the National Democratic Movement, Progressive Federal Party, and Independent Party were in merger talks to form a new party. Political polling had shown that they would do poorly if they fought future elections as separate parties.

After some months of negotiation and a day of talks on 5 February 1989 the three parties agreed to merge under the new name of the Democratic Party. The merger took place on 8 April 1989 with three co-leaders: Zach de Beer of the PFP, Denis Worrall of the IP, and Wynand Malan of the NDM. They would continue to lead the party into the 1989 general election in September. In the election the Democratic Party won 33 seats - one fewer than its predecessors, the PFP and the New Republic Party had won in 1981.
