= The Cape Messenger =

South African online newspaper

- The Cape Messenger screenshot on 3 August 2018
- Type: Daily newspaper
- Format: Online newspaper
- Editor: Donwald Pressly
- Founded: 2015
- Ceased publication: 2018
- Language: English
- Headquarters: Cape Town, South Africa
- Website: www.themessenger.global

The Cape Messenger, also known as The Messenger, was a South African daily online newspaper founded in 2015 by Denis Worrall and edited by Donwald Pressly and published by The Messenger Media Innovation Group. The publication focused on business and politics in South Africa with a particular focus on the Western Cape region of South Africa. It become defunct in August 2018.
