= Border (House of Assembly of South Africa constituency) =

- Grens
- Former constituency for the South African House of Assembly
- Province: Cape of Good Hope
- Electorate: 3,801 (1921)

Former constituency
- Created: 1910
- Abolished: 1924
- Number of members: 1
- Last MHA: J. J. Byron (SAP)
- Replaced by: East London North

Border (Afrikaans: Grens) was a constituency in the Cape Province of South Africa, which existed from 1910 to 1924. It covered the rural area surrounding the city of East London, and derived its name from its former status as the Cape Colony’s eastern border region. Throughout its existence it elected one member to the House of Assembly and one to the Cape Provincial Council.

== Franchise notes ==
When the Union of South Africa was formed in 1910, the electoral qualifications in use in each pre-existing colony were kept in place. The Cape Colony had implemented a “colour-blind” franchise known as the Cape Qualified Franchise, which included all adult literate men owning more than £75 worth of property (controversially raised from £25 in 1892), and this initially remained in effect after the colony became the Cape Province. As of 1908, 22,784 out of 152,221 electors in the Cape Colony were “Native or Coloured”. Eligibility to serve in Parliament and the Provincial Council, however, was restricted to whites from 1910 onward.

The first challenge to the Cape Qualified Franchise came with the Women's Enfranchisement Act, 1930 and the Franchise Laws Amendment Act, 1931, which extended the vote to women and removed property qualifications for the white population only – non-white voters remained subject to the earlier restrictions. In 1936, the Representation of Natives Act removed all black voters from the common electoral roll and introduced three “Native Representative Members”, white MPs elected by the black voters of the province and meant to represent their interests in particular. A similar provision was made for Coloured voters with the Separate Representation of Voters Act, 1951, and although this law was challenged by the courts, it went into effect in time for the 1958 general election, which was thus held with all-white voter rolls for the first time in South African history. The all-white franchise would continue until the end of apartheid and the introduction of universal suffrage in 1994.

== History ==
Like most of the Eastern Cape, Border’s electorate was largely English-speaking and loyal to the pro-British side of South African politics. Its first MP, Unionist George Blaine, was elected unopposed in 1910 and faced opposition only from an independent in 1915, but in 1920 both the Labour and National parties decided to contest the seat without success. The by-election to replace Blaine later that year was similarly lively, seeing contests by both the South African Party and the Nationals, but Unionist candidate John Joseph Byron was elected handily. When the Unionists and SAP merged the following year, Byron joined the new SAP and was easily re-elected over an independent. Border was abolished in 1924, replaced with the new seat of East London North, and Byron went on to represent the new seat until 1935.

== Members ==
Election	Member	Party
1910	George Blaine	Unionist
1915	George Blaine	Unionist
1920	George Blaine	Unionist
1920 by	J. J. Byron	Unionist
1921	J. J. Byron	South African
1924	constituency abolished	

== Detailed results ==
=== Elections in the 1910s ===
General election 1910: Border
Party	Candidate	Votes	%	±%
Unionist	George Blaine	Unopposed		
Unionist win (new seat)				

General election 1915: Border
Party	Candidate	Votes	%	±%
Unionist	George Blaine	1,150	61.1	N/A
Independent	T. A. Stephen	731	38.9	New
Majority		419	3.6	N/A
Turnout		1,881	60.7	N/A
Unionist hold		Swing	N/A	

=== Elections in the 1920s ===
General election 1920: Border
Party	Candidate	Votes	%	±%
Unionist	George Blaine	1,239	58.0	−3.1
Labour	W. Plyman	492	23.0	New
National	W. A. Fourie	407	19.0	New
Majority		747	35.0	N/A
Turnout		2,138	59.7	−1.0
Unionist hold		Swing	N/A	

Border by-election, 14 July 1920
Party	Candidate	Votes	%	±%
Unionist	J. J. Byron	1,142	61.2	+3.2
National	L. J. Steytler	447	24.0	+5.0
South African	W. L. Plymen	276	14.8	New
Majority		695	37.3	N/A
Turnout		1,865	52.1	−7.6
Unionist hold		Swing	N/A	

General election 1921: Border
Party	Candidate	Votes	%	±%
South African	J. J. Byron	1,373	78.8	New
Independent	H. B. Cuming	370	21.2	New
Majority		1,003	57.6	N/A
Turnout		1,743	45.9	−13.8
South African hold		Swing	N/A	
