= Federalism in South Africa =

Federalism in South Africa refers to the idea that the national government should be subordinate to the provinces.

In 1949 the historian Arthur Keppel-Jones wrote Friends or Foes? A point of view and a programme for racial harmony in South Africa, which claimed that devolution into federalist states would promote harmonious relations between the different population groups of South Africa. Several decades later, in 1974, the Mahlabatini Declaration of Faith, which stressed the federal concept, was signed. In 1977 the Progressive Federal Party was started, which advocated power-sharing through a federal constitution. Today, the political parties which advocate for a federal system in South Africa, are the Democratic Alliance and the Freedom Front Plus.

== Current legislative competence ==
=== Concurrent national and provincial legislative competence (Schedule 4 to the Constitution) ===
- Administration of indigenous forests
- Agriculture
- Airports other than international and national airports
- Animal control and diseases
- Casinos, racing, gambling and wagering, excluding lotteries and sports pools
- Consumer protection
- Cultural matters
- Disaster management
- Education at all levels, excluding tertiary education
- Environment
- Health services
- Housing
- Indigenous law and customary law, subject to Chapter 12 of the Constitution
- Industrial promotion
- Language policy and the regulation of official languages
- Media services directly controlled or provided by the provincial government
- Nature conservation, excluding national parks, national botanical gardens and marine resources
- Police
- Pollution control
- Population development
- Property transfer fees

==== Local government matters ====
- Air pollution
- Building regulations
- Child care facilities
- Electricity and gas reticulation
- Firefighting services
- Local tourism
- Municipal airports
- Municipal planning
- Municipal health services
- Municipal public transport
- Municipal public works only in respect of the needs of municipalities in the discharge of their responsibilities to administer functions specifically assigned to them under this Constitution or any other law
- Pontoons, ferries, jetties, piers and harbours, excluding the regulation of international and national shipping and matters related thereto
- Stormwater management systems in built-up areas
- Trading regulations
- Water and sanitation services limited to potable water supply systems and domestic waste-water and sewage disposal systems

=== Exclusive provincial legislative competence (Schedule 5 to the Constitution) ===
- Abattoirs
- Ambulance services
- Archives other than national archives
- Libraries other than national libraries
- Liquor licences
- Museums other than national museums
- Provincial planning
- Provincial cultural matters
- Provincial recreation and amenities
- Provincial sport
- Provincial roads and traffic
- Veterinary services, excluding regulation of the profession
- Different legal age of majority groups to some provinces

==== Local government matters ====
- Beaches and amusement facilities
- Billboards and the display of advertisements in public places
- Cemeteries, funeral parlours and crematoria
- Cleansing
- Control of public nuisances
- Control of undertakings that sell liquor to the public
- Facilities for the accommodation, care and burial of animals
- Fencing and fences
- Licensing of dogs
- Licensing and control of undertakings that sell food to the public
- Local amenities
- Local sport facilities
- Markets
- Municipal abattoirs
- Municipal parks and recreation
- Municipal roads
- Noise pollution
- Pounds
- Public places
- Refuse removal, refuse dumps and solid waste disposal
- Street trading
- Street lighting
- Traffic and parking

== Further developments ==
The Democratic Alliance has suggested that certain policing powers should be devolved to the provinces. The African National Congress has repeatedly equated federalism to Apartheid.
