= Independent Party (South Africa) =

Political party (1987–1989)

The Independent Party (Afrikaans: Onafhanklike Party) was founded in 1987 by Denis Worrall and Wynand Malan. Its purpose was to protest against the National Party's shift in policy from reform to security. It contested the 1987 election as the Independent Movement and Malan, its founder, won its only seat. Disappointed by this result, Malan left to form the National Democratic Movement (NDM), and Worrall assumed the leadership.

Unlike most other legal non-racialist parties of the Apartheid era, the IP's membership was mainly composed of Afrikaners rather than English-speakers. The IP absorbed many members of the New Republic Party after its dissolution. In 1989, it merged with the Progressive Federal Party (and others including Malan's NDM) to form the Democratic Party (DP), now known as the Democratic Alliance (DA).

Worral won the Berea ward in the 1989 election, and retired from politics before the 1994 election.
