= Democratic Party (South Africa, 1973) =

Political party in South Africa

The Democratic Party was a South African political party formed in 1973 by former Interior Minister Theo Gerdener after he broke away from the ruling National Party. The party hoped to be a rallying point for the verligte (enlightened) Nationalists who had grown disillusioned with the hardline apartheid government of John Vorster and attracted support from younger Afrikaners. The party advocated liberalizing the country's apartheid laws to some degree and emancipating Asian and "Coloured" South Africans and had a goal of re-establishing South Africa as a confederation of ethnic groupings.

The party contested seven seats in the 1974 South African election but failed to elect any members to the South African parliament. In 1975, Gerdener contested a parliamentary by-election on behalf of the DP in what was supposed to be a safe government seat and lost by only 30 votes. In 1977, the Democratic Party merged with the United Party to form the New Republic Party.

== See also ==
- National Union (1960-1961) break away party from the Nationals.
