= Denis Worrall =

South African diplomat (1935–2023)

Denis John Worrall

Co-leader of the Democratic Party
- In office 1989–1990 Serving with Wynand Malan; Zach de Beer

Personal details
- Born: 29 May 1935 Benoni, Transvaal, Union of South Africa
- Died: 18 May 2023 (aged 87)
- Citizenship: South African citizenship
- Education: University of Cape Town

Denis John Worrall (29 May 1935 – 18 May 2023) was a South African academic, businessman, politician and diplomat.

== Life and career ==
Denis John Worrall was born in Benoni, Transvaal, Union of South Africa on 29 May 1935. He was appointed a Senator for the Cape Province in 1974, representing the segregationist National Party. He was subsequently elected to the House of Assembly as National Party MP for Cape Town Gardens. He was chairman of the Constitutional Committee of the President's Council until 1982, and was Ambassador to Australia from 1982 to 1984, and then Ambassador to the United Kingdom from 1984 to 1987.

As a member of the NP's relatively moderate faction, Worrall objected to the shift from reform to security after 1985. He resigned his post in order to return to South Africa and enter politics again, standing as an independent against the senior government minister Chris Heunis in the Helderberg constituency in the 1987 election, but lost by 39 votes.

Worrall formed the conservative but anti-apartheid Independent Party in 1988 after Wynand Malan, also an independent in the 1987 election, had formed the National Democratic Movement in October, 1987. Worrall subsequently became one of the three co-leaders of the Democratic Party, and won the Berea constituency for the DP in the 1989 election.

Worrall taught at universities in South Africa (University of Natal and University of the Witwatersrand), Nigeria, and the United States and edited the first general textbook on the South African government and politics.

Worrall was the Vice Chairman of the International Bank of Southern Africa, chairman of the Australian mining company Crown Diamonds N.L., director of several other companies and a consultant to the World Bank and several multinational corporations.

In 2015, Worrall founded The Cape Messenger, an online daily newspaper with a focus on business and politics in South Africa.

Denis Worrall died on 18 May 2023, at the age of 87.
