= 1981 South African general election =

- 29 April 1981

165 of the 177 seats in the House of Assembly 83 seats needed for a majority
- Registered: 2,290,626
- Turnout: 59.90% (▲11.38pp)
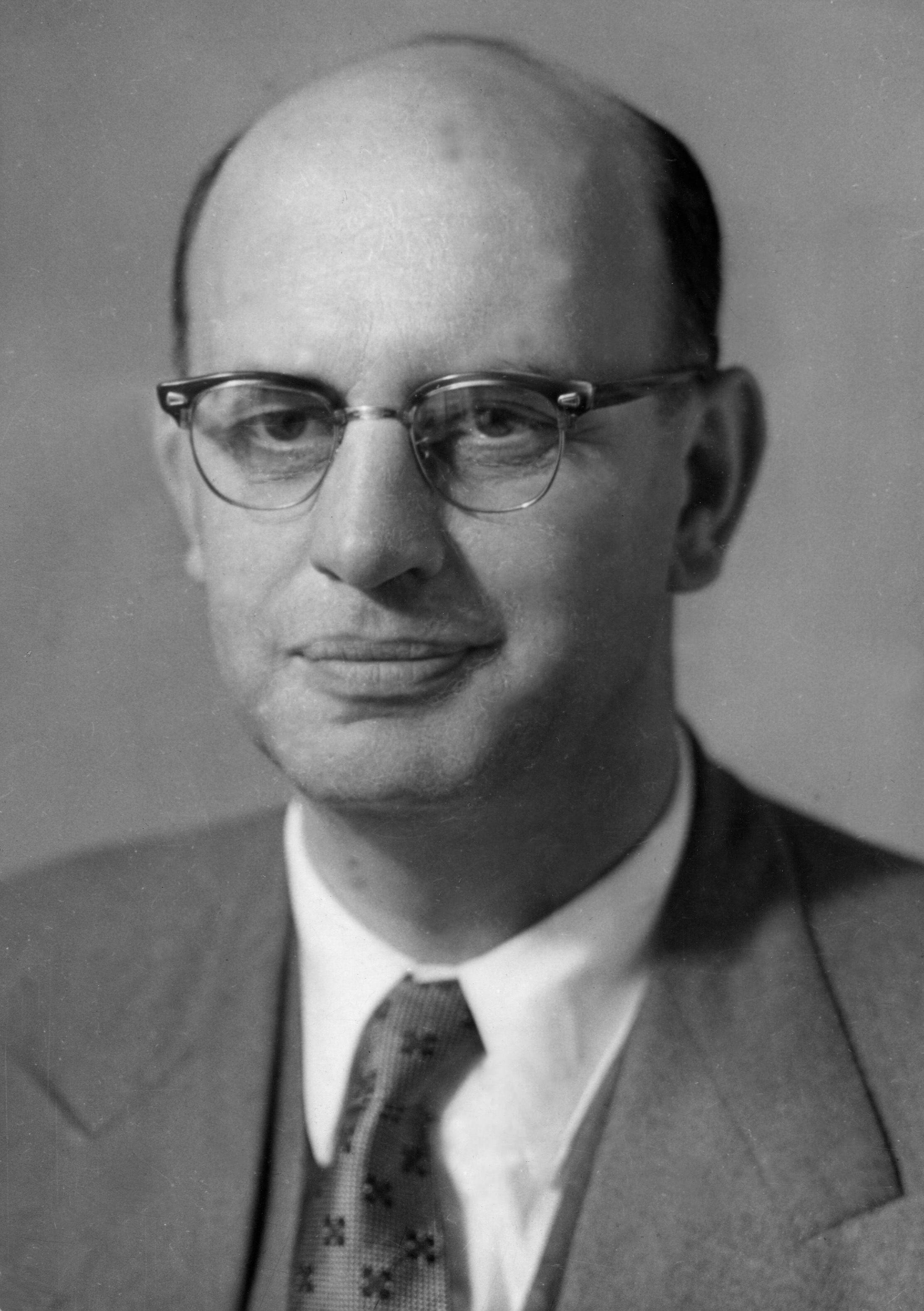
	First party	Second party	Third party
		PFP	NRP
Leader	P. W. Botha	Frederik van Zyl Slabbert	Vause Raw
Party	National	Progressive	New Republic
Last election	65.34%, 134 seats	16.95%, 17 seats	12.15%, 10 seats
Seats won	131	26	8
Seat change	▼3	▲9	▼2
Popular vote	778,371	265,297	93,603
Percentage	57.66%	19.65%	6.93%
Swing	▼7.68pp	▲2.70pp	▼5.22pp
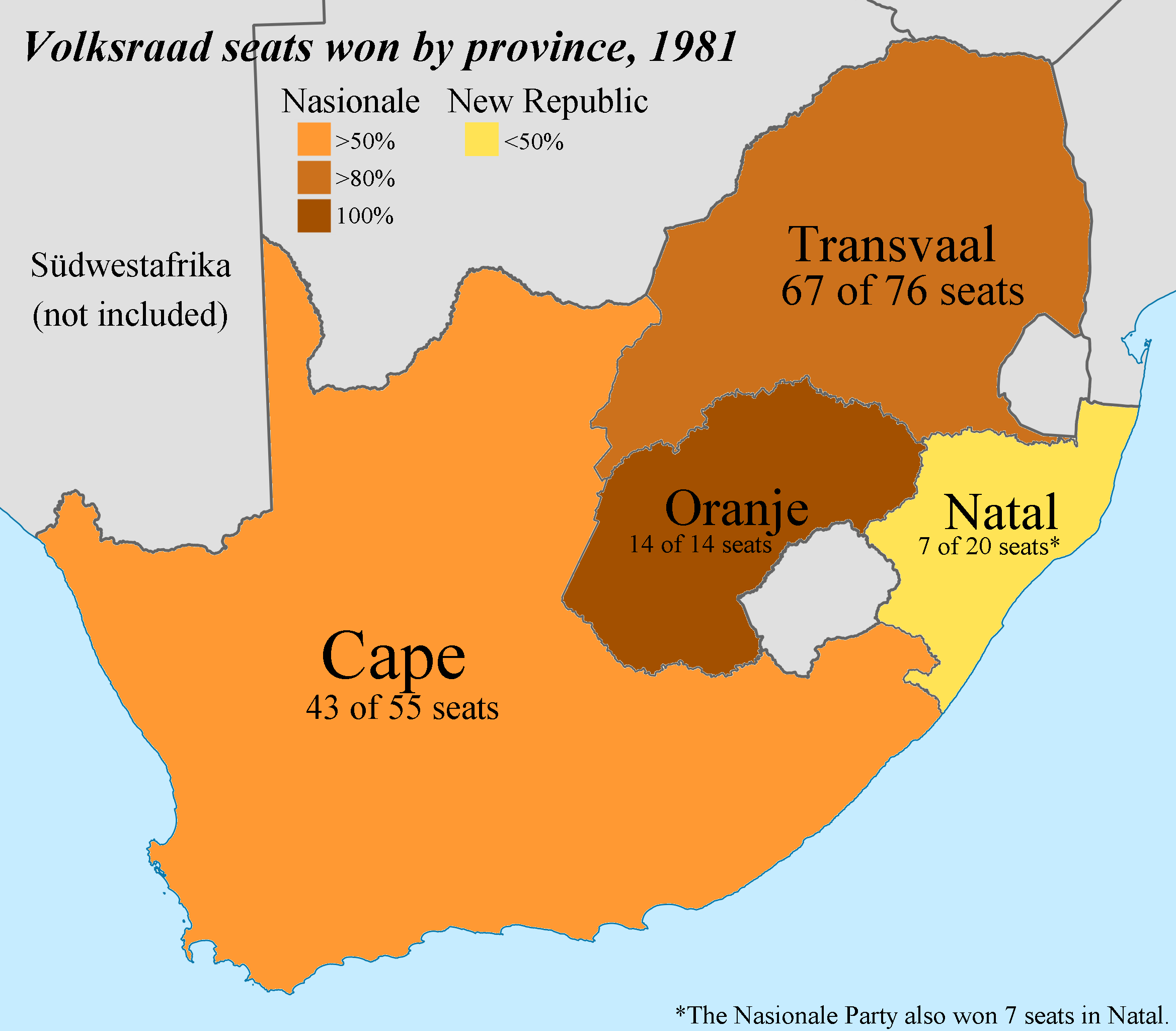
- Results by province
Prime Minister before election
P. W. Botha
National
Elected Prime Minister
P. W. Botha
National

General elections were held in South Africa on 29 April 1981. The National Party, under the leadership of P. W. Botha since 1978, lost some support, but achieved another landslide victory, winning 131 of 165 directly elected seats in the House of Assembly.

Meanwhile, the Progressive Federal Party – led since 1979 by Frederik van Zyl Slabbert, an Afrikaner – increased its representation to 26 seats, thereby consolidating its position as the official opposition. The Herstigte Nasionale Party (HNP) now under the leadership of Jaap Marais and representing right-wing Afrikaner conservatives, received 14.1% of the vote. The HNP's tally marked a historic result; twice that of the former official opposition NRP, and within a touching distance of the liberal PFP, but failed to win a seat under the first-past-the-post system due to splitting its voter base with the NP in more liberal areas and being decisively defeated in the Afrikaner heartlands. In 1985, under the same parliament, HNP candidate Louis Stofberg managed a win in a by-election for Sasolburg, but the success was soon overrun by the Conservative Party under NP renegade Andries Treurnicht.

Despite divisions among the opposition, the NP lost three seats compared to its record 1977 result.

== Background ==
The 1981 elections were the first since the abolition of the Senate and ongoing constitutional changes meant to bring in a more presidential system. The House of Assembly had become the sole chamber of Parliament.

The elections were also the last to be held under the then 1961 constitution, under which South Africa had become a republic, while retaining a Westminster-style parliamentary system. In foreign policy, the Lancaster House Agreement and the shift to black majority rule and a ZANU–PF government in newly independent Zimbabwe the preceding year, was likely to have affected the results, including boost for the HNP and increased white wariness of the government's policy. The Angolan War and Border Wars had also raged on without obvious results, with a South Africa-backed UNITA in fierce opposition to the government of the MPLA in Luanda. Exceeding costs, and failure to accomplish strategic goals would have alienated both liberal and more hawkish voters dissatisfied with developments in a continent which, a decade earlier, South Africa would have dominated militarily. The 1976 Soweto uprising and following sanctions and boycotts still affected the South African economy, causing stagnant wages, unemployment and psychological alienation driving increased voter dissatisfaction.

Although technically a Westminster system, Botha's initial reforms of the House of Assembly now included twelve additional members, four of whom were appointed by the State President and eight were indirectly elected by the directly elected members. These reforms secured the NP's existing majority, which became even more important with the planned introduction of the Tricameral Parliament in 1984, with the NP's majority role becoming more fragile with the introduction of Coloured and Indian representatives, albeit in different chambers. The elected additional members were chosen by means of proportional representation, by means of the single transferable vote.

== Campaign ==
In the weeks leading up to the 1981 South African general election, P. W. Botha was confronted by hard-line Afrikaner hecklers, some of whom were supporters of the Herstigte Nasionale Party, resisting to changes to the status quo of apartheid. On the final night of the campaign trail, Botha vowed that "As long as there is a National Party Government, we won't hand over South-West Africa to the authority of SWAPO."

== Results ==
Of the twelve appointed and indirectly elected members, 11 were National Party representatives and one was from the Progressive Federal Party.

Party	Votes	%	Seats	+/–
National Party	778,371	57.66	131	–3
Progressive Federal Party	265,297	19.65	26	+9
Herstigte Nasionale Party	191,249	14.17	0	0
New Republic Party	93,603	6.93	8	–2
National Conservative Party	19,149	1.42	0	New
Other parties and independents	2,264	0.17	0	0
Presidential appointees			4	New
Indirectly-elected members			8	New
Total	1,349,933	100.00	177	+12
Valid votes	1,349,933	98.39		
Invalid/blank votes	22,086	1.61		
Total votes	1,372,019	100.00		
Registered voters/turnout	2,290,626	59.90		

=== By province ===
Province	National	New Republic	Progressive	Total
Transvaal	67	0	9	76
Cape	43	1	11	55
Natal	7	7	6	20
Orange Free State	14	0	0	14
Total	131	8	26	165

== See also ==
- 18th South African Parliament
- White backlash
