= Democratic Party (South Africa) =

Democratic Party Demokratiese Party
- Abbreviation: DP
- First Leaders: Zach de Beer; Denis Worrall; Wynand Malan
- Last Leader: Tony Leon
- Founded: 1989
- Dissolved: 24 June 2000
- Merger of: PFP; NRP; Independent Party
- Succeeded by: Democratic Alliance
- Headquarters: Cape Town; Western Cape
- Ideology: Liberalism; Conservative liberalism; Anti-apartheid (until 1994)
- Political position: Centre-right
- International affiliation: Liberal International
- Colours: Blue
- Slogan: "Fight Back"

The Democratic Party (DP; Afrikaans: Demokratiese Party) was a South African political party that was the forerunner of the Democratic Alliance. Although the Democratic Party name dates from 1989, the party existed under other labels throughout the apartheid years, when it was the parliamentary opposition to the ruling National Party's policies.

== Background ==
The Progressive Federal Party had formed the main parliamentary opposition to the Apartheid regime in the whites-only House of Assembly since 1977. But the party was ousted as the official opposition in the 1987 election and pushed into third place behind the far-right Conservative Party, which opposed even the limited reforms the NP had recently implemented. This led to great disillusionment amongst South Africa's white liberal community, and some questioned the merit of continuing to serve in the apartheid parliament. By 1989, they had regrouped, however, and aimed to strengthen the white parliamentary resistance to apartheid; the Progressive Federal Party merged with two smaller reform-minded parties, the Independent Party and the National Democratic Movement (NDM), to become the Democratic Party. The new party had three co-leaders from each of the parties that had entered the merger: Zach de Beer, Denis Worrall and Wynand Malan. De Beer, from the dominant PFP-faction, eventually became the sole leader, however.

== History ==
The DP showed its political strength by winning a local by-election in the mostly Afrikaner Linden suburb in Johannesburg, described as a "shock upset" that showed the NP that voters were ready for change. It went on to win 34 seats in the 1989 election, up from 20 before the vote.

In 1990, the NP shifted its race policies towards the centre. President F. W. de Klerk released Nelson Mandela and announced the unbanning of struggle organisations such as the African National Congress, while embracing liberal democracy and opening up its membership to all races. This shift narrowed the political space available to the DP, and the party saw itself further marginalized during the Codesa negotiations which were dominated by the ANC and NP. In the 1994 election, the party won a disappointing 7 seats in the democratic parliament.

=== Post-1994 ===
Following the 1994 election, Tony Leon became the party's sole leader.

Under Leon's leadership, the DP would become the most active and influential opposition party in the National Assembly, despite its small size. A mid-term review in 1997 found that the party's seven members of parliament had asked 50% as many parliamentary questions as the members of the National Party, despite being more than ten times smaller. In 1998, political columnist Howard Barrell wrote that "Seven DP MPs make their National Party counterparts look like 80 feather dusters". The DP won its first local by-election in a traditional NP constituency in March 1997, and this was followed by several others.

=== 1998 to 2000 ===
By 1998, the party was growing its support base significantly, and after the 1999 election, the DP, under the leadership of Leon, became Official Opposition to the ANC-led government, winning 38 seats. In the Western Cape province, it achieved kingmaker status and became the junior partner in a governing coalition with the renamed New National Party (NNP).

This electoral success came at a price, however. The party's new supporters largely came from the National Party and consisted overwhelmingly of ethnic minorities, mainly whites. The DP had contested the 1999 election with a highly negative campaign under the controversial slogan "Fight Back", and many, such as ANC President Thabo Mbeki, were of the view that it was "the transformation of the DP into a right wing political party" that allowed it to capture these voters. Leon and other party leaders dismissed this, however, maintaining that the new supporters would not lead the DP to change its principles. Instead, he said the new recruits would have to ascribe to the liberal-democratic values to which the DP had historically adhered.

=== Formation of the Democratic Alliance ===
To unify national opposition against the ANC government, the DP and the NNP began planning a merger of the two parties. Accordingly, they formed the Democratic Alliance (DA) in June 2000. The merger agreement was short-lived, with the NNP leaving the alliance in 2001, but the DA closed ranks and retained the new creation, establishing it at all levels of government from 2003 onwards.

== Election results ==
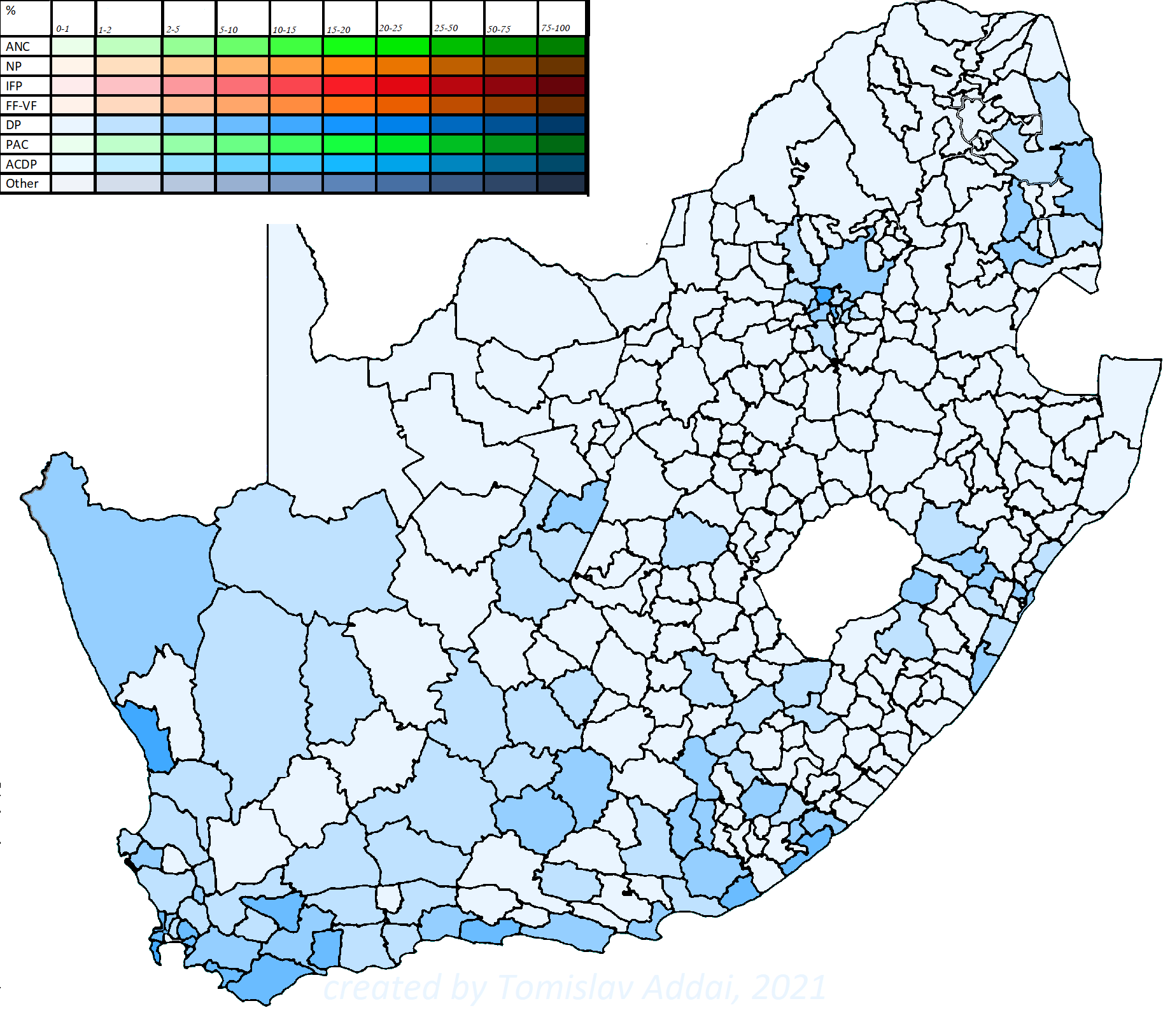
Share of the Democratic Party votes in 1994.

Election	Leader	Votes	%	Seats
1989	Zach de Beer	431,444	20.00	33 / 178
1994	Zach de Beer	338,426	1.73	7 / 400
1999	Tony Leon	1,527,337	9.56	38 / 400

== See also ==
- Contributions to liberal theory
- Liberal democracy
- Liberalism
  - Liberalism in South Africa
- List of liberal parties
