= New Republic Party (South Africa) =

1977–1988 political party in South Africa

New Republic Party Nuwe Republiekparty (Afrikaans)
- Leader: Sir de Villiers Graaff (interim); Radclyffe Cadman; Vause Raw; Bill Sutton
- Founded: 1977
- Dissolved: 1987
- Merger of: United Party; Democratic Party
- Merged into: Democratic Party
- Succeeded by: Independent Party
- Ideology: Conservatism; Power sharing Pro-Commonwealth
- Political position: Centre-right

The New Republic Party (NRP) was a South African political party. It was formed as the successor to the disbanded United Party (UP) in 1977 and as a merger with the smaller Democratic Party. It drew its support mainly from the then Province of Natal, and tried to strike a moderate course between the apartheid policy of the ruling National Party (NP) and the liberal policies of the Progressive Federal Party (PFP).

== Background ==
The United Party had been the main opposition in the House of Assembly since it lost power in the 1948 election, but it was severely weakened by a split in 1975. To gain new support, the UP then merged with the Democratic Party to form the New Republic Party in 1977. After the UP wound up, the last UP leader, Sir de Villiers Graaff served as the interim national leader of the new party, with Radclyffe Cadman as parliamentary leader. Before the 1977 election, Graaff resigned and Cadman became the national leader.

However, a significant number of UP parliamentarians refused to remain with the new party; some joined the anti-apartheid PFP, and six were expelled and formed the centrist South African Party, eventually joining the majority NP. The NRP held 23 seats at the dissolution of parliament in 1977, down from the 41 the United Party had held previously.

== Election results ==
The 1977 South African general election left the New Republic Party with only 10 parliamentary seats, and it lost the position as official opposition to the Progressive Federal Party. As Cadman was defeated in the election, a new leader was needed. Vause Raw was elected leader of the New Republic Party.

Raw discredited the party in a string of by-election defeats from 1977 to 1980, by making "extravagant" claims of support and predicting victory in areas where the party had no prospects. In fact, the NRP would win just two by-elections during its eleven-year existence: a provincial council seat in Natal, South Coast in July 1979, and another in East London in October 1980.

In August 1980, Raw announced that the party was "broke" outside of Natal. The party's support base stabilised somewhat, and it lost only 2 seats in the 1981 South African general election, while retaining eight. The election however confirmed the NRP:s status as a Natal-based party. Almost all its members in the House of Assembly were from Natal, and it won the 1981 election to the Natal Provincial Council, securing 14 of the 20 seats available. By contrast, the party won only 1 out of 55 seats on the Cape Provincial Council, and no seats at all on the Transvaal Provincial Council.

In 1984, Raw was replaced as leader by Bill Sutton. However, the NP's shift towards reform in the early 1980s under the leadership of P. W. Botha would allow it to make inroads in the NRP's remaining voter base and the party retained only 1 seat, held by Sutton, in the 1987 South African general election, the last one it contested.

Sutton retained his seat until the 1989 election.

== Platform and dissolution ==
The anti-apartheid PFP considered the NRP "thoroughly racist", and the two parties "declared war" on each other. After the NRP stepped down from a by-election, which the NP subsequently won, the PFP accused the NRP of dealing with the NP in order to defeat their common enemy, the PFP.

The primary policy of the NRP was to introduce a multi-chambered parliament, with a chamber each for whites, coloureds, Indians, and urban blacks. However, in 1982 the Nationalist government announced plans for a Tricameral Parliament, which was to represent coloureds, Indians, and whites. Blacks were not represented, even though the government no longer officially expected them to migrate to the bantustans. Nevertheless, the Tricameral Parliament's marked similarity to the NRP's policy meant that it was increasingly difficult to strike a moderate course between the NP and the liberal PFP. The Tricameral policy, and an announcement that it would talk to revolutionary groups, gained the NP liberal support. There was now little enough space for the PFP to occupy on the left of white public opinion, and no room whatsoever for the NRP to split the difference between the NP and the PFP. This was shown by the party's disastrous showing in the 1987 election.

It disbanded in 1988. On dissolving the NRP, Sutton recommended that party members throw their support to the Independent Party of Denis Worrall. The IP and other NRP remnants would later merge with the PFP to form the Democratic Party, which later became the Democratic Alliance.
