= Progressive Federal Party =

1977–1989 anti-apartheid party in South Africa

Progressive Federal Party Progressiewe Federale Party (Afrikaans)
- Abbreviation: PFP
- Leader: See below
- Founded: 1977
- Dissolved: 1989
- Preceded by: Progressive Reform Party
- Merged into: Democratic Party
- Ideology: Liberalism (South African); Federalism (South African); Anti-apartheid
- Political position: Centre-left

The Progressive Federal Party (PFP) (Afrikaans: Progressiewe Federale Party) was a South African political party formed in 1977 through merger of the Progressive and Reform parties, eventually changing its name to the Progressive Federal Party. For its duration, it was the main parliamentary opposition to apartheid, instead advocating power-sharing in South Africa through a federal constitution. From the 1977 election until 1987 it was the official opposition of the country.

Its first leader was Colin Eglin, who was succeeded by Frederik van Zyl Slabbert and then Zach de Beer. Another prominent member was Harry Schwarz who had led the Reform Party and was the chairman of the Federal Executive (1976–79), finance spokesman (1975–91) and defence spokesman (1975–84). He was regarded as the PFP's greatest parliamentary performer. Its best known parliamentarian was however Helen Suzman, who was for many years the only member of the whites-only House of Assembly to speak out unequivocally against the apartheid regime.

== Formation ==
The party was preceded by the Progressive Party as the liberal opposition to the National Party. While the main opposition United Party contained liberal factions, the PP had for many years been the only purely liberal party represented in parliament. A realignment began when liberal members of the UP left to found the Reform Party in 1975, which merged with the Progressives to form the Progressive Reform Party later the same year.

In 1977, another group of United Party members left the by then rapidly declining party to form the Committee for a United Opposition, which then joined the Progressive Reform Party to form the Progressive Federal Party.

== History ==
South Africa's apartheid laws initially limited the party's membership to the country's whites, from which it drew support mainly from liberal English speakers. It opened up its membership to all races as soon as this became legal again, in 1984, but the party remained predominantly white and English. It won seats in cities such as Cape Town, Port Elizabeth, Johannesburg and Durban. It had very little support amongst Afrikaners, apart from a minority of liberal Afrikaners and the PFP was derided by right-wing whites, who claimed its initials stood for 'Packing for Perth', because of the many white liberal supporters of the 'Progs', who were emigrating to Australia.

The PFP would become the official opposition in the 1977 election, winning 17 seats. Colin Eglin, who had also led the earlier Progressive Party, was initially the leader of the PFP. But over the weekend of 3 September 1979, on the behest of Gordon Waddell, the PFP would hold a special congress in Johannesburg to elect a new leader, citing such reasons as Eglin's "uninspired" parliamentary performance, which allowed the ruling Nationalists to recover from the Muldergate slush fund scandal; his "indiscreet" contacts with black US politicians Don McHenry and Andy Young, whom many white South Africans regarded as enemies of the country; and the party's severe defeats in three recent Parliamentary by-elections. Frederik van Zyl Slabbert succeeded Eglin in 1979.

The PFP strengthened its opposition status in 1981 by increasing its representation to 27 seats.

It was ousted as the official opposition by the far-right Conservative Party in the whites-only parliamentary elections held on 6 May 1987.

This electoral blow led many of the PFP's leaders to question the value of participating in the whites-only parliament, and some of its MPs left to form the National Democratic Movement (NDM).

In 1989, the PFP and NDM merged with another small white reformist party, the Independent Party (IP), to form the Democratic Party (DP).

== Notable members ==
Leaders of the Progressive Federal Party:

		Entered office	Left office
1	Colin Eglin	1977	1979
2	Frederik van Zyl Slabbert	1979	1986
3	Colin Eglin	1986	1988
4	Zach de Beer	1988	1989

== Election results ==
Election	Leader	Votes	%	Seats
1977	Colin Eglin	177,705 #2	16.95%	17 / 178
1981	Frederik van Zyl Slabbert	265,297 #2	19.65%	26 / 178
1987	Colin Eglin	288,574 #3	14.14%	19 / 178

== See also ==
- Federalism
- Liberalism
- Contributions to liberal theory
- Liberalism worldwide
- List of liberal parties
- Liberal democracy
- Liberalism in South Africa
- Errol Musk
