= 1977 South African general election =

- 30 November 1977

164 of the 165 seats in the House of Assembly 83 seats needed for a majority
- Registered: 2,193,635
- Turnout: 48.52% (▼3.35pp)
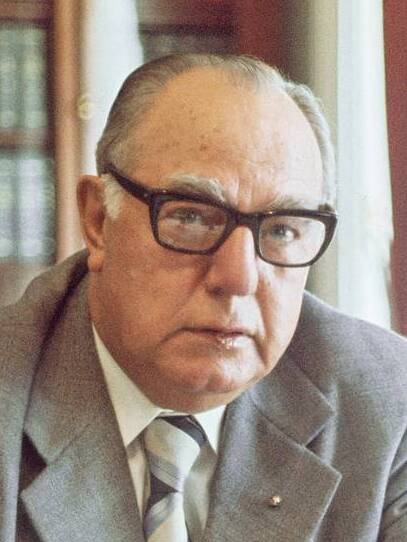

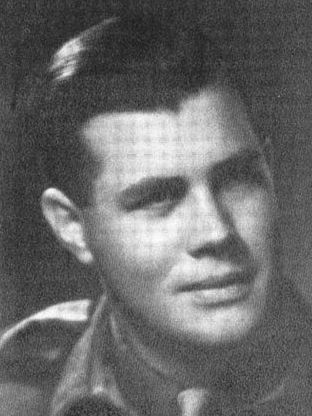
	First party	Second party	Third party
			NRP
Leader	B. J. Vorster	Colin Eglin	Radclyffe Cadman
Party	National	Progressive	New Republic
Last election	56.14%, 122 seats	6.37%, 6 seats	32.84%, 41 seats (Note: United Party and Democratic Party combined.)
Seats won	134	17	10
Seat change	▲12	▲11	▼31
Popular vote	685,035	177,705	127,335
Percentage	65.34%	16.95%	12.15%
Swing	▲9.20pp	▲10.58pp	▼20.69pp
Prime Minister before election
B. J. Vorster
National
Elected Prime Minister
B. J. Vorster
National

General elections were held in South Africa on 30 November 1977. The National Party, led by B. J. Vorster won a landslide victory in the House of Assembly with a supermajority. The newly formed Progressive Federal Party, led by Colin Eglin became the official opposition. The New Republic Party, successor to the United Party, won only 10 seats, all but one of them in Natal Province. Once again, the Herstigte Nasionale Party failed to win any seats.

In the 1977 elections, the National Party received its best-ever result with support of 65% of the vote and (after a by-election) 135 seats in parliament out of 165. However, Vorster resigned as prime minister for alleged health reasons on 28 September 1978.

== Background ==
On 11 February 1975 four liberal MPs led by Harry Schwarz broke away from the United Party and created the Reform Party. The party merged with the Progressive Party on 25 July 1975 to form the Progressive Reform Party. In 1977 another group of United Party members left the party to form the Committee for a United Opposition, which then joined the Progressive Reform Party to form the Progressive Federal Party. This proved to realign the opposition in Parliament, as the PFP became the official opposition party.

== Electoral system ==
The members of the House of Assembly were elected in single-member constituencies via first-past-the-post voting. The Senate consisted of 51 members: 43 elected by the electoral colleges of the country's four provinces (16 for the Transvaal, 11 for the Cape Province, and eight each for the Orange Free State and Natal) and eight appointed by the State President (two for each province). Only White South Africans were eligible to vote.

== Results ==
=== House of Assembly ===
Due to the death of the National Party candidate in the Springs constituency, one seat was left vacant until a by-election was held, which was won by the NP.

Party	Votes	%	Seats	+/–
National Party	685,035	65.34	134	+12
Progressive Federal Party	177,705	16.95	17	+11
New Republic Party	127,335	12.15	10	New
Herstigte Nasionale Party	34,159	3.26	0	0
South African Party	17,915	1.71	3	New
Other parties and independents	6,271	0.60	0	0
Vacant			1	–
Total	1,048,420	100.00	165	–6
Valid votes	1,048,420	98.50		
Invalid/blank votes	15,930	1.50		
Total votes	1,064,350	100.00		
Registered voters/turnout	2,193,635	48.52		
Source: Official Yearbook

== See also ==
- 17th South African Parliament
