= History of the Democratic Alliance (South Africa) =

Aspect of South African political history

Although the Democratic Alliance of South Africa in its present form is fairly new, its roots can be traced far back in South African political history, through a complex sequence of splits and mergers.

== History ==
=== Context ===
The party that won the first general elections after the formation of the Union of South Africa in 1910 was the South African Party. The SAP was a merger of the South African Party and the Afrikaner Bond of the Cape Colony, Het Volk of Transvaal and Orangia Unie of the Orange Free State. The Progressive Party of the Cape Colony merged with the Progressive Association of Transvaal and the Constitutional Party of the Orange Free State to form the Unionist Party. The southern Natal province had no institutionalized parties, but politicians from the province joined the new parties. In the Cape Colony, the SAP were proponents of a multiracial franchise, and its most prominent members were John Xavier Merriman and William Phillip Schreinier, whereas the Progressives led by Cecil Rhodes and Leander Starr Jameson were more firmly pro-British in orientation.

In the Union, the SAP was a broad-based party committed to unity between Afrikaners and English-speakers, typified by its leaders Louis Botha and Jan Smuts. Its more pro-British tendencies provoked a reaction from Afrikaner nationalists who formed the National Party in 1914, led by J. B. M. Hertzog. The NP's rise in support and the decline of the Unionist Party led to their merger under the leadership of Smuts in 1920. The SAP lost power to a National-Labour coalition in 1924.

In 1934, the NP and the SAP entered into a coalition, which led to the creation of a merged United Party (UP), although a hard-line nationalist faction led by D. F. Malan stayed out. The United Party included both liberal and conservative elements, but followed a pro-Union, pro-British policy which resulted in Hertzog and his followers withdrawing from it in 1939. The United Party lost power in 1948 to the National Party under Malan, who began to implement the policy of apartheid. Smuts died two years later, his probable heir Jan Hendrik Hofmeyr having died in 1948. Hofmeyr and Piet van der Byl were said to have epitomized a more progressive outlook when addressing the racial question.

The United Party continued to exist after 1959 and was the source of several breakaway groups which merged with later ancestor parties. The party's uncertain response to apartheid under the leadership of J.G.N. Strauss and De Villiers Graaff provoked considerable discord. Generally the party was critical of the injustices of the government's segregationist policies, but offered no clear alternative until its waning years in the 1970s, although it took an increasingly critical stance. In 1953, the Liberal Party was formed in response and existed until 1968, when it dissolved rather than restrict its membership on a racial basis. The Progressive Party was formed in 1959.

=== Progressive Movement ===
The historical predecessor of the modern-day Democratic Alliance, was The Progressive Party (PP), and was founded in 1959 when liberal members seceded from the United Party (UP). They could not agree with the inability of the UP to present an alternative to the National Party's apartheid policy. The PP emphasized constitutional reform, a Bill of Rights, an independent judiciary and the evolution towards federalism. These reform proposals were combined with advocacy of a free market economy. In 1961 only Helen Suzman was elected in parliament. For 13 years she was the only opponent of racial discrimination and other apartheid regime's abuses in the whites-only parliament, fighting against detention without trial, pass laws and influx control. From 1971 Colin Eglin was the party leader, without being a member of parliament himself. In 1974 the party won seven seats.

A year later, in July 1975, the Progressive Party merged with the Reform Party (RP), a breakaway party of the United Party. The outcome was the formation of the South African Progressive Reform Party (PRP). Former Reform Party leader Harry Schwarz was appointed chairman of the PRP's National Executive, while Eglin was elected leader.

By 1977, support for the United Party was in rapid decline, and further dissident UP members formed a Committee for a United Opposition, before joining the PRP to form the Progressive Federal Party (PFP). Later that year, the PFP became official opposition following the 1977 general election. The PFP drew support mainly from liberal English-speaking white South Africans, as owing to South Africa's apartheid laws, its membership was limited to the country's whites. The PFP was derided by right-wing whites, who claimed its initials stood for 'Packing for Perth', on account of the many white liberal supporters of the 'Progs' who were emigrating to Australia. What was left of the United Party merged with the Democratic Party, which had formed by moderate National Party dissidents in 1973 and led by former interior minister Theo Gerdener, to form the New Republic Party (NRP). Another offshoot of the UP was the South African Party (reviving the name of the original SAP). Both the NRP and SAP were more conservative than the PFP, but envisioned a federal solution to the country's racial question. The SAP grew closer to the ruling National Party and merged into it by 1980, and the growing verligte ("enlightened") tendency within the National Party itself espoused expanded political participation for non-whites. The NRP was overshadowed by the PFP as an opposition party, in terminal decline by 1987 and dissolving itself shortly after. At the same time, disaffected NP members such as Denis Worrall and Wynand Malan broke away and stood as anti-apartheid and progressive independents in the 1987 general election. Worrall later formed the Independent Party and Malan formed the National Democratic Movement.

Frederik van Zyl Slabbert, PFP leader since 1979, resigned from parliament in 1986 because it had, in his view, become irrelevant. Later he formed The Institute for Democratic Alternatives in South Africa (IDASA). He was succeeded by Colin Eglin. The PFP was ousted as the official opposition by the far-right Conservative Party in the whites-only parliamentary elections held on 6 May 1987. This electoral blow led many of the PFP's leaders to question the value of participating in the whites-only parliament, and some of its MPs left to join the National Democratic Movement (NDM). The formation of the Independent Party (IP) of Denis Worrall further split the liberal opposition.

All of these currents reunited into the Democratic Party by 1989.

=== Parliamentary opposition to apartheid ===
Following the realignment of opposition politics in the 1970s, with the fall of the United Party and subsequent rise of the Progressive Federal Party as successor as the official parliamentary opposition, the National Party's authoritarian and apartheid policies faced much stronger parliamentary opposition.

==== Opposition to press restrictions ====
In 1979, the PFP launched the "strongest parliamentary measures" possible against the Advocate-General Act, that would prohibit press from reporting on allegations of corruption and irregularities without first having such allegations cleared. PFP Colin Eglin launched the attack on the bill, stating that it was an attempt by the National Party to "muzzle the press and deny the public right to know". Helen Suzman, who attempted to delay the bill, argued that it was "essential that the press be no further restricted than it already was. It is essential that nothing hinders the press in its duty to inform the public".

In 1980, the National Party introduced the National Key Points Act that made those responsible for unauthorised reporting of incidents of sabotage or other attacks on declared national strategic targets a crime. These moves were slammed by MPs such as Harry Schwarz, who stated that "Society as a whole is not condemned because individuals transgress, and nor should the press as a whole be judges by the actions of individuals." Stating that press restrictions marked a "turning point" in South African politics, he also argued that press freedom was a "precious treasure" and a free and courageous press was a major weapon in South Africa's defence against external threats.

==== Bill of Rights proposal ====
During the Constitutional Reform Debate of 1983, the PFP attempted to incorporate a 'Bill of Rights' into the new constitution proposed by the National Party, the first motion of its kind ever brought before Parliament. The motion was first submitted in August 1983, by Shadow Finance Minister Harry Schwarz. He stated that the Bill should guarantee freedom from discrimination on the ground of race, colour, sex or creed, freedom of conscience and religion, of thought, belief, opinion and expression, including freedom of the press, of association, peaceful assembly and movement, and freedom to pursue the gaining of a livelihood. It also included freedom from deprivation of life, liberty, security and property, except in accordance with the principles of fundamental justice. It would also guarantee equality before the law and equal protection and benefit of law.

Schwarz argued that if included in the constitution of the republic, it would act as a "protector of rights many people had struggled to achieve in South Africa" as well as to "act as an inspiration" to the people of South Africa and would "be a unifying factor in a country in which unity of people is essential for survival". Helen Suzman, Shadow Law and Order Minister, argued that the exclusion of the bill would lead to "a further loss of civil liberties by all South Africans - in short, to one-party, one-group dictatorship in this country". It was also argued that the bill would be a statement of intent demonstrating that the days of discrimination on the grounds of race or colour had come to an end.

While virtually all MPs of the Progressive Federal Party supported the bill, no other party in Parliament supported it. Rejecting Schwarz's proposal, Daan van der Merwe of the Conservative Party stated that the bill, based on a "leftist-liberal political philosophy", would jeopardise the freedom of the white man. New Republic Party leader Vause Raw said Schwarz "a master at platitudes" was seeking idealistic freedoms that did not exist anywhere in the world. Following the rejection of Schwarz's bill, fellow PFP MPs' Helen Suzman, Colin Eglin, Ray Swart and Dave Dalling attempted a further four times to introduce a Bill of Rights. The Bills were effectively blocked by the National Party by placing them at the end of the order paper.

=== Democratic era ===
After the 1987 elections, the new PFP leader Zach de Beer concluded negotiations with the IP and the NDM to merge into the Democratic Party in 1989, and proceeded to win 33 seats in the elections that year. The DP played a vital role in the negotiation of an interim constitution which includes most of the original progressive principles and ideals. In 1991 Harry Schwarz, one of the party's founders and most prominent leaders was appointed South African Ambassador to the United States, the first opposition member to become an ambassador in South African history. In the 1994 general election, the first after apartheid was abolished, the party won only 1.7% of the vote and 10 seats in parliament. Nelson Mandela's eldest daughter Makaziwe and F. W. De Klerk's brother Willem (who was a co-founder of the party) voted for the Democratic Party in these elections.

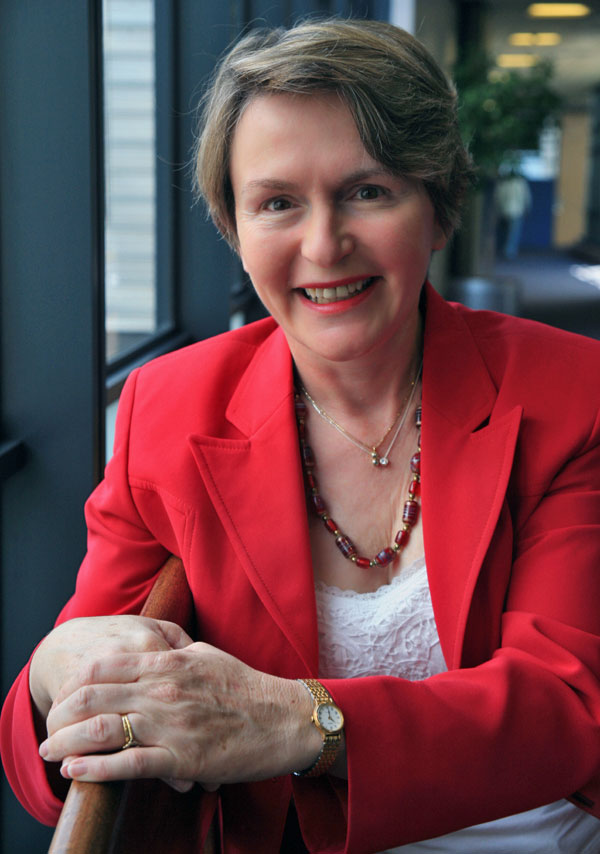
Helen Zille, DA leader 2007-2015

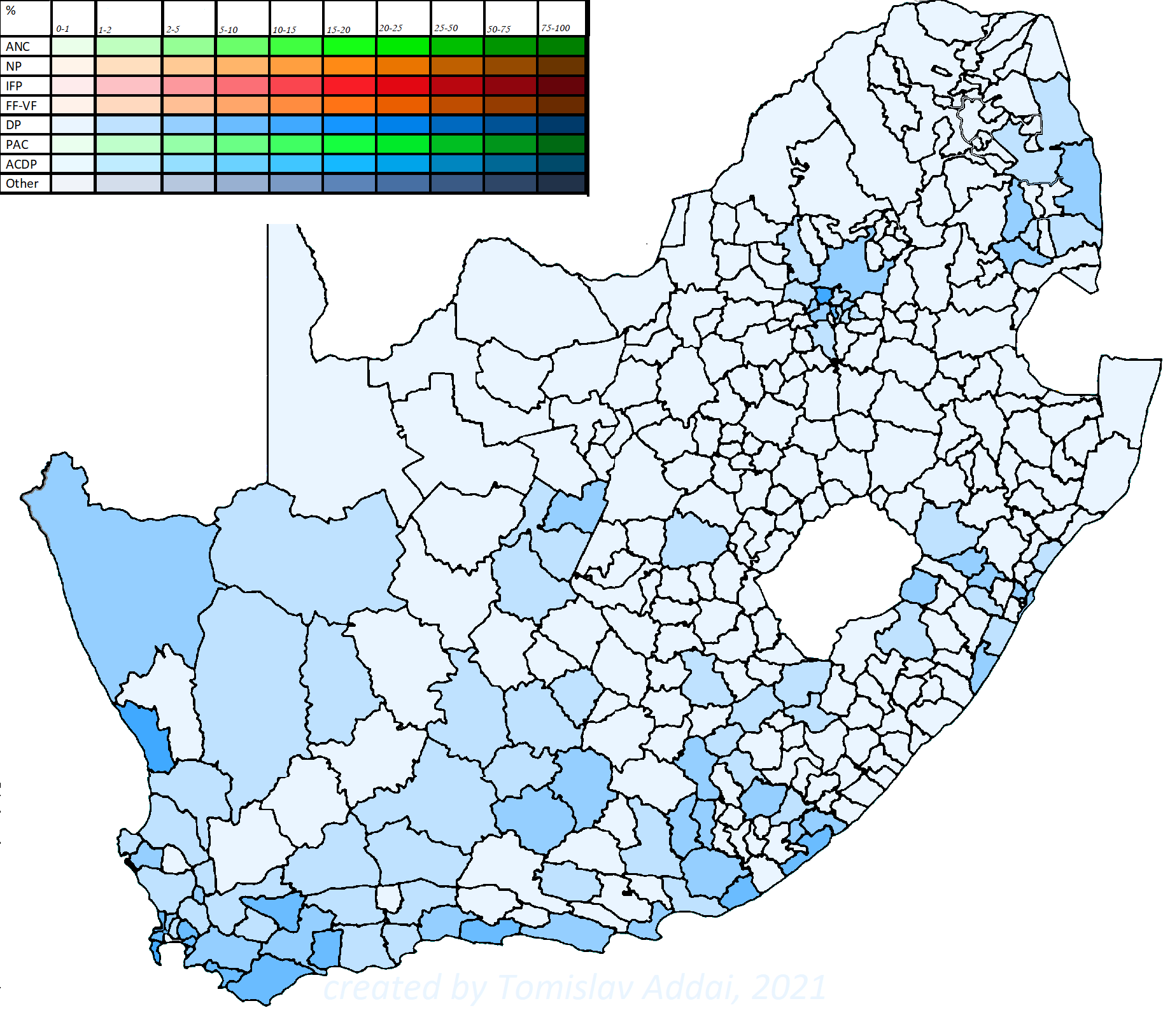
Share of Democratic Party votes per district in the 1994 election

Soon after the elections, De Beer was succeeded by Tony Leon, who emphasized the protection of human rights, federalism and free enterprise. The party improved its performance during the 1999 general election to receive 9.6% of the vote and 38 seats, replacing the New National Party (NNP) as official opposition. The NNP remained influential in the Western Cape due to its retention of the cape coloured vote, but the DP emerged as kingmakers in the province and opted to become the junior partner in a coalition government with the NNP. At this point, the NNP had officially abandoned its earlier apartheid ideology and attempted to rebrand itself as a none-racial conservative force, thus making the party an acceptable coalition partner for the DP.

In 2000, the DP joined with the NNP and the much smaller Federal Alliance to form the Democratic Alliance (DA) in preparation for the local government elections of 5 December 2000, in which members of the three parties would contest as DA candidates. Members elected to the National Assembly or the Provincial Legislatures could not defect without losing their seats, as floor crossing legislation was not yet in effect, so the DP and DA would exist side by side until 2003. The new DA won 22% of the vote in the local government elections and secured an outright majority in the Cape Town unicity with 52.5% of the vote compared to 38% for the ANC. Peter Marais became mayor of Cape Town, and the DA also took control of 20 local municipalities in the Western Cape.

The brittle alliance with the NNP lasted only until October 2001, when the NNP left to form a new alliance with the African National Congress. The Federal Alliance also left the DA to instead join the Freedom Front Plus. A new government was formed in the Western Cape consisting of the NNP and the ANC in December 2001, while the defection of some NNP councillors during the October 2002 floor-crossing window resulted in the DA losing control of Cape Town and most of the local municipalities in the Western Cape. Partially compensating for this, the DA accepted an offer late in 2002 to join the governing coalition in the KwaZulu-Natal province, in which it held cabinet seats until 2004 when that province too was won by an ANC-led coalition.

The DA decided to maintain the new creation however, and the DP was disbanded and merged into the DA during the 2003 floor-crossing window, with all remaining DP public representatives becoming DA members. With the 2004 general election, the DA and ANC increased their vote share, at the expense of other opposition parties. The DA won 12.4% of the votes and 50 seats, and remains the second largest political party in South Africa. By contrast, the NNP was in terminal decline and won only 7 seats. It merged with the ANC in 2005. A political realignment had occurred in the sense that the white and Coloured electorate the NP/NNP had retained in 1994 had in large part shifted to the DA, though other parties such as the new Independent Democrats had also benefited from the NNP's collapse. The NNP had also been beset by internal dissension and an uncertain position towards the ANC, later cooperating with it.

On 1 March 2006, the DA won 16.3% of the vote in the local government elections, and regained control of the City of Cape Town from the ANC - the only Metropolitan Council in South Africa not controlled by the ANC. Helen Zille was elected executive mayor on 15 March 2006 and formed a coalition with six smaller parties as the DA failed to win an outright majority in the council. In the local government elections the DA had won 41.8% of the vote in Cape Town compared to 38.5% for the ANC. In 2007, Zille went on to win the leadership of the party in a landslide vote following the retirement of long-serving Tony Leon. As Zille opted to remain as mayor of Cape Town as well as adopt the position of leader of the DA, a separate post of parliamentary leader was established. The role was first filled by Sandra Botha, until announcing her retirement from party politics in January 2009. She was succeeded by Athol Trollip. Later, Lindiwe Mazibuko and Mmusi Maimane would also serve in the role.

==== Becoming a party of government ====
The DA was then "re-launched" in preparation for the upcoming general election. DA convened a meeting on Constitutional Hill to present the party as one which no longer acts as an opposition but offers voters another choice for government. Along with this, the party also introduced a new logo, featuring a rising sun over the colours of the South African flag (representing the Rainbow Nation), and a new slogan, "One Nation, One Future." This is in line with the new strategy the party was implementing with regard to a non-racial South Africa where everyone has equal opportunities. Party leader, Helen Zille said the new DA would be "more reflective of our rich racial, linguistic and cultural heritage". Zille has emphasised that she wants the party to be a "party for all the people" and not decline into a "shrinking, irrelevant minority". She has also spoken out against the party's image as being exclusively 'white'.

In the 2009 general election, after a campaign that was more than ever disproportionally focused on the Western Cape province, DA increased its national share of the vote to 16,7%, winning 67 seats in the National Assembly. Much of this increase came from the Western Cape, where DA won an outright majority on the provincial ballot thanks to a large increase of coloured support at the expense of several of the established parties. Zille was later sworn in as the provincial premier. Owing to its modest growth in the rest of South Africa, however, the newly formed Congress of the People (COPE) overtook the DA as official opposition in several provinces.

The DA consolidated its dominance in the Western Cape during the 2011 municipal elections, aided in part by a merger agreement with the Independent Democrats; DA won control of two-thirds of the councils in the province. The party also improved its position in the rest of the country, made easier by the sharp decline of COPE following internal leadership disputes. DA built on these gains in the 2014 general election, in which it retained the Western Cape with an increased majority and won 22,2% nationally with 89 seats, the best performance of any party other than the ANC in democratic South Africa. Its campaign to win the Gauteng province failed, but the party grew its support substantially there and in other provinces.

In 2015, Helen Zille stepped down as national leader (but remained premier). Mmusi Maimane, who had served as parliamentary leader since the latest election, was elected as the new party leader, the first black person to hold the position.

In the general elections of 2019, the DA's national support declined for the first time in its history. The party retained control of the Western Cape but with a reduced majority and failed to win Gauteng once again. The conservative Freedom Front Plus (FF+) made significant gains on the DA in the Afrikaner community. In the aftermath of the election, the FF+ continued to make inroads in former DA strongholds.

In October 2019, leader of the Democratic Alliance (DA), Mmusi Maimane, resigned.

The current leader of the party is John Steenhuisen, who was announced as the new leader on 1 November 2020 after the party's Federal Congress. He had previously acted as the interim leader of the party from November 2019 to November 2020. Helen Zille is chairperson of both the Federal Council and the Federal Executive, the highest decision-making structures of the party.

In aftermath of the 2024 general election, the DA entered into a ruling grand coalition with the ANC and various other parties, called a government of national unity, formed between ten parties with jointly 287 seats in the House of Assembly (72%). The DA also governs several major metropolitan municipalities and has governed the Western Cape, one of South Africa's nine provinces, since the 2009 general election, and has governed the City of Cape Town since 2006.

On 28 May 2026, The DA gained a 100% demographically Black South African township ward from the ANC in a by-election for the first time in the country's history of democracy, in Evaton, Emfuleni

=== Fiftieth anniversary ===
On 13 November 2009, the Democratic Alliance marked the fiftieth anniversary of the formation of the Progressive Party in Cape Town in the old chamber of parliament. Around 20 former MPs from the DA's predecessor parties attended. Elder statesmen of the DA Colin Eglin and Harry Schwarz, along with then DA leader Helen Zille gave speeches. While praising the liberal contribution to opposing and ending apartheid, they stated how South Africa and the DA still had much work to do. Harry Schwarz delivered his last speech, before his death in February 2010. He paid tribute to Helen Zille, calling her the embodiment of the principles he and others had fought for and warned that "Freedom is incomplete if it is exercised in poverty", a phase he often used. Colin Eglin praised the liberal opposition to apartheid, stating that the principles that they had fought had been "entrenched in the Constitution". Helen Zille also quoted the first Progressive Party leader, Jan Steytler, that in 1959 had stated that South Africa wanted to "face the future, not with fear, but with confidence that we can live together in harmony in a multi-racial country."

== Leaders ==
Leaders of the Democratic Alliance, and its predecessor parties:

		Entered office	Left office	Party name
1	Jan Steytler ^{1}	November 1959	December 1970	Progressive Party
2	Harry Lawrence^{2}	December 1970	February 1971	Progressive Party
3	Harry Schwarz ^{3}	February 1975	July 1975	Progressive Party; Reform Party
3	Colin Eglin^{4}	February 1971	July 1975	Progressive Party; Reform Party
3	Colin Eglin^{4}	July 1975	1977	Progressive Reform Party
3	Colin Eglin^{4}	1977	1979	Progressive Federal Party
4	Frederik van Zyl Slabbert	1979	1986	Progressive Federal Party
5	Colin Eglin	1986	1988	Progressive Federal Party
6	Zach de Beer	1988	1989	Progressive Federal Party
7,8	Zach de Beer, Denis Worrall and Wynand Malan^{5}	1989	1994	Democratic Party
9	Tony Leon	1994	2000	Democratic Party
9	Tony Leon	2000	May 2007	Democratic Alliance
10	Helen Zille^{6}	May 2007	May 2015	Democratic Alliance
11	Mmusi Maimane	May 2015	October 2019	Democratic Alliance
12	John Steenhuisen	November 2019	April 2026	Democratic Alliance
13	Geordin Hill-Lewis	April 2026	Present	

- ^{1} Between 1961 and 1970, Steytler served as party leader from outside Parliament, where Helen Suzman was the party's sole representative.
- ^{2} Interim leader.
- ^{3} Schwarz was leader of the Reform Party that broke away from the United Party and which merged with the Progressive Party.
- ^{4} First Progressive Leader of the Opposition in Parliament (from 1977).
- ^{5} Co-leaders, following the formation of the Democratic Party in 1989.
- ^{6} Zille, like Steytler and Lawrence, served as leader from outside of Parliament, where she was represented by a separate Parliamentary Leader - first Sandra Botha, and then later Athol Trollip, Lindiwe Mazibuko and Mmusi Maimane.

=== Parliamentary Leaders ===
Parliamentary leaders of the Democratic Alliance and its predecessor parties, in the absence of a sitting party leader in Parliament:

		On behalf of	Entered office	Left office	Party name
1	Helen Suzman	Jan Steytler, Harry Lawrence and Colin Eglin	October 1961	April 1974	Progressive Party
2	Sandra Botha	Helen Zille	May 2007	April 2008	Democratic Alliance
3	Athol Trollip	Helen Zille	May 2008	October 2011	Democratic Alliance
4	Lindiwe Mazibuko	Helen Zille	October 2011	May 2014	Democratic Alliance
5	Mmusi Maimane	Helen Zille	May 2014	May 2015^{7}	Democratic Alliance
6	George Michalakis	Geordin Hill-Lewis	May 2026	incumbent	

- ^{7} Maimane became national leader of the DA in May 2015 while continuing to sit in parliament, thus no longer needing a separate parliamentary leader.

=== Chairpersons ===
Federal chairpersons (sometimes referred to as 'national chairpersons') and chairpersons of the party's federal council (sometimes referred to as the party's 'federal executive' or the 'national council'), since the merger of the Reform Party and the Progressive Party in 1975:

Federal (National) Chairperson	Years	Party name	Chairperson of the Federal Council
Ray Swart	1975–1977	Progressive Reform Party	Harry Schwarz
Ray Swart	1977–1979	Progressive Federal Party	Harry Schwarz
Colin Eglin	1979–1986	Progressive Federal Party	Alex Boraine
Peter Gastrow	1986–1987	Progressive Federal Party	Ken Andrew
Helen Suzman	1987–1989	Progressive Federal Party	Ken Andrew
Tian van der Merwe	1989–1991	Democratic Party	Dave Gant
Ken Andrew	1991–1997	Democratic Party	Dave Gant
Errol Moorcroft	1997–2000	Democratic Party	Douglas Gibson
Joe Seremane	2000–2010	Democratic Alliance	James Selfe
Wilmot James	2010–2015	Democratic Alliance	James Selfe
Athol Trollip	2015–2019	Democratic Alliance	James Selfe
Ivan Meyer	2019–2026	Democratic Alliance	Helen Zille
Solly Msimanga	2026–Present	Democratic Alliance	Ashor Sarupen

=== Chief Executive Officers ===
Chief executive officers of the Democratic Alliance:

		Started	Ended
1	Ryan Coetzee	November 2004	July 2009
2	Jonathan Moakes	July 2009	September 2014
3	Paul Boughey	September 2014	October 2019

== Electoral results ==
The following table shows the electoral performance of the Democratic Party and its predecessors in elections to the House of Assembly prior to 1994. These elections were restricted to white citizens.

Election	Party name	Total votes	Share of votes	Seats	Share of seats	Party Leader(s)	Notes
1961	Progressive Party	69,045	8.6%	1	0.6%	Jan Steytler	National Party (NP) victory
1966	Progressive Party	39,717	3.1%	1	0.6%	Jan Steytler	NP victory
1970	Progressive Party	51,760	3.5%	1	0.6%	Jan Steytler	NP victory
1974	Progressive Party	58,768	5.3%	7	4.1%	Colin Eglin	NP victory
1977	Progressive Federal Party	177,705	16.7%	17	10.3%	Colin Eglin	NP victory; PFP gains official opposition status from United Party
1981	Progressive Federal Party	265,297	19.4%	27	15.2%	Frederik van Zyl Slabbert	NP victory; PFP remains official opposition
1987	Progressive Federal Party	288,579	13.9%	20	11.2%	Colin Eglin	NP victory; PFP loses official opposition status to Conservative Party
1989	Democratic Party	431,444	20.0%	33	19.1%	Zach de Beer, Denis Worrall and Wynand Malan	NP victory

The following table shows electoral performance for the Democratic Party and the Democratic Alliance in elections to the National Assembly since the advent of democracy in 1994.

Election	Total votes	Share of votes	Seats	Share of seats	Party Leader	Notes
1994	338,426	1.73%	7	1.75%	Zach de Beer	ANC victory
1999	1,527,337	9.56%	38	9.50%	Tony Leon	ANC victory; DP becomes official opposition
2004	1,931,201	12.37%	50	12.50%	Tony Leon	ANC victory; DA retains official opposition status
2009	2,945,829	16.66%	67	16.75%	Helen Zille	ANC victory; DA retains official opposition status and wins Western Cape province
2014	4,091,584	22.23%	89	22.25%	Helen Zille	ANC victory; DA retains official opposition status and retains Western Cape province
2019	3,621,188	20.77%	84	21.00%	Mmusi Maimane	ANC victory; DA retains official opposition status and retains Western Cape province with a slight decrease in support
2024	3,505,735	21.81%	87	21.75%	John Steenhuisen	ANC fell short of a majority; DA became second-largest member of a grand coalition government with the ANC (Government of National Unity); DA retained its lead in Western Cape province
