= List of South African politicians =

The following is an incomplete list of South African politicians, both past and present.

== A ==
- Prince Arthur of Connaught (1883–1938); Governor-General 1920–23
- Morris Alexander (1877–1946), member of parliament
- Ken Andrew (born 1943), chairman of Democratic Party 1991–94
- Kader Asmal (1934–2011), Minister of Education 1999–2004

== B ==
- Bongani Bongo (born 1978) Minister of State Security (2017 - 2018)
- Glenn Babb (born 1943), Ambassador to Canada (1985–87), and to Italy; Nationalist Party Member of Parliament
- Sibusiso Bengu (born 1934) Minister of Education (1994–99)
- Goodwill Zwelethini kaBhekuzulu, (1948–2021) traditional King of Zulu nation 1971–2021
- Louis Botha (1862–1919), Prime Minister of South Africa, 1910–1919
- P.W. Botha (1916–2006), Prime Minister of South Africa (1978–84); State President (1984–89)
- Thozamile Botha (born 1948), ANC activist
- Mangosuthu Buthelezi (1928–2023); Inkosi of the Buthelezi tribe, 1953–2023; Chief Minister of KwaZulu "Homeland" (1976–94)
- Sydney Buxton, 1st Earl Buxton (1853–1934); Governor-General 1914–1920
- Steve Biko (1946–1977); Black Consciousness leader;
- Schalk Willem Burger (1852–1918); President of the South African Republic, (Transvaal), 1900–1902

== C ==
- The 1st Earl of Athlone (1874–1957); Governor-General 1924–30;
- Arthur Chaskalson (1931–2012); Chief Justice of South Africa, 2001–2005
- Jeremy Cronin (born 1949); Communist SACP activist

== D ==
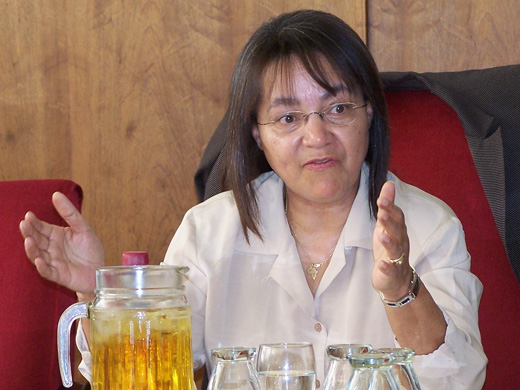
Patricia de Lille

- Zach de Beer (1928–1999), last leader of Progressive Federal Party, co-founder of Democratic Party
- F.W. de Klerk (1936–2021); last State President, 1989–94; succeeded by Nelson Mandela
- Patricia de Lille (born 1951); founder, in 2003, of Independent Democrats
- Nicolaas Jacobus de Wet (1873–1960); Governor-General 1943–46
- Nicolaas Johannes Diederichs (1903–1978); State President 1975–78
- Nkosazana Dlamini-Zuma (born 1949); Foreign Minister 1999–2009
- Patrick Duncan (1870–1943); Governor-General 1937–43;

== E ==
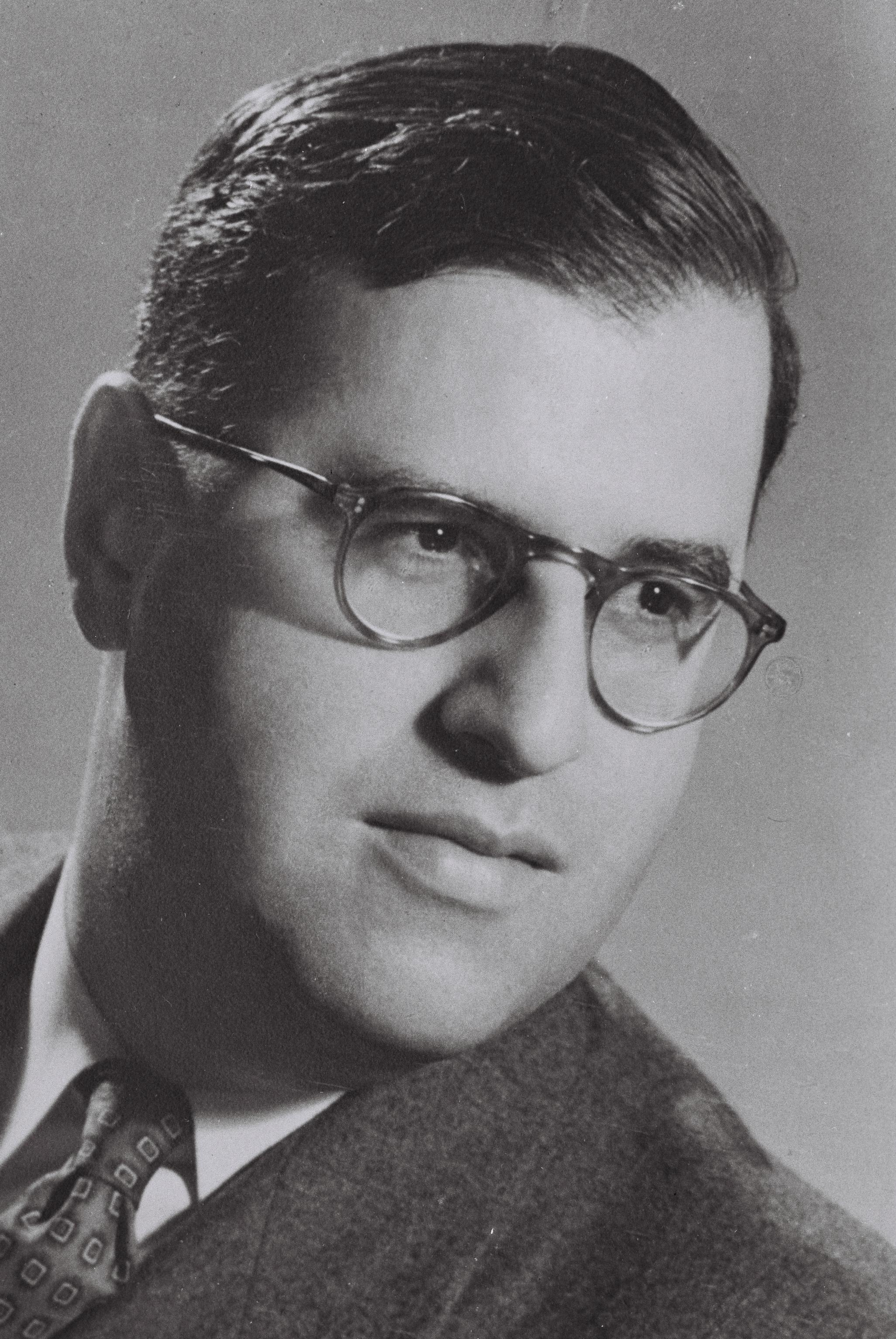
Abba Eban

- Abba Eban (1915–2002), Israeli diplomat and politician; VP of the United Nations General Assembly, and Foreign Minister of Israel
- Colin Eglin (1925–2013), leader of Progressive Party 1971–1977, Progressive Reform Party 1975–1977, and Progressive Federal Party 1977–1979 & 1986–1988

== F ==
- Jacobus Johannes Fouché (1898–1980); State President 1968–75

== G ==
- The 1st Viscount Gladstone (1854–1930); Governor-General 1910–14
- John Gunda; MP implicated in abuse of travel vouchers

== H ==
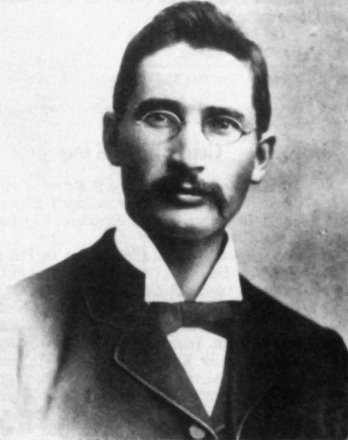
J. B. M. Hertzog

- Chris Hani (1942–1993), leader of South African Communist Party from 1991 until his assassination in 1993
- J. B. M. Hertzog (1866–1942); Prime Minister of South Africa 1924–39

== J ==
- Ernest George Jansen (1881–1959); Governor-General 1950–59;
- Danny Jordaan (born 1951), MP 1994–97, more famous for bringing 2010 World Cup to South Africa.

== K ==
- Paul Kruger (1825–1904); "Oom Paul", President of the South African Republic (Transvaal), 1883–1900
- Piet Koornhof (1925–2007), apartheid-era cabinet minister and ambassador, later a member of the African National Congress

== L ==
- Harry Lawrence (1901–1973): United Party Minister 1939–1948 and first Progressive Party chairman from 1959
- Tony Leon (born 1956); Leader of the Opposition, 1999–2007
- Albert Luthuli (1898–1967), President of the African National Congress, 1952–67

== M ==
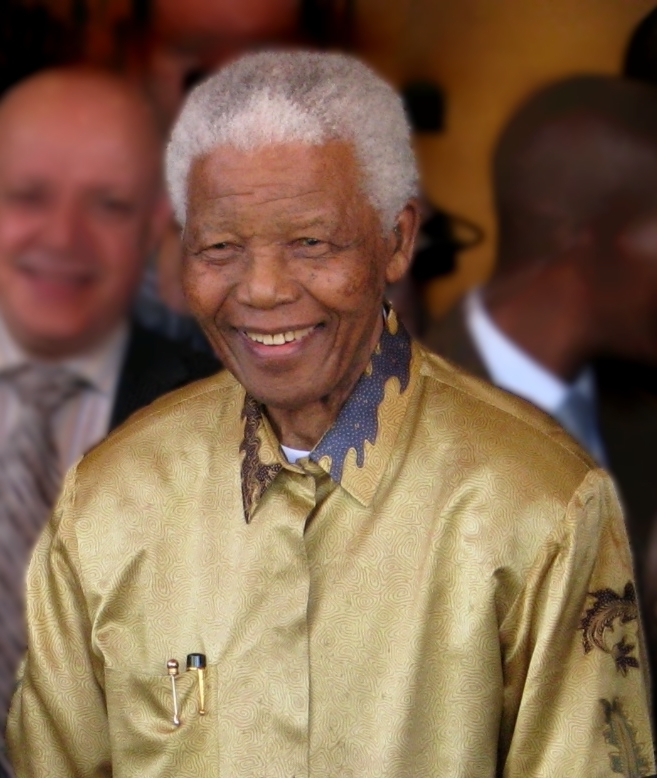
Nelson Mandela

- Daniel François Malan (1874–1959); Prime Minister of South Africa 1948–54
- General Magnus Malan (1930–2011), Chief of South African Defence Force 1976–80; Minister of Defence, 1980–91;
- Wynand Malan (born 1943); founder of National Democratic Movement and co-founder of Democratic Party
- Nelson Mandela (1918–2013); leader of Umkhonto we Sizwe 1961–90; President of South Africa 1994–99
- Trevor Manuel (born 1956); Minister of Finance, 1996–2009;
- Isaac Lesiba Maphotho (1931–2019) South African anti-apartheid activist and Umkhonto we Sizwe (MK) veteran
- Govan Mbeki (1910–2001) South African activist and father of Thabo Mbeki
- Thabo Mbeki (born 1942); President of South Africa 1999–2008;
- Frank Mdlalose (1931–2021); Premier of KwaZulu-Natal Province, 1994–97
- Raymond Mhlaba (1920–2005) South African activist and Premier of the Eastern Cape 1994–1997
- Donald Barkly Molteno (1908–1972); anti-apartheid M.P.
- James Molteno (1865–1936); First Speaker of the South African Parliament 1910–15
- Sir John Molteno (1814–1886); First Prime Minister of the Cape Colony 1872–78
- Julius Sello Malema (born 1981); former ANCYL president and Currently, – president of the Economic Freedom Fighter (EFF), most notable politician in South Africa.

== N ==
- Tom Naudé (1889–1969); Acting State President, 1967–68
- Bulelani Ngcuka (born 1954); National Director of Public Prosecutions 1998–2004
- Nokuthula Nqaba; secretary-general of the African National Congress Women's League (ANCWL)

== O ==
- Dullah Omar (1934–2004); Minister of Justice, 1994–99; Minister of Transport 1999–2004

== P ==
- Marthinus Wessel Pretorius (1819–1901); First President of the South African Republic (1857–63)

== R ==
- Cyril Ramaphosa (born 1952); Secretary General of African National Congress 1991–94; Chairman of Constitutional Assembly 1994–97
- Deneys Reitz (1882–1944); Boer Commando, soldier (World War I), Cabinet Minister, Deputy Prime Minister (1939–1943), High Commissioner to London (1944)
- Cecil John Rhodes (5 July 1853 – 26 March 1902); Prime Minister of the Cape Colony (1890 - 1896)

== S ==
- Theophilus Lyndall Schreiner (1844-1920), senator
- Harry Schwarz (1924–2010); Leader of Reform Party, leading anti-apartheid M.P. and Ambassador to United States 1991–94
- Mosima "Tokyo" Sexwale (born 5 March 1953); Premier of Gauteng province, 1994–98
- Field Marshal Jan Smuts (1870–1950); Prime Minister, 1919–24 and 1939–48
- Joe Slovo (1926–95); General Secretary of SACP 1984–91
- Saul Solomon (1817–1892); Prominent liberal member of the Cape Parliament 1854–83
- Jan Steytler (1910 – after 1977); leader of Progressive Party 1959–70
- Lucas Cornelius Steyn (1903–1976); Chief Justice 1959–76; Acting Governor-General 1959, 1961
- Johannes Gerhardus Strijdom (1893–1958); Prime Minister 1954–58
- Helen Suzman (1917–2009); anti-apartheid M.P. 1952–1981
- Charles Robberts Swart (1894–1982); Governor-General 1960–61; first State President 1961–67
- Mbhazima Shilowa (born 1958); Premier of Gauteng Province, 1999–2008

== V ==
- Jan van Riebeeck (1619–1677); first Dutch administrator of Cape Town settlement, 1652–62
- Frederik van Zyl Slabbert (born 1940); Leader of the Opposition as chairman of the Progressive Federal Party, 1979–86.
- Gideon Brand van Zyl (1873–1956); Governor-General, 1945–50
- H.F. Verwoerd (1901–1966); nicknamed "The Architect of Apartheid"; Prime Minister, 1958–66, until his assassination.
- The 6th Earl of Clarendon (1877–1955); Governor-General, 1931–37;
- Marais Viljoen (1915–2007); State President, 1979–84
- B.J. Vorster (1915–1983); Prime Minister, 1966–78; State President, 1978–79

== Z ==
- Jacob Zuma (born 1942); former President of South Africa 2007–2018
- Zille, Helen (born 1951); Mayor of Cape Town, 2006–2009; Premier of Western Cape province, 2009–present)
- Zanele KaMagwaza-Msibi (born 1962-2021) Deputy Minister Science and Technology

== See also ==
- List of South Africans
- President of South Africa
