= Queenstown (House of Assembly of South Africa constituency) =

South African constituency, 1910–1994

- Former constituency for the South African House of Assembly
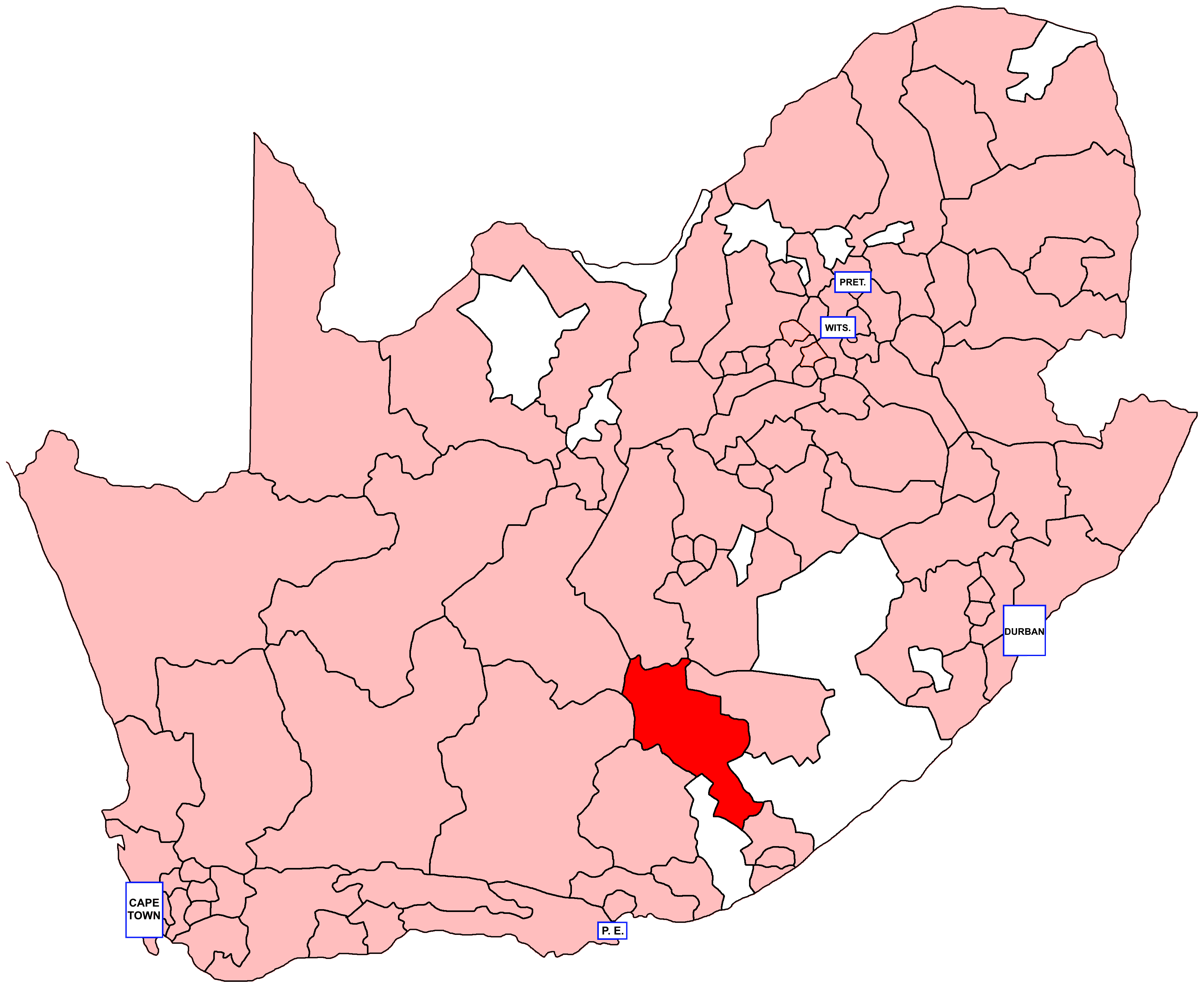
- Location of Queenstown within South Africa (1981)
- Province: Cape of Good Hope
- Electorate: 12,338 (1989)

Former constituency
- Created: 1910
- Abolished: 1994
- Number of members: 1
- Last MHA: Manie Schoeman (NP)
- Replaced by: Eastern Cape

Queenstown was a constituency in the Cape Province of South Africa, which existed from 1910 to 1994. It covered a rural area of the Eastern Cape centred on the town of Queenstown. Throughout its existence it elected one member to the House of Assembly and one to the Cape Provincial Council.

== Franchise notes ==
When the Union of South Africa was formed in 1910, the electoral qualifications in use in each pre-existing colony were kept in place. The Cape Colony had implemented a “colour-blind” franchise known as the Cape Qualified Franchise, which included all adult literate men owning more than £75 worth of property (controversially raised from £25 in 1892), and this initially remained in effect after the colony became the Cape Province. As of 1908, 22,784 out of 152,221 electors in the Cape Colony were “Native or Coloured”. Eligibility to serve in Parliament and the Provincial Council, however, was restricted to whites from 1910 onward.

The first challenge to the Cape Qualified Franchise came with the Women's Enfranchisement Act, 1930 and the Franchise Laws Amendment Act, 1931, which extended the vote to women and removed property qualifications for the white population only – non-white voters remained subject to the earlier restrictions. In 1936, the Representation of Natives Act removed all black voters from the common electoral roll and introduced three “Native Representative Members”, white MPs elected by the black voters of the province and meant to represent their interests in particular. A similar provision was made for Coloured voters with the Separate Representation of Voters Act, 1951, and although this law was challenged by the courts, it went into effect in time for the 1958 general election, which was thus held with all-white voter rolls for the first time in South African history. The all-white franchise would continue until the end of apartheid and the introduction of universal suffrage in 1994.

== History ==
The Queenstown constituency lay astride the language boundary between English- and Afrikaans-speaking white South Africans, and this meant that its politics lay somewhere in between those of the Karoo (favouring the National Party) and those of the Eastern Cape (favouring the pro-British, but not necessarily liberal, opposition). Generally, however, it tended to drift more and more into the Nationalist camp over time, switching from the United Party to the National Party in 1961 and becoming a safe seat for the NP by the 1970s. Despite efforts by the New Republic Party, which had seen minor success elsewhere in the Eastern Cape, Queenstown stuck with the governing party until the end of apartheid.

Its most notable MPs were Clifford Meyer van Coller, who served as Speaker of the House of Assembly between 1944 and 1948, Jan Steytler, who was the seat's last United Party MP before leaving to co-found the Progressive Party, and Jannie Loots, who represented Queenstown for twenty years for the NP and served in cabinet under John Vorster. Its last MP, Manie Schoeman, stayed in national politics after the end of apartheid, eventually joining the African National Congress and serving in the National Assembly until 2009.

== Members ==
| Election | Member | Party |
|---|---|---|
| 1910 | William Bisset Berry | Unionist |
| 1915 | William Bisset Berry | Unionist |
| 1920 | A. H. Frost | Unionist |
| 1921 | A. H. Frost | South African |
| 1921 by | Livingstone Moffat | South African |
| 1924 | Livingstone Moffat | South African |
| 1929 | W. F. de Wet | South African |
| 1933 | G. C. van Heerden | South African |
| 1934 by | E. W. Douglass | United |
| 1938 | Clifford Meyer van Coller | United |
| 1943 | Clifford Meyer van Coller | United |
| 1948 | Clifford Meyer van Coller | United |
| 1953 | Jan Steytler | United |
| 1958 | Jan Steytler | United |
| 1959 | Jan Steytler | Progressive |
| 1961 | Jannie Loots | National |
| 1966 | Jannie Loots | National |
| 1970 | Jannie Loots | National |
| 1974 | Jannie Loots | National |
| 1977 | Jannie Loots | National |
| 1981 | M. H. Louw | National |
| 1987 | M. H. Louw | National |
| 1989 | Manie Schoeman | National |
| 1994 | constituency abolished | |

== Detailed results ==
=== Elections in the 1910s ===
General election 1910: Queenstown
| Party | Candidate | Votes | % | ±% |
|---|---|---|---|---|
| Unionist | W. B. Berry | 1,156 | 55.1 | New |
| Independent | J. Searle | 942 | 44.9 | New |
| Majority | | 214 | 10.2 | N/A |
| Unionist win (new seat) | | | | |

General election 1915: Queenstown
| Party | Candidate | Votes | % | ±% |
|---|---|---|---|---|
| Unionist | W. B. Berry | 1,380 | 67.4 | +12.2 |
| South African | L. H. Brinkman | 668 | 32.6 | New |
| Majority | | 712 | 34.8 | N/A |
| Turnout | | 2,048 | 70.5 | N/A |
| Unionist hold | | Swing | N/A | |

=== Elections in the 1920s ===
General election 1920: Queenstown
| Party | Candidate | Votes | % | ±% |
|---|---|---|---|---|
| Unionist | A. H. Frost | 1,585 | 55.4 | −12.0 |
| National | A. J. Oelofse | 905 | 31.6 | New |
| Independent | A. Sim | 372 | 13.0 | New |
| Majority | | 680 | 23.8 | N/A |
| Turnout | | 2,862 | 75.2 | +4.7 |
| Unionist hold | | Swing | N/A | |

General election 1921: Queenstown
| Party | Candidate | Votes | % | ±% |
|---|---|---|---|---|
| South African | A. H. Frost | 1,843 | 62.5 | +7.1 |
| National | E. H. Louw | 1,105 | 37.5 | +5.9 |
| Majority | | 738 | 25.0 | +1.2 |
| Turnout | | 2,948 | 72.5 | −2.7 |
| South African hold | | Swing | +0.6 | |

Queenstown by-election, 14 December 1921
| Party | Candidate | Votes | % | ±% |
|---|---|---|---|---|
| South African | Livingstone Moffat | 1,977 | 56.8 | −5.7 |
| National | E. H. Louw | 1,461 | 42.0 | +4.5 |
| Rejected ballots | | 44 | 1.2 | N/A |
| Majority | | 516 | 14.8 | −10.2 |
| Turnout | | 3,482 | 82.8 | +10.3 |
| South African hold | | Swing | -5.1 | |

General election 1924: Queenstown
| Party | Candidate | Votes | % | ±% |
|---|---|---|---|---|
| South African | Livingstone Moffat | Unopposed | | |
| South African hold | | | | |

General election 1929: Queenstown
| Party | Candidate | Votes | % | ±% |
|---|---|---|---|---|
| South African | W. F. de Wet | 1,932 | 62.9 | N/A |
| National | T. P. N. Coetsee | 1,100 | 35.8 | New |
| Rejected ballots | | 39 | 1.3 | N/A |
| Majority | | 832 | 27.1 | N/A |
| Turnout | | 3,071 | 83.2 | N/A |
| South African hold | | Swing | N/A | |

=== Elections in the 1930s ===
General election 1933: Queenstown
| Party | Candidate | Votes | % | ±% |
|---|---|---|---|---|
| South African | G. C. van Heerden | Unopposed | | |
| South African hold | | | | |

Queenstown by-election, 12 December 1934
| Party | Candidate | Votes | % | ±% |
|---|---|---|---|---|
| United | E. W. Douglass | 2,373 | 49.1 | N/A |
| Dominion | A. Sim | 1,752 | 36.3 | New |
| Independent | T. P. N. Coetsee | 676 | 14.0 | New |
| Rejected ballots | | 32 | 0.6 | N/A |
| Majority | | 621 | 12.8 | N/A |
| Turnout | | 4,833 | 75.1 | N/A |
| United hold | | Swing | {{{swing}}} | |

General election 1938: Queenstown
| Party | Candidate | Votes | % | ±% |
|---|---|---|---|---|
| United | C. M. van Coller | 3,064 | 51.6 | N/A |
| Purified National | P. H. Malherbe | 1,654 | 27.9 | New |
| Dominion | H. Arnold | 1,192 | 20.1 | New |
| Rejected ballots | | 24 | 0.4 | N/A |
| Majority | | 1,410 | 23.8 | N/A |
| Turnout | | 5,934 | 84.9 | N/A |
| United hold | | Swing | N/A | |
