= Ray Swart =

South African politician (1928–2020)

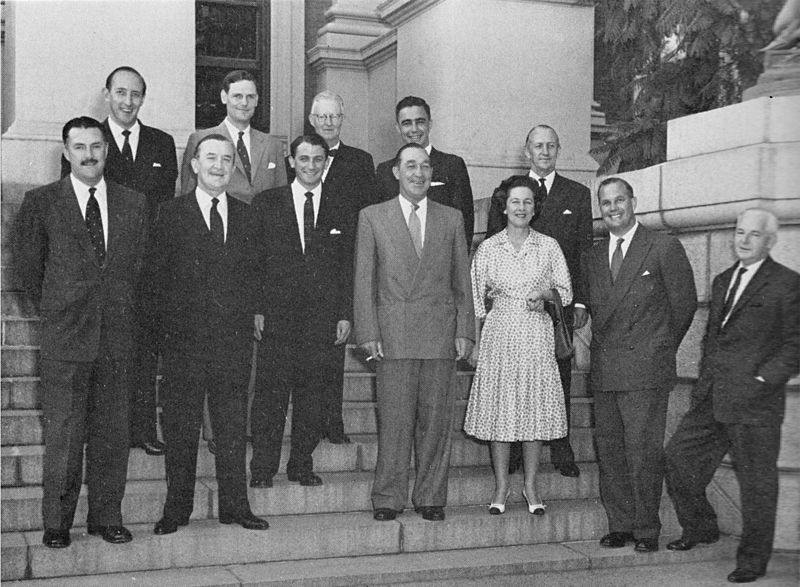
Walter Stanford, Harry Lawrence, Boris Wilson, Jan Steytler, Helen Suzman, Colin Eglin, Owen Williams, Ray Swart, Clive van Ryneveld, John Cope, Zach de Beer and Ronald Butcher in 1960.

Ray Albert Francis Swart (28 February 1928 - 14 February 2020) was a white liberal South African politician who spent his life in opposition to the apartheid policies of the government . He was educated in Durban at Glenwood High School and the University of Natal, where he graduated as a lawyer. At a very early age he became interested in politics and was initially a supporter of the United Party, for which in 1953, he was elected, at the age of 25, Member of Parliament for Zululand.

In 1959, Swart and eleven other United Party MPs left the party and founded the more liberal Progressive Party. Their policies were not well received by the conservative white electorate at the time and Swart, along with all the other Progressive MPs except Helen Suzman, lost his seat in the 1961 election. The party did not win any more seats until 1974, and Swart did not return to parliament again until the 1977 election, when he was elected MP for Musgrave in Durban. That election led to a realignment of the opposition parties and a new party, the Progressive Federal Party, replaced the United Party as the official opposition. Swart became the party chairman. He remained in Parliament until 1994, through the negotiations to end apartheid and establish majority rule.

Swart died in his sleep in Durban, aged 92. He was survived by his wife Charmian and his children Christopher, Richard, Simon, and Jeanette.
