= Zach de Beer =

South African politician (1928–1999)

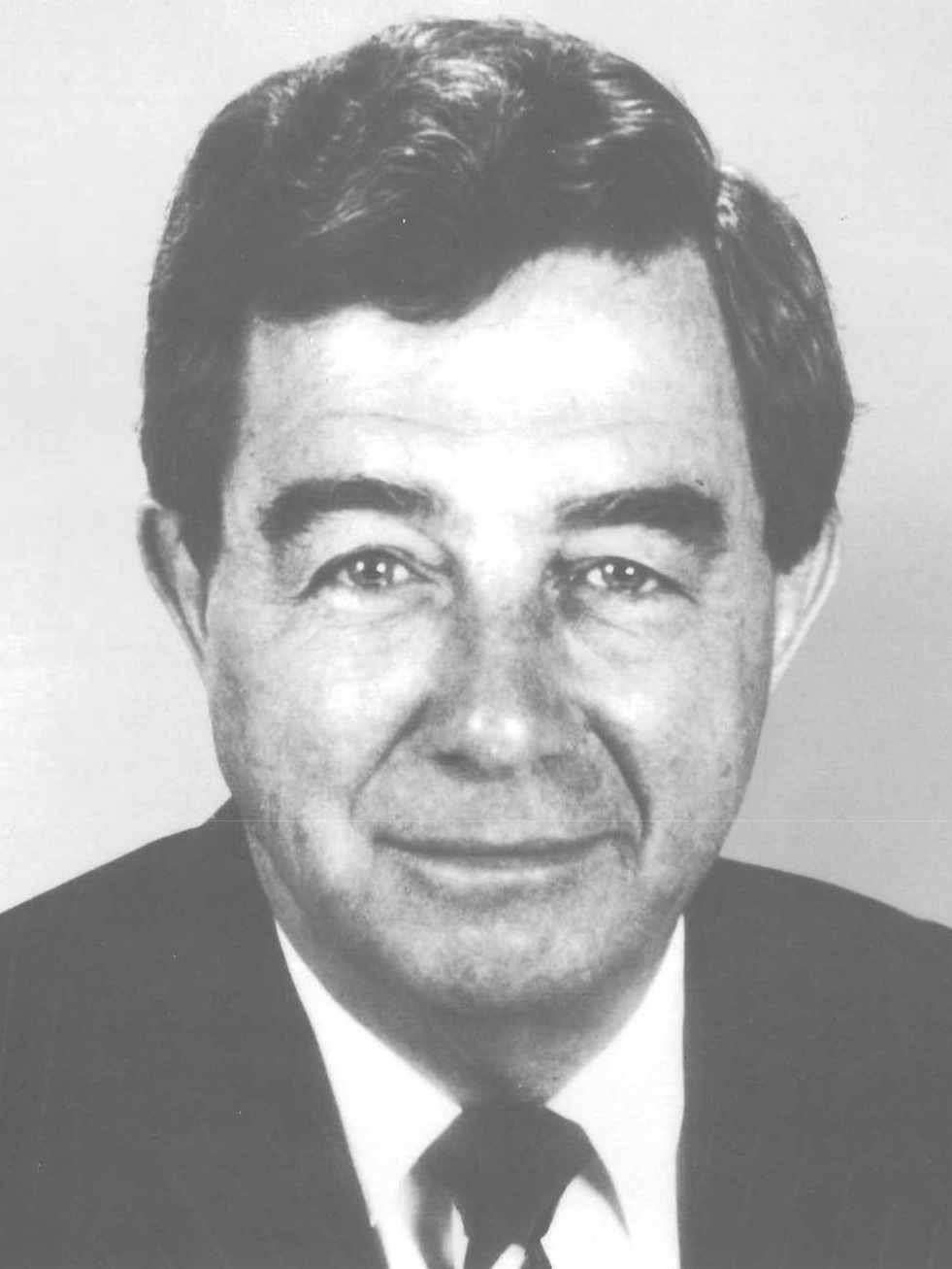
- De Beer, c. 1994

Ambassador of South Africa to the Netherlands
- In office 10 May 1994 – 27 May 1999
- President: Nelson Mandela

Federal Leader of the Democratic Party
- In office 1989–1994 Serving with Denis Worrall (until 1990); Wynand Malan (until 1993)
- Succeeded by: Tony Leon

4th Federal Leader of the Progressive Federal Party
- In office 1988–1989
- Preceded by: Colin Eglin
- Succeeded by: Office abolished

Personal details
- Born: Zacharias Johannes de Beer; 11 October 1928 Woodstock, Cape Town, Cape Province, Union of South Africa
- Died: 27 May 1999 (aged 70) Clifton, Cape Town, Western Cape, South Africa
- Citizenship: South African citizenship
- Spouse(s): Maureen Strauss (divorced) Mona Schwartz
- Children: 3
- Education: University of Cape Town
- Occupation: Politician; businessman; diplomat; activist
- Profession: Medical doctor

Zacharias Johannes de Beer (11 October 1928 – 27 May 1999) was a South African politician, businessman and diplomat. A liberal Afrikaner, he was the last federal leader of the Progressive Federal Party and then the co-federal leader of the Democratic Party.

Educated at Bishop's Diocesan College in Rondebosch, He completed an MBChB degree at the University of Cape Town in 1951. There he was elected president of the Students Representative Council.

== Political career ==
De Beer was born in Woodstock, Cape Town, the son of Jean Isobel (MacRae) and Zacharias Johannes de Beer. He was first elected to the House of Assembly in 1953 as an MP for the opposition United Party, representing the Maitland constituency. He was 24 years old at the time, and was the youngest MP ever elected to the parliament. On the party's left wing, he and fellow MPs including Helen Suzman, Colin Eglin, Ray Swart, Harry Lawrence and Dr Jan Steytler resigned from the party after its national congress voted against returning any further land to the black majority for their occupation and use. He and the other liberal MPs formed the new Progressive Party in 1959. Like all the Progressive MPs except Helen Suzman, De Beer lost his seat in the 1961 general election. He joined an advertising agency before moving on to work for the Anglo American PLC/De Beers diamond mining conglomerate.

In the 1977 general election, he was returned to Parliament as MP for Parktown, representing the Progressive Federal Party, which had been formed that year through a merger of the Progressive Party and various other liberal groups of MPs. He became the PFP's leader in August 1988 and, with Denis Worrall and Wynand Malan was a co-leader of the new Democratic Party when it formed in 1989.

Following the DP's defeat in the first post-apartheid election of 1994, De Beer resigned as party leader. He was appointed South African ambassador to the Netherlands by Nelson Mandela.

De Beer was for many years a director of Anglo American PLC/De Beers. He died of a stroke at his home in Clifton, Cape Town, in 1999.

== Bibliography ==
- Mouton, F. Alex (2022). "'Liberal crusader': Zach de Beer, apartheid and liberalism 1950–1990". Historia. 67 (1): 89–113. doi:10.17159/2309-8392/2022/v67n1a4.
- Mouton, F. Alex (2023). The Long Obedience: The Political Career of Zach de Beer, 1953–1994. Pretoria: Protea Boekhuis. ISBN 978-1-4853-1449-3.
- Gastrow, Shelagh (1992). Who's Who in South African Politics. Vol. 4. Johannesburg: Ravan Press.
- Uys, Stanley (1 June 1999). "Zach de Beer". The Guardian.
- Trewhela, Paul (2 June 1999). "Obituary: Zach de Beer". The Independent.
