= Bernard Friedman =

- Born: 1896; Pretoria, South African Republic
- Died: 1984 (aged 87–88); Johannesburg, South Africa
- Education: Pretoria Boys High School, University of Edinburgh, University of Vienna, Royal College of Surgeons
- Occupations: Surgeon, businessman, politician
- Spouse: Florence Louie Gordon
- Children: Jillian Ruth, Jonathan Gordon
- Writing career
- Pen name: Bernard Friedman
- Notable works: Smuts: A Reappraisal, George Allen & Unwin (1975)
- Notable awards: Queen's Coronation Medal, 1953

Bernard Friedman (1896 – 1984) was a South African surgeon, politician, author, and businessman who co-founded the anti-apartheid Progressive Party.

== Biography ==
=== Education, Medical Training and Role in WW2 ===
He was educated at Pretoria Boys High School and then studied medicine at the University of Edinburgh, where he was a gold medalist. He later became a specialist in aural surgery after studies in London and Vienna. Friedman practised in Johannesburg and was Honorary Surgeon to the Ear, Nose and Throat Department of Johannesburg Hospital and then Head of Department. He was senior lecturer in Otolaryngology at the Medical School of the University of Witwatersrand and consultant to the United Defence Force. In the 1920s he became a good friend of Princess Alice, Countess of Athlone, whose husband was Governor General of the Union of South Africa. The friendship lasted until Princess Alice's death. As an officer in the Medical Corps in the Second World War, he was Chief Aural Surgeon to the Military Hospital in Johannesburg.

=== Political career ===
A United Party candidate, he became an MP for Hillbrow in 1943 when Smuts was returned to power. In Parliament he was noted for the informed content of his speeches, particularly those on financial and treasury matters, and was admired by members on both sides of the House for his quick repartee and cutting interjections and "brilliant presentation" of argument in support of press freedom. Friedman kept his seat in 1948 when Jan Smuts fell from power and the Nationalist Party under D. F. Malan took over Government. Dr Friedman saw the nationalists as doomed to failure. He said "The National Party has always had its back to the wall and so it has never been able to read the writing on it".

=== Stand against Apartheid, and stand for Liberalism ===
In 1955, Friedman resigned his seat in protest against the United Party's refusal to pledge to the restoration of Coloured voters on the common roll (High Court of Parliament Bill). He defied the Party whip and challenged the failure of his leader and colleagues to oppose the apartheid government unequivocally. He stood as an Independent but was narrowly defeated by the UP candidate - from his own former party. Profoundly disappointed, he saw this as a defeat for liberal principles. When he resigned, he was already engaged in talks with those seeking a merger of the smaller opposition groups, into a non-racist opposition party. He then became one of the founders of the Progressive Party (South Africa) and was its leader in the Transvaal for 10 years. Helen Suzman was a protégé of his. C. Kaplan wrote in his obituary, "He was a man who saw the injustice of reducing the rights of South Africans of all races and was not afraid to say so".

=== Race Relations advocacy ===
He retired and became President of the South African Institute of Race Relations in which role he argued for a new constitution and bill of rights in a non-racial society. Dr Friedman wrote also on assimilation and his view was "it is a fundamental principle of every democratic state to permit within its borders a diversity of elements who are held together by a common bond of loyalty". He regretted th "Untitled Document" ere would be little future for liberalism in South Africa but saw the future as a clash between the Nationalist Party that introduced apartheid, and the Communist-dominated African National Congress.

He was also the founder and chairman of the Prudential Building Society, Chairman and Director of Unisec Ltd., Unit Securities and Trust Company of South Africa Ltd., and numerous other companies. He was befriended by Princess Alice, Countess of Athlone, when the Earl was Governor-General of South Africa. He developed the township of Northcliffe, near Johannesburg. He was also a friend of Gandhi.

=== Personal life ===
He was married to Florence Louie 'Lulu' Friedman, the satirist, translator of poetry, and publisher (Silver Leaf Books, which she founded with the writer Thelma Gutsche). Florence was the first publisher of Nobel Prize Winner, Nadine Gordimer who became her good friend, South African secretary of PEN and good friend of the writer Rebecca West. whom she and Bernard supported through her libel battle with the judge in a famous apartheid trial in 1961. It was at Dr. and Mrs. Friedman's house, "Tall Trees" in First Avenue, Lower Houghton, Johannesburg, that many anti-apartheid writers met.

Dr. Friedman was the father of the writer and expert on terrorism, Jillian Becker and a son, Jonathan Friedman, who predeceased him.

== Published works ==
- Smuts: A Reappraisal, George Allen & Unwin, London 1975, ISBN 0-04-920045-3.
- Parliament in a Caste Society, S.A. Institute of Race Relations, Johannesburg, 1976.
- From Isolation to Détente, S.A. Institute of Race Relations, Johannesburg, 1976.
