= 1970 South African general election =

- 22 April 1970

All 166 seats in the House of Assembly 84 seats needed for a majority
- Registered: 2,161,234
- Turnout: 69.76% (▲0.88pp)
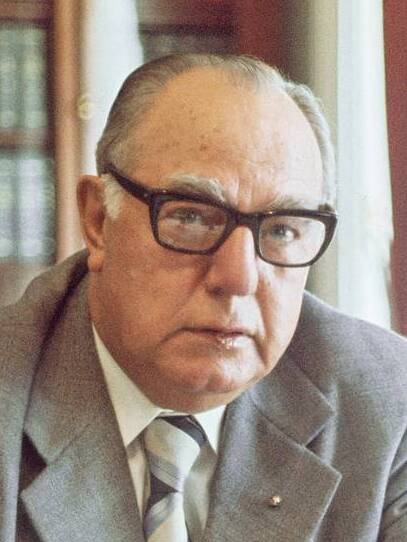

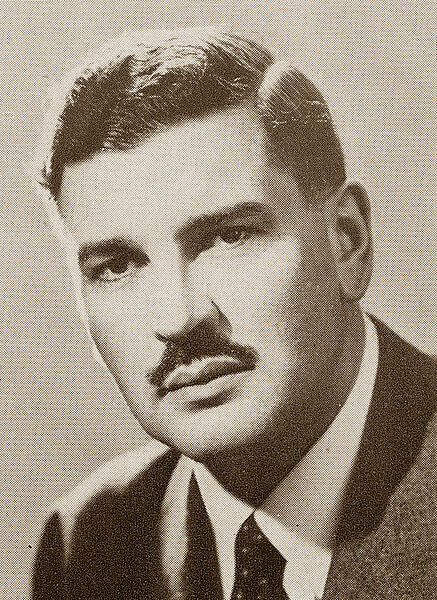

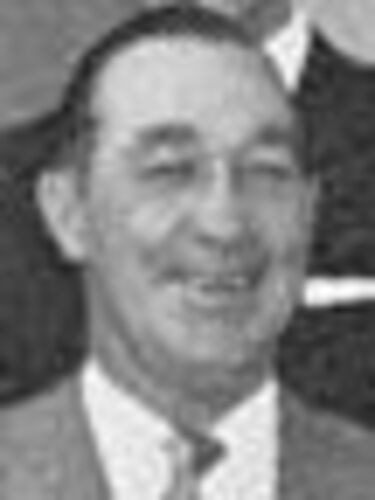
	First party	Second party	Third party
Leader	B. J. Vorster	De Villiers Graaff	Jan Steytler
Party	National	United	Progressive
Last election	58.31%, 126 seats	36.62%, 39 seats	3.05%, 1 seat
Seats won	118	47	1
Seat change	▼8	▲8	Steady
Popular vote	822,034	553,280	51,742
Percentage	54.89%	36.94%	3.45%
Swing	▼3.42pp	▲0.32pp	▲0.40pp
Prime Minister before election
B. J. Vorster
National
Elected Prime Minister
B. J. Vorster
National

External videos
- AP Archive report about the election, YouTube video

General elections were held in South Africa on 22 April 1970 to elect members of the 166-seat House of Assembly. Parliament was dissolved on 2 March and the deadline for the submission of candidates was 13 March.

The elections marked the first time since the formation of South African in 1910 that the House of Assembly would be responsible solely to White South Africans, as the seats for the four MPs elected separately by "qualified" Cape Coloured voters expired in the same year, completing the process of political apartheid. They were also the first elections after the 1969 expulsion of Albert Hertzog and many verkrampte (hardline) representatives from the ruling National Party (NP), who had subsequently formed the Herstigte Nasionale Party (HNP). This realignment marked a new chapter in the political divisions of the country, with the hardline Afrikaner right-wing later forming the Conservative Party in the early 1980s.

The elections resulted in the NP retained its large majority, reaffirming it as the dominant party for the post-Verwoerd era. Several new representatives were elected, including Chris Heunis, future Acting President and candidate for the NP leadership, and Pik Botha, future Minister of Foreign Affairs (1977–1994). However, the NP lost seats for the first time since the 1948 election, seeing its representation reduced by eight seats. With Hertzog's HNP failing to win a seat, the split in the nationalist vote benefitted the moderate United Party (UP) in several constituencies, invigorating it for perhaps the last time. Helen Suzman, member for Houghton, retained her seat in Johannesburg as the sole representative of the liberal Progressive Party, the last parliament for which she would sit for her caucus alone. Colin Eglin, who became leader of the Progressive Party in 1971, was defeated in the Cape Town seat of Sea Point by only 231 votes.

== Electoral system ==
The members of the House of Assembly were elected in single-member constituencies via first-past-the-post voting. The Senate consisted of 53 members: 41 elected by the electoral colleges (members of the Assembly and the members of the Provincial Council) of the country's four provinces (16 for the Transvaal, 11 for the Cape Province, and eight each for the Orange Free State and Natal) and eight appointed by the State President (two for each province, plus two for South West Africa).

== Results ==
=== House of Assembly ===
Eleven members were elected unopposed. Voting in one constituency did not take place, with the National Party winning the subsequent by-election to give it a total of 118 seats.

Party	Votes	%	Seats	+/–
National Party	822,034	54.89	117	–9
United Party	553,280	36.94	47	+8
Herstigte Nasionale Party	53,735	3.59	0	New
Progressive Party	51,742	3.45	1	0
United National South West Party	8,396	0.56	0	0
National Alliance Party	2,261	0.15	0	New
Independent Nationalist	1,493	0.10	0	New
Independent National Party	1,114	0.07	0	New
Democratic National Party	394	0.03	0	New
Front Party	74	0.00	0	0
Independents	3,129	0.21	0	0
Vacant			1	–
Total	1,497,652	100.00	166	–4
Valid votes	1,497,652	99.34		
Invalid/blank votes	9,982	0.66		
Total votes	1,507,634	100.00		
Registered voters/turnout	2,161,234	69.76		

== Aftermath ==
Pik Botha made his maiden speech in an unusual tone for an NP deputy, demanding that the government sign the UN Declaration of Human Rights. F. W. de Klerk was eventually elected to this parliament in a by-election to the seat for Vereeniging in September 1972, replacing NP member V. P. Coetzee.
