= 1974 South African general election =

- 24 April 1974

169 of the 171 seats in the House of Assembly 86 seats needed for a majority
- Registered: 2,232,623
- Turnout: 51.87% (▼22.48pp)
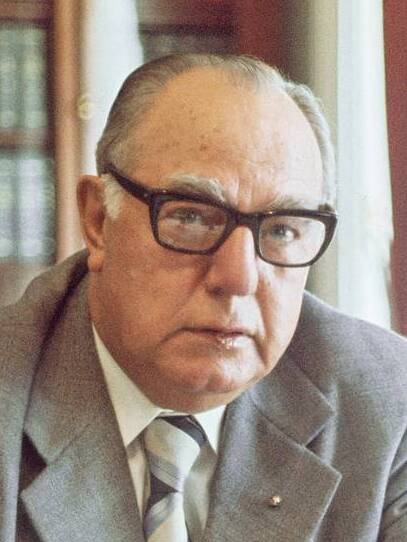

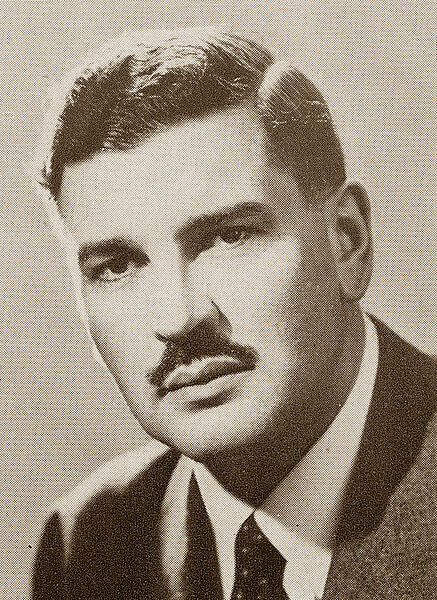

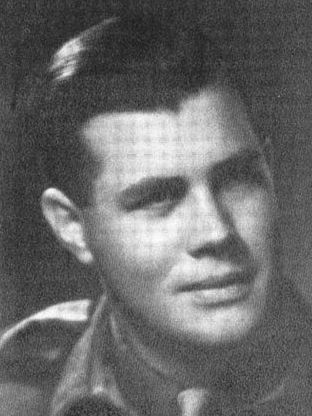
	First party	Second party	Third party
Leader	B. J. Vorster	De Villiers Graaff	Colin Eglin
Party	National	United	Progressive
Last election	54.89%, 118 seats	36.94%, 47 seats	3.43%, 1 seat
Seats won	122	41	6
Seat change	▲4	▼6	▲5
Popular vote	638,424	363,478	72,479
Percentage	56.14%	31.96%	6.37%
Swing	▲1.25pp	▼4.98pp	▲2.94pp
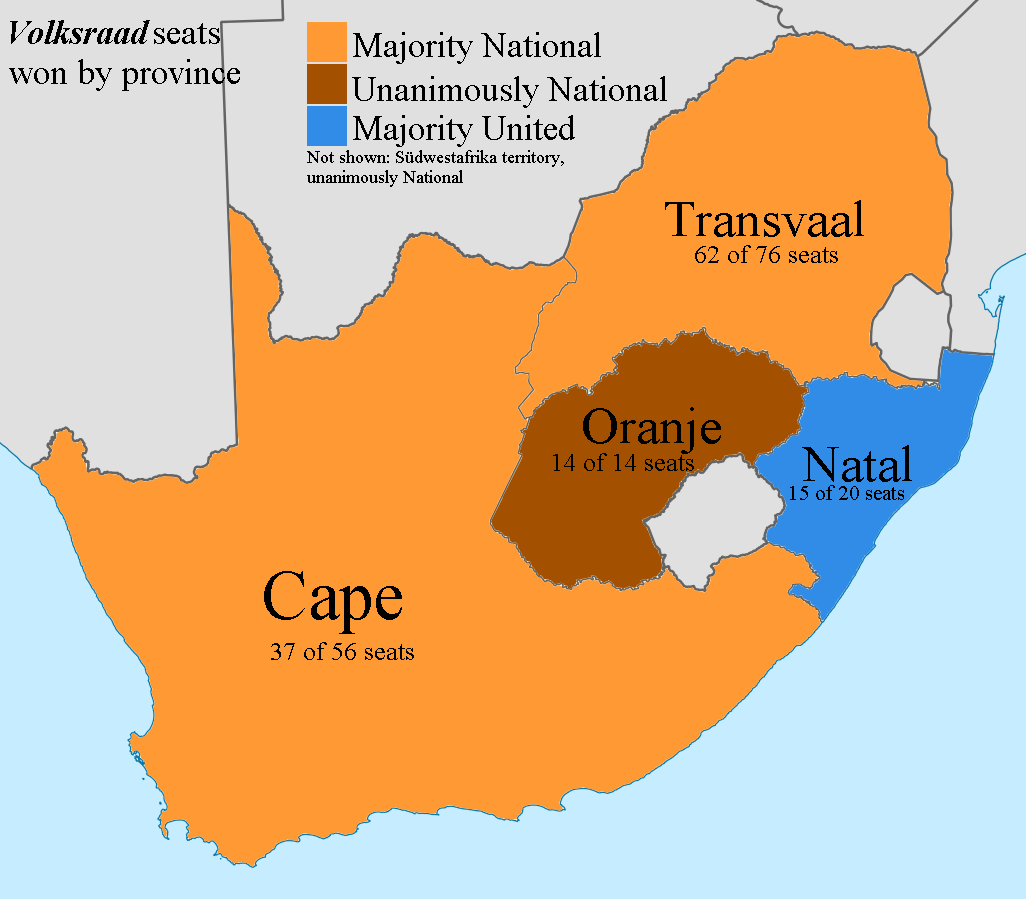
- Results by province
Prime Minister before election
John Vorster
National
Elected Prime Minister
John Vorster
National

General elections were held in South Africa on 24 April 1974. They were called one year earlier than scheduled by Prime Minister John Vorster on 4 February. The House of Assembly was increased in size from 166 to 171 members. The election was once again won by the National Party, with a slightly increased parliamentary majority.

The Progressive Party made a major advance, however. In addition to Helen Suzman, re-elected for Houghton, five other members won seats including the party leader Colin Eglin. A seventh member of the caucus was elected at a by-election soon after. The United Party won 41 seats. The election also saw Harry Schwarz, leader of the United Party in the Transvaal, enter Parliament. Schwartz would soon lead a break away from the United Party and would become one of the Apartheid's more prominent opponents in Parliament, first forming the Reform Party and then joining with the Progressive Party to form the Progressive Reform Party in 1975, under the leadership of Colin Eglin.

== Nominations ==
Nominations closed on 18 March. A total of 334 candidates were nominated for 171 seats: National Party 137, United Party 110, Herstigte Nasionale Party 46, Progressive Party 23, Democratic Party 7 and others 11. 46 seats were won unopposed, 32 for the National Party and 14 for the United Party.

== Results ==
=== House of Assembly ===
The members of the House of Assembly were elected in single-member constituencies via first-past-the-post voting. 125 of the 171 seats were contested. Voting did not take place in two constituencies, Pinelands and Wonderboom, where by-elections were later held; Pinelands was won by the Progressive Party and Wonderboom by the National Party.

Party	Votes	%	Seats	+/–
National Party	638,424	56.14	122	+4
United Party	363,478	31.96	41	–6
Progressive Party	72,479	6.37	6	+5
Herstigte Nasionale Party	44,717	3.93	0	0
Democratic Party	10,050	0.88	0	New
Others	5,471	0.48	0	0
Independents	2,532	0.22	0	0
Vacant			2	–
Total	1,137,151	100.00	171	+5
Valid votes	1,137,151	98.19		
Invalid/blank votes	20,923	1.81		
Total votes	1,158,074	100.00		
Registered voters/turnout	2,232,623	51.87		

==== By province ====
Province	National	United	Progressive	Total
Transvaal	62	11	4	76
Cape	37	15	3	56
Natal	5	15	0	20
Orange Free State	14	0	0	14
South-West Africa	5	0	0	5
Total	123	41	7	171
Source: Stadler

=== Senate ===
The elections for the Senate were held on 30 May 1974 by an electoral college made up of members of the Assembly and various others. The National Party gained one seat at the expense of the United Party, winning 32 of the 44 seats (the United Party held 12 seats).

Party	Seats	+/–
National Party	32	+1
United Party	12	–1
Total	44	0
