= Tony Leon =

South African politician (born 1956)

The Honourable Tony Leon
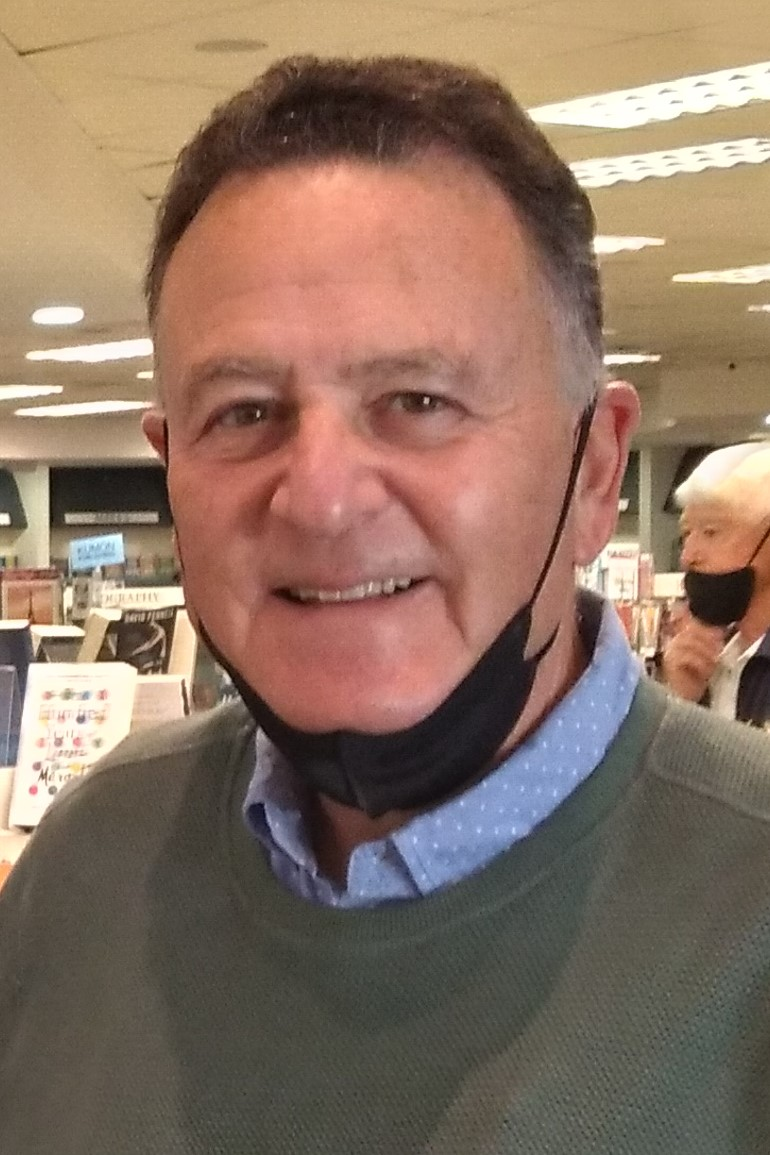
- Leon in 2021

Ambassador of South Africa to Argentina, Uruguay and Paraguay
- In office September 2009 – October 2012
- President: Jacob Zuma
- Succeeded by: Zenani Mandela-Dlamini

Leader of the Opposition
- In office June 1999 – 5 May 2007
- Preceded by: Marthinus van Schalkwyk
- Succeeded by: Sandra Botha

Federal Leader of the Democratic Alliance
- In office 24 June 2000 – 5 May 2007
- Preceded by: Position established
- Succeeded by: Helen Zille

Federal Leader of the Democratic Party
- In office April 1994 – 24 June 2000
- Preceded by: Zach de Beer
- Succeeded by: Position abolished

Member of the National Assembly of South Africa
- In office April 1994 – 2009

Member of the House of Assembly of South Africa (abolished in 1994)
- In office September 1989 – April 1994
- Constituency: Houghton

Personal details
- Born: Anthony James Leon; 15 December 1956 (age 69) Durban, Natal Province, Union of South Africa
- Party: Democratic Alliance (2000-present)
- Other political affiliations: Democratic Party (1989-2000); Progressive Federal Party (1977-1989); Progressive Reform Party (1975-1977); Progressive Party (1974-1975)
- Spouse(s): Michal Leon (nee Levanon. Previous married name: Even-Zahav) (m. 2000)
- Children: 2
- Education: University of Witwatersrand
- Occupation: Politician; diplomat; businessman; columnist; activist
- Profession: Lawyer
- Website: www.tonyleon.com

Anthony James Leon (born 15 December 1956) is a South African politician who served as leader of the opposition from 1999 to 2007 as leader of the Democratic Alliance (DA). He led the DA from its inception in 2000, until his retirement from leadership in 2007. Before that, he led the Democratic Party from 1994. He is the longest-serving leader of the official opposition in parliament since the advent of democracy in 1994. Although still a member of the DA, he served as the South African Ambassador to Argentina, Uruguay and Paraguay under the African National Congress government from 2009 to 2012.

His career post-politics has included multiple contracts as an opinions columnist, he is the author of six books, and he also founded Resolve Communications, a public relations company.

== Early life ==
Leon was born and raised in Durban during the apartheid era. He was educated at Clifton School (Durban) and Kearsney College near Durban. His father, Ramon Leon, was a High Court Judge. Both his parents were active in the liberal, anti-apartheid Progressive Party (which later became the Democratic Party). He is Jewish and had his Bar Mitzvah at the Great Synagogue in Durban, where he also attended High Holiday services with his family.

== Political career ==
In 1974 at the age of 18, he became an organiser for the Progressive Party, one of the two opposition parties represented in parliament at the time. After this, he qualified as an attorney at the University of the Witwatersrand, where he was President of the Law Students' Council and vice-president of the Students' Representative Council, and became a lecturer in the Law Department in 1986. He has credited Harry Schwarz and Helen Suzman as his biggest inspirations. In the same year he was elected to the Johannesburg City Council for Yeoville. When the results for the election were released, it was announced that the National Party candidate Sam Bloomberg had won. However, Harry Schwarz, his political mentor, uncovered that this was untrue, and Leon was declared the winner. He became the leader of the opposition in the city council.

In 1989 he was elected to Parliament for the Houghton constituency, representing the Progressive Party's successor, the Democratic Party.

From 1990 to 1994 he chaired the DP's Bill of Rights Commission, and as such was an advisor to the Convention for a Democratic South Africa (CODESA) and a delegate to the multi-party negotiations that led to the end of apartheid and the establishment of a non-racial democracy in 1994.

At the 1994 general elections, Leon was again elected to Parliament in the first democratic National Assembly, as well as leader of the Democratic Party. At the time, the Democratic Party was perceived as merely a minor party of white liberals, an oddity in the first non-racial democratic government of South Africa. Yet between 1994 and 1999 its seven members managed to become the most vocal, active and involved legislators.

In 1998, Leon published his first book on the eve of the second democratic election, entitled Hope & Fear: Reflections of a Democrat (Jonathan Ball, 1998). With the second democratic elections in 1999 and the New National Party only retaining 28 seats (down from 82 in 1994), he became Leader of the Opposition as the DP took 38 seats, showing a growth of over five-fold.

After the 2004 general elections, the DA under Leon had a vote increase of 2.8%, as did the African National Congress (ANC) with an increase of 3.3%. These gains came at a cost to three of the five minor opposition parties, with only the Independent Democrats – a newcomer in the elections – also attracting support.

Leon built a high media profile as an opposition leader by criticising the ANC government under Nelson Mandela but more so under his successor, President Thabo Mbeki.

During the administration of Cyril Ramaphosa, Tony Leon criticized South Africa’s foreign policy, particularly its relations with Iran and its alignment with Hamas, describing this position as indicative of “moral blindness. He also contended that “South Africa’s alignment with Hamas and regimes like Iran undermines the very human rights and democratic principles we claim to uphold.”

== Post politics ==
On 26 November 2006, Leon announced that he would step down from the leadership of the DA in 2007, and would not accept nomination for the leadership of the party. He officially stepped down at the May 2007 conference, and Helen Zille was elected to be the new party leader. Leon, nevertheless, kept his seat in Parliament until 2009, when its term expired.

Leon was voted 16th in the TV channel SABC3's Top 100 Great South Africans.

From September to December 2007, Leon was a Fellow at the Institute of Politics at Harvard's John F. Kennedy School of Government.

In 2008, Leon released his autobiography On the Contrary. The book was favourably received, The Economist describing it as "eloquent, funny and rich... an important record of South Africa's young democracy, witnessed from the other side of the fence". The book was also serialized by the Johannesburg Sunday Times. The book won the Recht Malan Prize in the Via Afrika Book Awards for the best work of non-fiction in 2009.

In 2008, Leon was a visiting fellow at the Cato Institute Center for Liberty and Global Prosperity in Washington DC. His research paper: "The State of Liberal Democracy in Africa - Resurgence or Recession" was published in May 2010.

Leon published a series of articles in Business Day from the campaign trail of the 2009 South African general election.

Between 2012 and 2024, Leon has been a contracted columnist to Arena Holdings Ltd with his columns appearing weekly or monthly in Business Day, Sunday Times, and the Business Live, respectively.

In 2013, upon returning to South Africa, he started a business, Resolve Communications. He is the executive chairman.

Since 2024, he has started writing columns for News 24.

== South African ambassadorship and return to South Africa ==
In August 2009, President Zuma appointed Leon as Ambassador to Argentina, Uruguay and Paraguay. After receiving diplomatic training, Leon took up his post in September. Leon followed many DA and Democratic Party members who became ambassadors, such as Harry Schwarz, Zach de Beer, Douglas Gibson and Sandra Botha.

On his return in January 2013, he was awarded a fellowship at the Stellenbosch Institute for Advanced Study (STIAS). He wrote a paper entitled "Where in the World is South Africa?", which was subsequently published in the South African Journal of International Affairs, 2013, Vol.20.

== Books ==
Leon published a memoir of his ambassadorial life titled The Accidental Ambassador: From Parliament to Patagonia (Pan MacMillan, 2013). The book received critical acclaim from Business Day, where it was said to be "fascinating... Leon is an excellent writer and recounter... eloquent and heartwarming." (Sue Grant-Marshall). The Cape Times described the book as "intelligent, engaging and incredibly funny" (Shaun Swingler).

Shortly after former President Nelson Mandela's death in December 2013, Leon published another book, this time concerning Mandela's presidency and leadership from the perspective of the parliamentary opposition. Opposite Mandela: Encounters with South Africa's Icon was published in May 2014 by Jonathan Ball Publishers. Sue Grant-Marshall in Business Day wrote: "It is no surprise that in the year after Mandela's death a cascade of books by those who know the international icon are flooding the shops and bookshelves. Leave space for this one - it's written from Leon's particular perspective as Mandela's political opponent. It does not disappoint in this, his fourth book, for he tells fascinating tales with characteristic frankness and vigour."

In March 2021, Jonathan Ball Publishers released Leon's fifth book: Future Tense - Reflections on My Troubled Land. Drawing from his vantage points of years in active politics and his subsequent career as an opinion writer and columnist, this book captures and analyses recent South African history, with a focus on corruption within the government. It also provides an insider view, for the first time, of the power struggles within the Democratic Alliance and plots the country's likely future trajectory. The book was favourably reviewed by Niall Ferguson.

In April 2025, Jonathan Ball Publishers released Leon's sixth book, Being There - Backstories from the Political Front. The book has been widely praised for shedding light on lesser-known stories, including Leon's behind-the-scenes experiences as part of the Democratic Alliance's negotiation team during the historic formation of the new coalition government (GNU).

== Personal life ==
In 2000, Leon married Michal (formerly Even-Zahav) from Israel, the mother of his two stepchildren, Noa and Etai Even-Zahav. Leon lives in Cape Town.

Political offices
Preceded by Marthinus van Schalkwyk	Leader of the Opposition in the National Assembly; 1997–2007	Succeeded by Sandra Botha
Party political offices
Preceded by Zach de Beer	Leader of the Democratic Party; 1994–2000	Succeeded by himself as Leader of the Democratic Alliance
Preceded by himself as Leader of the Democratic Party	Leader of the Democratic Alliance; 2000–2007	Succeeded by Helen Zille
