= Reform Party (South Africa) =

Reform Party Reformiste Party (Afrikaans)
- Leader: Harry Schwarz
- Founded: 11 February 1975
- Dissolved: 25 July 1975 (merged with Progressive Party)
- Preceded by: United Party
- Merged into: Progressive Reform Party
- Ideology: Liberalism; Anti-apartheid

The Reform Party (Afrikaans: Reformiste Party) was an anti-apartheid political party that existed for just five months in 1975 and is one of the predecessor parties to the Democratic Alliance. The Reform Party was created on 11 February by a group of four Members of Parliament (MPs) who left the United Party under the guidance of the leader of the United Party in the Transvaal, Harry Schwarz, who became the party's leader. Schwarz and others were staunchly opposed to apartheid and called for a much more rigorous opposition to the National Party. They said that they no longer felt the UP was "the vehicle in which we can travel the path of verligtheid". The party had four MPs, two senators, ten members of the Transvaal Provincial Council, 14 out of the 36 Johannesburg City Councillors and four Randburg City Councillors. This made it the official opposition in the Transvaal Provincial Council.

== Formation ==
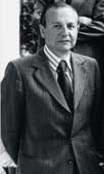
Harry Schwarz, leader of the Reform Party.

There was much division in the United party, between liberals and conservatives in the 1960s and early 1970s. Divisions came to a head in 1972 when Harry Schwarz, leader of the liberal "Young Turks" within the party, wrestled the leadership of the party in the Transvaal from Marais Steyn. His victory was a visible sign of strength from the liberals within the party. In 1975 Harry Schwarz broke away from the party with four other MPs, two senators, ten members of the Transvaal Provincial Council, 14 out of the 36 Johannesburg City Councillors, four Randburg City Councillors formed the Reform Party.

At the Reform Party's first meeting it mapped out the party's objectives. Among the main ones were:

1. The Reform Party believes in equality of opportunity and must create the conditions in which equality of opportunity can be exercised.

2. The Reform Party stands for the removal of discrimination based on colour. It must get together with the people of other races to evolve a way in which discrimination will be removed.

== Merger with Progressive Party ==
Although closer to the Progressives' agenda, the new Reform Party made no immediate move to merge the two parties. Eventually the party merged with the Progressive Party on 25 July 1975 to form the Progressive Reform Party with Colin Eglin as the new leader and Schwarz as Chairman of the National Executive. This proved to realign the opposition in South Africa, as the PRP became the official opposition party following the demise of the UP. In 1977 another group of United Party members left the Party to form the Committee for a United Opposition, which then joined the Progressive Reform Party to form the Progressive Federal Party.

== See also ==
- Liberalism in South Africa
