= Ken Andrew =

South African politician

Federal chairman of the Democratic Party
- In office 1991–1994

Personal details
- Born: 30 May 1943 (age 83)
- Party: Democratic Party
- Spouse: Adrianne
- Children: two
- Education: Rondebosch Boys' High School
- Alma mater: University of Cape Town

Kenneth Michael Andrew (born 30 May 1943) is a South African politician. He was born in Cape Town and matriculated from Rondebosch Boys' High School as head boy. Andrew studied at the University of Cape Town where he achieved his BSc degree and later a Masters in business administration. He is married to Adrianne and has two children.

== Political career ==
While still at the University of Cape Town he chaired the local committee of the National Union of South African Students. Later in 1961 he joined the Progressive Party which was succeeded by the Progressive Federal Party in 1978. The party was later changed to the Democratic Party where he became its federal chairman from 1991 to 1994.

He served in the post-apartheid Parliament, latterly under the banner of the Democratic Alliance, until after the 2004 general election, when he retired.
