= Jan Steytler =

South African politician

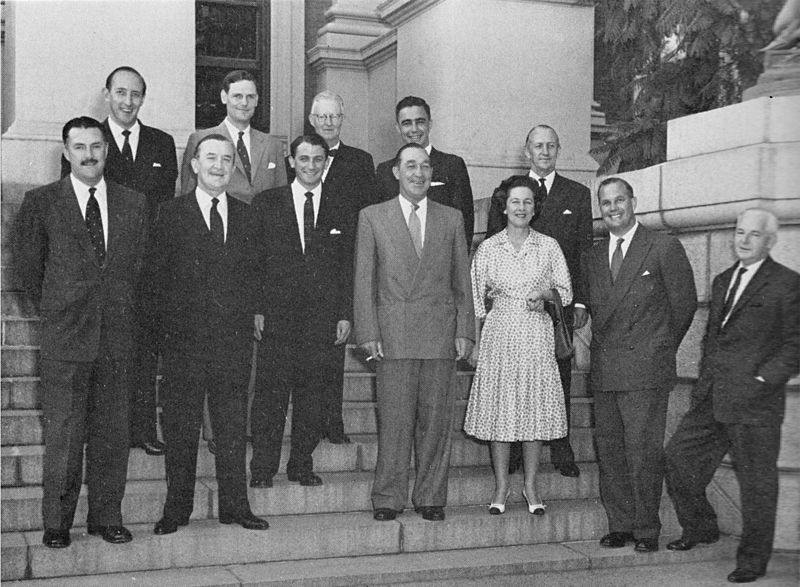
- Walter Stanford, Harry Lawrence, Boris Wilson, Jan Steytler, Helen Suzman, Colin Eglin, Owen Williams, Ray Swart, Clive van Ryneveld, John Cope, Zach de Beer and Ronald Butcher in 1960

Leader of the Progressive Party
- In office 1959–1971
- Preceded by: Office established
- Succeeded by: Colin Eglin

Member of Parliament for Queenstown
- In office 1953–1961
- Constituency: Queenstown, Cape Province
- In office 1959–1961
- Constituency: Queenstown, Cape Province

Personal details
- Born: October 26, 1910 Burgersdorp, Cape Province, Union of South Africa
- Died: Unknown
- Party: United Party; Progressive Party

Johannes "Jan" van Aswegen Steytler (October 26, 1910 – October 25, 1990) was a liberal South African politician and the first leader of the Progressive Party (PP). He was born in Burgersdorp, in the then Cape Province now Eastern Cape Province.

== Background ==
Steytler was an Afrikaner. He was born on October 26, 1910, in Burghersdorp. His father Louw Steytler was a veteran of the Second Boer War, who had helped found the National Party (NP). Louw Steytler became a Member of Parliament, as a supporter of J. B. M. Hertzog, who led the NP and then the United Party (UP) after the fusion of 1934. When the UP split in 1939, the Steytler family broke with Hertzog to remain in the UP as supporters of Jan Smuts. Louw Steytler died in 1945.

Jan Steytler went to England, in the 1930s, to study medicine at Guy's Hospital, London. As a student and later a member of staff, Steytler played first class Rugby Union for his hospital and was mentioned as a possible England player.

On the outbreak of the Second World War, Steytler returned to South Africa to become a member of the Medical Corps of the Union Defence Force. After the war he became a District Surgeon in the Cape town of Beaufort West, where he became active in politics.

== Political career ==
Steytler contested Beaufort West in the 1948 South African general election, as a UP candidate. Although he had no chance of election, in a strongly NP area, he was seen as a vigorous and attractive candidate. The following year he contested a by-election in another hopeless seat (De Aar-Colesberg), before being offered the UP candidacy in the safe UP seat of Queenstown.

Steytler was elected a member of Parliament in the 1953 South African general election. His comparatively liberal views were not welcomed by some UP leaders. However, when boundary changes made Queenstown marginal, Steytler won the seat by a majority of 13 in the 1958 South African general election. As a result of his increased prominence Steytler became the leader of the UP in Cape Province and tried to persuade his party to take a more liberal direction on racial issues.

After failing to prevail within the UP leadership, Steytler became the leading figure in a group of progressives which eventually broke away to found a new party. Steytler resigned from the UP on 17 August 1959 and was named as the first leader of the Progressive Party, when it was founded on 13 November 1959.

Steytler was a powerful personality and a compelling orator, but like all Progressive MPs with the sole exception of Helen Suzman, he lost his seat in the South African parliament in the 1961 general election. Steytler remained party leader until he retired from the post in December 1970.

== Personal life ==
He married Mary Elaine Parker in 1941. They had two daughters and two sons.
