= Harry Lawrence =

South African politician

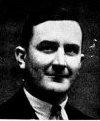

Ministers of the Interior
- In office 6 Sep 1939 – 16 Aug 1943
- Prime Minister: Jan Smuts
- Preceded by: Richard Stuttaford
- Succeeded by: Charles Francis Clarkson

Ministers of the Interior
- In office 16 Jan 1948 – 4 Jun 1948
- Prime Minister: Jan Smuts
- Preceded by: Charles Francis Clarkson
- Succeeded by: Eben Dönges

Ministers of Justice
- In office 1945 – Jun 1948
- Prime Minister: Jan Smuts
- Preceded by: Colin Fraser Steyn
- Succeeded by: Charles Robberts Swart

Personal details
- Born: 1901
- Died: 1973 (aged 71–72)
- Party: United Party; Progressive Party

Harry Gordon Lawrence (1901–1973) was a South African politician.

Harry Lawrence was on the liberal wing of the United Party. He was the most senior of the MPs who broke away and founded the Progressive Party in 1959.

Lawrence served as a minister in the government of Jan Smuts before the National Party came to power in 1948.

He was Minister of Home Affairs 1939–43 and January–June 1948, as well as Minister of Justice 1945-June 1948.

Lawrence had his spleen damaged when he was attacked by Nationalists at a political meeting during the Second World War. This injury caused Lawrence continuous pain, as he explained when he declined to be considered for the Progressive Party leadership in 1959. He did, however, become the first party chairman of the PP.

Lawrence, like all the Progressive MPs except Helen Suzman was not re-elected at the 1961 General Election. He did not return to Parliament but served as temporary Party leader after Jan Steytler resigned in December 1970, until Colin Eglin was elected leader in February 1971.
