= Progressive Reform Party (South Africa) =

Progressive Reform Party Progressiewe Reformiste Party (Afrikaans)
- Leader: Colin Eglin
- Chairman: Harry Schwarz
- Founded: 25 July 1975
- Dissolved: 1977 (merged with Committee for a United Opposition)
- Preceded by: Reform Party and Progressive Party
- Merged into: Progressive Federal Party
- Ideology: Liberalism; Anti-apartheid

The Progressive Reform Party (PRP) (Afrikaans: Progressiewe Reformiste Party) was a South African party that was formed on 26 July 1975 by the fusion of the Reform Party led by Harry Schwarz and the Progressive Party led by Colin Eglin. Harry Schwarz predicted that the merger would lead to a "new political dimension in South Africa."

Colin Eglin was elected leader of the party while Harry Schwarz was made Chairman of the Federal Executive.

In 1977, the United Party merged with another small party to form the New Republic Party. A number of United Party members left to form the Committee for a United Opposition, which then joined the Progressive Reform Party to form the Progressive Federal Party with Colin Eglin as its leader.
