= Colin Eglin =

South African politician (1925–2013)

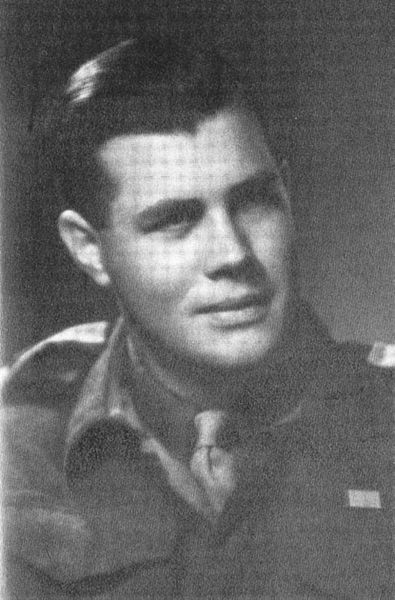
- Eglin during World War II

Leader of the Progressive Federal Party
- In office 1977–1979
- Preceded by: Office established
- Succeeded by: Frederik van Zyl Slabbert
- In office 1986–1988
- Preceded by: Frederik van Zyl Slabbert
- Succeeded by: Zach de Beer

Leader of the Progressive Reform Party
- In office 1975–1977
- Preceded by: Office established
- Succeeded by: Office abolished

Leader of the Progressive Party
- In office 1971–1975
- Preceded by: Jan Steytler
- Succeeded by: Office abolished

Personal details
- Born: 14 April 1925 Sea Point, Cape Town, Cape Province, Union of South Africa
- Died: 29 November 2013 (aged 88) Cape Town, Western Cape, South Africa
- Citizenship: South African
- Party: Democratic Alliance (2000–2013)
- Other political affiliations: Democratic Party (1989–2000); Progressive Federal Party (1977–1989); Progressive Reform Party (1975–1977); Progressive Party (1959–1975); United Party (before 1959)
- Education: University of Cape Town

Military service
- Allegiance: Union of South Africa
- Branch/service: South African Defence Forces
- Years of service: 1943–1946
- Battles/wars: World War II

Colin Wells Eglin (14 April 1925 – 29 November 2013) was a South African politician best known for having served as national leader of the opposition from 1977–1979 and 1986–87. He represented Sea Point in the South African Parliament from 1958–1961 and from 1974–2004. Described by Nelson Mandela as "one of the architects of [South Africa's] democracy", Eglin played a leading role in the drafting of the country's post-apartheid constitution.

== Early life, education and military service ==
Eglin was born in on 14 April 1925 in Sea Point, Cape Town, the son of Carl August Eglin and his wife, Elsie May Wells, both being South Africans of British descent. Eglin spent the early part of his life growing up in the neighbourhood of Pinelands. He had just turned nine when his father died in July 1934. He later wrote, "He had been ill for a long time, but had been strengthened by a deep and abiding Christian faith - and by the love and care (and equally deep faith) of his wife". His mother died in 1958.

Following his father's death the Eglin family moved in with his aunt in Hobhouse in the Free State, attending Hobhouse School where he was the only English–speaking learner. He then moved to the town Villiersdorp to continue his schooling at the De Villiers Graaff High School where he matriculated in 1939. The following year he enrolled at the University of Cape Town to pursue his undergraduate studies in quantity surveying.

He interrupted his studies in 1943 during World War II to join the South African Army. He became a full-time instructor in the anti-aircraft unit in Cape Town. He was then sent to a similar unit in the Kingdom of Egypt and transferred to Italy. He took part in the South African assault on Monte Sole, after which the Allies broke through to the plains of Italy. After the War he remained in Italy for nine months, waiting for demobilisation. During this period, he undertook extramural courses in archaeology and town planning.

He graduated from the University of Cape Town with a BSc degree in quantity surveying in 1946.

== Early political activity ==
Eglin was a member of Pinelands Municipal Council from 1951 to 1954. He was elected as a United Party Cape Province Provincial Councillor in 1954 and served until 1958. He was elected unopposed as MP for the Pinelands constituency in 1958. He left the United Party to become a founder member of the Progressive Party in 1959, losing his seat in the 1961 general election.

Eglin became the leader of the Progressive Party in February 1971. Eglin was at first outside Parliament, but he was elected for the Cape Town seat of Sea Point in the April 1974 General Election, when five other PP candidates joined Helen Suzman in Parliament.

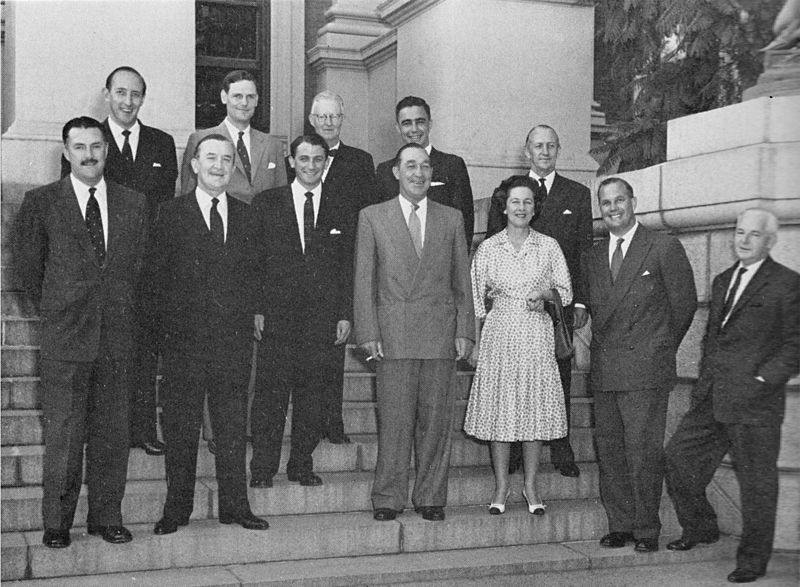
Eglin to the right of Helen Suzman in 1960

== Mounting parliamentary opposition to apartheid ==
In February 1975, UP liberal leader Harry Schwarz was expelled from the party along with several others, who formed the Reform Party. The two parties, which shared an anti-apartheid ideology, entered into negotiations to merge, which resulted in the creation of the Progressive Reform Party in July 1975. Eglin was elected leader after Schwarz agreed not to stand for the leadership and was appointed Chairman of the National Executive. He became leader of the Progressive Federal Party in 1977, following a merger with the Committee for United Opposition that had also broken away from the United Party. Eglin was the leader of the official Opposition 1977-79. He was replaced as leader by Frederik van Zyl Slabbert in 1979, when Eglin became Shadow Foreign Minister, a post he would hold until 1986.

From 1986 to 1988, Eglin was again party leader, following the resignation of Slabbert. He was official Opposition leader until 1987, when the right-wing Conservative Party became the official opposition party. Zach de Beer took over as leader of the Progressive Federal Party in 1988. The party merged with other groups to become the Democratic Party in 1989 and then the Democratic Alliance in 2000.

Eglin continued to serve in the segregated House of Assembly until it was abolished in 1994 and then in the multi-racial National Assembly in the Parliament of South Africa until he retired in 2004.

== Honours ==
Colin Eglin was made an Officer of the Order of the Disa in 2005. He was awarded the Order of the Baobab, Category II (Silver), in April 2013.

== Death ==
Eglin died on 29 November 2013 due to cardiac arrest at the age of 88.

== Autobiography ==
He wrote an autobiography titled Crossing the Borders of Power (2007). Jonathan Ball Publishers SA, ISBN 1868422534, 978-1868422531.

== Sources ==
- The International Who's Who 2006 (Routledge 2006)
- UCT News, Alumni Magazine, 2007
