= Progressive Party (South Africa) =

Defunct political party in apartheid-era South Africa

Progressive Party Progressiewe Party (Afrikaans)
- Leader: Colin Eglin
- Founded: 1959; 67 years ago
- Dissolved: 1975; 51 years ago
- Split from: United Party
- Merged into: Progressive Reform Party
- Ideology: Liberalism; Anti-apartheid
- Political position: Centre-left

The Progressive Party (PP) (Afrikaans: Progressiewe Party) was a liberal party in South Africa which, during the era of apartheid, was considered the left-wing of the all-white parliament. The party represented the legal opposition to apartheid within South Africa's white minority. It opposed the ruling National Party's racial policies, and championed the rule of law.

For 13 years, its only member of parliament was Helen Suzman. It was later renamed the Progressive Reform Party in 1975, and then Progressive Federal Party in 1977. The modern Democratic Alliance considers the party to be its earliest predecessor.

The Progressive Party of South Africa is not to be confused with the much earlier Progressive Party of the Cape Colony, which was founded on very different, pro-imperialist policies and which became the "Union Party" in 1908.

== Creation ==
The Progressive Party was formed by members who had left the United Party following the United Party Union Congress held in Bloemfontein starting on 11 August 1959. The delegates at the Party Congress passed policy resolutions limiting the political rights the party wished to give to Natives. The Progressives found these resolutions unacceptable.

Dissatisfied with the supine stance of the United Party to the apartheid policies of the Government, twelve liberal members of the United Party broke away to form the Progressive Party in 1959. The party rejected race discrimination and advocated equal opportunities for all with a qualified franchise with a common voter's roll.

A Progressive Group of MPs led by Dr Bernard Friedman, organized the new party. The first meeting of the Group took place at the home of Helen Suzman, MP for the Transvaal seat of Houghton. This meeting took place on 23–24 August 1959. The Progressive Party began its founding Congress on 13 November 1959, in Johannesburg.

Jan Steytler, a former Cape leader of the United Party, was elected the first leader of the new Party.

At the session of Parliament in 1960, the Progressive Party had twelve MPs. Eleven had been first elected for the United Party and one (a Native Representative Member) defected from the Liberal Party of South Africa. By the end of that Parliament in 1961, the group had been reduced to ten as a result of the abolition of the Native Representative seats at the end of 1960 and the resignation of one MP in January 1961.

== Electoral history ==
At the General Election, held on 18 October 1961, the Progressive Party performed relatively well for a new party, putting up a credible performance against the United Party in many of the seats it contested, especially in the Transvaal and Natal. However, the electoral system worked to the party's disadvantage, and although it came very close in Parktown, Helen Suzman in Houghton was the only Progressive Party candidate to actually be elected. It would be thirteen years before she again had party colleagues in Parliament. In that time Suzman was re-elected in 1966 and 1970. In those years, she singlehandedly did the work of an entire opposition party and would become a well known figure both inside South Africa and abroad.

Following the disappointing result of the election, support for the party amongst white voters had dropped substantially by 1966, and focus instead shifted towards attracting coloured votes. The Progressive Party won two seats representing coloured voters on the Cape Provincial Council in 1965. The National Party responded by extending the term of the four national coloured representative members, and ultimately abolished coloured electoral representation by 1970, thus preventing the party from winning those seats. Despite gains in some white constituencies, Suzman once again became its only MP or MPC.

Jan Steytler continued as party leader until December 1970, but being outside Parliament he was far less visible than Suzman. Harry Lawrence, a former Minister and the most senior of the MPs who had left the United Party in 1959, became temporary leader. In February 1971 Colin Eglin from Cape Town was elected party leader.

At the next General Election, on 24 April 1974, the Progressive Party made a major advance. In addition to Suzman, re-elected for Houghton, five other members won seats including Colin Eglin. A seventh member of the caucus was elected at a by-election soon after. Three members also won seats on the Transvaal and Cape Provincial Councils. This brought the party out of the political wilderness and set it on the path towards becoming the official opposition.

=== Election results ===
Election	Leader	Votes	%	Seats
1961	Jan Steytler	69,045 #3	8.66%	1 / 160
1966	Jan Steytler	39,717 #3	3.05%	1 / 170
1970	Jan Steytler	51,742 #4	3.45%	1 / 166
1974	Colin Eglin	72,479 #3	6.37%	6 / 169

== Merger with Reform Party ==
A group of reformists broke away from the left wing of the United Party in February 1975. Four MPs led by Harry Schwarz, formed the Reform Party. The Reform Party merged with the Progressive Party to form the Progressive Reform Party, following Congresses held in Johannesburg on 25 and 26 July 1975.

Subsequently, the PRP merged with another breakaway group from the United Party, which was in sharp decline in the mid-1970s, to become the Progressive Federal Party in 1977.

== See also ==
- Liberalism
- Contributions to liberal theory
- Liberalism worldwide
- List of liberal parties
- Liberal democracy
- Liberalism in South Africa
