= Helen Suzman =

South African anti-apartheid activist and politician (1917–2009)

Helen Suzman OMSG, DBE
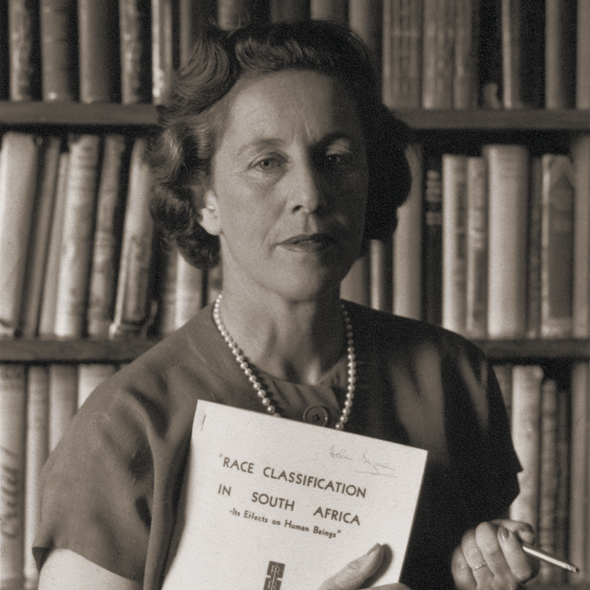
- Suzman in the late 1950s

Member of Parliament for Houghton
- In office 15 April 1953 – 6 September 1989
- Preceded by: Eric Bell
- Succeeded by: Tony Leon

Personal details
- Born: Helen Gavronsky; 7 November 1917 Germiston, Transvaal, Union of South Africa
- Died: 1 January 2009 (aged 91) Johannesburg, Gauteng, South Africa
- Party: United; Progressive; Progressive Reform; Progressive Federal; Democratic; Democratic Alliance
- Spouse: Moses Suzman
- Children: 2
- Relatives: Janet Suzman (niece)
- Education: University of the Witwatersrand

Helen Suzman (née Gavronsky; 7 November 1917 – 1 January 2009) was a South African anti-apartheid activist and politician. She represented a series of liberal and centre-left opposition parties during her 36-year tenure in the whites-only, National Party-controlled House of Assembly of South Africa at the height of apartheid.

She hosted the meeting that founded the Progressive Party in 1959, and was its only MP in the 160-member House for thirteen years. She was the only member of the South African Parliament to consistently and unequivocally oppose all apartheid legislation.

Suzman was instrumental in improving prison conditions for members of the banned African National Congress including Nelson Mandela, despite her reservations about Mandela's revolutionary policies, and was also known for using her parliamentary privilege to evade government censorship and pass information to the media about the worst abuses of apartheid. She was twice nominated for the Nobel Peace Prize.

== Early life and education ==
Suzman was born Helen Gavronsky in 1917 to Frieda and Samuel Gavronsky, both were Lithuanian-Jewish émigrés. She was born in Germiston, then a small mining town outside Johannesburg. Her mother died shortly after she was born.

Suzman matriculated in 1933 from Parktown Convent, Johannesburg. She studied for a bachelor's degree in commerce at Witwatersrand University. At age 19, she married Dr. Moses Suzman (who died in 1994), who was 33, and an eminent physician; the couple had two daughters, one of whom became a physician. Helen Suzman returned to university in 1941 to complete a degree in economics and economic history. After completing her degree she spent the rest of the war working for the Governor-General's War Fund and as a statistician at the War Supply board. In 1945, she became a tutor and later lecturer in economic history at Witwatersrand University.

== Career ==
=== Career before Parliament ===
After Suzman completed all levels of her college career, she was prompted to help her country by becoming a member of the war supplies board. Her position consisted of carefully calculating the statistical reality of various supplies, equipment quantities, and shortages of manufactured goods. Ultimately, Suzman pursued this career for a short period from 1941 to 1942. Later, in 1944, she followed in the footsteps of her husband by becoming a professor at the University of Witwatersrand, teaching economics . Suzman then decided to leave lecturing behind to conquer the political atmosphere in South Africa.

As a member of the South African Institute of Race Relations, she was involved in preparing evidence for the Fagan Commission's inquiry into laws applying to Africans in urban areas and into the system of migrant labour. She attributed this experience to her first real awareness of the hardship and difficulties experienced by Africans seeking work in urban areas.

=== Parliamentary career ===
Suzman has been described in The Guardian as having had "among the most courageous Parliamentary careers ever".

She was elected to the House of Assembly in 1953 as a member of the United Party for the Houghton constituency in Johannesburg.

The United Party caucus supported the second reading of the 1953 Separate Amenities Bill that provided for separate (and effectively unequal) facilities for Blacks, Coloureds, Indians and Whites. When the vote was taken, Helen Suzman and one other UP member refused to vote and walked out of the House.

Dissatisfied with the supine stance of the United Party to the apartheid policies of the Government, Suzman and eleven other liberal members of the United Party broke away to form the Progressive Party in 1959. The party rejected race discrimination and advocated equal opportunities for all with a qualified franchise with a common voter's roll.

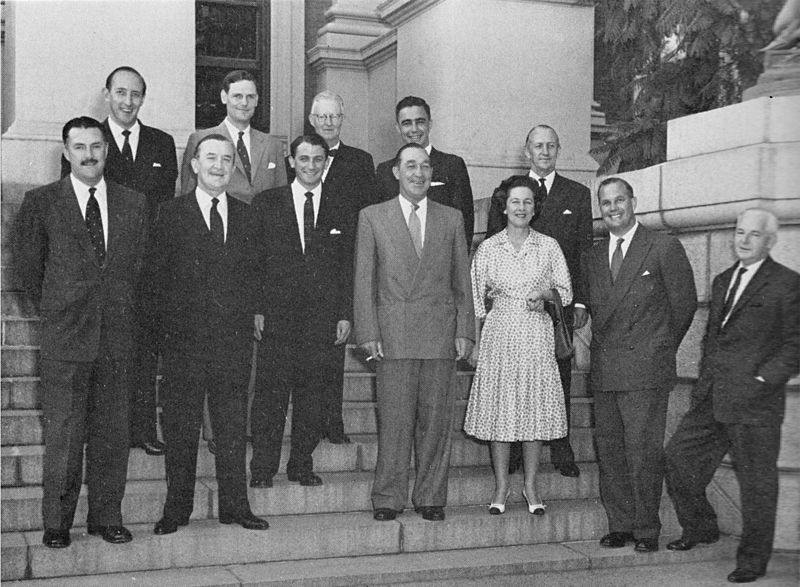
Suzman with the breakaway Progressive Party's House caucus in 1960. This was prior to the disastrous 1961 election that left Suzman as the sole parliamentarian opposed to apartheid for 13 years

In the 1961 South African general election, all the other Progressive MPs lost their seats, while Suzman retained hers by a margin of just 564 votes. This left Suzman as the sole parliamentarian unequivocally opposed to apartheid for 13 years from 1961 to 1974.

=== The solo years: 1961–1974 ===
After the 1961 election, Prime Minister Hendrik F. Verwoerd announced in Parliament that he had never believed the Progressive Party would be a threat and, turning towards Suzman, said "I have written you off". Suzman replied "And the whole world has written you off".

As the sole representative of her party in Parliament, she sought to do the work of an entire opposition party by herself. In her first session she made 66 speeches, moved 26 amendments and put 137 questions. Most of her questions concerned treatment of Black, Coloured and Indian people – on issues such as housing, education, forced removals, Pass Law offences, detentions, bannings, whippings, police brutality and execution.

Mandela later wrote: "She was undoubtedly the only real anti-apartheid voice in parliament and the discourtesy of the Nat MPs towards her showed how they felt her punches and how deeply they resented her presence."

For two more general elections (1966 and 1970), she was again the sole member returned for her party to Parliament. As a result, for 13 years, she dined alone in Parliament with no other MP to discuss tactics or approach. Often, as apartheid legislation was introduced, she would call a division of the house, a process whereby the members of the Parliament had physically to stand up and be counted. On many such occasions, as when opposing the infamous 90-day detention law, she found herself alone at one side of the Parliamentary chamber and all other MPs at the other side.

An eloquent public speaker with a sharp and witty manner, Suzman was noted for her strong public criticism of the governing National Party's policies of apartheid at a time when this was atypical of white South Africans. She found herself even more of an outsider because she was an English-speaking Jewish woman in a parliament dominated by Calvinist Afrikaner men. In her 13 years as the sole member of her party in the South African Parliament, Suzman made 885 speeches on almost every conceivable subject and posed 2,262 questions. In a period in which there were numerous laws passed imposing censorship on the press, parliamentary privilege ensured that her exchanges in Parliament could be published. She was once accused by a minister of asking questions in parliament that embarrassed South Africa, to which she replied: "It is not my questions that embarrass South Africa; it is your answers."

On one occasion, Prime Minister Verwoerd announced in Parliament to her: 'You are of no account. Your days in Parliament are numbered.' Suzman replied: 'Why? Are you going to put me under house arrest or put me on Robben Island?'

Early in her career, a white woman said at a caucus meeting, "Well, I don't know about Mrs Suzman, but when I go to a museum, I don't like it if some strange black man rubs himself up against me". Suzman retorted: "Don't you mind it if some strange white man rubs himself up against you?" Later in her career, she mused in Parliament: "I do not know why we equate—and with such examples before us—a white skin with civilisation".

=== Abuse and Suzman's responses ===
Suzman was subject to antisemitic and misogynist abuse by Nationalist MPs in Parliament and out. Frequent comments were made to her in Parliament such as "We don't like your screeching Jewish voice" or "Go back to Israel!" One Nationalist MP, Piet Koornhof, said to her in Parliament: "If I should come home one evening and my wife should rant and rave the way the hon. member for Houghton did this afternoon, there would be only one of two things that one could do to her... I think she deserves a good hiding". In May 1965 P. W. Botha (then Minister of Coloured Affairs) remarked: ‘The Honourable Member for Houghton... is in the habit of chattering continually. If my wife chattered like that Honourable Member, I would know what to do with her. There is nothing that works on my nerves more than a woman who continually interrupts me. She is like water dripping on a tin roof.’ In 1986, she had the following exchange with the then State President Botha: "Helen Suzman: Stupid! P. W. Botha: Woman!"

When Prime Minister Verwoerd was assassinated in the Parliamentary chamber in 1966, P. W. Botha, then Minister of Defence, had accused Suzman of being responsible, saying: "It's you! You liberals did this! Now we'll get you!" She demanded, and eventually received a formal apology, but the enmity between the two remained. In the early 1980s, she had stayed to observe police dismantle shacks in a black settlement and take the occupants to jail. P. W. Botha warned in Parliament that her conduct was bordering on illegal and said "I am telling you that if you try to break the law you will see what happens". Suzman responded: "the prime minister has been trying to bully me for twenty-eight years and he has not succeeded yet. I am not frightened of you. I never have been and I never will be. I think nothing of you." On one occasion, P. W. Botha said "The Hon. Member for Houghton, it is well known, does not like me". Suzman interjected: ‘Like you? I can’t stand you!’

She was often harassed by the police and her phone was tapped by them. She listed her name in the phone book and often received phone calls with obscene, racist and threatening messages. She had a special technique for dealing with such calls, which was to blow a shrill whistle into the mouthpiece of the phone.

Marie van Zyl, of the Kappiekommando (an ultra-conservative Afrikaner women's political organization), wrote to Suzman protesting the latter's support for "heathens" and boasting that her own people, the Voortrekkers, had brought the Bible over the mountains to the interior to the blacks. She asked what Suzman's people had done. Suzman replied: “You say your people brought the Bible over the mountains and ask what mine did. They wrote it, my dear …”

In February 1974, LJC Botha, Nationalist MP for Rustenburg remarked: ‘When she gets up in this House, she reminds me of a cricket in a thorn tree when it is very dry in the bushveld. His chirping makes you deaf but the tune remains the same year in and year out. In her fight for the Bantu, the honourable member... sings the same tune for year after year.’

Helen, being uprooted from her Jewish ancestry was considered a secular Jew, not formally representing herself in the political efforts at hand. On the contrary, she did place her motives for anti-apartheid on the prosecution of Jews. There was a time when the Jewish Board of Deputies adopted a policy to ignore all notions of anti-apartheid for the sake of keeping a certain demographic of people. Suzman was very unsatisfied with this decision and spoke up by saying "For me, for Jews to support the people who were in favor of race discrimination was the ultimate in treachery [of] the values that Jews should . Throughout her entire career, Suzman used her outspoken voice and political power to say the things that people were too scared to say.

She famously advised John Vorster, Prime Minister from 1966 to 1978, to some day visit a township, "in heavy disguise as a human being". When a minister complained of the murder rate in his constituency, she advised him not to go there "or it will rise by one".

=== Parliamentary career: 1974–1989 ===
Later, as parliamentary white opposition to apartheid grew, the Progressive Party gained a further 6 seats (in 1974) and Suzman was joined in parliament by notable liberal colleagues such as Colin Eglin. The party then merged in 1975 with Harry Schwarz's Reform Party and became the Progressive Reform Party. It was renamed the Progressive Federal Party when further MPs from the reformist wing of the United Party joined in 1977 and the party became the official opposition.

She spent a total of 36 years in Parliament.

After the 1976 Soweto shootings, MP Dr HMJ van Rensburg said: "It is a pity you were not one of them, Helen" and another called her "a saboteur of the police". Suzman herself said: "Every Nationalist MP should go to at least one funeral for unrest victims heavily disguised as human beings, instead of sitting on their green benches in parliament, insulated like fish in an aquarium."

In 1982, following Neil Aggett's death, she read out in Parliament a letter smuggled out of prison concerning Aggett's torture at the hands of the security police.

In 1986, there was the following exchange in Parliament when Minister of Law and Order Le Grange asked "Who is the hon Member for Houghton's No 1 man in South Africa? It is Nelson Mandela" Mrs Suzman responded: "Let him go!" Le Grange continued: "She admires him with everything she has. He is the only man who according to her can counteract the present unrest situation in South Africa and negotiate on peace". Mrs Suzman interjected: "That's right!"

=== Extra-parliamentary activity ===
Suzman was a frequent visitor to prisons to protect prisoners from warder brutality, and campaigned for improved prison conditions. She visited Nelson Mandela on numerous occasions while he was in prison and made representations to the authorities to improve his conditions and those of other prisoners on Robben Island. In his autobiography, Long Walk to Freedom, Mandela wrote: “It was an odd and wonderful sight to see this courageous woman peering into our cells and strolling around our courtyard. She was the first and only woman ever to grace our cells". Many of the prisoners, including Neville Alexander and Mandela himself, attributed improvements to their conditions, in part, to her visits: In his autobiography, Mandela attributes the removal of the sadistic warder Van Rensberg (aka "Suitcase"), who had a swastika tattooed on his hand, to Suzman's visit and her subsequent representations to the authorities and in Parliament. Neville Alexander, too, attributed the transfer of Van Rensberg to another prison, to Suzman's visit. Alexander noted that: "Had Mrs Suzman not come in February 1967 there is no saying what might have happened" According to Neville Alexander, it was "important to note that, unofficially, the first Suzman visit is considered to be the turning point in the treatment of the political prisoners at Robben Island. This was certainly no mere coincidence..." Andrew Mlangeni, a senior ANC member who was on Robben Island with Mandela, described how "[w]henever our treatment in prison tended to improve a little bit, we knew that Suzman was on her way. We would get things such as books that you perhaps ordered more than six months ago. Suzman also brought relevant books for the prisoners; Nelson Mandela later stated that he had read Natan Sharansky's Fear No Evil from cover to cover after being given it by Helen Suzman. They would give you your books if you were studying, because those were some of the things we raised on Robben Island. You would have to wait for months before you could get books prescribed by the University of South Africa and other institutions, but as soon as you got them, you knew that Suzman was on her way to see the conditions under which we were living, to see how best she could help us. Only a person such as Suzman could help us. The International Red Cross also used to visit us on Robben Island, but they couldn’t do as much as Suzman. Suzman was not afraid to go to Pretoria to the commissioner and raise these issues personally, to say that these were the conditions under which people were living, please bring about some improvement. She was a fearless lady."

She visited Robert Sobukwe when he was in virtual solitary confinement for 6 years and repeatedly sought his release in Parliament. During one debate in Parliament in which Suzman raised the conditions of Sobukwe's imprisonment without trial in a compound in Robben Island, Nationalist MP GPC Bezuidenhout asked: “Why do you say that he is living in a compound? Is it not a flat?” Mrs Suzman answered: “I wonder whether the hon member who is so cynical about this would care to take up permanent residence in that flat. Perhaps he will enjoy it.”

She visited banned persons, such as Albert Luthuli, Winnie Mandela and Mamphela Ramphele, and made effective representations on their behalf. In 1963, Albert Luthuli, then President of the ANC, wrote to Helen Suzman and expressed his "deep appreciation and admiration for your heroic and lone stand against a most reactionary Parliament...I most heartily congratulate you for your untiring efforts in a situation that would frustrate and benumb many... For ever remember, you are a bright Star in a dark Chamber...Not only ourselves – your contemporaries, but also posterity, will hold you in high esteem".

She visited Bram Fischer and other ANC and Communist Party political prisoners and personally provided them with speakers and records, seeking improvements to their conditions with ministers and in Parliament. She visited Fischer several times in hospital, calling repeatedly for his release and remarking in the press that with so many millions spent on security she did not understand why the government was so afraid of one incapacitated, bedridden old man. She was influential in his eventual release.

She attended the militant – and often dangerous – funerals of activists whenever invited to do so in the belief that her presence could prevent police brutality. She visited resettlement areas, townships and squatter camps, observing conditions and giving assistance to individuals where she could. She used these visits to arm herself with evidence from on the spot investigations "to challenge forcefully the government and bear personal witness to the suffering inflicted on millions of South Africans".

Suzman was inundated with requests for assistance from individuals harmed by the apartheid laws and bureaucracy. She regarded herself as the "honorary ombudsman of the dispossessed" and sought tirelessly to make representations on their behalf to the relevant authorities. Nadine Gordimer commented: "[But over the years I have observed – that when people are in trouble, she has been the one they have appealed to. She is the one everyone trusted]…Suzman never refused anyone her help, that I knew of. No matter how unpleasant or hostile the individual's attitude to her and her political convictions had been."

=== Other issues ===
Although principally concerned with issues of race discrimination, Suzman was also concerned with other issues including women's rights. Her maiden speech was on the 1953 Matrimonial Affairs Bill. Women's rights (and in particular those of Black women) became part of the larger fight for human rights. She campaigned against gender discrimination, particularly as it affected African women whose status in customary law was that of "perpetual minors." In 1988 she was instrumental in having matrimonial legislation enacted that greatly improved the legal status of women. She fought for equal matrimonial property rights for Black women, divorce by consent and the reform of abortion laws.

She was opposed to capital punishment and campaigned against its reintroduction.

In 1971, she was the only member of Parliament who voted against what she described as "the harshest drugs law in the world" that laid down a mandatory 2-year sentence of imprisonment for possession of cannabis and a mandatory 5-year sentence of imprisonment for possession of more than 115g of cannabis. She supported the decriminalisation of marijuana use, stating publicly that possession of marijuana/cannabis (or dagga, as it is known in South Africa) for personal use should not be a criminal offence.

=== Post-parliamentary career: 1989–2009 ===
She was appointed by Mandela to the first electoral commission of South Africa that oversaw the first election based on universal franchise in 1994. She was chairwoman of the Vaal Reef Disaster Fund for three years, appointed to look after the widows and children of the 104 men killed in the Vaal Reef mining disaster of 10 May 1995. She was president of the South African Institute of Race Relations, one of the premier research institutions in SA. She served as a member of the Human Rights Commission from 1995 to 1998.

She was present with Mandela when he signed the new constitution in 1996.

Speaking in 2004 at the age of 86, Suzman confessed that she was disappointed by the African National Congress. Suzman stated:

"I had hoped for something much better... [t]he poor in this country have not benefited at all from the ANC. This government spends 'like a drunken sailor'. Instead of investing in projects to give people jobs, they spend millions buying weapons and private jets, and sending gifts to Haiti."

Referring to South Africa's relations with Zimbabwe, whose president Robert Mugabe had in 2001 declared Suzman an "enemy of the state", she said:

"Mugabe has destroyed that country while South Africa has stood by and done nothing. The way Mugabe was feted at the inauguration last month was an embarrassing disgrace. But it served well to illustrate very clearly Mbeki's point of view."

Suzman also stated her distrust of the racial politics of Mbeki:

"Don't think for a moment that Mbeki is not anti-white – he is, most definitely. His speeches all have anti-white themes and he continues to convince everyone that there are two types of South African – the poor black and the rich white."

Perhaps conscious that she might be misconstrued, Suzman added:

"For all my criticisms of the current system, it doesn't mean that I would like to return to the old one. I don't think we will ever go the way of Zimbabwe, but people are entitled to be concerned. I am hopeful about any future for whites in this country – but not entirely optimistic."

== Recognition and criticism ==
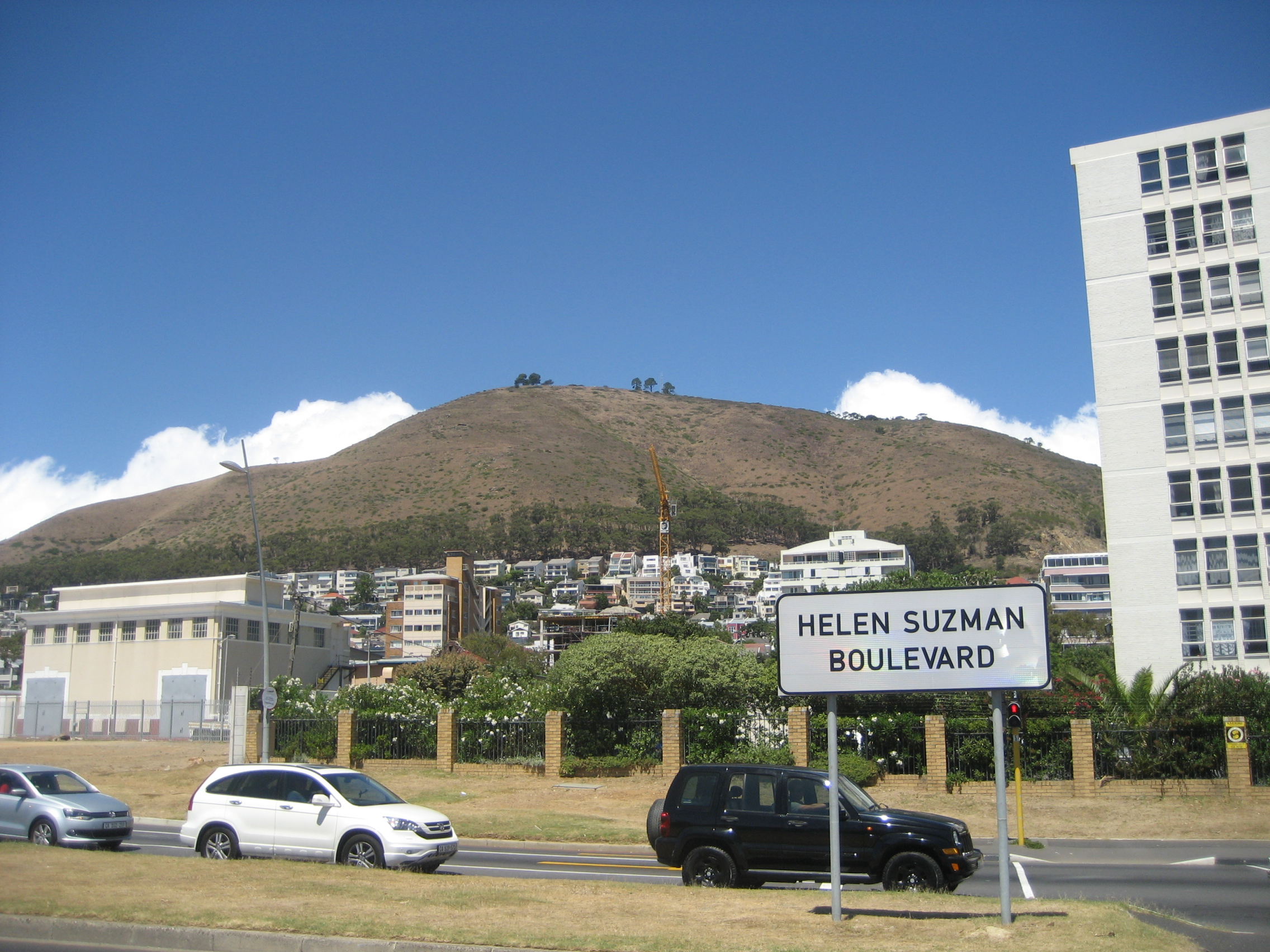
Western Boulevard in Cape Town was renamed Helen Suzman Boulevard in 2011.

Nelson Mandela has credited her with improving his prison conditions. Suzman spoke out against the regime but sometimes opposed Mandela's policies. She was critical of Mandela when he praised Muammar Gaddafi for his support to the anti-apartheid cause.

Mandela wrote a message to Suzman on her 85th birthday, stating "Your courage, integrity and principled commitment to justice have marked you as one of the outstanding figures in the history of public life in South Africa. On your 85th birthday we can but pay tribute to you, thank you and let you know how fortunate our country feels for having had you as part of its public life and politics." Mandela added: "Now, looking back from the safety of our non-racial democracy, we can even feel some sympathy for the National Party members who shared Parliament with you. Knowing what a thorn in the flesh of even your friends and political allies you can be, your forthright fearlessness must have made life hell for them when confronted by you."

She opposed economic sanctions, claiming it would be counterproductive and harmful to poor blacks, while many black in the anti-apartheid struggle argued that sanctions could not make things worse than they already were for Blacks. After Mandela's release "she was prominent among those...who persuaded him to drop the ANC's revolutionary program in favour of an evolutionary one, retaining a market economy and a parliamentary democracy." She continued to be a critic after the fall of Apartheid. According to her biographer, Lord Robin Renwick, before and after the ANC came to power, she continued to speak out against those in power who would "put party and state above the individual whether black or white".

Some in the ANC and SACP were critical of her method of opposition to apartheid. She was denounced as an agent of colonialism and "part of the system" for her vocal opposition to sanctions. She notably said on the subject "I am against disinvestment and sanction. I totally support Mrs Thatcher on this issue". She was accused by several in the armed resistance against apartheid of having contributed to delay the end of the regime by supporting Mandela imprisonment as long as he did not renounce armed struggle, while at the same time approving in parliament weapons procurement by the Apartheid regime from the United Kingdom despite several United Nations Security Council resolutions prohibiting arms sales to South Africa, and in 1970, she opposed the decision by the World Council of Churches to grant $200 000 to liberation movements in South Africa to finance their cause, calling the move "ill-advised". She supported several controversial bills that limited the rights of Black South Africans, purportedly because, as she had the habit of saying about such bills, it "represented a step in the right direction". For a long time, she endorsed only a qualified franchise for the black portion of the population, under which only educated blacks would have the right to vote. All this led the president of the ANC Oliver Tambo to quip that she was "clearly in favour of change - but determined to prevent change", while General Secretary of the SACP Joe Slovo said about her that "Mrs Suzman and I may both be against apartheid, but we are certainly not both for liberation".

Nonetheless, Mandela remained an admirer, saying to her "the consistency with which you defended the basic values of freedom and the rule of law over the last three decades has earned you the admiration of many South Africans." So did others in the anti-apartheid movement, including Winnie Mandela.

Suzman was awarded 27 honorary doctorates from universities around the world, including from Harvard, Yale, Oxford and Cambridge. She was nominated twice for the Nobel Peace Prize, but the Nobel Committee preferred to reward the less controversial Desmond Tutu in 1984, and she received numerous other awards from religious and human rights organisations around the world. Former Queen of South Africa, Elizabeth II made her an honorary Dame Commander (Civil Division) of the Order of the British Empire in 1989.

She was awarded the Order for Meritorious Service, Class I, Gold by Nelson Mandela in 1997. She was voted No. 24 in the Top 100 Great South Africans TV series.

She was awarded the Freedom of the City of Kingston upon Hull in 1987.

Suzman was elected to the American Philosophical Society in 2008.

Liberia issued a postage stamp to honour Suzman in March 2011, calling her one of the legendary heroes of Africa.

In November 2017, the South African Post Office announced that it "has honoured this great, brave and pioneering woman with a rare gesture of a postage stamp" as an "indication of her importance to the country and to the liberation thereof and to that of women".

The Progressive Federal Party of which Suzman was the sole Parliamentary representative between 1961 and 1973 became the Democratic Party after merging with the National Democratic Movement and the Independent Party in 1989. The Democratic Party was renamed the Democratic Alliance (DA) in 2000. In November 2017, former DA leader Mmusi Maimane paid tribute to Suzman, noting that "Every value we call our own in the DA can be traced back to the principles Helen fought for over her 36-year-long career as a Member of Parliament".

The poet George Szirtes wrote the poem "Song" in her honor.

The Helen Suzman Foundation was founded in 1993 to honour the life work of Helen Suzman. The Foundation seeks to promote the values espoused by Helen Suzman throughout her public life and in her devotion to public service.

In 2024, at the South African Jewish Board of Deputies' 120th anniversary gala dinner, she was honoured among 100 remarkable Jewish South Africans who have contributed to South Africa. The ceremony included speeches from Chief Rabbi Ephraim Mirvis, and Suzman was honoured with other anti-apartheid activists, Nadine Gordimer, Ruth First, Rusty Bernstein, Arthur Goldreich and Joe Slovo.

== Death ==
Suzman died in her sleep of natural causes on 1 January 2009. She was 91 years old. Achmat Dangor, the Nelson Mandela Foundation chief executive, said Suzman was a "great patriot and a fearless fighter against apartheid". Flags in South Africa flew at half-mast in her honour. She was buried in a private Jewish ceremony at Westpark Cemetery in Johannesburg led by chief rabbi Warren Goldstein.

== See also ==
- List of South Africans
- List of Jews from Sub-Saharan Africa
- Progressive Party

== Bibliography ==
- Joanna Strangwayes-Booth: A Cricket in the Thorn Tree: Helen Suzman and the Progressive Party. Johannesburg Hutchinson Group, 1976. ISBN 0-09 126080 9
- Ed. Robin Lee, Values Alive. A Tribute to Helen Suzman. Johannesburg, Jonathan Ball, 1990. ISBN 0-947464 23 9
- Ed. Phyllis Lewson, Helen Suzman's Solo Years. Johannesburg, Jonathan Ball and A.D Donker, 1991. ISBN 0-86852 191 4
- Helen Suzman: In No Uncertain Terms: A South African Memoir. New York, Knopf, 1993. ISBN 0-679-40985-8
- Exhib. Catalogue Helen Suzman: Fighter for Human Rights. Cape Town, South African Jewish Museum publ Kaplan Centre for Jewish Studies, UCT, 2005, ISBN 0-620 33955 1
- Helen Suzman Foundation: Focus: Tribute Issue 48, December 2007,
- Helen Suzman Foundation: Focus: Suzman Tribute Edition, Issue 53, April 2009,
- Gillian Godsell, Helen Suzman (Series: They Fought for Freedom), Cape Town, Maskew Miller Longman, 2011. ISBN 978-0-636-09816-9
- Robin Renwick: Helen Suzman: Bright Star in a Dark Chamber. London, Biteback Publ., 2014. ISBN 978-1-84-954709-3

House of Assembly of South Africa
Preceded by Eric Bell	Member of Parliament for Houghton; 1953–1989	Succeeded by Tony Leon
