= Harry Schwarz =

South African activist and politician (1924–2010)

His Excellency Harry Schwarz
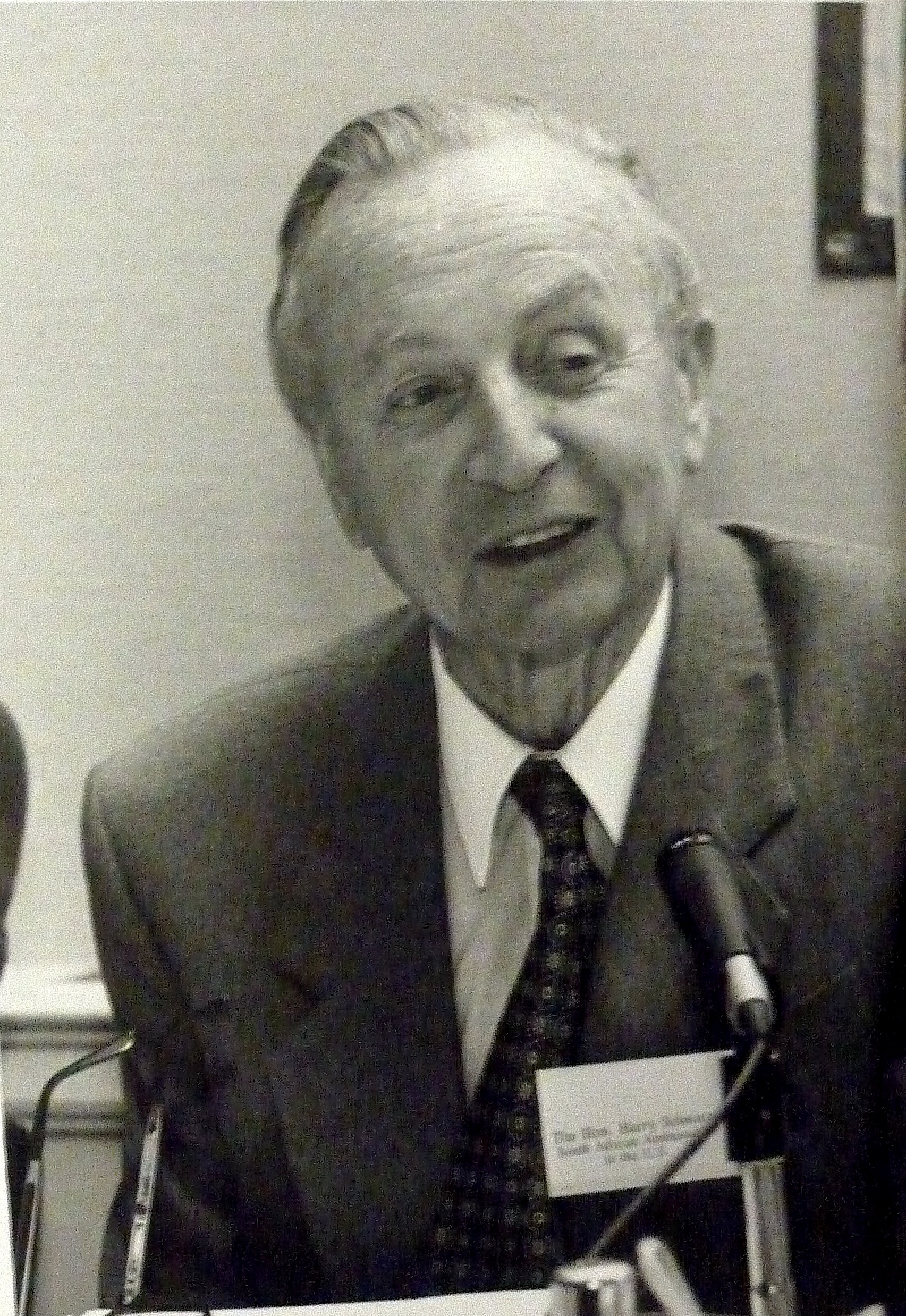
- Schwarz in 1993

South African Ambassador to the United States
- In office 6 March 1991 – 12 January 1995
- President: F. W. de Klerk; Nelson Mandela
- Preceded by: Piet Koornhof
- Succeeded by: Franklin Sonn

Shadow Minister of Finance
- In office 30 November 1977 – 5 May 1987
- Preceded by: John Jaminan
- Succeeded by: Jan van Zyl

Shadow Minister of Defence
- In office 1977–1984
- Preceded by: Vause Raw
- Succeeded by: Roger Hulley

Leader of the Opposition in the Transvaal
- In office 1963–1974
- Succeeded by: Alf Widman

Member of Parliament for Yeoville
- In office 24 April 1974 – 6 February 1991
- Succeeded by: Douglas Gibson

Member of the Transvaal Provincial Council for Hillbrow
- In office 1958–1974

Personal details
- Born: Harry Heinz Schwarz; 13 May 1924 Cologne, Germany
- Died: 5 February 2010 (aged 85) Johannesburg, South Africa
- Party: United Party; Reform Party; Progressive Reform Party; Progressive Federal Party; Democratic Party
- Spouse: Annette Louise Schwarz (m. 1952)
- Children: Jonathan; Allan; Michael
- Education: University of the Witwatersrand
- Profession: Lawyer

Military service
- Allegiance: South Africa
- Branch/service: South African Air Force
- Years of service: 1943-1945
- Rank: navigator
- Unit: 15 Squadron
- Battles/wars: World War II

Harry Heinz Schwarz (13 May 1924 – 5 February 2010) was a South African lawyer, statesman, and long-time political opposition leader against apartheid in South Africa who eventually was the South African Ambassador to the United States during the country's transition to majority rule.

Schwarz rose from the childhood poverty he experienced as a German-Jewish refugee to become a lawyer and a member of the Transvaal Provincial Council, where from 1963 to 1974, he was Leader of the Opposition. In the 1964 Rivonia Trial he was a defence lawyer. Advocating a more aggressive political opposition to the National Party's racial policies in the 1960s and 1970s, as Leader of the United Party in Transvaal and leader of the liberal "Young Turks", he clashed with the United Party establishment. He pioneered the call in white politics for a negotiated end to apartheid and in 1974 signed the Mahlabatini Declaration of Faith with Mangosuthu Buthelezi for a non-racial democratic society in South Africa. He was in the opposition for over 40 years and was a founding member of the Democratic Party. In light of his record, his appointment as South African Ambassador to the United States in 1990 was widely heralded as symbolic of the government's commitment to ending apartheid, and played a significant role in renewing the nation's image as the new democratic South Africa.

As a South African Air Force World War II veteran during the 1950s, Schwarz co-founded the Torch Commando, an ex-soldiers' movement to protest against the disenfranchisement of coloured people in South Africa. Described as South Africa's "most feisty politician" and a political "maverick", he was known for his parliamentary clashes with the apartheid government over its racial and economic policies. In his political career spanning 43 years, in which he gained respect from across the political spectrum, he never lost an election. In 1988 he received the Order for Meritorious Service and received several Honorary Doctorates. He was also one of the South African Jewish community's foremost leaders and spoke out strongly against anti-semitism.

Schwarz was described by the University of Stellenbosch as "one of the conceptual and moral fathers of the new South Africa" in the sense that he had not only been one of apartheid's most prominent opponents, but his ideas and the initiatives he had taken had played a key role in the development of the concept of a negotiated democracy in South Africa, based on the principles of freedom and justice. Nelson Mandela, a friend of his whom he visited while in prison, described him as a "champion of the poor".

== Refugee from Germany ==
Harry Schwarz was born Heinz Schwarz to Fritz (1897–1969) and Alma Schwarz (1901–1999) in Cologne, Germany. His family belonged to the Glockengasse Synagogue. He arrived in South Africa as a Jewish refugee from Germany in 1934 with his mother and younger brother Kurt. His father Fritz, a Social Democratic Party activist, left for South Africa the night the Nazis came to power. They boarded the SS Giulio Cesare in Genoa, Italy which took them to South Africa. When they arrived in Cape Town they stayed in one room in a house in Kloof Street. Schwarz described how he was "lucky" as eventually he was able to sleep in a bathroom in a rusty bath. He spoke no Afrikaans or English at first and had strong memories of being taunted on the schoolyard for being different. Schwarz stated in an interview in 1991 that "I know what the word discrimination means, not because I've read it in a book, but because I've been the subject of it. And I know what it means to be hungry." The discrimination and financial difficulties of his family left a strong impression on Schwarz and helped shape his political philosophy with its emphasis on social justice and the rule of law.

He attended Tamboerskloof School and South African College Schools in Cape Town and then Jeppe High School for Boys in Johannesburg.

=== Military service ===
Following his graduation from school in 1943, he was offered a job working for a stockbroker, as well as a university scholarship. However, Schwarz instead joined the South African Air Force during World War II in order to defeat Nazism. He served as a navigator and fought in North Africa, Crete and Italy. It was in the air force that he adopted the name Harry, as his Colonel said Heinz would not stand him in good stead if he were captured by Germans. He was in 15 Squadron and seconded to the RAF. In 1984 he was made an Honorary Colonel of the 15th Squadron.

== Wits University ==
In 1946 he went to University of the Witwatersrand (more commonly known as Wits University) in Johannesburg with the help of a Government loan and grant, where he first befriended fellow students and future anti-apartheid political activists Nelson Mandela and Joe Slovo. He joined the United Party and assisted in the 1948 election. However, as a result of the National Party victory, he was determined to become more active and was elected Chairman of the United Party branch at the university. He argued that the National Party's victory in 1948 was reversible and anyone who opposed them should concentrate on defeating them. In an interview in 1991, Schwarz said on the National Party victory that "To me, they were the people who had supported Germany during the war. As a young man, it was very objectionable to me that the very people I had been fighting against were the people that the National Party had supported." He was also president of the university's ex-servicemen's league and chair of the Law Students Council. He stood as a candidate for treasurer of the Students Representative Council and refrained from voting for himself which he considered to be unethical. When the votes were counted, it was announced that Schwarz had lost by one vote.

He was awarded a BA, with distinctions in both history and economic history, and later an LLB. In 1949 he was admitted as a solicitor and, later, as a barrister (Member of Middle Temple) in London, United Kingdom. In 1953, he became advocate at the South African Bar.

== Rivonia trial ==
In 1963, Nelson Mandela and many other political opponents were arrested and brought to court in the famous Rivonia Trial. Harry Schwarz was one of the defence barristers in the trial defending Accused No. 8 Jimmy Kantor, who was a close friend of his. Kantor was Mandela's lawyer in the trial until he too was arrested and charged with the same crimes as Mandela. After being the subject of vicious taunting and many attempts to place him as a vital cog of MK by Percy Yutar, finally Judge Quartus de Wet discharged him, stating Accused No 8 has no case to answer. Kantor along with Rusty Bernstein were the only accused who were acquitted. Kantor noted in his autobiography, A Healthy Grave, that Schwarz refused payment. Schwarz was refused access to Mandela while he was imprisoned on Robben Island, however he was granted access to visit him after 1988 when he was transferred to Victor Verster Prison. After the trial he left the Bar and became a solicitor so that he could concentrate on fighting apartheid.

During the trial he presented the case for Kantor as follows, "My Lord, it is difficult to reply in a restrained fashion. My learned friend must not use words such as 'Communist' lightly, when he refers to Kantor. Kantor is not a Communist. My learned friend has used the tactics of McCarthyism in an endeavour to smear him. I think, with respect, my learned friend is allowing himself to run away with facts that are not there. His complaint in count one is not that they found files with evidence. Oh not, he says that 'we found files with nothing in them', not in Kantor's office, but in the office of Wolpe. Then my learned friend [held] that the practice had been ruined and liquidated Kantor's practice. My lord, it is not Kantor. It is not Kantor! Why I say it is so difficult to be restrained, is that my learned friend has thrown in everything that concerns every accused in this case, and says 'that is why I don't want Kantor to get bail.'"

== Rise to politics ==
Harry Schwarz's political career started with his election to the Johannesburg City Council in 1951 for Booysens, which had been said to be an unwinnable seat against the National Party. Schwarz won the seat by 954 votes. Despite being the youngest person in the city council, he became chairman of the council's management committee - the most influential committee on the council. While in the council, Schwarz focused on challenging forced evictions of black and coloured people in Johannesburg, and attempted to improve housing and education. Booysens had once been occupied by Labour Party politician Jimmy Green, who was his wife's uncle, who was first elected in 1920 to the City Council.

In 1958 during a by-election Schwarz was elected into the Transvaal provincial council for the Hospital constituency. The constituency eventually was renamed Hillbrow. In 1963 he became Leader of the Opposition in the Transvaal Provincial Council, a post he would hold until 1974. He continued to practice law whilst in the Provincial Council and throughout his political career. However, he briefly withdrew from law between 1969 and 1974 to take up the position of Chief Executive of Merchant Bank.

Schwarz's vision for the post-apartheid South Africa was embodied in a document named the "Act of Dedication", of which he presented to the provincial council in 1973. The document, written by him, called for the Transvaal and the rest of South Africa to adopt and subscribe to the principles of a non-discriminatory society. While the UP Transvaal caucus unanimously adopted the initiative, the National Party refused to allow it to be debated in the council and parliament. Schwarz pushed for the adoption of the act in the 1973 National UP Congress, in which he succeeded.

== Tensions within United Party ==
In 1959, Schwarz remained in the United Party after 11 liberal United Party members broke away from the party to form the Progressive Party in 1959, opting instead to change the UP from within. By the early 1970s Schwarz had become known as the leader of the liberal faction of the party, dubbed the "Young Turks", who wanted the UP to adopt a more aggressive approach to the National Party and its policy of apartheid. Schwarz and his Young Turks faced fierce opposition and resistance from the party's national leader Sir De Villiers Graaff and other members of the UP's "Old Guard". Schwarz achieved prominence as a race relations and economic reformist in the party. In 1971 he became deputy leader of the UP in the Transvaal, a post specially created for him. However, internal divisions in the party between liberals and conservatives came to a head in August 1973 when Schwarz ousted Marais Steyn as the leader of the United Party in the Transvaal. Steyn had been an MP for almost 25 years and for 15 years had been a close adviser to De Villiers Graaff. After Steyn lost the election he defected to the National Party. Schwarz's victory was a visible sign of strength from the liberals within the party.

=== Mahlabatini Declaration ===
On 4 January 1974, Harry Schwarz met and had discussions with Gatsha (later Mangosuthu) Buthelezi, Chief Executive Councillor of the black homeland of KwaZulu. They agreed on a five-point plan for racial peace in South Africa that became known as the Mahlabatini Declaration of Faith. The declaration's purpose was to provide a blueprint for government of South Africa for racial peace in South Africa. It called for negotiations involving all peoples, in order to draw up constitutional proposals stressing opportunity for all with a Bill of rights to safeguard these rights. It suggested that the federal concept was the appropriate framework for such changes to take place. It also first affirmed that political change must take place though non-violent means. The concept of a non-discriminatory society had been outlined in the 'Act of Dedication' of 1973 that Schwarz had written, while Leader of the Opposition in the Transvaal. Schwarz had called for the Transvaal and South Africa to adopt and subscribe to the act. While the United Party Transvaal caucus unanimously adopted the initiative, the National Party refused for it to come to debate. The principles of the act were adopted at the 1973 National United Party Congress.

The declaration was the first of such agreements by acknowledged black and white leaders in South Africa that affirmed to these principles. The commitment to the peaceful pursuit of political change was declared at a time when neither the National Party or African National Congress were looking for peaceful solutions or dialogue. The declaration was heralded by the English speaking press as a breakthrough in race relations in South Africa. The declaration was endorsed by several chief ministers of the black homelands, including Cedric Phatudi (Lebowa), Lucas Mangope (Bophuthatswana) and Hudson Nisanwisi (Gazankulu). The declaration also received praise from liberal figures such as Alan Paton.

The declaration drew much media interest from both inside and outside South Africa. However, the declaration provoked an angry response from the UP's 'Old Guard', including the party's leader De Villiers Graaff and led to Schwarz and other liberals being expelled from the United Party the following year.

In March 1974 Chief Phatudi, Harry Schwarz and M. I. Mitchell (United Party MP), had discussions at Seshego. They issued a joint statement, endorsing the principles embodied in the Mahlabatini Declaration. It also stated that all South Africans must be united to meet any external threats, subversion, or terrorism, and that the best way of uniting the people to meet such threats was to give them a real stake in society which they were asked to defend.

== Parliamentary career ==
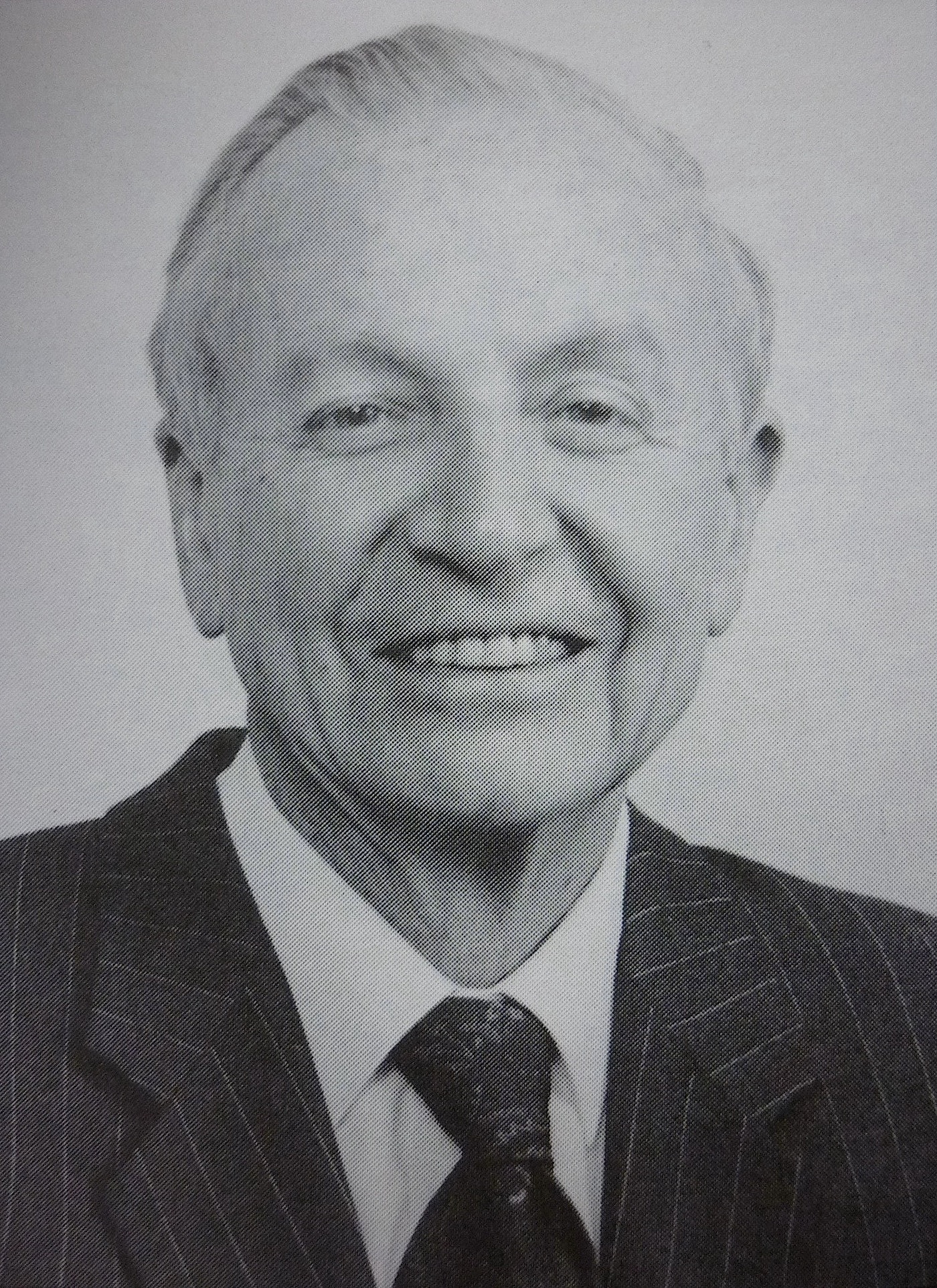
Harry Schwarz was expelled from the United Party in 1975 after delivering his "I am my brother's keeper" speech to Parliament.

=== Realigning opposition ===
Harry Schwarz played a key role in the realignment of the opposition in South Africa. In the 1974 general election, Schwarz was elected into Parliament for Yeoville, along with other liberal members of Schwarz's Young Turks. In February 1975, Dick Enthoven MP was expelled from the United Party by Sir De Villiers Graaff for "disloyalty". On 11 February 1975, when asked in Parliament by a National Party MP if he supported Enthoven's liberal positions, Schwarz replied "I make no secret of it. I am my brother's keeper". For not following the party line, Schwarz was expelled from the party. This led to the resignation of four other MPs, Senator Brian Bramford, ten members of the Transvaal Provincial Council, which made it the official opposition party in the Transvaal Provincial Council, 14 out of the 36 Johannesburg City Councillors and four Randburg City Councillors. On the night of the expulsion, the Reform Party was launched, of which Schwarz was elected leader. The party's charter mainly incorporated the Mahlabatini Declaration's principles and called for universal franchise and for equality to be extended to all.

On 25 July 1975, the Reform Party merged with the Progressive Party to form the Progressive Reform Party. Schwarz became the party's spokesman on finance, education and Chairman of the Federal Executive, while Colin Eglin, the former leader of the Progressives was elected leader of the newly merged party. In 1977 the party was renamed the Progressive Federal Party, when additional defectors from the United Party joined. This served to finally realign opposition politics in South Africa, as the PFP became the official opposition party in South Africa, following the 1977 General Election.

=== Leader of the opposition ===
Schwarz, as one of his party's co-founders, finance spokesman (1975–91), defence spokesman (1975–84) and Chairman of the Federal Executive (1975–79), was one of its foremost leaders and a prominent leader of the opposition. He was regarded the PFP's "star performer" in parliament. Along with others such as Colin Eglin, he was an iconic opposition figure. He was known nationwide for his sharp attacks on the National Party. According to veteran progressive MP Helen Suzman, Schwarz carried out his role so effectively as Shadow Finance Minister that National Party Finance Ministers lived in terror of him, particularly when the time came for delivering the annual budget speech. He served as deputy chairman of the Parliamentary Standing Committee on Finance and was on the Parliamentary Public Accounts Committee. During his 17 years in parliament Schwarz, along with other opposition leaders like Colin Eglin, Zach de Beer and Frederik van Zyl Slabbert forcefully denounced the government's racial policies, as well as its press restrictions and economic policies. Schwarz also played a key role exposing the Muldergate Scandal of 1979, that led to the resignation of Prime Minister B. J. Vorster, acting as the PFP's representative to the investigation commission. On several occasions, Schwarz received behind-the-scenes offers to take up a Cabinet position under a National Party government, which he refused every time.

Schwarz was often involved in heated clashes in parliament with government figures. In June 1980, Prime Minister P.W. Botha said to Schwarz, "You're the last person who will dictate to me", who was responding to Schwarz's accusation that the PM would be failing in his duty to South Africa unless he publicly repudiated the Minister of Posts, Hennie Smit, for his 'slow-thinking' remarks on Schwarz. In August 1989, Schwarz debated with Minister of the Budget Kent Durr live on Television in the House of Assembly. Schwarz slammed the NP economic policies and was regarded to have won the debate.

=== Opposition to press restrictions ===
In 1979, Schwarz appealed to the National Party and its leader to reconsider a bill that would, in the PFP's view, heavily restrict press freedom. He urged the Prime Minister: "I make this appeal to Mr Botha: Show this statesmanship, show that at this time you will not allow our unity of purpose to overcome the real problems to be threatened." In 1980, the National Party introduced the National Key Points Act that made those responsible for unauthorised reporting of incidents of sabotage or other attacks on declared national strategic targets a criminal. Schwarz slammed the attempts to restrict press freedoms, and stated that "Society as a whole is not condemned because individuals transgress, and nor should the press as a whole be judges by the actions of individuals." Stating that press restrictions marked a "turning point" in South African politics, he also argued that press freedom was a "precious treasure" and a free and courageous press was a major weapon in South Africa's defence against external threats.

=== Bill of Rights proposal ===
In August 1983 during the Constitutional Reform Debate Harry Schwarz submitted a motion calling for a 'Bill of Rights' to be incorporated in the new constitution of South Africa, the first motion of its kind ever brought before Parliament. He stated that the Bill should guarantee freedom from discrimination on the ground of race, colour, sex or creed, freedom of conscience and religion, of thought, belief, opinion and expression, including freedom of the press, of association, peaceful assembly and movement, and freedom to pursue the gaining of a livelihood. It also included freedom from deprivation of life, liberty, security and property, except in accordance with the principles of fundamental justice. It would also guarantee equality before the law and equal protection and benefit of law.

Schwarz argued that if included in the constitution of the republic, it would act as a "protector of rights many people had struggled to achieve in South Africa" as well as to "act as an inspiration" to the people of South Africa and would "be a unifying factor in a country in which unity of people is essential for survival". While virtually all MPs of the Progressive Federal Party supported the bill, no other party in Parliament supported it. Rejecting Schwarz's proposal, Daan van der Merwe of the Conservative Party stated that the bill, based on a "leftist-liberal political philosophy", would jeopardise the freedom of the white man. New Republic Party leader Vause Raw said Schwarz "a master at platitudes" was seeking idealistic freedoms that did not exist anywhere in the world. Following the rejection of Schwarz's bill, fellow PFP MPs' Helen Suzman, Colin Eglin, Ray Swart and Dave Dalling attempted a further four times to introduce a Bill of Rights. The Bills' were effectively blocked by the National Party by placing them at the end of the order paper. The constitution of the new South Africa, signed into law in 1996, includes a Bill of Rights, which includes the same principles of the 1983 motion.

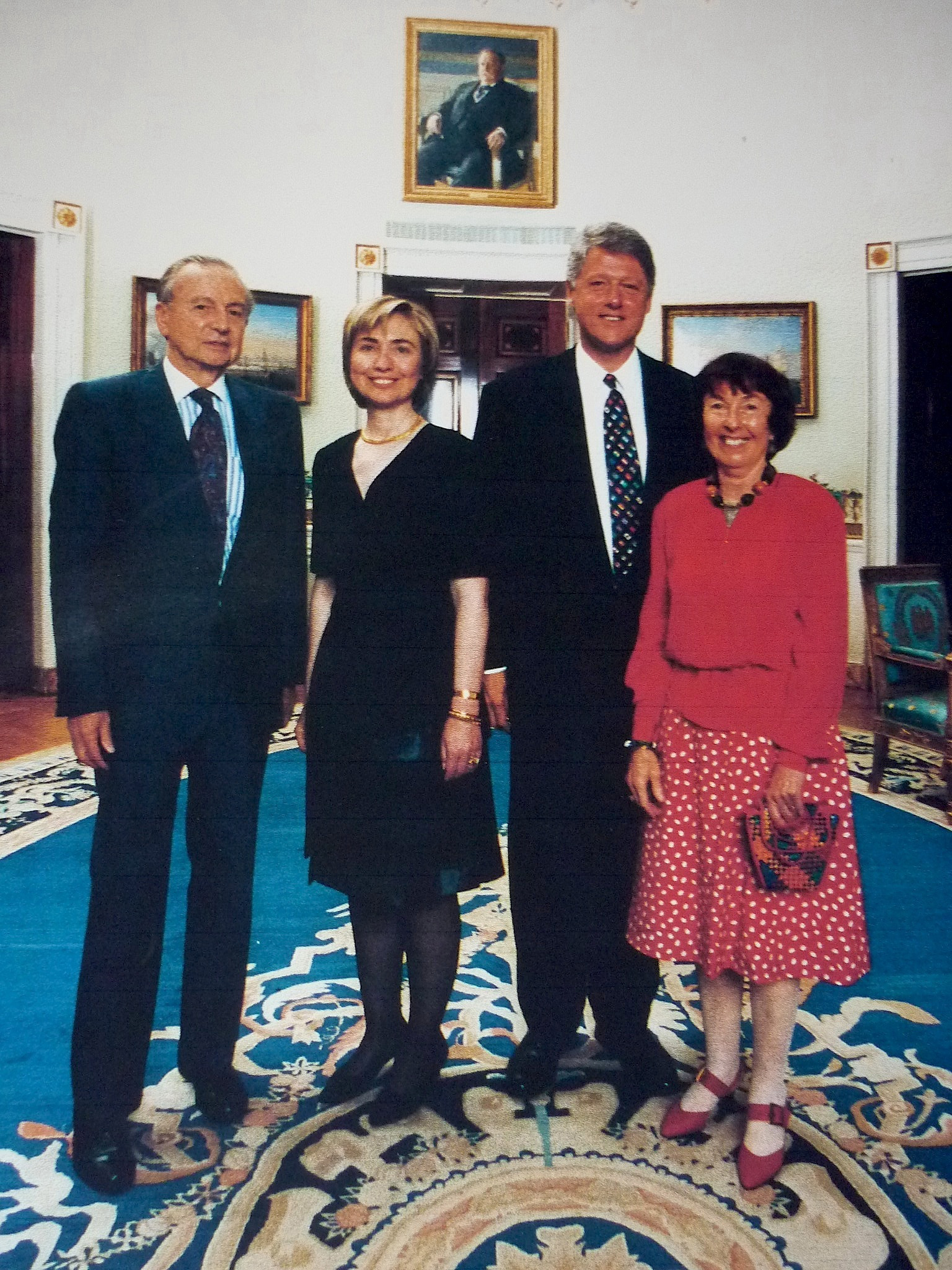
Harry Schwarz with his wife, President Bill Clinton and Hillary Clinton in 1993

=== Divisions within PFP ===
While distinctly on the left of South African politics, he was perceived to be on the right wing of the PFP mainly due to his favouring strong military defence and his insistence that political change must take place without the disruption of law and order, which earned him the nickname "Harry the Hawk". He often found himself in dispute with some members of the original Progressive Party, particularly Helen Suzman. Colleagues would often refer the clashes they had in the parliamentary caucus meetings as "the Helen and Harry show". Suzman wrote of her relations with Schwarz in her autobiography, In No Uncertain Terms: A South African Memoir: following the merger between the PP and Schwarz's Reform Party "I stayed in the party, but relations between Harry Schwarz and myself were very strained for some time thereafter. They improved only in 1986 when Frederik van Zyl Slabbert resigned from Parliament and the Progressive Federal Party. Harry Schwarz and I were the two most outraged members of the caucus, and our other differences faded into insignificance as a result. We developed a mutual respect for one another. Schwarz was an extremely able MP with a good financial brain, and a hard worker who could devastate National Party members in Parliament, especially Ministers of Finance, who feared his vigorous attacks. Like me, he could be unpleasant both in and out of the House. The differences we had were not on racial policy, but on his hawkish support of the South African Defence Force."

=== Democratic Party ===
Schwarz was one of the founding members of the Democratic Party. During the late 1980s and early 1990s, as its Spokesman on Finance, formulated its social market policy. Given South Africa's complex character, Mr Schwarz supported a federal system similar to that of the United States, as well as a justiciable Bill of Rights to protect the rights of minorities as well as the majority. This was also longstanding policy of the former Progressive Party dating back to the report of their Molteno Commission of the early 1960s. His economic philosophy was summed up in a phrase he often used: "Freedom is incomplete if it is exercised in poverty".

On 6 February 1991, he ended his career in parliament following his appointment as the South African ambassador to the United States. His farewell speech to parliament was entitled "Look after my people while I'm gone".

== Mandela prison visit ==
After the 1964 Rivonia Trial, where Schwarz had been on the defence team and where his university friend Nelson Mandela was imprisoned, Schwarz was barred from gaining access to Mandela. However, after Mandela was moved to Victor Verster Prison, various restrictions were lifted upon Mandela, including more lenient visitation rights. On 23 November 1989, Schwarz, following a request from Mandela, visited him in prison. After his visit, Schwarz called for the "immediate and unconditional" release of Mandela, stating that this was "in the interest of all South Africans - black and white - that this should happen as soon as possible".

== South African Ambassador to the United States ==
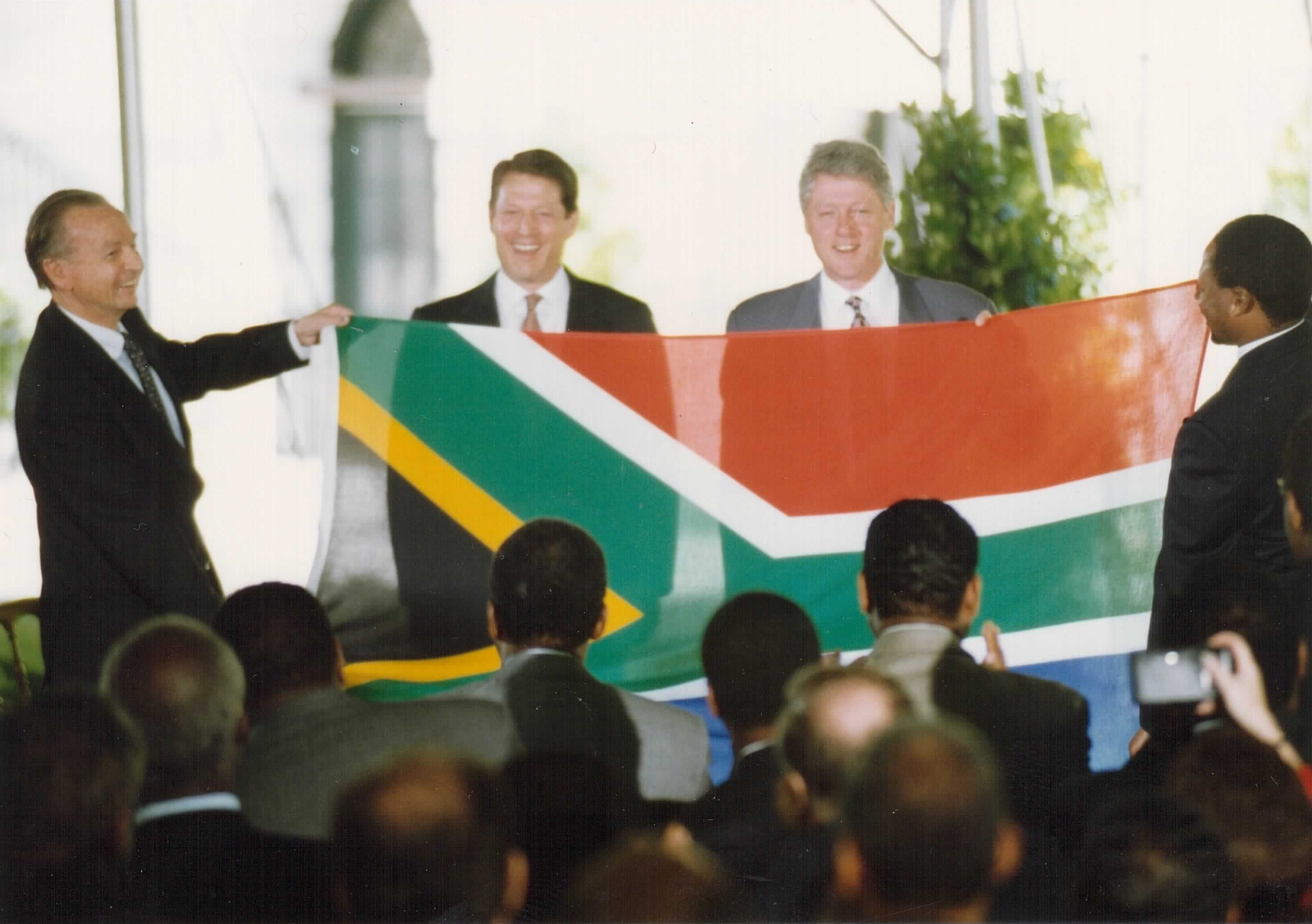
Ambassador Harry Schwarz unveiling the new South African flag to the United States and President Bill Clinton in May 1994

Harry Schwarz was the first serving politician from the parliamentary opposition ranks to be appointed to a senior ambassadorial post in South African history as well as the first Jewish ambassador. He was also accredited as the first South African Ambassador to Barbados in 1993 when diplomatic relations opened, and became the first South African High Commissioner to Barbados as from 1 June 1994, when South Africa rejoined the Commonwealth. Schwarz had previously received behind-the-scenes offers to accept a Cabinet position, by State President P.W. Botha and Prime Minister B.J. Vorster, but refused every time due to his opposition to apartheid. He agreed to the appointment of ambassador because of the government's commitment to the fundamental reforms that he had fought for, as well as on the terms that the National Party would not try to take his seat in Yeoville.

In an interview with the New York Times Schwarz said that "He hasn't asked me to change my political convictions," speaking of State President F.W. de Klerk. "He knows that I'm implacably opposed to apartheid. Otherwise, there's no logic in asking me to do this job." Nor, Mr. Schwarz added, was he bound for Washington to represent South Africa's five million whites. "I've made it clear that I want to be ambassador for 37 million people." A comment in the Boston Herald, typified the reaction among much of the US press: "When a man who has devoted most of his life to the struggle for a new South Africa tells you that apartheid is dead and that sanctions are holding up its burial, he speaks with a moral authority that is difficult to assail." The fact that Schwarz, a well known and respected anti-apartheid leader was willing to accept the post was widely acknowledged in South Africa as a further demonstration of President F. W de Klerk's determination to introduce a new democratic system.

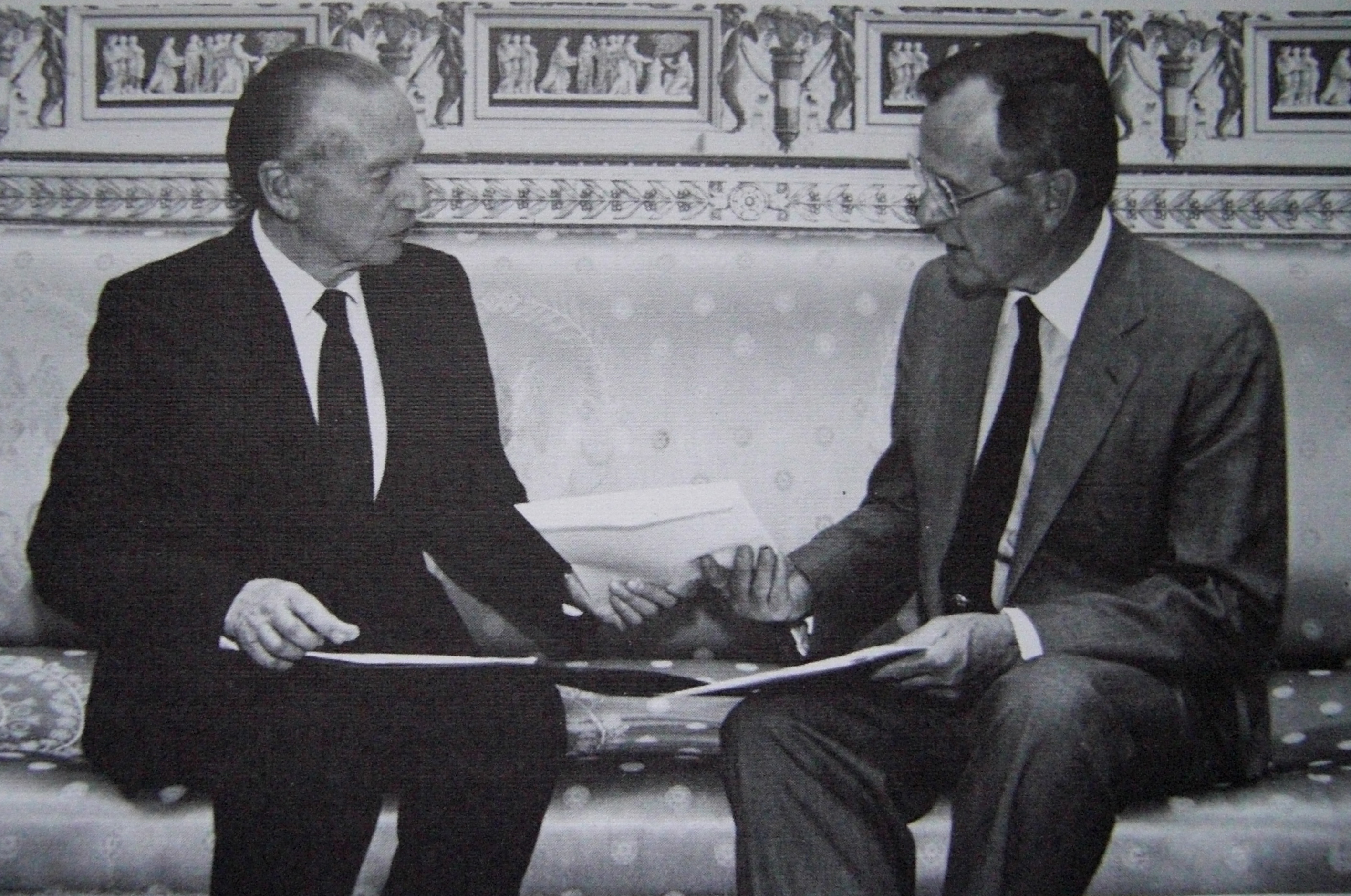
Harry Schwarz handing his credentials to President George H. W. Bush in 1991

=== Diplomatic legacy ===
Schwarz has been credited as having played one of the leading roles in the renewal of relations between the two nations. The Cape Times described Schwarz as having "engineered a state of US/South Africa relations better than it has ever been". The fact that Schwarz, for decades a well known anti-apartheid figurehead, was willing to accept the position was widely acknowledged as a highly symbolic demonstration of President F. W de Klerk's determination to introduce a new democratic system. During Schwarz's tenure, he negotiated the lifting of US sanctions against South Africa, secured a $600 million aid package from President Bill Clinton, signed the Nuclear Non-Proliferation Treaty in 1991 and hosted President Mandela's state visit to the US in October 1994.

After the African National Congress victory in the 1994 General election, President Nelson Mandela requested Schwarz remain as ambassador until after his state visit in October of that year, to which Schwarz agreed. Schwarz resigned his post as ambassador and returned to South Africa in November 1994, following his three-and-a-half-year tenure as South African Ambassador to the United States. At an event sponsored by the South African Jewish Board of Deputies in his honour, Schwarz urged the Jewish community to make the best of the changes taking place in South Africa and to contribute actively to the success of the country.

== Jewish community leadership ==
Beginning in the mid-seventies, Schwarz emerged as one of the South African Jewish community's foremost leaders. Schwarz often led the opposition to anti-semitic comments and movements by prominent public figures, and was often involved in heated clashes in parliament. In April 1982, Schwarz was ordered out of the parliamentary chamber after he described Nationalist MP Andre Fourie as "vuilgoed' (rubbish), in response to Fourie saying that he was "enough to make a Jew anti-Semitic". In August 1986, he took up the issue of anti-semitism within the far-right Conservative Party after its leader Clive Derby-Lewis responded to a question of whether Jews were "money and power grabbers" by asking "Is that anti-semitic or fact?". He also slammed the CP's supporters use of Nazi symbols and banners, and for burning the Israeli flags. While affirming that "the days of the Jews walking into the gas chambers are over", Schwarz also warned that the Jewish community should "not paint everybody with a broad brush", and that impulsive reactions should be avoided before "waging war". Furthermore, Schwarz would often use his access and relations with government ministers, police and the military establishment to investigate incidents of anti-semitism.

In 1987, Schwarz was involved in a heated clash with Eugène Terre'Blanche, Leader of the far-right paramilitary Afrikaner Weerstandsbeweging, after Schwarz confronted him during a speech over the organisation's racial policy towards non-Afrikaans and non-Christian citizens of South Africa. Following the confrontation Schwarz received a huge standing ovation from both English and Afrikaans members of the audience.

In relation to apartheid, Schwarz argued that Judaism was fundamentally opposed to segregation, and that "If we rationalise or condone discrimination against one group, we have compromised our principles and we are then not true to our beliefs or our history". He also argued that violent change could ultimately lead to a nondemocratic government, incompatible with Jewish ethics and with the interests of the Jewish community. He emphasized that Jews needed not only a democratic society for all, but also "The right to follow [their] own religion and love for Israel freely." He was assured in private meetings by Israeli Prime Minister's Shimon Peres and Yitzhak Shamir that Jews in South Africa would not become isolated and links with Israel would be maintained. He played an increasingly important role on the Jewish Board of Deputies from the 1970s, as chairman of its committee on international relations and often acting as spokesman for the board to Jewish agencies abroad. In 2005, he was made an honorary vice-president of the board, and remained active until his death.

Schwarz's lifelong friendship with Nelson Mandela also helped to ensure Jews in South Africa did not feel isolated with the unbanning of the African National Congress, and the subsequent election of Mandela as president.

== Business activities ==
While a senior politician as well as practicing law, Schwarz was also a business figure in South Africa. He held directorships of multiple companies, and was Chief Executive of Merchant Bank between 1969 and 1974.

== Later life ==
Schwarz retired from politics upon returning from Washington, and returned to law to practice in Schwarz-North in Johannesburg and continued to work until he died. His areas of legal practice were primarily corporate and commercial with special interests in banking, insurance, diplomacy and advocacy. He was highly critical of the Democratic Party's decision to merge with the New National Party in 2000 and in 2008 stated that the DP (now the Democratic Alliance) "should have sought an alliance with black political groups". He remained active in the Jewish community, notably as president of the South Africa-Israel Chamber of Commerce between 1999 and 2010 and vice-president of the South African Jewish Board of Deputies. Schwarz delivered his final public speech at the South African Parliament in November 2009 at a celebration of the fiftieth anniversary of the formation of the Progressive Party, in which he stated that "freedom is incomplete if it is exercised in poverty". Upon returning to South Africa, Schwarz and his wife set up a charity trust called the Schwarz Upliftment Trust. He lived in Johannesburg with his wife Annette, a trade unionist, artist and humanitarian who ran all of Schwarz's election campaigns. Annette died in February 2021 at the age of 94. They were married for 57 years with three sons and four grandchildren.

=== Death and tributes ===
On the morning of 5 February 2010, the South African Jewish Board of Deputies announced that Schwarz had died, following a short illness, at the age of 85. He was buried on Sunday 7 February in the section of honor in the West Park Cemetery in Johannesburg; the funeral was attended by hundreds of guests and family members.

Democratic Alliance leader and Leader of the Opposition Helen Zille led tributes to Schwarz. She said

Harry Schwarz will be remembered for his signal contribution to the development of our democracy. His piercing intellect, and long professional experience in banking, made him the most astute analyst in Parliament on economic and financial matters during his terms in office. He had strong leadership qualities and could inspire people to great achievements. He was an outstanding debater, both inside and outside Parliament. He could stand his ground against all-comers. His principled and steadfast resistance to racial nationalism was rooted in the key role he played in fighting Nazism during World War 2. He continued his resistance to racial nationalism through his long and distinguished career in South African opposition politics. He has engraved his place in South Africa's political history. We will always remember him.

South African President Jacob Zuma paid tribute to Schwarz in the introduction of his State of the Nation address to Parliament on 11 February 2010, the 20th anniversary of Nelson Mandela's release from prison and the 35th anniversary of the founding of Schwarz's Reform Party.

In a statement the Jewish Board of Deputies said of Schwarz: "One of the last of a generation of German Jewish refugees from Nazism who came to South Africa in the 1930s, he rendered sterling service to his adopted country, whether in the political, diplomatic, human rights, legal or Jewish communal fields." It stated that he was "amongst the most forthright and effective campaigners against apartheid" and said how he "remained actively involved in Jewish communal work to the very end." Zev Krengel, chairman of the South African Jewish Board of Deputies, said that "He was a man of formidable intellect and absolute integrity and was throughout his life a brave, unyielding fighter for justice." Rabbi Mendel Rabinowitz, who conducted the funeral said "Those like Harry, who contribute to society in so many capacities for so many years never die. Their bodies are laid to rest but the memory of them continues to live on."

Others such as former Leader of the Opposition Frederik van Zyl Slabbert, former Foreign Minister Pik Botha and the African Christian Democratic Party paid tribute to Schwarz for his record as an anti-apartheid campaigner and for his contribution to democracy and human rights in South Africa. The Pretoria News described Schwarz as the "Brother's keeper of democracy".

== Awards and honours ==
- Society of Advocates prize (1948)
- Transvaal Law Society Prize (1949)
- 'Newsmaker of the Year', Southern African Society of Journalists (1974)
- Honorary Colonel of 15 Squadron, South African Air Force (1984)
- Order for Meritorious Service (Gold) (1988)
- Human Rights Award "for opposing Apartheid and fighting for social justice", St Francis Academy (1991)
- International Honorary Citizen of the City of New Orleans, Mayor of New Orleans (1992)
- Humanitarian Award "for his commitment to human rights and for his enduring dedication to the state of Israel", State of Israel Bonds (1993)
- 'Moral Statesman of the Year', Anti-Defamation League (1994)
- Honorary Doctorate from the University of Judaism (now the American Jewish University) (1995)
- Honorary Life Vice-President of the Gauteng Council, Jewish Board of Deputies (2002)
- Honorary Doctorate from the University of Stellenbosch (2005)
- Honorary fellow of the Hebrew University of Jerusalem (2005)

Sir John Adamson Secondary School's hall was named, and remains to be, after Schwarz who was the first chairperson of the school's governing body.
