= Henry Gluckman =

South African politician

Henry Gluckman (1893–1987) was a South African politician. He served as Minister of Health from 1945 until 1948. He was the country's first Jewish cabinet minister. He was first elected to Parliament in 1938, representing Yeoville for the United Party. A member of the party's liberal wing, Gluckman was a proponent of racial equality and generous social spending. Between 1942 and 1944, he chaired the National Health Services (NHS) Commission. He proposed the free provision of medical care to all South Africans. The NHS would be financed by a health tax. Although his proposal wasn't ultimately adopted by government, it has influenced healthcare policy in the country. He criticized his successor A.J. Stals, who he believed, had mismanaged the Directorate of housing, causing a shortage of sufficient shelter.
