= Douglas Gibson (politician) =

South African attorney, politician and diplomat (1942–2025)

South African Ambassador to Thailand
- In office January 2008 – February 2012

Chief Whip of the Opposition
- In office June 1999 – May 2007
- Deputy: Mike Ellis
- Leader: Tony Leon
- Preceded by: Gert Oosthuizen
- Succeeded by: Ian Davidson

Chairperson of the Democratic Party Federal Council
- In office 1997–2000
- Preceded by: Dave Gant
- Succeeded by: James Selfe

Member of the National Assembly of South Africa
- In office 1994 – 15 January 2008

Member of Parliament for Yeoville
- In office 1991–1994
- Preceded by: Harry Schwarz
- Succeeded by: constituency abolished

Personal details
- Born: Douglas Harvey Monro Gibson; 8 August 1942 Union of South Africa
- Died: 9 May 2025 (aged 82) South Africa
- Party: Democratic Alliance (2000–2025)
- Other political affiliations: Several, including Democratic Party (1989–2002)
- Spouse: Pamela Gibson

Douglas Harvey Monro Gibson (8 August 1942 – 9 May 2025) was a South African lawyer, politician and diplomat who served as South Africa's ambassador to Thailand between 2008 and 2012. Previously, he had served as chief whip of the opposition from 1999 to 2007, as chairperson of the federal council of the Democratic Party between 1997 and 2000, and as a Member of the National Assembly of South Africa between 1994 and 2008.

== Career ==
Gibson was born on 8 August 1942. He qualified as a lawyer by profession. In 1970 Gibson was elected to the Transvaal Provincial Council for the Benoni Constituency as a member of the United Party. He went on to serve in the provincial council for sixteen years. He was also a town councillor in Benoni between 1972 and 1977.

In 1975, Gibson was a member of the delegation which concluded the merger between the Reform Party (led by Harry Schwarz) and the Progressive Party (led by Colin Eglin) to form the Progressive Reform Party, and he was a member of its successor parties ever afterwards. In 1991, he was elected as the Member of Parliament for the Yeoville constituency as a member of the Democratic Party (DP). Gibson was also the leader of the DP in Gauteng. During the Congress of a Democratic South Africa (CODESA) talks, Gibson served on the committee that handled South Africa's diplomatic corps.

Gibson became a member of South Africa's first democratically elected parliament in 1994 as one of seven DP members in the National Assembly. He was appointed chief whip of the DP caucus and spokesperson for Safety, Security and Justice. In 1997, he was elected chair of the DP's Federal Council, succeeding Dave Gant.

Gibson became Chief Whip of the Opposition following the 1999 general election, in which the DP replaced the New National Party as the official opposition to the African National Congress. When parliament reconvened for the first time after the election, he nominated fellow DP MP Dene Smuts for Deputy Speaker. Smuts lost to the ANC's candidate, Baleka Mbete. In 2000, the Democratic Alliance was formed out of a merger of the DP and NNP. James Selfe was then elected to lead the Democratic Alliance Federal Council.

Gibson continued to serve as chief whip until 2007, when Tony Leon stepped down as DA leader and Sandra Botha was elected to succeed him. Ian Davidson was appointed to serve as chief whip. Gibson was then appointed South Africa's ambassador to Thailand. He officially became ambassador in January 2008 and resigned his seat in the National Assembly. In February 2012, his term as ambassador ended and he returned to South Africa.

== Post-political career ==
In retirement, Gibson remained active in the DA and public discourse. In April 2017, he said that former DA leader Helen Zille was "past her shelf life" and urged her to retire after then-DA leader Mmusi Maimane announced that disciplinary proceedings would be taken against her for her controversial tweets on colonialism.

In June 2024, Gibson wrote an opinion piece, in which he announced his support for the DA and other parties forming a coalition government with the ANC after the latter lost its parliamentary majority in the general elections held the previous month.

== Death ==
Gibson died on 9 May 2025, at the age of 82. DA leader John Steenhuisen released a statement in which he paid tribute to Gibson.
