= Justus de Goede =

South African politician

Justus de Goede MPL

Member of the Gauteng Provincial Legislature
- In office 21 May 2014 – 7 May 2019

Member of the National Assembly of South Africa
- In office 1 December 2013 – 6 May 2014

Shadow Minister of International Relations and Cooperation
- In office 2013–2014
- Preceded by: Ian Davidson
- Succeeded by: Stevens Mokgalapa

Personal details
- Born: Justus de Goede
- Profession: Politician

Justus de Goede is a South African politician who served as a Member of the Gauteng Provincial Legislature between 2014 and 2019. He was a Member of the National Assembly of South Africa from 2013 to 2014. De Goede is a member of the Democratic Alliance.

== Career ==
=== Parliament ===
On 1 December 2013, he was appointed to the National Assembly of South Africa to replace Ian Davidson as a member of the Democratic Alliance. De Goede also succeeded Davidson as Shadow Minister of International Relations and Cooperation.

=== Gauteng Provincial Legislature ===
For the general elections that were held on 7 May 2014, De Goede was placed twentieth on the DA's provincial list. He was elected to the Gauteng Provincial Legislature as the DA won 23 seats. He was sworn in as an MPL on 21 May 2014.

Prior to the 2019 Gauteng provincial election, De Goede was ranked number 54 on the party's provincial list. He did not return to the legislature as the DA won only 20 seats.
