= Mahlabatini Declaration of Faith =

1974 principles for a future South Africa

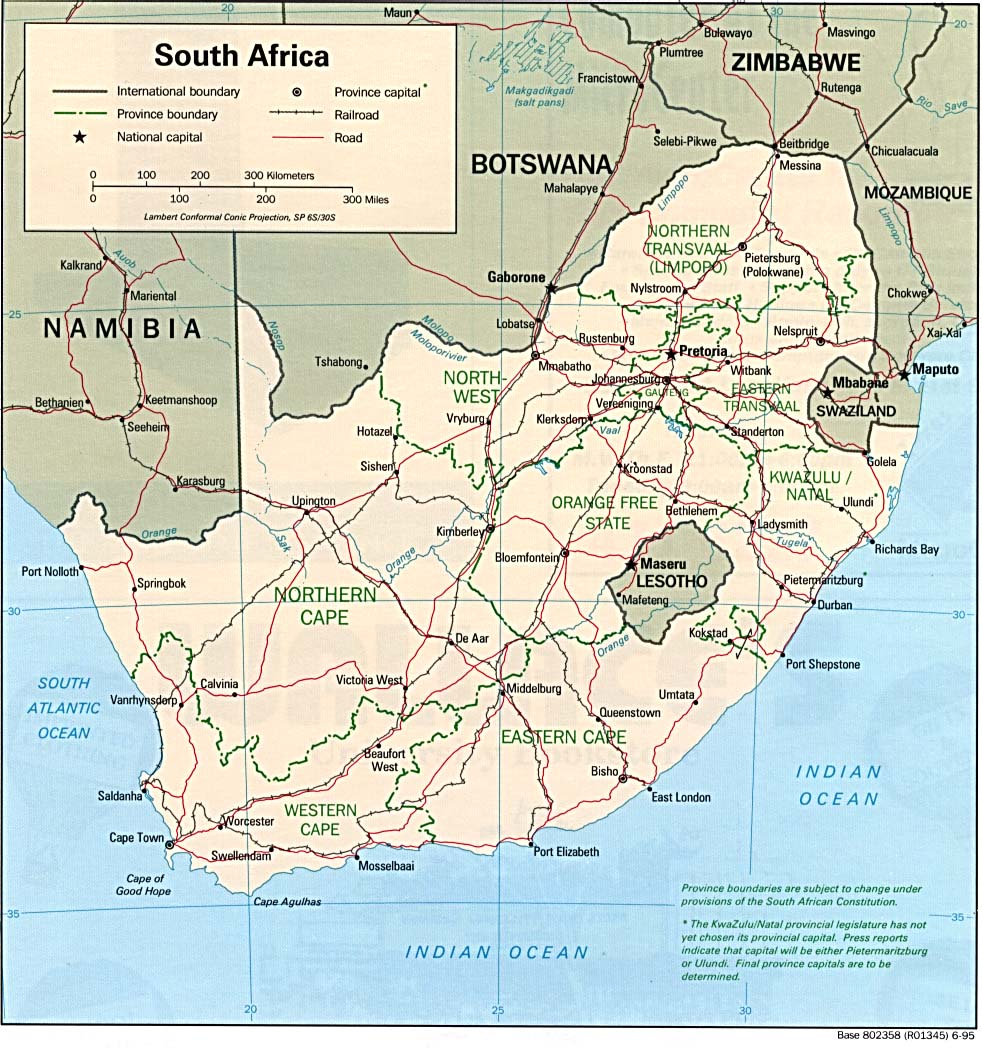
- A 1995 map of South Africa from The World Factbook
- Created: 4 January 1974
- Location: Mahlabatini, KwaZulu-Natal
- Signatories: Mangosuthu Buthelezi, Harry Schwarz
- Purpose: Provide a blueprint for government of South Africa by consent and racial peace in a multi-racial society

The Mahlabatini Declaration of Faith was a statement of core principles laid down by South African political leaders Mangosuthu Buthelezi and Harry Schwarz on 4 January 1974. It was signed in Mahlabatini, KwaZulu-Natal, hence its name. Its purpose was to provide a blueprint for government of South Africa by consent and racial peace in a multi-racial society, stressing opportunity for all, consultation, the federal concept, and a bill of rights. It also first affirmed that political change must take place though non-violent means. It was the first agreement in apartheid South Africa by acknowledged black and white political leaders that subscribed to such principles. Final negotiations, which embodied many of the Declaration's principles, took place between President F. W. de Klerk and Nelson Mandela in the early 1990s.

== Background ==
Signers of the Mahlabatini Declaration

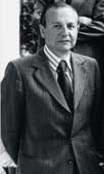
Harry Schwarz

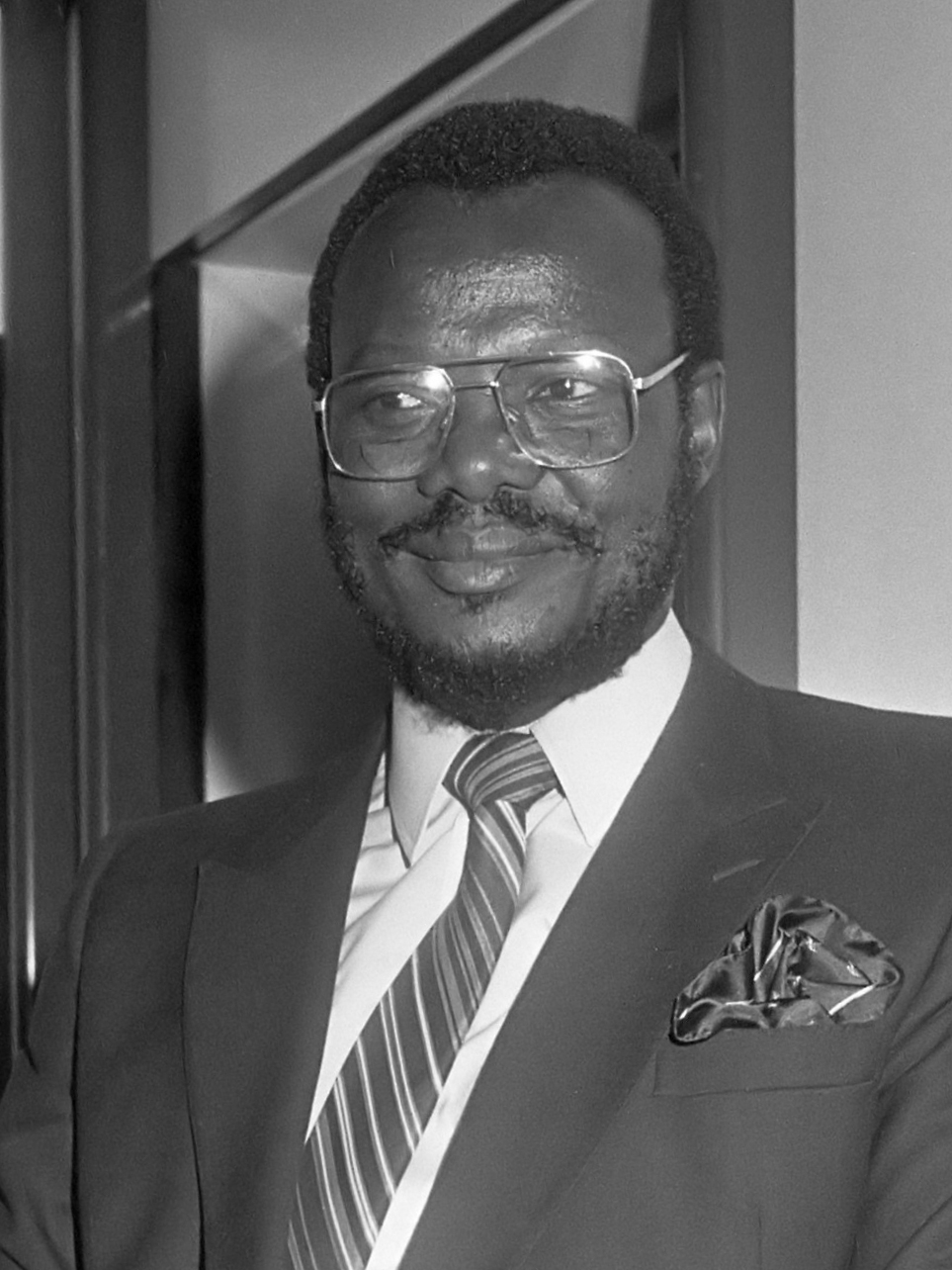
Gatsha Buthelezi

On 4 January 1974, Harry Schwarz, Transvaal leader of the official opposition United Party, met and had discussions with Gatsha (later Mangosuthu) Buthelezi, Chief Executive Councillor of the black homeland of KwaZulu. They jointly issued a document, which stated that "the situation of South Africa in the world scene as well as internal community relations requires, in our view, an acceptance of certain fundamental concepts for the economic, social and constitutional development of our country". It was intended for these core concepts to be the foundations for negotiations involving all in South Africa. Both leaders were acting in personal capacities.

The declaration's purpose was to provide a blueprint for government of South Africa for racial peace in South Africa. On the basis of five principles, the declaration declared a "faith in a South Africa offering equal opportunities, happiness, security, and peace for all its peoples." It called for negotiations involving all peoples, in order to draw up constitutional proposals stressing opportunity for all with a Bill of Rights to safeguard these rights. It suggested that the federal concept was the appropriate framework for such changes to take place. It also first affirmed that political change must take place through non-violent means. The concept of a non-discriminatory society had been outlined in the 'Act of Dedication' of 1973 that Schwarz had written, while Leader of the Opposition in the Transvaal. Schwarz had called for the Transvaal and South Africa to adopt and subscribe to the act. While the United Party Transvaal caucus unanimously adopted the initiative, the National Party refused for it to come to debate. The principles of the act were adopted at the 1973 National United Party Congress.

== Reaction and aftermath ==
The declaration was the first of its kind, in that it laid down the concept of a peaceful solution to South Africa's problems. The declaration took place during a period when virtually no formal or informal political contact existed between black and white groups. Political figures such as Alan Paton praised the declaration. The agreement was heralded by many as a breakthrough in race relations in South Africa and drew much media interest both inside and outside South Africa.

=== Black reaction ===
Shortly after the declaration was issued, several chief ministers of the black homelands, including Cedric Phatudi (Lebowa), Lucas Mangope (Bophuthatswana) and Prof HWE Ntsanwisi (Gazankulu), met in Cape Town. The leaders announced to the press that they fully supported the declaration.

In February 1974, Prime Minister of Swaziland Makhosini Dlamini praised the declaration as inspiration to South Africans "across the color line" and as an example of effectiveness in working for his people within the framework of the law.

In March 1974 Chief Phatudi, Harry Schwarz and M. I. Mitchell (United Party MP), had discussions at Sheshego. They issued a joint statement, endorsing the principles embodied in the Mahlabatini Declaration. It also stated that all South Africans must be united to meet any external threats, subversion, or terrorism, and that the best way of uniting the people to meet such threats was to give them a real stake in the society which they were asked to defend.

Days after the declaration, Die Vaderland, an ardent Nationalist Afrikaans newspaper, mocked Schwarz and Buthelezi calling them the "heroes of Mahlabatini".

=== Prime Minister B. J. Vorster ===
On 4 February 1974, Prime Minister B. J. Vorster of the National Party commented on the declaration during a speech to Parliament in which he announced a general election for 24 April 1974. Speaking of the Declaration, Vorster said:

"As far as Chief Buthelezi is concerned, I want to say at once that he is only one of eight chiefs. I regret the fact, because it could easily be misunderstood in the outside world, that some people and some newspapers adopt the attitude that he is the only Bantu leader in South Africa. As far as I am concerned, I want to make it very clear that I have respect for him in his capacity as leader of the Zulus. However, I have as much respect for the other leaders of the other Bantu peoples in South Africa. I want to go further - I am not doing him any injustice when I say this - by pointing out that some of the other Bantu leaders probably have more experience of public life than Chief Buthelezi has. Furthermore, I think that some of them are probably more careful when making statements."

=== United Party and opposition realignment ===
Despite considerable support from black leaders and the English speaking press, the declaration drew much criticism from the establishment of Harry Schwarz's United Party. Schwarz, who had recently deposed the more conservative Marais Steyn from the leadership of the United Party in the Transvaal, was a controversial figure in the party for his outspoken views against apartheid and was known as the leader of the liberal 'Young Turks' within the party.

In 1975 divisions over the Mahlabatini Declaration manifested in several 'Young Turks', including Schwarz, being expelled from the party, by leader Sir de Villiers Graaff. The members who were either expelled or resigned, formed the Reform Party, with Schwarz as its leader. In July 1975, the Reform Party merged with the Progressive Party, which eventually became the Progressive Federal Party in 1977. This proved to realign opposition politics in South Africa, with the demise of the United Party as the PFP became the main opposition party, following the 1977 general election.

== Original text ==
The situation of South Africa in the world scene as well as internal community relations requires in our view an acceptance of certain fundamental concept for the economic social and constitutional development of our country.

We respectfully record five principles on the basis of which we believe all our people can co-operate.

1. Change in South Africa must be brought about by peaceful means.

2. Opportunity must be afforded to all our people for material and educational advancement. The economy must be available to serve the needs of all able and willing to contribute, and the wealth, labour and expertise of our country should be harnessed to provide job and entrepreneurial opportunity for all groups.

3. Constitutions, blue prints and plans for the future should not be made by only some of the people for all others, they must be made with people. Consultation and dialogue lead to government by consent and with this in mind and as a first step a consultative council representative of all groups in South Africa should be constituted at the earliest opportunity.

4. The federal concept appears to provide the best framework on which to seek a constitutional solution for a South Africa free from domination by any group over others and ensuring the security of all its people.

5. Any constitutional proposals for South Africans must:

(i) Safeguard the identity and culture of the various groups constituting the people of South Africa.

(ii) Include a bill of rights to safeguard the fundamental concepts of natural justice.

On the basis of these principles we declare our faith in a South Africa of equal opportunity, happiness, security and peace for all its people.
