= Ian Davidson (South African politician) =

South African politician (born 1951)

Ian Davidson MP
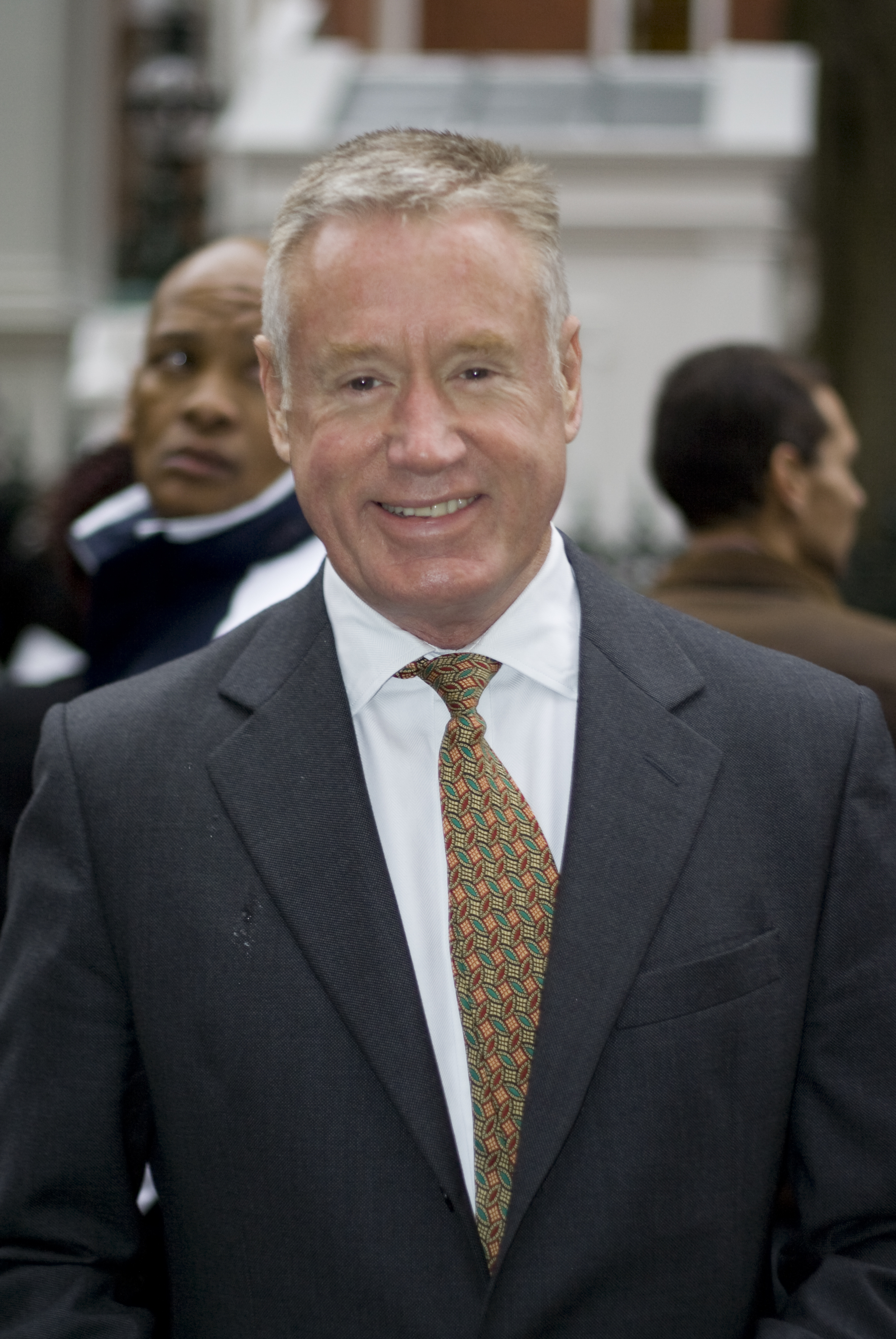

Shadow Minister of International Relations and Co-operation
- In office 2012–2013
- Leader: Helen Zille
- Preceded by: Kenneth Mubu
- Succeeded by: Justus de Goede

Personal details
- Born: Ian Ormiston Davidson; 1 January 1951 (age 75)
- Party: Democratic Alliance

Ian Ormiston Davidson (born 1 January 1951) is a former Member of the South African Parliament from the Democratic Alliance. He served as the Shadow Minister of International Relations and Co-operations from 2012 to 2013. He left parliament in 2014.

== Education ==
After matriculating from Parktown Boys' High School, Davidson went to the University of the Witwatersrand where he studied law. He has recently completed a Master of Law at the University of Stellenbosch.

== Politics ==
Davidson joined the Progressive Party in 1969. He served as Johannesburg city councillor from 1982 to 1994. Davidson served in the Gauteng Provincial Legislature from 1994 to 1999 and was first elected to parliament in 1999. In May 2007 he became the chief whip of the party in parliament, taking over from Douglas Gibson. Davidson held the position until he lost it to Watty Watson in 2011. He also served on the portfolio committee on finance, representing the constituency of Linden, Johannesburg.

He is openly LGBT+.
