= Yeoville (House of Assembly of South Africa constituency) =

Constituency in South Africa (1910–1994)

- Former constituency for the South African House of Assembly
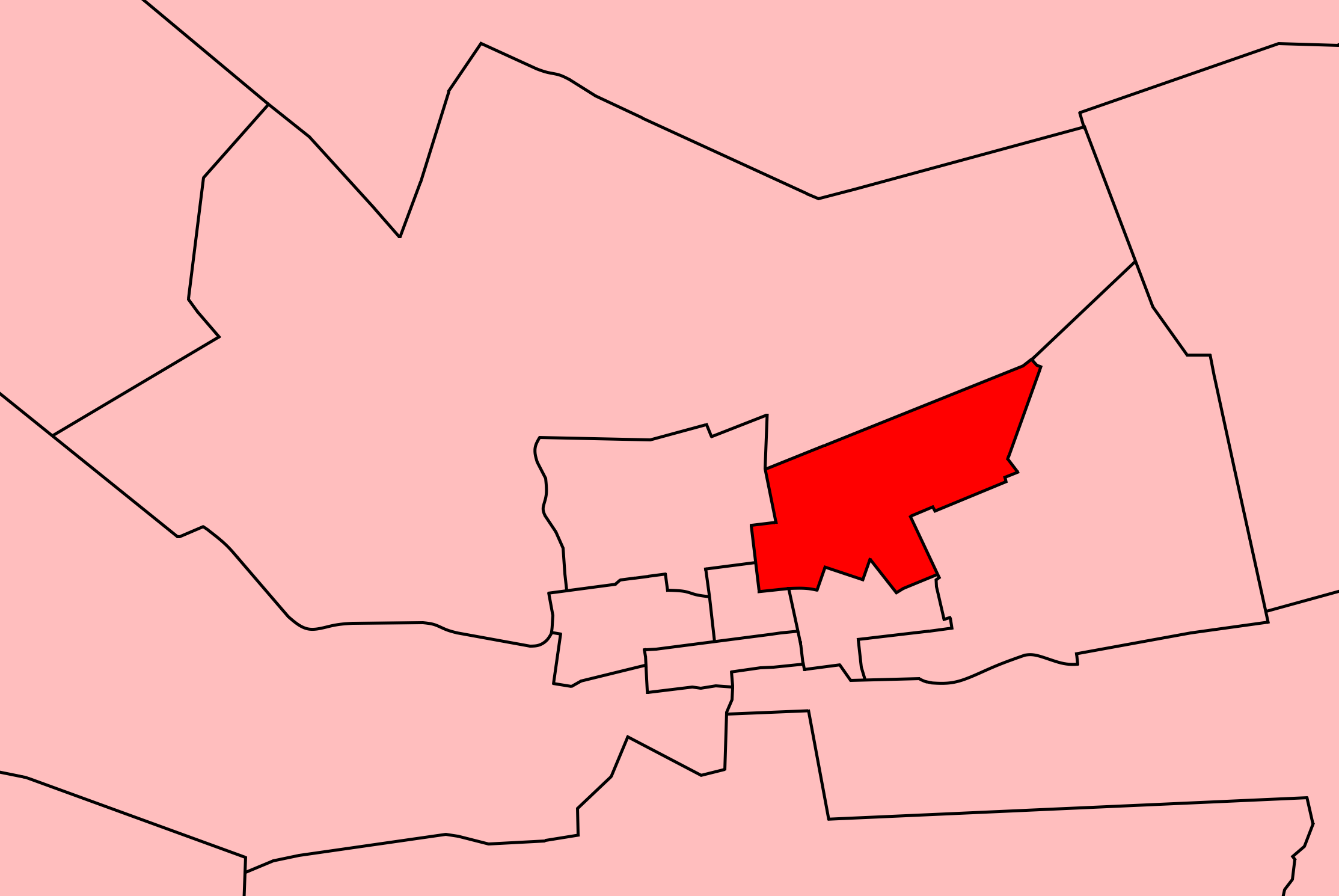
- Location of Yeoville within Johannesburg (1910)
- Province: Transvaal
- Electorate: 20,550 (1989)

Former constituency
- Created: 1910
- Abolished: 1994
- Number of members: 1
- Last MHA: Douglas Gibson (DP)

Yeoville was a constituency in the Transvaal Province of South Africa, which existed from 1910 to 1994. It covered a part of Johannesburg's inner northern suburbs centred on the suburb of Yeoville. Throughout its existence it elected one member to the House of Assembly and one to the Transvaal Provincial Council.

== Franchise notes ==
When the Union of South Africa was formed in 1910, the electoral qualifications in use in each pre-existing colony were kept in place. In the Transvaal Colony, and its predecessor the South African Republic, the vote was restricted to white men, and as such, elections in the Transvaal Province were held on a whites-only franchise from the beginning. The franchise was also restricted by property and education qualifications until the 1933 general election, following the passage of the Women's Enfranchisement Act, 1930 and the Franchise Laws Amendment Act, 1931. From then on, the franchise was given to all white citizens aged 21 or over. Non-whites remained disenfranchised until the end of apartheid and the introduction of universal suffrage in 1994.

== History ==
Like most of Johannesburg's northern suburbs, Yeoville had a largely English-speaking and liberal electorate. It was won at every election by whatever the main pro-British or liberal party was in South Africa at the time - first the Unionists, then the South African Party, then the United Party, then the PFP and finally the Democrats. Several of its MPs reached prominent positions in South African politics: Patrick Duncan served in cabinet under Jan Smuts and J. B. M. Hertzog, and resigned in 1937 to take up the post of Governor-General, the first South African citizen to hold that office. Henry Gluckman served in cabinet during Smuts' second administration, becoming South Africa's first Jewish cabinet minister, and was noted for his support for racial equality and universal health care. Marais Steyn was chairman of the Transvaal UP and a standard-bearer of the party's conservative faction, later defecting to the governing National Party and being elevated to cabinet under John Vorster and P. W. Botha. His successor both as provincial party chair and MP for Yeoville, Harry Schwarz, was a committed liberal and opponent of apartheid, who broke away from the declining UP in 1975 to form the Reform Party. After a series of mergers, this became the Progressive Federal Party, of which Schwarz was one of the leading figures (though never the party leader). He left parliament in 1991 to take up the position of Ambassador to the United States, and the seat was taken by Douglas Gibson in a by-election left unopposed by the National Party as a condition of Schwarz taking up the ambassadorship.

== Members ==
Election	Member	Party
1910	Lionel Phillips	Unionist
1915	W. T. F. Davies	Unionist
1920	A. E. A. Williamson	Unionist
1921	Patrick Duncan	South African
1924	Patrick Duncan	South African
1929	Patrick Duncan	South African
1933	Patrick Duncan	South African
1934	Patrick Duncan	United
1937 by	Maldwyn Edmund	United
1938	Henry Gluckman	United
1943	Henry Gluckman	United
1948	Henry Gluckman	United
1953	Henry Gluckman	United
1958	Alexander Kowarsky	United
1961	Marais Steyn	United
1966	Marais Steyn	United
1970	Marais Steyn	United
1973	Marais Steyn	National
1974	Harry Schwarz	United
1975	Harry Schwarz	Reform
1975	Harry Schwarz	PRP
1977	Harry Schwarz	PFP
1981	Harry Schwarz	PFP
1987	Harry Schwarz	PFP
1989	Harry Schwarz	Democratic
1991 by	Douglas Gibson	Democratic
1994	Constituency abolished	

== Detailed results ==
=== Elections in the 1910s ===
General election 1910: Yeoville
Party	Candidate	Votes	%	±%
Unionist	Lionel Phillips	1,658	75.6	New
Het Volk	Willem van Hulsteyn	534	24.4	New
Majority		1,124	51.2	N/A
Unionist win (new seat)				

General election 1915: Yeoville
Party	Candidate	Votes	%	±%
Unionist	W. T. F. Davies	1,951	80.9	New
Labour	R. G. Barlow	462	19.1	New
Majority		1,489	61.8	N/A
Turnout		2,413	76.6	N/A
Unionist hold		Swing	N/A	

=== Elections in the 1920s ===
General election 1920: Yeoville
Party	Candidate	Votes	%	±%
Unionist	A. E. A. Williamson	984	49.0	−31.9
South African	R. Goldmann	806	40.1	New
Independent	R. L. Weir	220	10.9	New
Majority		178	8.9	N/A
Turnout		2,010	65.6	−11.0
Unionist hold		Swing	N/A	

General election 1921: Yeoville
Party	Candidate	Votes	%	±%
South African	Patrick Duncan	Unopposed		
South African hold				

General election 1924: Yeoville
Party	Candidate	Votes	%	±%
South African	Patrick Duncan	1,682	68.8	N/A
Labour	A. Jacobson	755	30.9	New
Rejected ballots		8	0.2	N/A
Majority		927	37.9	N/A
Turnout		2,445	75.6	N/A
South African hold		Swing	N/A	

General election 1929: Yeoville
Party	Candidate	Votes	%	±%
South African	Patrick Duncan	1,559	67.6	−1.2
National	H. J. Schlosberg	735	31.9	New
Rejected ballots		11	0.5	+0.3
Majority		824	35.7	N/A
Turnout		2,305	84.7	+9.1
South African hold		Swing	N/A	

=== Elections in the 1930s ===
General election 1933: Yeoville
Party	Candidate	Votes	%	±%
South African	Patrick Duncan	Unopposed		
South African hold				

Yeoville by-election, 3 March 1937
Party	Candidate	Votes	%	±%
United	Maldwyn Edmund	1,988	50.2	N/A
Dominion	P. A. Moore	1,912	48.3	New
Rejected ballots		58	1.5	N/A
Majority		76	1.9	N/A
Turnout		3,958	49.7	N/A
United hold		Swing	N/A	

General election 1938: Yeoville
Party	Candidate	Votes	%	±%
United	Henry Gluckman	5,288	84.6	New
Dominion	M. G. de B. Epstein	922	14.7	N/A
Rejected ballots		41	0.7	N/A
Majority		4,366	69.8	N/A
Turnout		6,251	78.5	N/A
United hold		Swing	N/A	
