= Jimmy Green (South African politician) =

Jimmy Green was a South African Jewish trade unionist and a senior Labour Party politician. He was elected to the Johannesburg City Council in 1920 for Booysens and served as deputy Mayor of Johannesburg (1945–6). In 1951 he stepped down as a City Councillor for Booysens and was succeeded by Harry Schwarz, who was his niece's husband. He was also on the Transvaal Provincial Council.
