= Sir John Adamson High School =

Secondary school in South Africa

- Johannesburg, Gauteng, South Africa

Information
- Grades: 8 to 12

Sir John Adamson High School is located in Winchester Hills, a suburb in southern Johannesburg, Gauteng in South Africa. The school teaches grade 8 to grade 12. The school's motto is "Laetus Laborum" which means "Let Cheerfulness abide with Industry".

== History ==
=== Early years ===
F R Miller, in her Masters Thesis - The History of a Johannesburg Primary School 1902 - 1937 - writes as follows regarding the establishment of the school:

There seems to be no certainty regarding the exact date of the establishment of the school. Addressing a commemorative concert at the school in 13 April 1923, the second headmaster E J Butler reported that "as near as he could determine the school was this month 21 years of age.

During the course of 1902, 102 pupils (57 boys and 45 girls) were enrolled at the school and accommodated in a marquee. The first headmaster, G Newby, noted that he had to send home pupils in sub-standards and Standard II and III because the marquee was swamped by rain. Between 1903 and 1904, a more suitable school building was constructed by the Transvaal Education Department. It was designed to accommodate 250 children, was a zinc and wood building, and was erected at a cost of 2071.10 pounds. There were 200 children on the roll, and classes ranged from Sub A and Sub B to Standard Seven. School hours were then from 8 a.m. to 1 p.m.

In 1908, the Turffontein Evening Government School, at which elementary subjects were taught, was opened and a Senior Cadet Corps was started. By 1909 the situation at Turffontein might be described as "critical" with over five hundred children occupying a building originally constructed for two hundred and fifty, and on the 1909 - 1910 estimates of the TED, provision was made to construct a new school building for six hundred pupils, which would be adequate for the current enrolment. In August 1909, the school had to be closed for three days because of a snow storm. By December 1909, the numbers had increased to 490 and a lack of accommodation was felt. The estimated cost of the building was 11,075 pounds and its completion was waited with considerable anticipation. After several years of makeshift and inadequate accommodation, the new brick and wood building was complete on 11 October 1910, later that month, the school was closed for three weeks because of an outbreak of measles.

There is also a flagpole which was donated by Robinson Deep Goldmine in 1915 and remains in excellent condition. There have been alterations, additions and renovations to the building over the years but it remains essentially the same structure occupied by Turffontein Central, Intermediate and Sir John Adamson School until relocation to Winchester Hills in 1959.

The classrooms, situated on the east, west and north wings, were large and cold, and featured sash windows. The pupils sat in American dual desks and had two holes for the china inkwells. Each desk had a shelf underneath it on which pupils placed books and writing materials. Over the next few years enrolment continued to increase and by December 1915, nearly 1,000 pupils attended the school, making it one of the largest in Johannesburg.

==== Controversies ====
There are numerous complaints in the school records of the frequent absence of teachers. The school was overcrowded, having 880 on the roll. In 1914, school hours were from 8.30 a.m. to noon, and then from 1.30 p.m. to 3.30 p.m. From 1915, it seems that the school catered for classes to Standard Six only. Snow fell again in July 1915, and once again classes were cancelled,. About 1000 children attended the school in 1916. In some classes there were over 50 pupils, and accommodation difficulties were acute. On 30 April 1918, the school was closed because of Mr Newby's death, and Miss Lawrie took charge until 8 December 1918, when Mr John Butler took up duties as principal.

=== 1920s and 1930s ===
The House system – still in use at the school – was introduced in 1922. The four houses with their distinctive colours – Selborne (red), Buxton (green), Gladstone (yellow) and Connaught (blue) – were named after a high commissioner for South Africa, and the first three governors-general of the Union of South Africa. In order to meet the costs of the multiplicity of activities, a composite fee of 1s. per child per term was introduced. In 1928, the name of the school was changed to the Turffontein Intermediate Government School.

By 1931, the school budget was two hundred and twenty pounds and everybody paid a "modest subscription of six shillings per year". The largest expense noted by Butler in his report was 68 pounds, two shillings and three pence, spent on library books, extending the junior library and purchasing school prizes. One year later, it became a primary school and was renamed the Sir John Adamson School in honour of a former director of education for the Transvaal.

In 1935, after many years of planning and negotiating with the Education Department, a new library and restroom were opened at the school. The library was officially open on 19 October 1935 at a special assembly. Mr E J Butler handed the buildings over to Mr S P Bekker, the Administrator of the Transvaal and Mr G A C Kuschke, the Director of Transvaal Education, declared the building open.

Another change of name took place in 1937, and the school became better known as the Sir John Adamson Junior High School. Pupils who were enrolled in Standards II, III and IV at the time had to leave to attend other schools in 1938. In the case of the Standard IV group, this was particularly inconvenient as they returned to the school in their Standard VI year. In addition, the reorganisation meant that certain staff members - some of whom had had a lengthy association with the school - had to depart. In 1940, Ernest "Johnny" Butler, retired from the Transvaal Education Department. He had spent 22 years as school principal.

=== 1940s and 1950s ===
By 1940, the annual school subscription had risen to 1 pound. A large portion of the budget went to the school magazine which was given free to every pupil. Education was disrupted during the years of World War II when many staff members - both male and female - were involved in active service. In 1940, there were no less than eight staff members on Active Service: Pte. J R Evans, L/Cpl. J R Dick, P/N. N Valentine, 2nd Lieut. J Teare, 2nd Lieut. H R Corbett, 2nd Lieut. H Rogan and H P Tobiansky. Mr H Cartwright Robinson who was appointed Principal after the retirement of Mr Butler, spent only six months at the helm of the school before he volunteered for active service. In his absence, Mr H Holmes served as acting principal.

New buildings replaced the old wood and iron structures in 1945. These were officially opened by the Director of Education, Mr H H G Kreft, on 22 November. The pupils assembled for the ceremony in the playground. In the presence of members of the Witwatersrand Central School Board, Inspectors, local principals and parents, Mr Kreft opened the buildings with the gold key presented to him by Mr Spicer, the architect.

From the beginning of 1951, the school was known as Sir John Adamson High School. A governing body was instituted in 1952, with Mr H Schwarz as chairman. In the same year, the governing body instituted the first governing body prizes for bilingualism. It soon became apparent that the existing school grounds were far too small to accommodate a fully fledged high school. In 1953, Mr Whiteford expressed a need for at least twenty acres of land.

Plans of the new school, to accommodate 750 pupils, were drawn and approved in 1955. The first matriculation exam was written at the school in this year. The new building for the Sir John Adamson High School was removed from the provincial priority list and put on a list of schools to be built at a later date when sufficient finance was available. However, through the persistent efforts of those who had the interests of the school at heart, building started towards the end of the following year. The land on which the present school buildings are housed was secured by the first governing body of the school, and in particular, councillor Harry Schwarz, chairperson of the governing body. As a tribute to councillor Schwarz, the school hall - which is still in use today - was named after him. In 1957 the school's new badge was registered with the government and came into general use in 1958.

The foundation stone of the new building was laid on 7 June 1958, by Dr A H du Preez van Wyk, the then Director of Education. It was on this occasion too that the school song, composed by Miss Weiss with words by Mr J H Whiteford, was heard for the first time. The black marble foundation stone which was originally located outside of the school's main foyer was preserved during alterations to the administrative block in the 1990s and can still be seen - in its original position - inside the new foyer.

In July 1959, moving operations began. The School Board provided a 5-ton truck and, on this, over 400 desks, tables, chairs, library books, Science, Industrial Arts, and Home Economics equipment, office furniture, piano and pictures had to be transported more than two miles. The new school was officially opened on 31 October 1959, by the Administrator of the Transvaal, the Honourable Dr William Nicol. A new era in the history of the Sir John Adamson High School had begun.

With the move to the new building came many innovations. The school cadet detachment changed into a naval unit, and the distinctive prefects' blazers were introduced. For the first eighteen months, sporting activities were limited as the sports fields had not yet been completed, interschool sports had to be played at other schools.

=== 1960s and 1970s ===
By the end of 1961, many of the additional facilities and amenities essential to the running of a high school had been completed: the playing fields, tennis courts and hall. 1962 saw the holding of the first sports meeting at the new school and the swimming bath was completed in 1963. In 1964, a new science laboratory and art room were added to the existing building.

During the third term of 1965, a Sir John sports committee was established. This committee was set up to control not only sporting activities at the school, but all extramural activities. Owing to the efforts of the committee, colour scrolls for Academic achievement (Pro Meritore), Debating (Ars Oratoris) and Drama (Pro Arte) were awarded from 1966, in addition to the scrolls for achievement in sport. Also, pupils with three colour-awards and/or Provincial colours are recommended for honours blazers. Special honours ties were introduced, and the first of these were presented to Mr D J Rees in August 1967. All prefects, and pupils with honours blazers, are entitled to wear these ties.

In 1973, a five-year plan focussing on the provision of future facilities was announced. By 1974, there was a pre-cast concrete fence in front of the school, the school owned four buses, a basketball court and a six-bay garage for the school buses had been constructed. In 1975 and 1976, the main improvements included the grassing of the hockey field, the completion of concrete netball fields, precast fencing around the swimming pool, swimming change rooms, the first stages of a concrete pavilion and a languages room. The completion of the pavilion was planned for 1977 when the school would celebrate its 75th anniversary but was completed a year in advance. In 1981 two new laboratories and two new centres were opened and taken into use.

=== 1980s and 1990s ===
The 1980s were a very difficult period in terms of staffing. Mr. Hankey, who assumed duty as principal in 1981 remarked that the school's "greatest liability was a shortage of teachers" and identified this as the "biggest problem that our schools are facing today".

In 1991, a long-awaited political change swept through the country, the school opted to become a "Model B" school. Thus, in 1992, Sir John opened its doors to pupils of all races for the first time in its history. During the course of 1992, the Government changed the status of the school to that of "Model C". The entire principle of "free" education changed and, with the exception of staff salaries, the parents became responsible for the financial needs of the school.

After many years of planning, a computer room eventually became a reality. Initially, there were 15 pupil workstations installed and pupils were given the opportunity to use the centre during school time. Unfortunately, the school was unable to keep up with the rapid changes in technology and the centre was soon outdated. It was only in 2001 that a new state-of-the-art computer room was opened. Computing was introduced as an examination subject at Grade 10 level and Junior pupils were given the opportunity to make use of the centre under the guidance of Future Kids.

In March 1996, all four education departments in Gauteng – products of the Apartheid government – merged to form the Gauteng Department of Education. A new SA schools bill completely changed education in South Africa. As a result of government rationalisation that accompanied the dramatic changes occurring in educational years, many staff members opted for early retirement or voluntary severance packages. The sweeping changes included a teacher–pupil ratio of 35:1. In order to maintain the standards of education that had characterised the long history of our school, it was decided to appoint additional staff on the governing body's payroll.

In 1998, under the guidance of the current principal – R J de Beer – extensive alterations were completed on the administrative block which completely changed the physical face of the school.

=== 2000 to present ===
In 2001, the school re-organisation fell in line with the introduction of Outcomes Based Education with its eight learning areas: language, literacy and communication; mathematical literacy, mathematics and mathematical studies; natural sciences; human and social sciences, economic and management sciences; technology, life orientation and arts and culture. The emphasis within the classroom shifted to the attainment of expected outcomes and continuous assessment.

In 2004, the long-awaited utility hall was built and opened on 31 August 2004, by Mr. Plessis, chairman of the governing body. Ms de Beer, left the school at the end of 2004.

== Extramurals ==
- Athletics
- Chess
- Choir
- Cricket
- Cross Country
- Debating
- Drama
- Drum Majorettes
- First Aid
- Hindu Students Association
- Hockey
- Netball
- Public Speaking
- Rugby
- SCA
- Soccer
- Swimming
- Tennis
- Touchrugby
- Volleyball

== Recipients of Honours Blazers ==
Every year students who have been awarded three scrolls (for excellence in their respective fields) are presented with an Honours Blazer.

== Magna Cum Laude Award ==
The Magna Cum Laude Award is the school's most prestigious award. It is awarded to matriculants who exhibit a generosity of spirit, humility and unselfishness in school life; who display loyalty, dedication and qualities of responsibility, integrity and reliability.

== School headmasters ==
- G Newby (1903–1918)
- E J Butler (1918–1940)
- H C Robinson (1940)
- A Bovet (1946)
- J H Whiteford (1948–1958)
- D J Rees (1958–1970)
- J W Holman (1971–1973)
- J L Archer (1974–1978)
- G D Kallman (1979)
- S E Hankey (1981–1991)
- E E Butler (1992–1997)
- R J De Beer (1997–2004)
- M Meyers (2006–2025)
- F.J Wellington (2025–Present) Acting Principal

== Notable alumni ==
- Carmel Fisher - Actress
- Junior Singo - Actor
- Tumi Masemola - Actress, singer (member of Gang of Instrumentals), producer
- Tsitsi Chuimya - Comedian
