= Trew =

Trew is a surname. Notable people with the surname include:

== People ==
- Abdias Trew (1597–1669), German mathematician
- Antony Trew (1906–1996), South African writer and business man
- Arisa Trew (born 2010), Australian Olympic champion skateboarder
- Arthur Trew (19th c.), Irish stevedore and Protestant preacher
- Beatrice Trew (1897–1976), Canadian politician
- Billy Trew (1878–1926), Welsh rugby union player
- Christoph Jacob Trew (1695–1769), German botanist
- Kim Trew (born 1953), Canadian politician
- Peter Trew (born 1932), English politician
- Ray Trew (born 1954), British businessman and football executive
- Simon Trew (born 1965), British historian
- Susan Trew (born 1853), English composer
- Tony Trew (born 1941), South African politician

== Fictional characters ==
- Thomas Trew, the main character in a fantasy series, see author Sophie Masson

== See also ==
- Andrew Trew Wood (1826–1903) Canadian businessman and politician
- Trews (disambiguation)
