= Tony Trew =

OLS Tony Trew
- Born: Anthony Andrew Trew; 6 July 1941 (age 84); Cape Town, Union of South Africa
- Known for: Critical discourse analysis
- Notable work: Language and control
- Political party: ANC
- Parents: Antony Francis Trew (father); Nora Houthakker (mother)

Tony Trew (also known as Anthony Andrew Trew) (Cape Town, 6 July 1941) is a South African politician and discourse analyst. He was one of the editors of the seminal book Language and control (1979), which helped establish critical linguistics as an academic field.

== Early life ==
Trew was born in Cape Town to father, Antony Trew, naval officer and author and mother Nora Houthakker. He has two brothers, Peter Trew a British politician and Robert Trew, an architect.

== Career ==
He obtained a BA in Political Theory from the University of Witwatersrand in 1962. His overt political compromise against apartheid led to his being imprisoned from 1964 to 1965 for collaboration with noted activist Edward Joseph Daniels; at his release he left the country for the United Kingdom, where he continued his studies at the University of Oxford. In 1970 he was appointed a lecturer at the University of East Anglia, where he taught logic, history of science and discourse analysis. He left the university in 1980 to hold a post as director of research at the International Defence and Aid Fund for Southern Africa, where he would remain until 1991; in this position he coordinated research on South Africa, as well as monitoring tasks in collaboration with political dissenters and NGOs. Trew was involved, as representative of the ANC in exile, in talks with concerned white South African's who travelled overseas to talk with the ANC during the mid-eighties until 1990 when the organisation was unbanned. He was part of the ANC representatives that met IDASA at the Dakar Conference in July 1987. Michael Young of Consolidated Goldfields would organise seven meetings known as the Mells Park Initiative between Willie Esterhuyse and his team of politically connected Afrikaners and the ANC's led by Thabo Mbeki of which Trew attended all.

He returned to South Africa in 1991 to work as senior researcher for the African National Congress, and in 1993 he was selected as research coordinator for the Elections Commission of the ANC. A year later he was transferred to the Office of the President as Director of Communications Research, a post he held until 1999. From 2002 he is Deputy CEO at the office of Strategy and Content Management.

== Media ==
He was portrayed by Trevor Sellers in the BBC film Endgame.

== Honours ==
In April 2019, he was awarded the Order of Luthuli by the South African government for "his contribution to the attainment of democracy and to the reconstruction of a post-apartheid society".

== Bibliography ==
- Language and control (1979)
