= Leon Louw =

South African writer (born 1948)

- Louw speaking at a Mont Pelerin Society event in London in 2002.

Personal details
- Born: 18 March 1948 (age 78) Krugersdorp, Transvaal Province, Union of South Africa
- Spouse: Frances Kendall
- Children: Justine Louw; Camilla Louw; Katherine Louw
- Education: UNISA
- Profession: Attorney, activist, executive director

Leon Louw is a South African intellectual, author, speaker and policy advisor. He is the cofounder and former executive director of the Free Market Foundation, a nonprofit organisation. He is a regularly featured speaker and writer in South African and international media. He has addressed many prominent organisations, including the US Congress hearings on apartheid, the King Center for Nonviolent Social Change, the Hoover Institute, and the United Nations.

== Early life ==
Leon Louw was born in the town of Krugersdorp on 18 March 1948 to a conservative Afrikaner family. After his mother died in his infancy, he was raised by relatives in Potchefstroom, where he attended preschool and started primary school. When his father remarried, he was moved to the new family home in Johannesburg where he completed primary school and attended secondary school. After matriculating, he studied law at the University of the Witwatersrand (1965–1968), after which he completed his BJuris (1969–70) degree through the University of South Africa whilst serving legal articles at a law firm.

At university, he became a Marxist and anti-apartheid activist. He studied the major works of Marx and other communist writers. As an activist participating in anti-apartheid demonstrations and underground meetings he often found himself at odds with the law and the police.

== Activism ==
Louw experienced a "philosophical shift" during his early twenties when he was an article clerk at one of South Africa's leading law firms. He saw the police harass and violently arrest an old black woman who was selling fruit on the street. He went to the police station to secure her release but he realized she had probably lost everything she had. The incident led him to reconsider his communist leanings:

I then pondered; I thought, but hold on a sec, if I’m a communist, I don’t want her to be free to trade. It should be banned. Yet, this was such an outrageous, offensive thing to see and it just went against every sinew in my body and that caused me to ponder. And then I thought, well, she’s doing no harm. She should be free to trade with any willing, bypassing consumer. And then I thought, well, you know, is the same true of a bank? Is the same true of Microsoft to multinationals? And I thought, well, why not? Why shouldn’t everyone enjoy precisely the same freedom of enterprise as she should?

Louw asked his employer to investigate the plight of informal black traders and to provide them with legal defence. After telling him that it was "none of their business", his employer reluctantly allowed Louw to work pro bono for illegal street vendors, taxi operators and cottage industries. It was at this point that Louw first found himself questioning Marxism, which he would later abandon, by virtue of what he observed "in the real world", as he puts it, and under the influence of a colleague who introduced him to Ayn Rand's Objectivist philosophy.

In defence of informal traders, Louw began to work with a trade unionist from the National Union of Mineworkers (NUM), Laurence Mavundla, who, like Louw, had been enraged by the notorious "Granny Moyo" incident – she died due to head injuries suffered when tossed into a police van – and other violence perpetrated against what Louw saw as aspirant black capitalists. He teamed up with Mavundla's African Chamber of Hawkers and Informal Businesses (ACHIB), and worked with others in the black community for black taxi operators, peasant farmers and informal contractors. His work entailed representing street vendors in court cases, reclaiming their confiscated merchandise, seeking injunctions against illegal raids, arrests and brutality, confronting and obstructing police who were harassing small enterprise owners, and organising or joining protest action.

In 1977, Louw was the Legal Manager at the Association of Chambers of Commerce of South Africa.

Louw was one of the co-founders of the Free Market Foundation of Southern Africa (FMF) in 1975 and served for many years as its executive director and the face of the organisation. After a "bitter and public split" with the board of directors, he resigned in 2022. In 2023 he formed a new pro-market policy institute, the Freedom Foundation.

In March 1981, Louw said of affirmative action:

"The most offensive aspect of affirmative action is the way it humiliates blacks. It implies that they are inferior, that they are not good enough to handle legal equality with whites. It is the most devious and arrogant form of white pseudo-liberal paternalism."

In the early 1980s, Louw was the Chairman of the Commission of Inquiry into Ciskei Economic Policy.

In 1987, at a conference of the Institute for Democratic Alternatives in South Africa (IDASA) in Port Elizabeth, Louw said that the struggle against apartheid was about winning freedom, not power, for black South Africans, and that whites were concerned that a black government would be coercive. He argued that democracy and economic freedom were interdependent concepts which cannot exist in each other's absence. In the same year, at a symposium in honor of Martin Luther King Jr. in Atlanta, Georgia, Louw said that a peaceful solution to apartheid South Africa's race conflict would be to include blacks in the freedoms whites had until that point enjoyed. Whites, on the other hand, would require security of their already-existing freedoms, against a potentially-vengeful black government. Above all, he said that the solution must include "the abolition of apartheid, full equality before the law and citizenship for all".

Despite Louw's activism he never joined any political organisation. He was involved communicating between exiled structures of the organisation and the underground movement in South Africa. He met regularly with people in other political formations including AZAPO, the Pan Africanist Congress and the Inkatha Freedom Party. He was chairman of one of South Africa's illegal non-racial schools, the Woodmead Montessori Primary School, which was attended inter alia by his children and by Nelson and Winnie Mandela's granddaughter Zoleka, who became a close school friend of Louw's daughter Camilla. Through the school, his activism and one of his books endorsed by Ms. Mandela, he and his wife, Frances Kendall, befriended the Mandela family. They helped Winnie Mandela in her work to support families of detainees and she arranged daily transport from the distant Soweto to their school for her granddaughter and a dozen or so other Soweto children.

Louw met and got to know many South African and foreign intellectuals from politics and business, including Thabo Mbeki, his father Govan Mbeki, Jacob Zuma, F.W. de Klerk, Anton Rupert, Harry Oppenheimer, Clem Sunter, Marinus Wiechers, Sam Motsuenyane (former president of the FMF), Helen Suzman, Alan Paton, Nthato Motlana, Albertina and Walter Sisulu, Mangosuthu Buthelezi, Dirk Hertzog, Jan S. Marais, Andreas Wassenaar, Frederik van Zyl Slabbert, Hendrik Verwoed Jr, Coretta Scott King, Thomas Sowell, Friedrich Hayek, Milton Friedman, James M. Buchanan, Israel Kirzner, Margaret Thatcher, and Walter E. Williams.

== Books ==
Louw co-authored with his wife Frances Kendall two books: South Africa, the Solution (Amagi, 1986) and Let the People Govern (Amagi, 1989). He ghost-wrote a novel set in India, The Deal Maker (2010, Rupa, Delhi), and co-authored Towards Freehold - Options for Land and Development (JUTA, 1988), and McGregor’s Economic Alternatives (JUTA, 1990). He has contributions in many publications, and wrote Habits of Highly Effective Countries (LRP, 2000), which is a statistical and empirical analysis of the characteristics associated with countries considered "winners" and "losers".

== CODESA ==
Louw gave evidence on many occasions to various CODESA and, subsequently, Parliamentary constitutional committees. The FMF's submissions contributed to the devolution of exclusive powers to local and regional tiers of government, the inclusion in the limitation clause of the requirement that limitations of rights must be "justifiable in an open and democratic", and the inclusion of the administrative justice clause (section 32), the freedom of trade clause (section 22), and the rule of law as a justiciable foundational provision in the first section of the Constitution (section 1(c)).

== Influences ==
When asked which prominent thinkers influenced his beliefs and principles the most, Louw lists (chronologically) Ayn Rand, Ludwig von Mises, Murray Rothbard, Friedrich Hayek, Thomas Sowell, Donald Symons, and Matt Ridley.

== Personal life ==
Louw is married to Frances Kendall (1978) and has three daughters, Justine, Camilla and Katherine. His current interests, recreations and hobbies include philosophy, classical music, travel, the outdoors, chess, jogging, cycling and gym.
