= Dakar Conference =

Historic conference of South African affairs

The Dakar Conference (also known as the Dakar Dialogue and the Dakar Initiative) was a historic conference between members of the Institute for Democratic Alternatives in South Africa (IDASA) and the African National Congress (ANC). It was held in Dakar, Senegal between 9 and 12 July 1987. The conference discussed topics such as strategies for bringing fundamental change in South Africa, national unity, structures of the government and the future of the economy in a free South Africa. The IDASA delegation from South Africa, participated in the conference in their private capacity and would later be condemned by the South African government for meeting a banned organization. The future indirect result of the conference was South African government talks with Nelson Mandela and his eventual meeting with P. W. Botha in 1989.

== Background ==
Frederik van Zyl Slabbert, a member of the opposition resigned from the Progressive Federal Party and the South African parliament in January 1986, describing it as irrelevant and that he would explore other avenues of negotiations between white and black South African's. Dr. Alex Boraine would also leave with him. Van Zyl Slabbert and Boraine would the establish The Institute for Democratic Alternatives in South Africa (IDASA), a non-partisan organization that aimed to promote inclusive democracy in South Africa by talking to people of all races within and outside the country. Slabbert, in communication with Thabo Mbeki, member of the ANC National Executive, discussed the change in attitude amongst some of the Afrikaner elite towards Afrikaner Nationalism and Apartheid. Out of these discussions and meetings, an idea was generated for a possible meeting between them and the ANC. This would be a change from the opposition White liberals attempting to force political change from within the parliamentary system, to the Afrikaner elite taking direct action in shaping the future direction of South Africa.

Later in 1986, Slabbert and Breyten Breytenbach met on Gorée Island of Dakar in Senegal and decided that the city should be the location of the conference. One third of the conference's cost was financed by the German Friedrich Naumann Foundation and further support was provided by George Soros, who was nonetheless skeptical that the conference would achieve anything for South Africa. Breytenbach then approached Danielle Mitterrand, the French president's wife who headed the France-Libertés Foundation and who was well acquainted with Abdou Diouf, the Senegalese President, and asked her to intercede with him to allow the South African delegates to enter Senegal and ensure the security of the conference. The African Jurists' Association would also play a role in the conference's organisation. By 3 June 1987, more than a month before the start date, the South African press had caught wind of the proposed conference and published stories about a group of South Africans who were going to have a meeting with the ANC.

The IDASA delegation personally invited by Slabbert consisted of 61 delegates with at least half consisting of Afrikaner academics, teachers, journalists, artists, directors, writers and professionals and the group had Afrikaans speaking Coloureds, ten English-speaking businessmen and academics and three German academics working on South Africa. The South African delegation attended in their private capacity and did not represent the organisations they worked for. The seventeen ANC delegates would be led by Thabo Mbeki in his capacity of ANC Director of Information and four other members of the ANCs National Executive Committee while the other twelve were made up of ANC members based in Zambia, Scandinavia, UK, Ireland, United States and West Africa.

The IDASA delegation flew into Dakar from London and were met at the airport by the Senegalese Head of Protocol in the VIP lounge and then escorted by motorcycle riders to their hotel where the conference would take place and were met there by the ANC delegation. During the conference, the delegates would attend receptions at Presidential Palace and the Minister of Educations residence. The conference began on 9 July and would end on 12 July.

== Conference ==
The conference was opened by President Abdou Diouf and attended by his cabinet and members of the diplomatic community and then an address was given by Danielle Mitterrand. The delegates would then return to their hotel and the conference venue. Four major topics had been agreed upon and the delegates had submitted the papers prior to conference and had been viewed by the ANC and they would respond to them after their presentation. The four major topics included, strategies for bringing fundamental change in South Africa, national unity, structures of the government and the future of the economy in a free South Africa. Informal topics were also discussed and included the armed struggle, violence, negotiations, political pluralism, a Bill of Rights, future of Afrikaans and its culture, a future economy, distributive justice and other topics.

The delegates in their presentation expressed their concern about violence in South Africa and its impact on civilians while the ANC members outlined why they had begun an armed struggle when all other peaceful strategies to bring about racial policy change in South Africa had failed and that attacks on soft targets was not a policy and that control over its armed cadres in the country was not always possible. It was clear to the delegates during the discussions that the ANC was prepared to negotiate with the government but that certain preconditions would have to be met which included the release of political prisoners and the unbanning of banned organisation's in the country.

With regards to pluralism, the ANC expressed a commitment of political pluralism in a new South African political system and that racism and fascism would be outlawed in the political system. It expressed a belief that the groups committed to the ending of Apartheid would in a new South Africa political system would split into its own organizations expressing their own ideas and beliefs.

The ANC in the discussion concerning a Bill of Rights said it did not have a problem with it but would not guarantee privileges in such a bill. It expressed a reassurance that the Afrikaans language would be safeguarded as well as its cultural identity and that all people's cultural heritages should be protected.

Concerning the future South African economy the ANC's policies were still governed by the Freedom Charter and that some form of nationalization would be required to redress the economic and wealth imbalances and that any nationalization would not occur instantly and consultation would take place between business and the future government. Health housing and education were key areas that the ANC would be readdressing.

At the conclusion of the conference, a declaration was released by the participants stating that a negotiated settlement in South Africa was preferred and that main obstacle was the South African government's unwillingness to negotiate, and the delegates concern about the level of uncontrolled violence in the country. A ferry trip was then organized to the Gorée Island and they visited the Maison des Esclaves and its museum in remembrance to the Dutch slave trade in West Africa.

== Known participants ==
=== ANC ===
- Thabo Mbeki
- Kader Asmal
- Selwyn Gross
- Pallo Jordan
- Brigitte Mabandla
- Lindiwe Mabuza
- Penuell Maduna
- Mac Maharaj
- Francis Melli
- Reggie Mbono
- Alfred Nzo
- Tom Sebina
- Essop Pahad
- Albie Sachs
- Tony Trew
- Steve Tshwete

=== IDASA ===
- Frederick Van Zyl Slabbert
- Dr. Alex Boraine
- Professor Andre Du Toit - political scientist University of Stellenbosch
- Professor Jaap Durand - academic
- Jakes Gerwel - academic
- Professor Lourens Du Plessis - University of Potchefstroom
- Abraham Viljoen - brother of Constand Viljoen
- Tommy Bedford - former rugby captain
- Andre Brink - writer
- Breyten Breytenbach - poet
- Leon Louw - director Free Market Foundation
- Lawrence Schlemmer
- Christo Nel
- Theuns Eloff - academic
- Hermann Giliomee
- Riaan de Villiers
- Revel Fox - architect
- Grethe Fox - actress
- Manie van Rensburg - film director
- Max du Preez - journalist

=== Others ===
- Abdou Diouf - Senegalese President
- Boris Rubenovich Asoyan - Soviet Ambassador to Lesotho
- Danielle Mitterrand - Wife of the French President
- Dr. Klaus Baron von der Ropp - German Institute for International and Security Affairs
- Vladimir Igorevich Tikhomirov - Soviet diplomatic expert on Southern African
- Vasily Grigoryevich Solodovnikov - Soviet economist and former Soviet ambassador to Zambia
- Professor Willem van Vuuren
- Hardy Botha (Afrikaans fine artist)

== Conclusion ==
At the end of the conference, the two groups left Senegal on a visit to Burkina Faso and Ghana. Forty South African delegates would return on 21 July 1987 and were met at the airport by a hundred demonstrators from the Afrikaner Resistance Movement (Afrikaner Weerstandsbeweging) led by Eugene Terre Blanche. Posters would accuse the delegates of being traitors, communists and terrorists. No news conference was held by the delegates, having been banned by the police and they were escorted via a back entrance from Jan Smuts International Airport. Frederick Van Zyl Slabbert and Dr. Alex Boraine would return to South Africa on 31 July.

The ruling National Party condemned the talk, worried about the legitimacy the conference gave to the ANC and the government controlled South African Broadcasting Corporation (SABC) and Afrikaner newspapers were critical. English newspapers were said to be critical and lukewarm to the conference. Government officials would express their opinion privately that they thought the conference would hinder the government's own initiates.

In the end, the conference had broken the ice and would make it acceptable for an Afrikaner government to negotiate in the future with the ANC as well as the ANC to understand the Afrikaner. Further meetings were held when South African businessmen met with the ANC, Stellenbosch University students would meet in Lusaka and IDASA would organize further meetings in Germany, United States, France, Zambia and Zimbabwe.
