= Free Market Foundation =

South African think tank

- Founded: August 1975; 51 years ago
- Founder: Leon Louw, FE Emary, M Lillard, Fred Macaskill, André Spies, and Marc Swanepoel
- Type: Policy institute
- Purpose: Economic freedom, classical liberalism
- Location: Bryanston, Johannesburg, South Africa
- Region served: Southern Africa
- Method: submissions, lectures, conferences, op-eds, multimedia, lobbying
- Key people: Chairman Rex van Schalkwyk, CEO David Ansara
- Website: freemarketfoundation.com

The Free Market Foundation (FMF) refers to itself as a classical liberal think tank located in Bryanston, Johannesburg, South Africa. Founded in 1975, the FMF was established to further human rights and democracy through the principles of an open society, the rule of law, personal liberty, and economic liberalism and press freedom. According to The Mercury editor Fikile-Ntsikelelo Moya, the FMF is a "libertarian think tank" wanting "unfettered capitalism" which "eschews all forms of state intervention in the life of the individual citizen". In 1987, Leon Louw, the FMF's co-founder and then-Executive Director, described the work of the foundation as follows:

"We mobilise public opinion, we lobby, we fight government, any government, and make representations and submissions. Our objective is to create a climate of public opinion among politicians, radical groups and unions in favour of free markets."

In 2017 the Think Tanks and Civil Societies Program of the University of Pennsylvania ranked the FMF as the 123rd best think tank in the category "Top Think Tanks Worldwide – (U.S. and non-U.S.)," the 21st best think tank in Sub-Saharan Africa, and the 109th best "independent think tank" in the world, for the year 2016.

From 2012 until May 2014, businessman Herman Mashaba, who was the Executive Mayor of Johannesburg, served as chairman of the foundation's board. He stepped down from his position when he joined the Democratic Alliance as an "ordinary card-carrying member," citing the need for the foundation to remain politically impartial.

After a bitter power struggle over several years, Leon Louw, the face of the foundation for nearly five decades, was ousted from the organisation and resigned in July 2022. Louw said the FMF wanted to be more partisan while he wanted to retain its neutral stance. The executive committee said he refused "to work within the lawful structures of the Foundation and work with its executives."

As of November 2023, David Ansara is the chief executive officer and Rex van Schalkwyk is the chairman of the board.

The FMF is an Atlas Network partner.

== History ==
=== Apartheid era ===
The "South African Free Market Foundation" was founded in August 1975 "to promote free enterprise" in South Africa. The initiative was spearheaded by the Association of Chambers of Commerce of South Africa (Assocom), which sought a way "to promote the free market economy in South Africa". According to the Sunday Express, the FMF was founded by "a group of five young professional men", because "Government [was] progressing inexorably toward a greater degree of control over traditional free market forces." Leon Louw led the steering committee responsible for the establishment of the foundation. The steering committee consisted of Louw, FE Emary, M Lillard, Fred Macaskill, André Spies and Marc Swanepoel". When asked about its view of South Africa's apartheid policies, the first chairman of the FMF, Lu Sher (who was President of Assocom), said that the FMF "would like to see restrictions on the movement and use of labour, capital, and goods, phased out wherever possible". Sher continued, saying the FMF was generally "limiting [itself] to the economic field, but there we believe that the fewer restrictions the better, and that all races should be able to compete freely in all sectors".

The foundation published a monthly classical liberal magazine, The Individualist, from its founding in 1975 until October 1976, when the FMF was officially registered as a non-profit organisation in South Africa. The magazine was from then on published independently. The Individualist is currently defunct. The FMF would later publish its own journal, Free Market, which was released six times a year. Senator Owen Horwood (Minister of Finance) and Gerhard de Kock (Governor of the Reserve Bank) were among its contributors. Free Market is also currently defunct.

In May 1976, the FMF moved offices to 401 City Centre, 36 Joubert Street, Johannesburg.

In November 1976, after the FMF's registration as an NPO, it was reformed into the "Free Market Foundation (Southern Africa)". Dirk Hertzog, Chairman of the Oude Meester Group and President of the South African Society of Marketers, was chosen as chairman of FMF's interim executive committee. By this time, the FMF "had the backing" of Assocom, SASOM, the South African Federated Chamber of Industries (SAFCI), the National African Federation Chamber of Commerce (NAFCOC), and the Afrikaanse Handelsinstituut (AHI). The Clarion magazine also "[pledged] its full support to the whole concept" of the FMF.

At its inaugural congress in 1977, Professor Stephan du Toit Viljoen, Chairman of the Bantu Investment Corporation and the Bank of Lisbon (today Mercantile Bank), was elected as the FMF's first president. In his inaugural address, Du Toit Viljoen claimed that the cause for the unrest throughout South Africa was because black South Africans could not identify with the political and economic system in which they lived. According to Du Toit Viljoen, it was necessary to involve all of South Africa's races in the development of the free enterprise system, to avoid this unrest. To this end, Du Toit Viljoen called for the progressive removal of discriminatory laws, improving education facilities, and improving the quality of life by providing home ownership; and that "the gradually increasing involvement of all races in the administration of the country would be an essential corresponding development in the political field". At the time, André Spies was the secretary of the FMF.

In March and April 1978, the FMF and the School of Business Leadership at the University of South Africa hosted Friedrich A. Hayek, the Nobel Prize-winning economist, on a visit to South Africa. Hayek addressed a public meeting at the Carlton Hotel on Wednesday, 22 March, on social justice and economics. The Johannesburg Chamber of Commerce held a lunch for Hayek on Thursday, 6 April, at the hotel. At a banquet on Friday, 7 April, at the same hotel, Senator Horwood was the main speaker.

The FMF criticized the South African government's 1980 budget, especially the "increased welfare spending including subsidies and housing". Howard Preece, an editor of the Rand Daily Mail, responded to this criticism, sarcastically remarking that "there will be all those black pensioners whooping it up on their R33 a month while the oppressed whites slave to provide cheap bread for the blacks generally". The editor concluded that "[c]ommunists never had better friends than these ultra-marketeers and their Standard Nine [eleventh grade] economics".

Eustace Davie became a director of the FMF in 1981.

Professor Jan A. Lombard, Head of the Department of Economics at the University of Pretoria and Deputy Governor of the SA Reserve Bank, was President of the FMF between 1981 and at least 1991.

Louw and Frances Kendall, his wife, wrote the bestselling book South Africa: The Solution in 1986, which put forward a vision for direct democracy broadly based on the Swiss canton system. The book sold over 25,000 copies and was translated into Afrikaans.

By 1987, much of the FMF's funding came "from large corporations, with lesser contributions coming from individuals and smaller companies". The FMF also earned an income from consulting work for companies seeking to overcome government interventions that inhibit their enterprises, and advising government institutions and homeland governments, especially on deregulation and privatization. Its With Justice For All training program, aimed at teaching "economic principles and also covers politics", which ended in 1988, accounted for 60% of the FMF's total income. The Rand Mines Group sent 100,000 of its staff to participate in With Justice For All. Don King, the group's personnel director, said the program would "tell workers of the benefits of the free market system as the viable and more welcome alternative to the marxist-socialist system".

At the time, the FMF argued that privatization was the only way to bring about racial equality between black and white South Africans. Louw said that, in addition to producing enough wealth to raise the welfare of blacks, privatizing South Africa's state-owned enterprises and industries would depoliticize various economic sectors, like buses and trains, which had been racialized whilst in state hands. Resistance from civil servants and the possibility of generating private monopolies were two issues Louw identified, but this could be overcome by guaranteeing job security and ensuring privatized enterprises are not given to one firm.

In 1988, the FMF awarded Lawrence Mavundla with its "Free Market Award" for his contribution to the cause of economic freedom in South Africa. Mavundla had co-founded the Co-Operative for Hawkers and Informal Business in 1986 to fight for the right to enterprise of black South Africans during the time of the apartheid regime's discriminatory legislation.

=== Post-apartheid ===
The FMF was an active participant in both the negotiations to end apartheid in South Africa (notably, the Dakar Conference of 1987) as well as the negotiations surrounding what the provisions of the Constitution of South Africa, 1996 would be.

The FMF opposed the inclusion of section 8(2) of the Constitution, which provides that the rights in the Bill of Rights do not only bind government, but also citizens (so-called "horizontality"). The FMF further protested the inclusion of "public interest" as a justification for the expropriation of private property, currently found in section 25(2)(a) of the Constitution. Public interest, it argued, is wide and leads to uncertainty, making it "not only open to abuse, but deprives the courts of clear principles on which to adjudicate property rights disputes". The FMF also opposed including socio-economic rights, such as the right to access to housing (section 26) and the right to access healthcare, food, water, and social security (section 27), because, firstly, it argued the South African government did not have the resources to give effect to these rights, secondly, that 'right to have access' is "jurisprudentially vague", and thirdly, socio-economic rights were "unprecedented" in South African law, meaning the courts of South Africa would need "to decide whether measures that confer 'access' to targeted benefits are sufficiently 'reasonable' and 'progressive' and what the state's 'available resources' are, which means judges may have to determine levels of taxation; budget deficits and allocations; housing, health et al policies..."

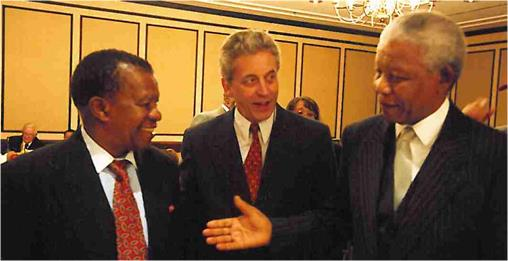
The "Free Market Award" 2000 ceremony. From left to right: Ketumile Masire, Leon Louw and Nelson Mandela.

Professor Themba Sono, who was the President of the South African Students' Organisation between 1971 and 1972 and a co-founder of the Black People's Convention, was President of the FMF from 1997 to 2000.

In 2000, the FMF awarded its "Free Market Award" to Sir Ketumile Masire, the former President of Botswana (1980-1998), with FMF chairman, Michael O'Dowd, saying "Botswana maintained all the institutions and practices which constitute a free market economy." The award ceremony was attended by the former South African president, Nelson Mandela.

The FMF came out in opposition to the South African government's decision to expand South Africa's nuclear energy capacity in 2014, with executive director, Leon Louw, saying, "The government has shown conclusively that it is unable to manage electricity. It is entirely in the wrong hands." Louw, however, expressed approval of nuclear power in principle.

Between 2013 and 2016 the FMF attempted to have section 23 of South Africa's Labour Relations Act, 1995 changed. The section "allows the minister of labour to extend a collective agreement concluded in the bargaining council to any non-parties to the collective agreement that are within its registered scope". The FMF's argument was that this section was detrimental to small businesses "which could not afford wage agreements reached in councils they are not affiliated with". In Free Market Foundation v Minister of Labour and Others 2016 (4) SA 496 (GP), Murphy J of the Pretoria High Court found against the FMF, holding that the section need not be changed and that the Promotion of Administrative Justice Act, 2000 provided sufficient protection for small businesses wishing to review the labour minister's extension of agreements.

In 2017, the FMF opposed the South African Department of Justice and Constitutional Development's Prevention and Combating of Hate Crimes and Hate Speech Bill, 2016, arguing that the "right to free, uncensored communication was the foundation of a truly democratic society." The FMF also argued that the Bill falls foul of the section 16 protection of freedom of expression found in the Constitution. When the Bill was updated in April 2018, the FMF welcomed the changes but continued to argue that the Bill was unnecessary.

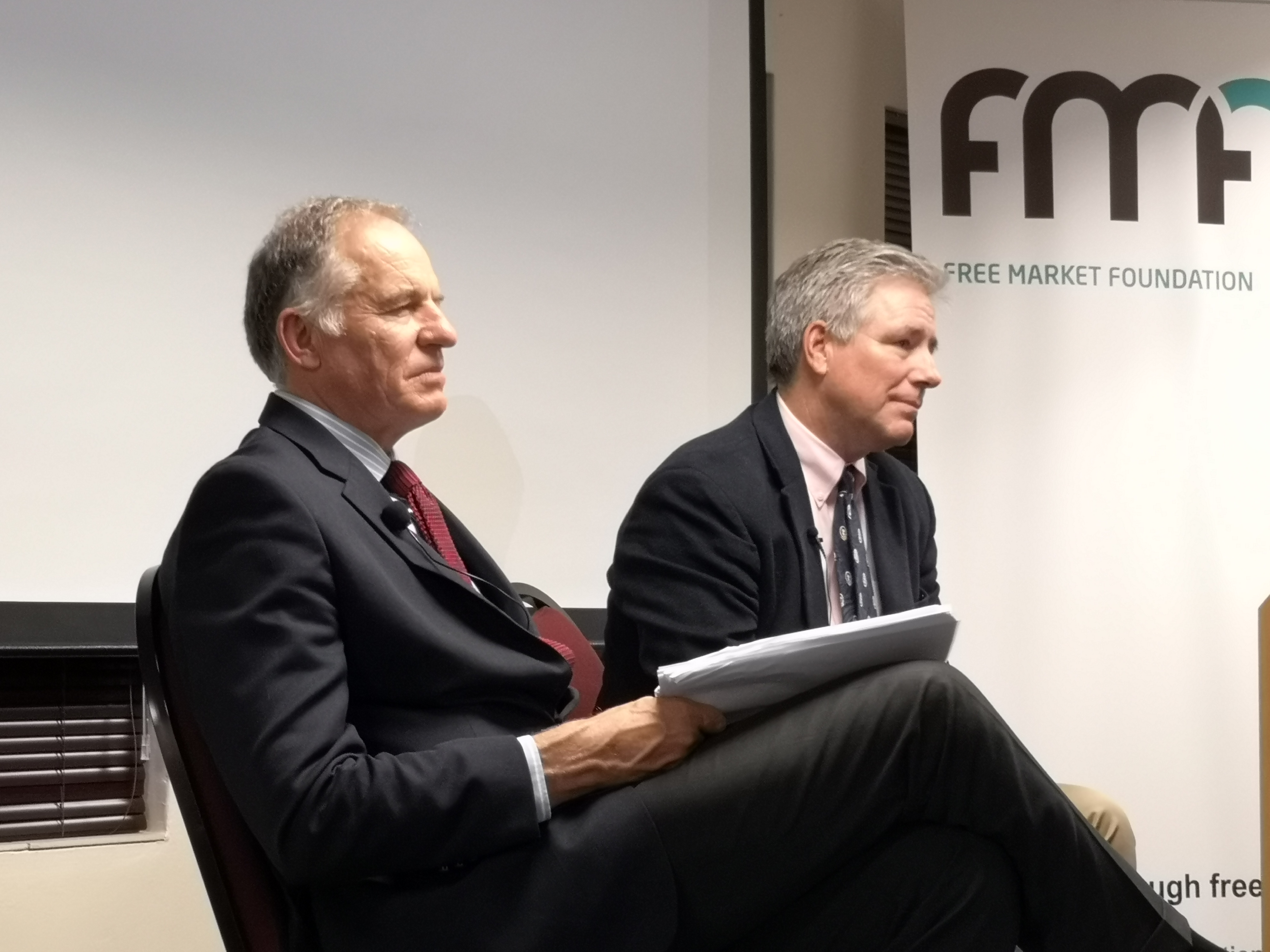
Frans Rautenbach (left) and Daniel J. Mitchell (right) speaking at the FMF on the Rule of Law on 14 November 2018.

The FMF has opposed the South African government's plan to amend section 25 of the Constitution to enable the expropriation of private property without compensation. Nolutshungu warned that expropriation without compensation would betray the victory of constitutional democracy over such legislation as the Natives Land Act, 1913, and said that even though the current government might not wish to use the power to expropriate without compensation maliciously, the nature of constitutional change means any future government will have the same power. Professor Robert Vivian, who sits on the FMF's Rule of Law Board of Advisors, said in September 2018 that, contrary to the conventional belief that only two-thirds of the members of the National Assembly would need to support the amendment for it to pass into law, 75% of the assembly's votes would instead be necessary. This is because according to Vivian, amending the requirement to pay compensation for expropriated property does not simply affect section 25 of the Constitution (in the Bill of Rights), but also affects section 1's (in the Founding Provisions) commitment to the advancement of human rights and freedoms. Provisions in the Bill of Rights require two-thirds of the assembly, and provisions in section 1 require 75%.

The FMF has also voiced its concern over the public participation process surrounding the adoption of the expropriation without compensation policy. It pointed out that the government had allocated more time for written submissions on a tobacco regulation bill than it did for the constitutional amendment. Later, the FMF condemned Parliament for not inviting the foundation to participate in the oral hearings before the National Assembly's constitutional review committee.

== Activities ==
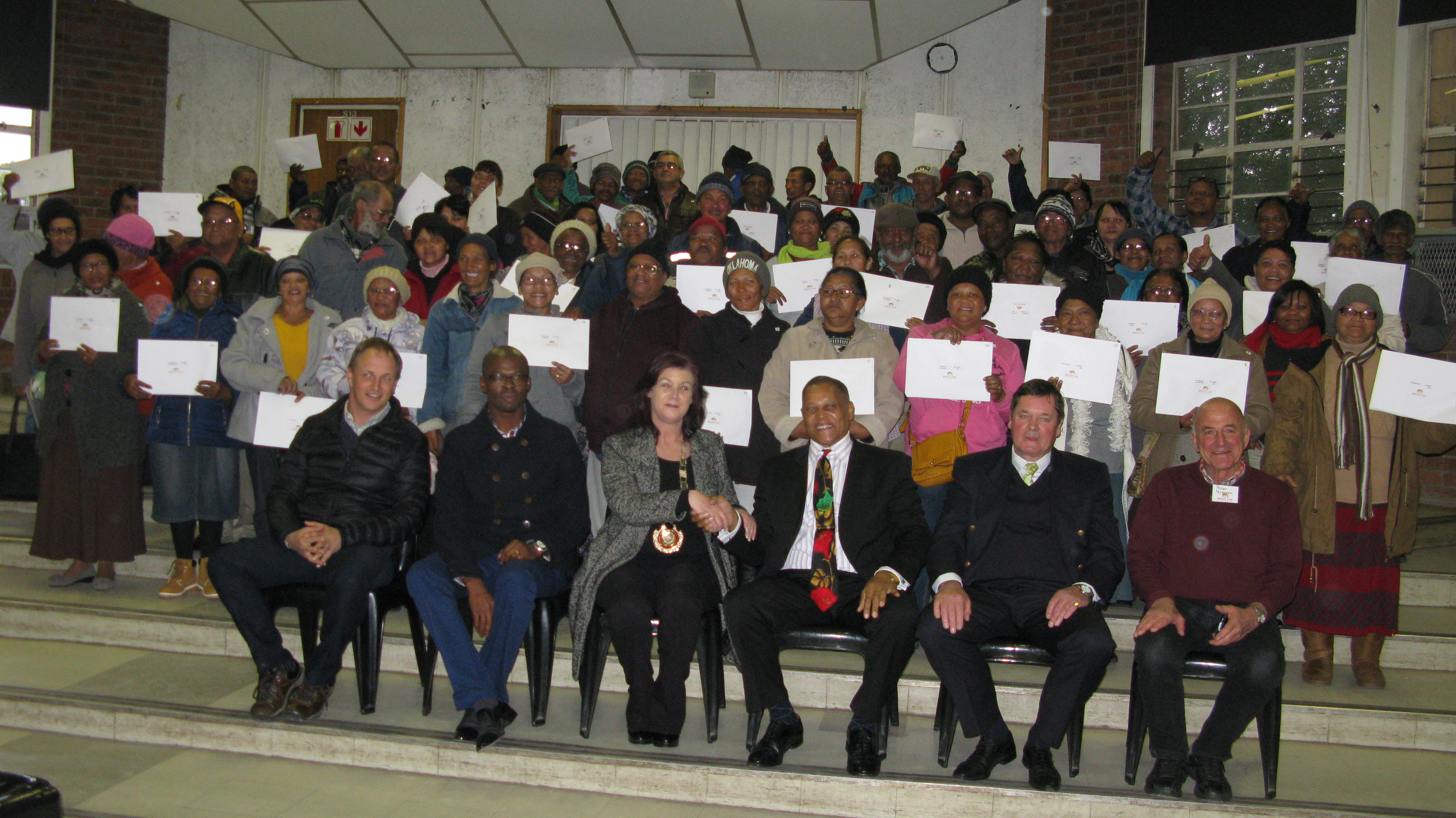
Khaya Lam title deed giveaway ceremony in Grabouw, Western Cape on 25 July 2017. Seated in the front, left to right: Attie van Wyk (CEO of Two-a-Day), Isaac Sileku (Deputy Mayor of the Theewaterskloof Municipality), Christelle Vosloo (Mayor), Temba Nolutshungu (FMF director), Derek Corder (Trustee of the Elgin Foundation), and Perry Feldman (Khaya Lam project manager).

=== Khaya Lam Land Reform Project ===
Since 2013, the FMF have led a land reform initiative with First National Bank (FNB) originally called the Ngwathe Land Reform Project. FNB executive Simphiwe Madikizela explained: “When you release title deeds wealth is created for the community. Once people have the title deed, they can extend property and make a living off the property by renting the rooms. They can use their home as collateral to get loans for other personal purposes.”

The project is now called the Khaya Lam Land Reform Project. Its stated mission is assist communities in the conversion of their apartheid-era leasehold title (tenancy) to freehold title (ownership). Khaya Lam is Xhosa for "My Home." The project makes use of the Upgrading of Land Tenure Rights Act (112 of 1991), or 'ULTRA', which "places an obligation on councils to transfer municipal land to tenants".

On 25 July 2017, the FMF handed over 58 title deeds in Grabouw in the Theewaterskloof Local Municipality of the Western Cape, which were sponsored by the Two-a-Day Group (Pty) Ltd and the Elgin Foundation. FMF director Temba Nolutshungu acted as master of ceremonies, and was accompanied by the Project Manager of the Khaya Lam Land Reform Project, Perry Feldman.

On 16 January 2018, the FMF handed over 117 title deeds to beneficiaries from Kylemore‚ Le Roux‚ Cloetesville‚ Khayamandi and Franschhoek, at the Stellenbosch Town Hall. Businessman Johann Rupert sponsored the deeds, which are intended to be the first of 1,000. In thanking Rupert for the sponsorship, FMF executive director Leon Louw criticized government for failing to systematically convert "‘council owned’ and ‘traditional community’ properties to full‚ unrestricted ownership".

The FMF has expanded the title deeds initiative to large parts of the Eastern Cape and KwaZulu-Natal.

=== Civil aviation and South African Airways ===
The FMF has favored deregulation of civil aviation in South Africa since at least 1980. One of its chief aims was to have South African Airways (SAA) denied the power to prohibit potential competitors in the airline industry entry, a power granted to SAA by the Air Services Act (51 of 1949). Terry J. Markman argued that the Act should be repealed and domestic civil aviation "should be deregulated immediately" and that SAA should be denationalised and required to make a profit. The Air Services Act was repealed by the International Air Services Act (60 of 1993) during a time of liberalization in South Africa. Markman, a transportation consultant, often represented the FMF in public on this topic. Markman blamed the government's intervention in the finances of Union Airways (subsequently becoming SAA) in 1933 as the cause of South Africa's heavily-regulated civil aviation industry.

As of 2017, the FMF has been involved in a campaign to have SAA either privatized or liquidated in the wake of billions of rands in bailouts and guarantees being granted to the airline by government, arguing that the continued financing of the airline is a subsidy by the poor in favor of the rich. The FMF however believes that it may be too late for privatization given the state of SAA's finances.

In early June 2018, Louw publicly challenged SAA chief executive officer, Vuyani Jarana, to a wager of R100,000 ($7,440) that SAA would not be profitable within the period Jarana claimed it would. In terms of the wager, if SAA is not profitable by 31 March 2021, Jarana would have to pay R100,000 to a charity of Louw's choice, and if SAA is profitable, Louw would have to pay the money to a charity of Jarana's choice. Jarana agreed to the wager. By 22 June, however, Peter Davies, the airline's chief restructuring officer, told the Financial Mail, "It will take us five years until 2022 to break even", a timeline apparently approved by SAA's board and by the National Treasury; casting doubts on whether the terms of the wager would be adhered to. On 31 March 2021 however, Jarana conceded the wager as a "technical knockout" and made the relevant donation to Louw's Khaya Lam charity.

=== Economic Freedom of the World report ===
The Free Market Foundation publishes the South African edition of the Fraser Institute's annual Economic Freedom of the World report. The FMF is listed as a "full member" in this partnership with the Fraser Institute. FMF director Temba Nolutshungu said for the 2016 edition that it "is tragic that a country ranked 42nd in the world in 2000, just outside the top 25% of countries in the world, should have fallen 63 places in the rankings in 15 years to a point where it now ranks in the bottom 35%." According to Nolutshungu, research shows that "there is a significant though not immediate correlation between economic freedom, economic growth and human welfare so a steady and dramatic decline in economic freedom in the country should not be taken lightly".

=== Enterprise Africa! ===
Between 2006 and 2010, the FMF, the Mercatus Center at George Mason University, Virginia, and the Institute of Economic Affairs, London, ran the Enterprise Africa! initiative. Supported by a grant from the John Templeton Foundation, the project investigated, analyzed, and reported on enterprise-based solutions to poverty in Africa.

Most of the studies and analyses were all written primarily by Mercatus Senior Fellow Karol Boudreaux.

=== Health policy ===
The FMF's health policy unit has opposed the South African government's attempts at introducing single-payer national health insurance, arguing that with South Africa's narrow tax base and low economic growth, such a scheme would be unaffordable. Economist and FMF director, Jasson Urbach, has argued that South Africa spends as much on healthcare as is "equal to many developed economies' health expenditure as a proportion of GDP," and said that spending more will not solve the problem of a "dysfunctional" system.

=== Minimum wage ===
The FMF has long opposed the introduction of a national minimum wage, claiming that it would be harmful for South Africa's large number of unemployed people. According to former FMF board chairman Herman Mashaba, "a minimum wage makes it illegal to employ anyone for a lower wage. The result is that many people are denied the right to decide for themselves about job opportunities". FMF director Jasson Urbach has claimed that large businesses tend to support minimum wage laws because "it protects them from competition from small businesses".

In February 2017 the South African government resolved to adopt a national minimum wage by 1 May 2018, at R20 ($1.50) per hour, or roughly R3,500 ($261.52) per month. A commission will be set up to review the wage level annually.

Louw has argued that if a minimum wage is implemented, government must create "job seekers' exemption certificates" (JSEC) which would allow individuals who have been unemployed for an extended period of time to exempt themselves from the application of the minimum wage, in order to find employment below the minimum wage. FMF director Eustace Davie authored Jobs for the Jobless in 2003, which set out the comprehensive JSEC proposal. The Atlas Network awarded the FMF the "Templeton Freedom Award" in 2009 for the book.

== Funding ==
Although it has claimed to primarily represent the interests of small business, the FMF appears to have received most of its funding from large corporations in the form of 'corporate members', with the organisation offering different tiers of corporate membership.

== Criticism ==
The trade union SAMWU has accused the FMF of being against South Africa's collective bargaining system, likely referring to the FMF's 2013-16 attempt to have a provision of the Labour Relations Act changed. Irwin Jim, general secretary of NUMSA, has similarly accused the FMF, writing, "The FMF's attack on collective bargaining is based on its devotion to the neoliberal capitalist perspective and is part of a broader campaign to defend the neoliberal orientation of the ANC government". In March 2018, journalist Eusebius McKaiser referred to the FMF as "libertarians who care little for group identities, structural analysis and protection of workers at the mercy of amoral labour markets".

Kate Wilkinson, senior researcher at Africa Check (an organization founded "to promote accuracy in public debate and the media in Africa") criticized and debunked some of the FMF's claims about transformation in South Africa in 2015. Louw wrote two columns in Business Day, the first on 26 August 2015, "SA's bizarre transformation denialism", and the second on 4 November 2015, "Transformation denialism is an extreme form of racism". Of Louw's five claims in the first column, two were "unproven" and three were "incorrect". Of Louw's fourteen claims in the second column, five were "incorrect", three were "unproven", two were "unable to verify", three were "mostly correct" and one was "correct". Wilkinson criticized the FMF for the long delay in providing her with sources for the claims, and when provided, for the quality of the sources. She accused the FMF of providing no primary sources and doing "horse-before-the-cart research", by making claims first and looking for evidence after.

In January 2018, researchers from the Institute for African Alternatives criticized the FMF for its response to Oxfam's 2018 report. Among other things, the FMF claimed that the poor were empowered by free enterprise, a claim the researchers said "is made repeatedly by the foundation and conservative economic commentators in South Africa". In contrast, the researchers say that liberalization in Africa has failed where it has been tried. Where the FMF claimed that wealth generation is legitimate if coercion was not used to accrue that wealth, the researchers argue that in a market economy, "one is compelled to sell one's labour in order to survive". The researchers conclude that the FMF's rejection of the Oxfam report is on "flimsy grounds" and that "Oxfam should be praised for continuously alerting the global public to the threat that rising inequality poses to social and political stability".

== Leadership ==
Directors

As of 2023, the directors include:

- David Ansara (Executive Director and CEO)
- Martin Van Staden (Executive Director and Head of Policy)
- Eustace Davie
- Temba Nolutshungu

Honorary Life Vice President

- Dr. Sam Motsuenyane

Presidents

- Prof. SP du Toit Viljoen: 1977–1981
- Prof. Jan A. Lombard: 1981– ~1991
- Prof. Themba Sono: 1997–2000
- Leon Louw: 2020 - 2022

Chairmen

- Dirk Hertzog (Chairman: Executive Committee): 1976–????
- Lu Sher: 1977–1978
- Michael C. O'Dowd:1978–2005
- Dr. Brian Benfield: ????–2012
- Herman Mashaba: 2012–2014
- Ayanda Khumalo: ?-2019
- Rex van Schalkwyk: 2020 - present

Board

As of 2023, the FMF Board consists of:

- Gail Daus-Van Wyk
- Dawie Roodt
- Wilhelm Hertzog
- Chris Hattingh
- Terry Markman
- Unathi Kwaza

Academic advisors

As of 2018, the FMF had the following people as academic advisors:

- Prof. Brian Kantor
- Prof. Charles W. Baird
- Prof. Deepak Lal
- Prof. Duncan Reekie
- Prof. Israel Kirzner
- Prof. Pascal Salin
- Prof. Patrick Minford

Rule of Law Board of Advisors

As of 2018, the FMF's Rule of Law Project's Board of Advisors consisted of the following:

- Judge (Ret.) Rex van Schalkwyk (Chairman)
- Judge Douglas H. Ginsburg
- Adv. Norman M. Davis SC
- Adv. Greta Engelbrecht
- Adv. Frans Rautenbach
- Prof. Richard Epstein
- Prof. Robert Vivian
- Candice Pillay
- Jonathan Goldberg

== Awards ==
- 2009: The FMF was awarded the "Templeton Freedom Award" by the Atlas Network for its book Jobs for the Jobless.
- 2017: The FMF was awarded the "Africa Liberty Award" by the Atlas Network for its Khaya Lam Land Reform Project.
- 2017: The FMF was awarded the "Impumelelo Social Innovations Award" by the Impumelelo Social Innovations Centre for its Khaya Lam Land Reform Project.

== Publications ==
=== Papers ===
- "Law and the Market" by John Hospers (1985)
- "The Final Constitution for the Republic of South Africa: A Critique of the Interim Constitution" (FMF Occasional Paper No. 1) by Bruce Fein (September 1995)
- "New Zealand's Remarkable Reforms" (FMF Occasional Paper No. 2) by Don Brash (1996)
- "Diamonds: The Competitive Cartel" (FMF Occasional Paper No. 3) by Prof. Duncan Reekie (June 1999)
- "Liberal Reflections" (FMF Occasional Paper No. 4) by Michael O'Dowd (December 1999)
- "Smoked Out: Anti-Tobacco Activism at the World Bank" (FMF Occasional Paper No. 6) by Richard Tren and Hugh High (August 2000)
- "Cartels, spontaneous price discrimination and international pharmacy retailing" (FMF Occasional Paper No. 9) by Prof. Duncan Reekie (August 2001)
- "Undermining mineral rights: An international comparison" (FMF Occasional Paper No. 10) by Johan Biermann (December 2001)
- "Capital gains taxation and its applicability to South Africa" (FMF Occasional Paper No. 12) by Roger Baxter (October 2002)
- "The real reason for the fall of the rand" (FMF Occasional Paper No. 13) by Dr. Richard Grant (November 2002)
- "Innovation, Information & the Poverty of Nations" (FMF Occasional Paper No. 15) by Prof. Robert Cooter (October 2006)
- "Constitutionality of South Africa's competition policy" by Prof. Robert Vivian (September 2011)
- "A Guide to Laws and Regulations Affecting Cloud Computing in South Africa" by Terence Davie (June 2013)
- "An Analysis of the Principle of Public Participation in Policy-Making, including Socio-Economic Impact Assessments, and their Application in South Africa" by Martin van Staden (March 2017)
- "The market for jobs in South Africa – why it performs so poorly and what can be done to improve it" Archived 2017-12-01 at the Wayback Machine by Prof. Brian Kantor (October 2017)

=== Books & monographs ===
- The Fallacy of National Control by Dr. Richard Grant (1991)
- Exchange Controls Must Go by Dr. Richard Grant (1992)
- The Social Market Trap: The Destructive Illusions of Social Democracy by Prof. Christopher Lingle (1992)
- The Importance of Political Traditions by Prof. Leonard Liggio (1992)
- The Environment: Rights and Freedom by Prof. Christopher Lingle (1992)
- Affirmative Action, Apartheid and Capitalism by Jim Peron (1992)
- On industrial policy by Prof. Duncan Reekie (1992)
- Damage by Debt by Symond Fiske (August 1995)
- Health-care options for South Africa: Lessons from the UK and USA by Prof. Duncan Reekie (1995)
- The world revolution in economic policy 1945–1995 Archived 2018-05-25 at the Wayback Machine (FMF Monograph No. 11) by Michael O'Dowd (1996)
- The Urban Housing Issue (FMF Monograph No. 12) by David Dewar (1996)
- The O'Dowd Thesis and the Triumph of Democratic Capitalism by Michael O'Dowd (1996)
- Equality for the labour market: An appreciation of WH Hutt (FMF Monograph No. 13) by Prof. Charles Baird (1996)
- Monopoly and competition policy (FMF Monograph No. 14) by Prof. Duncan Reekie (1996)
- Is privatisation a public good? A review of recent literature (FMF Monograph No. 15) by Candice Perlmann and Prof. Harry Zarenda (1997)
- Industrial policy: A critique (FMF Monograph No. 16) by Prof. Duncan Reekie (1997)
- Labour markets and economic growth: Lessons from the UK (FMF Monograph No. 17) by Prof. Patrick Minford (1998)
- Chronically large federal budget deficits: The American experience (FMF Monograph No. 18) by Prof. Roger Garrison (1998)
- Unjustifiable dismissal – The economics of an unjust employment tax: The New Zealand Employment Contracts Act (FMF Monograph No. 19) by Prof. Charles Baird (1998)
- South Africa as an “Open Society”? Archived 2018-05-25 at the Wayback Machine (FMF Monograph No. 20) by Michael O'Dowd (1998)
- Privatisation: A UK success story (FMF Monograph No. 21) by Thomas O’Malley (1998)
- The Meat Board "carve-up" (FMF Monograph No. 22) by Nils Dittmer (1998)
- Real Money by Dr. Richard Grant (1999)
- Capital structure and the business cycle (FMF Monograph No. 23) by Pierre le Roux (1999)
- Monopoly and competition policy (FMF Monograph No. 24) by Prof. Duncan Reekie (April 2000, 2nd ed.)
- Deregulation of agricultural marketing in South Africa: Lessons learned (FMF Monograph No. 25) by Prof. Nick Vink and Prof. Johann Kirsten (May 2000)
- Smoke gets in your eyes: The economic welfare effects of the World Bank-World Health Organisation global crusade against tobacco (FMF Monograph No. 26) by Prof. Deepak Lal (May 2000)
- Money, central banking and monetary policy in the global financial arena (FMF Monograph No. 27) by Dr. Jerry Jordan (2001)
- Capital Gains Tax: The pros and cons (FMF Monograph No. 28) by Olimpia Staszczuk (June 2001)
- Gold, the euro, the dollar and the rand (FMF Monograph No. 29) by Dr. Richard Grant (June 2001)
- Investment, employment and South African labour laws: An international comparison (FMF Monograph No. 30) by Prof. W.S. Siebert (August 2001)
- Growth Theories and their Application to the Beloved Country (FMF Monograph No. 31) by Henry Kenney (2001)
- Ideal matter: Globalisation and the intellectual property debate (FMF Monograph No. 32) by Julian Morris, Rosalind Mowatt, and Prof. Duncan Reekie (November 2001)
- The Calculus of Consent and Madisonian democracy (FMF Monograph No. 33) by Henry Kenney (May 2002)
- Misguided virtue: False notions of corporate social responsibility (FMF Monograph No. 34) by Prof. David Henderson (September 2002)
- Prejudice is free, but discrimination has costs: The holocaust and its parallels (FMF Monograph No. 35) by Dr. Steven Farron (October 2002)
- Jobs for the Jobless: Job seekers exemption certificates for the unemployed Archived 2017-06-07 at the Wayback Machine by Eustace Davie (December 2003)
- The real digital divide: Convergence and South Africa's telecommunications and broadcasting policy (FMF Monograph No. 36) by Neil Emerick (August 2003)
- The deconstruction of privatisation: A wake up call for South Africa (FMF Monograph No. 37) by Prof. Zane Spindler (March 2004)
- Globalisation and economic growth: Evidence from emerging market economies and South Africa (FMF Monograph No. 38) by Prof. Elsabé Loots (May 2004)
- Military expenditure in Sub-Saharan Africa: Why guns cost more than butter (FMF Monograph No. 39) by Prof. Geoff Harris (November 2004)
- Is central banking the best monetary regime for South Africa? (FMF Monograph No. 40) by Maureen Bader and Prof. Zane Spindler (July 2005)
- Unchain the child: Abolish compulsory schooling laws by Eustace Davie (September 2005)
- Paying for Intervention! How statutory intervention harms South African health care Archived 2017-08-11 at the Wayback Machine by Jasson Urbach (September 2009)
- Nationalisation by Temba Nolutshungu (ed.), Leon Louw, Dr. Richard Grant, Eustace Davie, Jasson Urbach, and Vivian Atud (January 2011, 1st ed. and June 2011, 2nd ed.)
- Jobs Jobs Jobs Archived 2017-06-08 at the Wayback Machine by Temba Nolutshungu (ed.), Richard Pike, Loane Sharp, Leon Louw, Eustace Davie, Lawrence Mavundla, Michael Bagraim, Ann Bernstein, Martin Brassey SC, Prof. Darma Mahadea, Dr. Richard Simson, Vivian Atud, Graham Giles, and Daan Groeneveldt (November 2011)
- The Economic Impact of Cloud Computing in South Africa by Mike Schüssler and Jasson Urbach (June 2013)
- The Regulatory Environment Affecting Cloud Computing in South Africa by Gary Moore (June 2013)
- The Real Digital Divide: South Africa's Information and Communication Technologies Policy Archived 2020-08-06 at the Wayback Machine by Martin van Staden and Neil Emerick (March 2017)
