= Trews (disambiguation) =

Trews are men's clothing for the legs and lower abdomen, a traditional form of tartan trousers from Scottish Highland dress.

Trews may also refer to:

- The Trews, a Canadian band, active from 1997
  - The Trews (album), 2014
- The Trews (web series), by English comedian, actor and activist Russell Brand, from 2014

== See also ==
- Trew, a surname
