= Alex Boraine =

South African politician (1931–2018)

Deputy Chairman of the Truth and Reconciliation Commission
- In office 1996–2003
- President: Nelson Mandela (founder)
- Leader: Archbishop Desmond Tutu (chairman)

Personal details
- Born: 10 January 1931 Cape Town, South Africa
- Died: 5 December 2018 (aged 87) Cape Town, South Africa
- Education: Rhodes University; University of Oxford; Drew University
- Known for: IDASA Truth and Reconciliation Commission

Alexander Lionel Boraine (10 January 1931 – 5 December 2018) was a South African politician, minister, and anti-apartheid activist.

== Early life ==
Alex Boraine was born in Cape Town and grew up in a poor white housing estate. He would leave high school in Standard 8, two years before matric and started working as a ledger clerk. He hadn't told his parents about his decision. As a member of the Methodist Church, he became a lay preacher in 1950.

== Education and early career ==
At 23, he studied at Rhodes University in South Africa where he obtained a Bachelor of Arts degree in Theology and Biblical Studies in 1956. Having been ordained as a Methodist minister in 1956 and his first position was in Pondoland East. After being sponsored by rich Methodists, Boraine attended Mansfield College at Oxford University in England and obtained a Master of Arts in 1962. A further scholarship saw him attend Drew University in the United States where he obtained his PhD in Systematic Theology and Biblical Studies during 1966. In 1970, he was appointed youngest-ever President of the Methodist Church of Southern Africa, a position he held until 1972. As the head of the Church at the "height of apartheid", he took a stand that the Church "should be multiracial." During his time as President of the church, he visited mine compounds and began to criticise the working and living conditions of black miners. In 1972 he was invited to join Anglo American by Harry Oppenheimer to implement changes to the working and living conditions of its black employees as an Employment Practices Consultant, a position he held for two years.

== Politics ==
Boraine was asked to stand in 1974 South African general election and was elected to parliament as an MP for the Progressive Party in the Pinelands constituency, won by only 34 votes. He resigned in 1986 together with Frederik van Zyl Slabbert, believing that the South African parliament was not relevant in establishing a non-racial South African society. The two men founded IDASA, which organized the 1987 Dakar Conference with ANC leaders in Dakar, Senegal. From 1986 to 1995, Boraine headed two South African nonprofit organizations concerned with ending apartheid and addressing the legacy it left behind.

Boraine was one of the main architects of South Africa's Truth and Reconciliation Commission (TRC). He was involved in drafting the Promotion of National Unity and Reconciliation Act, No. 34 of 1995. In 1995, he was appointed by President Nelson Mandela to be its deputy chair of the TRC serving under Chairman Archbishop Desmond Tutu from 1996 to 1998. From 1998 until early 2001, he served as professor of law at New York University and as director of the New York University Law School's Justice in Transition program. In 2001 Boraine co-founded the International Center for Transitional Justice, an international human rights NGO. He served as ICTJ's president for three years, and subsequently, the chairperson of ICTJ's South Africa office. Alex Boraine travelled to many countries that were in transition from dictatorship to democracy, at the invitation of governments and NGOs, to share the South African experience. Boraine was a member of the advisory board of Directors and a Global Visiting professor of law at the NYU School of Law's Hauser Global Law School Program. He published five books, including A Country Unmasked, published by Oxford University Press in November 2000, and A Life in Transition, published by Struik Publishers in June 2008.

== Awards ==
Boraine was awarded the Order of the Baobab in 2014. Other awards include the 2000 honour from Italy, the President's Medal for Human Rights.

== Death ==
He survived prostate cancer in 2008 but by 2015 he was diagnosed with bone cancer with three to 12 months to live. He died in his sleep on 5 December 2018 in Constantia, Cape Town, at the age of 87. Boraine died exactly five years to the day that Nelson Mandela died. He is survived by his wife Jenny; his four children, Andrew, Kathryn, Jeremy, and Nicholas; and seven grandchildren.

== Publications ==
- Alex Boraine and Janet Levy (31 December 1997) Dealing with the Past: Truth and Reconciliation in South Africa
- Alex Boraine (1 February 2001) A Country Unmasked: Inside South Africa's Truth and Reconciliation Commission
- Alex Boraine (1 September 2008) A Life in Transition
- Alex Boraine (26 February 2013) What's Gone Wrong?: South Africa on the Brink of Failed Statehood
