= Klaus von der Ropp =

German author, political advisor and anti-aparheid activist

Klaus Baron von der Ropp (born 17 September 1938 in Cologne, Germany) is a doctor of law, author, political advisor and former executive of the German Institute for International and Security Affairs. From the early 1970s he actively campaigned against apartheid. His near-fatal disappearance in the Namib Desert in 1975, which lasted almost four days, drew international media attention and was later featured in a BBC documentary.

== Early life ==
Klaus von der Ropp belongs to the German-Baltic noble family von der Ropp bearing the German title of Freiherr rendered in English as Baron. He was born and raised in Cologne, one of four children. After completing high school, he served his basic military duty in the German Air Force before studying law, modern history, and languages. Having passed his first and second state law examinations, he earned his doctorate in law and began working at the German Institute for International and Security Affairs (SWP). He headed its liaison offices in Bonn, and later in Berlin, from 1975 to 2000.

== Political work ==
Since 1971 von der Ropp has published some 180 essays on Southern African issues, particularly focusing on the struggle to overcome apartheid. His work appeared in foreign and security policy journals, commemorative publications, and anthologies, where he actively opposed apartheid and advocated for a policy of peaceful change in South Africa. He criticized the Western world, especially the Federal Republic of Germany, for its complicity in the apartheid regime due to its passivity and lack of a concrete strategy, urging for active political intervention against it. In South Africa von der Ropp called on both the black and non-black population groups to engage in constructive dialogue to replace the apartheid regime with a negotiated order that ensured robust protection for minorities. In July 1976, alongside Jürgen Blenck, an economic geographer at the Ruhr University Bochum, he introduced a widely acclaimed concept for dividing South Africa into separate black- and white-governed regions. Each region would be self-determined but subject to "massive minority protection". The proposed security guarantees for the non-black population were designed to encourage a willingness to compromise.

Supported by the Friedrich Naumann Foundation, von der Ropp was a facilitator of and participant in the Dakar Conference from 9 to 12 July 1987 in Dakar (Senegal), where Afrikaans dissidents and leading representatives of the ANC/SACP alliance, which was banned in South Africa at the time, explored peaceful solutions for overcoming apartheid in South Africa.

Von der Ropp's analyses and predictions were widely regarded as well-founded and earned considerable respect. He was considered a trusted advisor to German politicians Otto Graf Lambsdorff and Egon Bahr, both of whom he advised on issues of West German Africa policy and who took up von der Ropp's positions and proposed solutions – in particular that on the partition of South Africa.

== Disappearance in the Namib Desert ==
On the morning of 9 December 1975, von der Ropp, along with a group of four other tourists (three Britons and a German), set out from Swakopmund, Namibia, on an organized desert excursion with Charly's Atlantic Tours to the Namib Desert near the Skeleton Coast. In the afternoon, the tour guide, driving a Land Rover, strayed off the unpaved route. By around 4 pm, the group realized that the guide was driving in concentric circles and had become hopelessly lost. Eventually, the vehicle broke down due to an overheated engine. Contrary to all desert survival rules, the guide decided to go on foot to seek help—partly because there was only enough fuel left for 50 kilometers, while the nearest gas station was in Swakopmund, 145 kilometers away. He hoped to find assistance at a mountain visible in the distance on the horizon, called Blutkuppe. Out of solidarity and being the youngest member of the group, von der Ropp decided to accompany the guide for about an hour towards the supposed Blutkuppe before returning to the vehicle, where the other tourists remained.

After they separated as agreed after an hour, both became lost. The guide discovered that the mountain they were heading toward was not Blutkuppe but the desolate mountain known as Backenzahn, while von der Ropp could no longer locate the abandoned vehicle. Further complicating the situation, the guide had left no information about their route in Swakopmund, and von der Ropp had set out without a shirt or hat.

A large-scale search operation followed, conducted by the South African Defence Force and led by Major Peter Stark, who later detailed the events in his book The White Bushman. After 92 hours without food or water, von der Ropp was finally rescued from the Namib Desert by a search team on 13 December 1975, at 12:45 p.m. local time and was flown by helicopter to the hospital in Swakopmund. In a medical report dated 23 December 1975, Dr. Werner Zöllner noted that von der Ropp suffered from "severe dehydration" and "a mild sunburn."

The events of December 1975 were featured in the BBC documentary series Ray Mears' Extreme Survival, Season 3, Episode 4, "Namibia" (starting at 30:10).

== Volunteering ==
From 2000 to 2008, von der Ropp was honorary managing director of the Potsdam district association of the Naturschutzbund Deutschland, an NGO dedicated to wildlife conservation, and subsequently its honorary member.

== Books ==
- 1995: Südafrikas dorniger Weg auf der Suche nach Frieden Aufsätze 1975–1995. Nomos Verlagsgesellschaft, Baden-Baden, ISBN 3-7890-4328-1.
- 2025: South Africa National Self-Determination and Minority Protection: Dr. Klaus Baron von der Ropp answers Chancellor Helmut Schmidt's famous question "And replace it with what?" Festschrift for Dr. Klaus Baron von der Ropp. Die Vryheidstigting, Orania, ISBN 978-1-0492-3026-9 (print), ISBN 978-1-0492-3027-6 (electronic)
