= Frederik van Zyl Slabbert =

South African politician (1940–2010)

Leader of the Progressive Federal Party
- In office 1979–1986
- Preceded by: Colin Eglin
- Succeeded by: Colin Eglin

Personal details
- Born: 2 March 1940 Pretoria, South Africa
- Died: 14 May 2010 (aged 70) Johannesburg, South Africa
- Party: Progressive Federal Party
- Children: 2
- Education: University of Stellenbosch
- Occupation: Analyst, businessman, politician

Frederik van Zyl Slabbert GCOB (2 March 1940 – 14 May 2010) was a South African political analyst, businessman and politician. He is best known for having been the leader of the official opposition – the Progressive Federal Party (PFP) – in the House of Assembly from 1979 to 1986.

== Early life, education and academic career ==
Born in Pretoria to an Afrikaner family, Slabbert grew up in Pietersburg (now Polokwane) in northern Transvaal (now the Limpopo Province of South Africa). He matriculated from Pietersburg's Afrikaans High School in 1958. After graduating, he studied theology at the University of Stellenbosch for 18 months before deciding that sociology was his calling. He completed a BA Honours at the university, and a doctorate in 1967.

After completing his studies he worked as a sociology lecturer at Stellenbosch University, Rhodes University and the University of Cape Town. In 1973, he was appointed head of the sociology department of the University of the Witwatersrand.

== Political career ==
During his academic studies, Slabbert developed an active interest in politics, which led him to reject apartheid and to stand for a seat on Stellenbosch University's Students' Representative Council. He lost the election as he was considered to be too liberal.

In the 1974 general election, Slabbert stood for election as a Progressive Party (PP) candidate for the constituency of Rondebosch.

Although he was not expected to win the seat, he beat the United Party (UP) candidate by 1,600 votes. Slabbert defended and retained this seat in the parliamentary elections of 1977 and 1981.

Slabbert rose through the ranks of the PP and came to play an important role in the development of the party's ideology, particularly as the chairman of its Constitutional Committee. Using his influence, he helped to position the PP and its later incarnations as a liberal movement which advocated the creation of a non-racial democracy in South Africa. A respect for individual liberty became a cornerstone of the PP because of the work of Slabbert and others.

In 1979, he became leader of the Progressive Federal Party (PFP), a grouping formed after the PP merged with various other liberal elements, most notably Harry Schwarz's Reform Party. The PFP fared well in the 1981 elections, increasing its representation in the House of Assembly from 17 to 26 seats.

In 1986, Slabbert resigned from his position as leader of the opposition because he felt that Parliament was becoming an irrelevant institution in the context of South Africa's political problems. Prior to his resignation, he published a book entitled The Last White Parliament in which he explained his actions, and his predictions for the future of South Africa.

Following his resignation, Slabbert and Alex Boraine, a fellow PFP MP, formed the liberal think tank IDASA (Institute for Democracy in Africa) with funding from, among others, the Ford Foundation, the United States Agency for International Development and the National Endowment for Democracy. Critics from the left charged that it "pushed an essentially neoliberal agenda" focussing on limited forms of representative democracy in which economic questions were not subject to democratic control.

As head of IDASA, Slabbert played a leading role in initiating dialogue between white South Africans and the African National Congress (ANC). His efforts led to the Dakar Conference of 1987, which took place between the anti-apartheid movement and leading (mainly Afrikaner) politicians, academics and businessmen in Senegal. This conference represented the first step towards dismantling apartheid and informed subsequent negotiations (CODESA) which changed the course of South Africa's history.

In 2002, Slabbert was appointed by the then Minister of Home Affairs, with the approval of Cabinet, as the chair of the Electoral Task Team. The team had the responsibility of coming up with a new Electoral Act for South Africa. The task team completed its work by early 2003, and presented a report to Cabinet, including draft legislation, recommending a closed-list, mixed member proportional electoral system. However, the team's recommendations were never implemented.

== Business career ==
From the 1990s until his death, Slabbert was a successful entrepreneur and businessperson. Slabbert also worked as regional facilitator for the George Soros-backed funding organisation, the Open Society Initiative of Southern Africa, which identifies and invests in worthy projects in nine African countries.

In addition, he co-founded Khula — a black investment trust — in 1990. Slabbert was appointed as chairman of the Johannesburg Stock Exchange (JSE) listed Adcorp Holdings in 1998 and also sat on the boards of several other JSE-listed companies such as Wooltru, Investec, Caxton and Radiospoor.

== Final years ==
Slabbert was appointed as the 13th chancellor of Stellenbosch University on 1 August 2008, but he suffered a heart attack at the end of the same year, an event that led to him having a pacemaker inserted. He resigned from the post for health reasons in September 2009.

In early May 2010, Slabbert was discharged from hospital after receiving treatment for a liver related illness. He died at home on 14 May 2010. Slabbert was survived by his wife Jane and two children from his first marriage—Tania and Riko.

== Legacy ==
Many public figures in South Africa paid tribute to Slabbert for the role he played in ending apartheid.

In 2004, Slabbert was voted 82nd in the Top 100 Great South Africans.

== Works ==
- South Africa's Options: Strategies for Sharing with David Welsh. London: Rex Collings (1979). ISBN 0-86036-116-0
- The Last White Parliament: The Struggle for South Africa, by the Leader of the White Opposition. Sidgwick & Jackson (1986). ISBN 0-283-99349-9
- Comrades in Business: Post-Liberation Politics in South Africa with Heribert Adam and Kogila Moodley. Cape Town: Tafelberg Publishers (1998). ISBN 0-624-03601-4
- Tough Choices: Reflections of an Afrikaner African. Cape Town: Tafelberg Publishers (2000). ISBN 0-624-03880-7
- The Other Side of History: An Anecdotal Reflection on Political Transition in South Africa. Johannesburg & Cape Town: Jonathan Ball Publishers (2006). ISBN 1-86842-250-X (Also in Afrikaans as Duskant die geskiedenis, ISBN 0-624-04357-6.)

=== As editor ===
- Youth in the New South Africa: Towards Policy Formulation – Main Report of the Co-Operative Research Programme: South African Youth.
