= Antony Trew =

South African naval officer and writer

- Born: Antony Francis Trew; 5 June 1906; Pretoria
- Died: 12 June 1996 (aged 90); Chertsey, England, UK
- Occupations: Novelist, officer

Antony (Francis) Trew, (5 June 1906 in Pretoria, South Africa – 12 January 1996 in Chertsey, United Kingdom) was a South African naval officer and writer.

== World War II ==
In World War II Trew served with the South African and Royal Navies in the Atlantic, the Mediterranean and the Western Approaches. As such he was in command of the escort destroyer HMS Walker. He also served on the Arctic Convoys and was awarded the DSC (Distinguished Service Cross).

== Peace time ==
After World War II Trew resumed his work with the AA (Automobile Association) of South Africa as Director General.

== Bibliography ==
- Two Hours to Darkness (1963)
- Smoke Island (1964)
- The Sea Break (1966)
- The White Schooner (1969)
- Towards the Tamarind Trees (1970)
- The Moonraker Mutiny (1972)
- Kleber's Convoy (1974)
- The Zhukov Briefing (1975)
- Ultimatum (1976; aka The Soukour Deadline)
- Death of a Supertanker (1978)
- The Antonov Project (1979)
- Sea Fever (1980)
- Running Wild (1982)
- Bannister's Chart (1984)
- Yashimoto's Last Dive (1986)
- The Chalk Circle (1989)
- The Road to the River and Other Stories (1992)
