= Institute for Democratic Alternatives in South Africa =

South African think tank

The Institute for Democratic Alternatives in South Africa
- Founders: Frederik van Zyl Slabbert; Alex Boraine
- Established: 1986
- Focus: Democracy, Political transparency, Good governance
- Staff: 80 to 160
- Location: Cape Town, South Africa
- Dissolved: 2013

The Institute for Democratic Alternatives in South Africa (IDASA) later known as the Institute for Democracy in South Africa was a South African-based think-tank organisation that was formed in 1986 by Frederik van Zyl Slabbert and Alex Boraine. Its initial focus from 1987 was creating an environment for white South Africans to talk to the banned liberation movement in-exile, the African National Congress (ANC) prior to its unbanning in 1990 by the President F. W. de Klerk. After the South African election in 1994, its focus was on ensuing the establishment of democratic institutions in the country, political transparency and good governance. Caught up in a funding crisis after the Great Recession, it closed in 2013.

It is best known for the Dakar Conference (also known as the Dakar Dialogue or the Dakar Initiative), a historic conference between members of IDASA and the ANC. It was held in Dakar, Senegal, between 9 and 12 July 1987. The conference discussed topics such as strategies for bringing fundamental change in South Africa, national unity, structures of the government and the future of the economy in a free South Africa. The IDASA delegation from South Africa participated in the conference in their private capacity and would later be condemned by the South African government for meeting a banned organization.

== Background ==
Frederik van Zyl Slabbert, a member of the opposition resigned from the Progressive Federal Party and the South African parliament in January 1986, describing it as irrelevant and that he would explore other avenues of negotiations between white and black South Africans. Dr. Alex Boraine also left with him.

Van Zyl Slabbert and Boraine established The Institute for Democratic Alternatives in South Africa (IDASA), a non-partisan organization that aimed to promote inclusive democracy in South Africa by talking to people of all races within and outside the country. It second aim was to find a non-racial and democratic alternatives to current system of apartheid in South Africa. It started with few plans and very little money.

As political change occurred in South African society, so IDASA adapted its mission and focus since its foundation. These are described as six phases:

- Building a climate for democracy (1986–1990)
- Critical ally for transition (1990–93)
- Supporting the foundation election (1993–95)
- Building democratic institutions (1995–98)
- Empowering citizens (1998–2000)
- Promote the use of its existing strategies worldwide

=== Role prior to the end of apartheid ===
Prior to the historic event that occurred in 1987 in Dakar, the first IDASA meeting occurred in Port Elizabeth on 8–9 May 1987, when 400 delegates met to discuss democracy and its relationship with government, labour, business education, law, media and religion. But the Dakar Conference had its origins least a year earlier. Slabbert, in communication with Thabo Mbeki, a member of the ANC National Executive, discussed the change in attitude amongst some of the Afrikaner elite towards Afrikaner Nationalism and Apartheid. Out of these discussions and meetings, an idea was generated for a possible meeting between them and the ANC. This would be a change from the current opposition White liberals policy of attempting to force political change from within the parliamentary system, to the Afrikaner elite taking direct action in shaping the future of direction of South Africa.

Later in 1986, Slabbert and Breyten Breytenbach met on Gorée Island of Dakar in Senegal and decided that the city should be the location of the conference. The two then approached George Soros to help finance the conference, which he would do, but he was skeptical that the conference would achieve anything for South Africa. The conference that occurred in July 1987 would later be known as the Dakar Conference but was also known as the Dakar Dialogue or Dakar Initiative. It would not achieve peace in South Africa or a non-racial settlement, but it may have given permission for Afrikaners to talk to the ANC. President PW Botha was furious at IDASA and its delegates and proposed to confiscate their passports and proposed a law which reached a draft bill stage to ban the organization and others but after IDASA pressurized the foreign diplomats in South Africa, that pressure forced the government to revise the bill and it was never banned.

Money would start to flow into IDASA's coffers, and in order to maintain its independence, there was a reluctance to accept money from corporate South Africa as this could have created a perception of a conflict of interest as the white liberals opposition had traditionally raised money from English businesses. The first donor would be the Norwegian consulate and soon other donors would follow such as the Joseph Rowntree Trust, Cadbury Trust and the Ford and Rockefeller Foundation's. The Ford Foundation would donate $1.165 million in 1996, a foundation that traditionally donated $50,000 to $200,000 to worthy African organisations. In 1996, USAID would donate $1 million over a two-year period. Considerable funding was also received from the National Endowment for Democracy.

A conference was called on 15–16 July 1988, titled The Freedom Charter and the Future. The conference delegates would discuss the Freedom Charter, a charter created in 1955, attempting to understand its importance to the black opposition parties in exile. In October 1988, IDASA would arrange a meeting in Leverkusen, Germany. It would bring together an ANC delegation which included Joe Slovo, the leader of the South African Communist Party (SACP) and a Soviet delegation of academics. IDASA's aim was to discuss a future economic policy for a new South African dispensation. Some critics have argued that this future policy took the form of a Neo-liberal economics.

IDASA would also arrange a gathering in Lusaka, Zambia, in May 1990. It would bring together members of the South African Defence Force (SADF) and the ANC's military wing, Umkhonto we Sizwe (MK) for discussions on the future security in a new South Africa and the shape of future defence force. President FW de Klerk had not yet declared an amnesty for members of MK so Zambia had to be the location nor could the SADF endorse the meeting but quietly encouraged senior members and past members to accept the invitation. The five day conference would reach consensus on a need for both sides to maintain a cessation of hostilities, end conscription and the future merging of the SADF, MK, other liberation armies and homelands defence forces into a new non-racial, non-political military organization. These ideas would form the basis of the new South African National Defence Force (SANDF).

In 1992, IDASA established the Training Centre of Democracy in Johannesburg. It aimed to foster the ideas of democracy in South African community leaders with training in democracy's philosophy, history and processes. Also in 1992, another conference was held titled Policing in South Africa in the 1990s. Here the South African Police met political leaders and policing experts to discuss policing in a new South African political structure, restoring confidence and respect with the general public after many years of the police being used to enforce apartheids rules and legislation.

IDASA also organized five Constitutional Safaris from 1992 to 1994 whereby members of the future political parties who were drafting a new constitution for South Africa were able to visit the major political parties in Europe, North America and Australia to study best-practice of democracy. In order to engage the right wing in South Africa in a future democratic South Africa, IDASA created a program called Dialogue with Conservatives and sought to engage the white right-wing and would eventually bring the Freedom Front to a meeting with Nelson Mandela and the ANC and ensuring their eventual participation the 1994 South African election and reducing the threat of the far right.

=== Role after 1994 election ===
In 1994, IDASA was renamed the Institute of Democracy in South Africa to reflect the nature of the country's 1994 election and the transition to a democratic government. So IDASA's mission changed and in 1995, they created the Public Information Centre (PIC) a body that would monitor the performance and accountability of the new government for the public in form of a critical ally and influence public policy. It would also create the Public Information and Monitoring Service (PIMS) to support democracy and ethical activities in government through training programs in democracy and it would also support democracy by submitting submissions to parliamentary committees. In 1998, IDASA implemented a campaign to educate voters for the forthcoming 1999 South African election by training voter education officials and by distributing voter education packages.

IDASA would eventually evolve into a structure consisting of nine divisions or programs:

- All Media Group
- Budget Information Service
- Centre for Governance in Africa
- Community and Citizen Empowerment Programme
- Governance and Aids Programme
- Local Government Centre
- Peace Building and Conflict Resolution
- Right to Know Programme
- Southern African Migration Project

In 2005, IDASA sought court action to force political parties to disclose the origin of political donation. The application was sought to test the Promotion of Access to Information Act and named the parties named in the application as the ANC, Democratic Alliance, Inkatha Freedom Party and New National Party. ISDA want the parties to disclose their private donors, the amount given and any conditions under which the donation was made allowing the public to decide if anything untoward would influence political parties decisions. A Cape High Court judge would rule against IDASA, accepting the ANC's argument that a legislative route was to be attempted and the IDASA did not appeal the decision. In an effort to promote democracy in other parts of Africa, Idasa would open offices in Nigeria, the Democratic Republic of Congo and Zimbabwe and maintained projects in Uganda, Zambia, Angola, Lesotho, Malawi, Tanzania, Mozambique, and Swaziland to bring democratic ideals to those countries.

== Demise ==
After the Great Recession, the funding donations from around the world that sustained IDASA's budgets and programs began to dry up or were severely cut especially to countries now seen as being democratically stable. IDASA had also expanded into Africa by re-granting funds to worthy organisations but this was complex and due to budgeting issues good staff were lost. Due to a lack of a philanthropic philosophy in South African society, funding was therefore limited despite complaints by society concerning the political climate and the state of democracy in the country. Society's funding of political parties did not seem to be a problem though and the organization would close on 26 March 2013 after a press announcement by Paul Graham, the executive director of The Institute for Democracy in Africa.

== Criticisms ==
Some critics from the left have argued that IDASA, with funding from the United States Agency for International Development and the National Endowment for Democracy, "pushed an essentially Neo-liberal agenda" focussing on limited forms of representative democracy in which economic questions were not subject to democratic control.
