= Results of the 1920 South African general election =

- 10 March 1920

All 134 seats in the House of Assembly 68 seats needed for a majority
- Registered: 421,790
- Turnout: 66.94% (▼4.63pp)
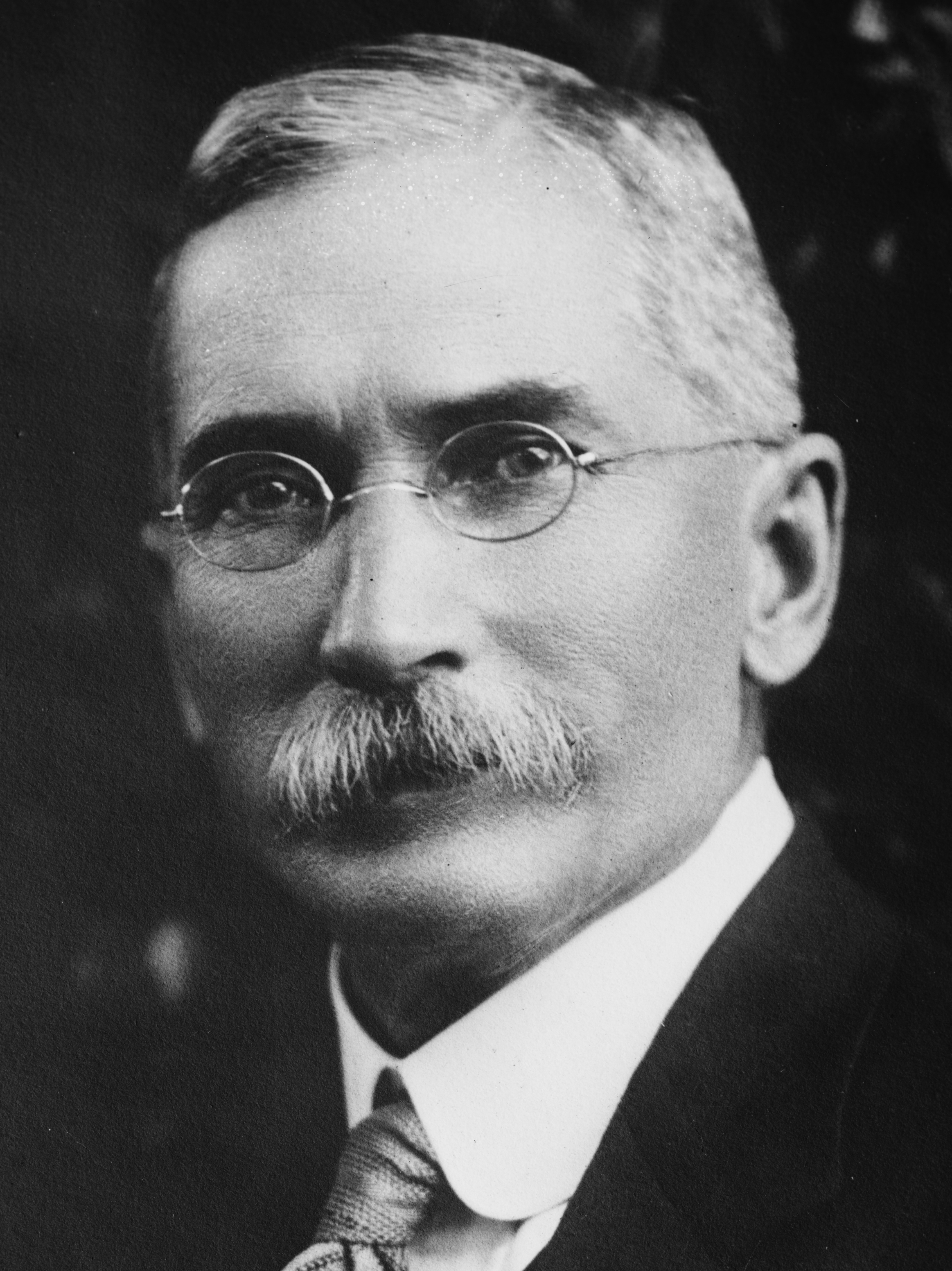

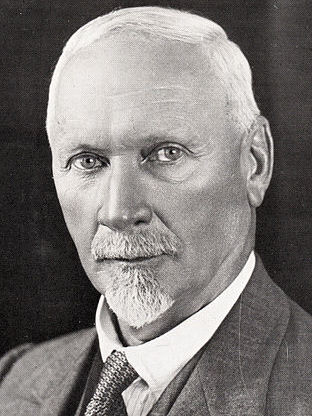

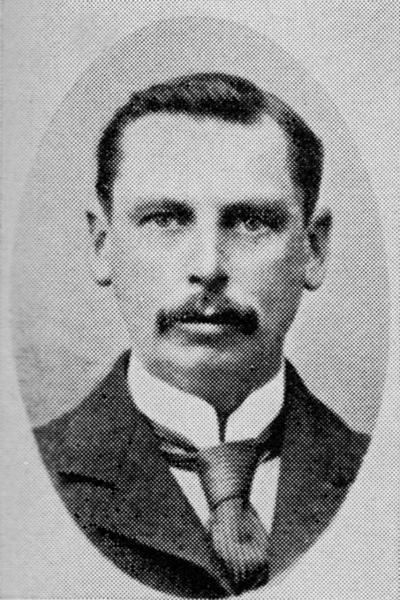

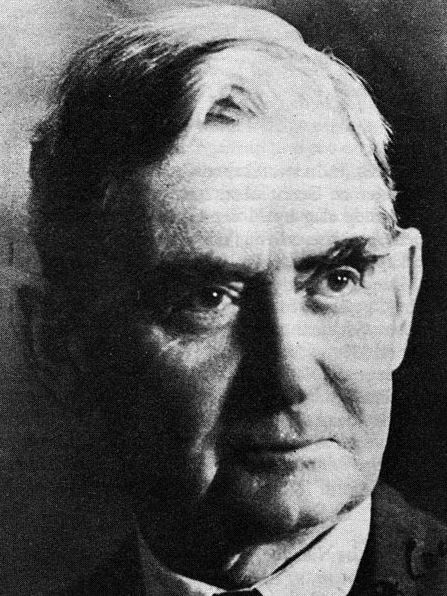
	First party	Second party
Leader	J. B. M. Hertzog	Jan Smuts
Party	National	South African
Leader's seat	Smithfield	Wonderboom
Last election	29.41%, 27 seats	36.67%, 54 seats
Seats won	43	41
Seat change	▲16	▼13
Popular vote	90,512	101,227
Percentage	32.62%	36.48%
Swing	▲3.21pp	▼0.19pp
	Third party	Fourth party
Leader	Thomas Smartt	Frederic Creswell
Party	Unionist	Labour
Leader's seat	Fort Beaufort	Troyeville
Last election	19.42%, 39 seats	9.63%, 4 seats
Seats won	25	21
Seat change	▼14	▲17
Popular vote	38,946	40,639
Percentage	14.03%	14.65%
Swing	▼5.39pp	▲5.01pp
- Results by province
Prime Minister before election
Jan Smuts
South African
Elected Prime Minister
Jan Smuts
South African

This is a list of constituency results for the 1920 South African general election.

== Boundary changes ==
The Third Delimitation Commission (1919) expanded the House of Assembly from 130 to 134 seats, with all four new seats going to the Transvaal, but the Commission also made changes to the constituencies in the three other provinces.

Province	Seats 1915	Created	Abolished	Seats 1920
Cape of Good Hope	51	Albert-Aliwal; Salt River	Albert; Aliwal	51
Natal	17	Durban Stamford Hill; Illovo; Natal Coast	Durban Umlazi; Umzimkulu; Victoria County	17
Orange Free State	17	Bloemfontein North; Bloemfontein South	Bloemfontein; Bloemfontein District	17
Transvaal	45	Brakpan; Christiana; Jeppes; Johannesburg North; Pietersburg; Roodepoort; Ventersdorp; Witbank; Wonderboom	Georgetown; Maraisburg; Ophirton; Randfontein; Siemert	49

== Cape Province ==
Party	Votes	%	Seats
South African Party	42,002	32.75	12
National Party	39,837	31.06	16
Unionist Party	24,644	19.22	17
Labour Party	14,908	11.63	4
Independents	6,847	5.34	2
Total	128,238	100.00	51
Source: Schoeman

Unopposed candidates: Unionists 2.

=== Albany ===
General election 1920: Albany
Party	Candidate	Votes	%	±%
Unionist	Frederick John Werndly van der Riet	Unopposed		
Unionist hold				

=== Albert-Aliwal ===
General election 1920: Albert-Aliwal
Party	Candidate	Votes	%	±%
National	Louis Petrus Vorster	1,461	50.3	−4.4
South African	Constantine Alexander Schweizer	1,444	49.7	+4.4
Majority		17	0.6	−8.8
Turnout		2,905	75.8	−14.2
National hold		Swing	-4.4	

=== Barkly ===
General election 1920: Barkly
Party	Candidate	Votes	%	±%
National	Wilhelm Bruckner de Villiers	1,238	48.9	+19.9
Unionist	Arnold Hirst Watkins	842	33.3	−36.3
South African	Jacobus Stephanus Kruger	452	17.9	New
Majority		396	15.6	N/A
Turnout		2,532	70.8	−5.0
National gain from Unionist		Swing	+28.1	

=== Beaconsfield ===
General election 1920: Beaconsfield
Party	Candidate	Votes	%	±%
Independent	David Harris	2,032	73.6	−7.6
Labour	Albert Oliver Adendorff	729	26.4	+7.6
Majority		1,303	47.2	−15.2
Turnout		2,761	70.5	+19.6
Independent hold		Swing	-7.6	

=== Beaufort West ===
General election 1920: Beaufort West
Party	Candidate	Votes	%	±%
National	Pieter Wynand le Roux	1,648	61.5	+12.4
South African	Petrus Benjamin van der Westhuizen	1,032	38.5	−12.4
Majority		612	23.0	N/A
Turnout		2,680	76.1	−5.6
National gain from South African		Swing	+12.4	

=== Bechuanaland ===
General election 1920: Bechuanaland
Party	Candidate	Votes	%	±%
South African	Max Sonnenberg	1,324	51.6	−4.5
National	Ignatius van Wijk Raubenheimer	1,242	48.4	+4.5
Majority		82	3.2	−9.0
Turnout		2,566	73.9	+0.6
South African hold		Swing	-4.5	

=== Border ===
General election 1920: Border
Party	Candidate	Votes	%	±%
Unionist	George Blaine	1,239	58.0	−3.1
Labour	Wilfred Lawson Plyman	492	23.0	New
National	Willem Andries Fourie	407	19.0	New
Majority		747	35.0	N/A
Turnout		2,138	59.7	−1.0
Unionist hold		Swing	N/A	

=== Caledon ===
General election 1920: Caledon
Party	Candidate	Votes	%	±%
South African	Christman Joel Krige	1,696	59.8	−4.2
National	Marthinus Gysbert Viljoen	1,141	40.2	+4.2
Majority		555	19.6	−8.4
Turnout		2,837	80.2	−4.9
South African hold		Swing	-4.2	

=== Calvinia ===
General election 1920: Calvinia
Party	Candidate	Votes	%	±%
National	Daniël François Malan	1,601	60.0	+3.6
South African	Hendrik Johannes Nel	1,069	40.0	−3.6
Majority		301	20.0	+7.2
Turnout		2,670	76.2	−6.6
National hold		Swing	+3.6	

=== Cape Town Castle ===
General election 1920: Cape Town Castle
Party	Candidate	Votes	%	±%
Unionist	Morris Alexander	1,395	61.0	New
Independent	Robert Ernest Farr	892	39.0	New
Majority		503	22.0	N/A
Turnout		2,287	54.1	N/A
Unionist hold		Swing	N/A	

=== Cape Town Central ===
General election 1920: Cape Town Central
Party	Candidate	Votes	%	±%
Unionist	John William Jagger	1,651	64.1	−1.9
Labour	Alfred Palmer	924	35.9	+1.9
Majority		727	28.2	−3.8
Turnout		2,575	60.2	−10.0
Unionist hold		Swing	-1.9	

=== Cape Town Gardens ===
General election 1920: Cape Town Gardens
Party	Candidate	Votes	%	±%
Labour	Robert Forsyth	1,365	55.7	+18.3
Unionist	William Duncan Baxter	1,087	44.3	−18.3
Majority		278	11.4	N/A
Turnout		2,452	58.3	−2.2
Labour gain from Unionist		Swing	+18.3	

=== Cape Town Harbour ===
General election 1920: Cape Town Harbour
Party	Candidate	Votes	%	±%
Unionist	Gideon Brand van Zyl	1,234	53.3	−20.9
Labour	Albert Francis Batty	1,080	46.7	+20.9
Majority		154	7.6	−41.8
Turnout		2,314	53.7	−6.6
Unionist hold		Swing	-20.9	

=== Ceres ===
General election 1920: Ceres
Party	Candidate	Votes	%	±%
National	Johannes Wilhelmus Jacobus Wessel Roux	1,681	55.8	+11.6
South African	Evelyn William Krige	1,329	44.2	−11.6
Majority		352	11.6	N/A
Turnout		3,010	84.9	+2.9
National gain from South African		Swing	+11.6	

=== Colesberg ===
General election 1920: Colesberg
Party	Candidate	Votes	%	±%
South African	George Albertyn Louw	1,350	46.0	−9.3
National	Diederick Johannes Jooste	1,344	45.8	+1.1
Labour	Menzies MacDougall Sutherland	241	8.2	New
Majority		6	0.2	−10.4
Turnout		2,935	76.7	−5.5
South African hold		Swing	-5.2	

=== Cradock ===
General election 1920: Cradock
Party	Candidate	Votes	%	±%
National	Isaac Petrus van Heerden	1,525	51.7	+7.2
South African	Hercules Christiaan van Heerden	1,427	48.3	−7.2
Majority		98	3.4	N/A
Turnout		2,952	79.8	−8.4
National gain from South African		Swing	+7.2	

=== East London ===
General election 1920: East London
Party	Candidate	Votes	%	±%
Labour	James Stewart	1,368	50.6	+11.8
Unionist	Charles James Lownds	1,338	49.4	+2.1
Majority		30	1.2	N/A
Turnout		2,706	68.3	+3.5
Labour gain from Unionist		Swing	+7.0	

=== Fort Beaufort ===
General election 1920: Fort Beaufort
Party	Candidate	Votes	%	±%
Unionist	Thomas William Smartt	Unopposed		
Unionist hold				

=== George ===
General election 1920: George
Party	Candidate	Votes	%	±%
National	George Fredrick Brink	1,414	50.3	−2.3
South African	Thomas Searle	1,396	49.7	+2.3
Majority		18	0.6	−4.6
Turnout		2,810	79.4	−1.5
National hold		Swing	-2.3	

=== Graaff-Reinet ===
General election 1920: Graaff-Reinet
Party	Candidate	Votes	%	±%
National	Johan Martin Enslin	1,480	58.9	+5.3
South African	Gideon François Smith	1,033	41.1	−5.3
Majority		447	17.8	+10.6
Turnout		2,513	72.2	−0.8
National hold		Swing	+5.3	

=== Griqualand ===
General election 1920: Griqualand
Party	Candidate	Votes	%	±%
Unionist	John Gavin King	941	50.8	−33.4
South African	Charles Edward Todd	912	49.2	New
Majority		29	1.6	N/A
Turnout		1,853	54.6	−10.2
Unionist hold		Swing	N/A	

=== Hopetown ===
General election 1920: Hopetown
Party	Candidate	Votes	%	±%
South African	Petrus Stephanus Cilliers	1,359	52.7	−11.0
National	Hermanus Johannes Wessels	1,222	47.3	+11.0
Majority		137	5.4	−22.0
Turnout		2,581	74.8	−1.2
South African hold		Swing	-11.0	

=== Humansdorp ===
General election 1920: Humansdorp
Party	Candidate	Votes	%	±%
National	Charl Wynand Malan	1,687	58.9	+5.5
South African	Jacobus Michael Rademeyer	1,175	41.1	−5.5
Majority		512	17.8	+11.0
Turnout		2,862	84.3	−7.9
National hold		Swing	+5.5	

=== Kimberley ===
General election 1920: Kimberley
Party	Candidate	Votes	%	±%
Unionist	Henry Alfred Oliver	1,574	61.2	−12.3
Labour	Jeremiah Wills	821	31.9	+5.4
Independent	Frederick Hicks	179	7.0	New
Majority		753	29.3	−17.7
Turnout		2,574	66.3	+2.9
Unionist hold		Swing	-8.9	

=== King William's Town ===
General election 1920: King William's Town
Party	Candidate	Votes	%	±%
Independent	George Whitaker	1,461	60.6	+1.4
Labour	John Carver	949	39.4	New
Majority		512	21.2	N/A
Turnout		2,410	65.8	−14.1
Independent hold		Swing	N/A	

=== Ladismith ===
General election 1920: Ladismith
Party	Candidate	Votes	%	±%
South African	Paul Jacobus Jordaan	1,648	53.1	+1.0
National	Johannes Jacobus Marthinus van Zyl	1,454	46.9	−0.1
Majority		140	6.2	+1.1
Turnout		3,102	88.3	−2.1
South African hold		Swing	+0.6	

=== Liesbeek ===
General election 1920: Liesbeek
Party	Candidate	Votes	%	±%
Unionist	James Wellwood Mushet	832	38.6	New
Labour	Charles Pearce	780	36.1	−7.2
South African	Christian August Lagesen	546	25.3	New
Majority		52	2.5	N/A
Turnout		2,158	52.1	−12.7
Unionist gain from Labour		Swing	N/A	

=== Malmesbury ===
General election 1920: Malmesbury
Party	Candidate	Votes	%	±%
South African	François Stephanus Malan	1,700	56.8	−0.7
Independent	Johannes Gerhardus van der Horst	1,292	43.2	New
Majority		408	13.6	N/A
Turnout		2,992	81.2	−7.2
South African hold		Swing	N/A	

=== Namaqualand ===
General election 1920: Namaqualand
Party	Candidate	Votes	%	±%
National	Jacobus Petrus Mostert	1,459	66.3	+32.2
South African	Albertus Myburgh Johannes Roux	741	33.7	−21.3
Majority		718	32.6	N/A
Turnout		2,200	65.7	−11.9
National gain from South African		Swing	+26.8	

=== Newlands ===
General election 1920: Newlands
Party	Candidate	Votes	%	±%
Unionist	William Porter Buchanan	1,514	64.8	−14.9
Labour	John Lomax	823	35.2	+14.9
Majority		691	29.6	−29.8
Turnout		2,337	55.5	+0.1
Unionist hold		Swing	-14.9	

=== Oudtshoorn ===
General election 1920: Oudtshoorn
Party	Candidate	Votes	%	±%
National	Cornelis Jacobus Langenhoven	1,545	53.9	+10.4
South African	Andries Hermanus Mulder	1,320	46.1	−8.9
Majority		225	5.8	N/A
Turnout		2,865	78.0	+2.1
National gain from South African		Swing	+9.7	

=== Paarl ===
General election 1920: Paarl
Party	Candidate	Votes	%	±%
South African	Andries Lourens de Jager	1,819	58.0	−6.5
National	Paulus Philippus du Toit	1,200	38.3	+2.8
Labour	Charles Henry Haggar	115	3.7	New
Majority		619	19.7	−9.3
Turnout		3,134	81.4	−5.6
South African hold		Swing	-4.7	

=== Piketberg ===
General election 1920: Piketberg
Party	Candidate	Votes	%	±%
National	Jan Hendrik Hofmeyr de Waal	1,742	60.8	+4.6
South African	Jan Hendrik Hofmeyr	1,124	39.2	−4.6
Majority		618	21.6	+9.2
Turnout		2,866	79.4	−5.1
National hold		Swing	+4.6	

=== Port Elizabeth Central ===
General election 1920: Port Elizabeth Central
Party	Candidate	Votes	%	±%
Unionist	Edgar Harris Walton	1,414	69.6	N/A
Labour	Richard Muir Brown	619	30.4	New
Majority		795	39.2	N/A
Turnout		2,033	49.8	N/A
Unionist hold		Swing	N/A	

=== Port Elizabeth Southwest ===
General election 1920: Port Elizabeth Southwest
Party	Candidate	Votes	%	±%
Unionist	William Macintosh	1,750	70.1	−5.6
Labour	Alfred John Charles Webb	748	29.9	+5.6
Majority		1,002	40.2	−11.2
Turnout		2,498	61.5	−12.5
Unionist hold		Swing	-5.6	

=== Prieska ===
General election 1920: Prieska
Party	Candidate	Votes	%	±%
National	Johannes Hendrik Conradie	1,249	50.8	+6.7
South African	Jan Paul Coetzee	1,209	49.2	−6.5
Majority		40	1.6	N/A
Turnout		2,458	73.7	+2.4
National gain from South African		Swing	+6.6	

=== Queenstown ===
General election 1920: Queenstown
Party	Candidate	Votes	%	±%
Unionist	Arthur Henry Frost	1,585	55.4	−12.0
National	Andreas Johannes Oelofse	905	31.6	New
Independent	Alexander Sim	372	13.0	New
Majority		680	23.8	N/A
Turnout		2,862	75.2	+4.7
Unionist hold		Swing	N/A	

=== Riversdale ===
General election 1920: Riversdale
Party	Candidate	Votes	%	±%
South African	Jacobus Frederik van Wyk	1,734	50.6	−6.4
National	Jacobus Frederik Badenhorst	1,690	49.4	+6.4
Majority		44	1.2	−12.8
Turnout		3,424	90.3	+1.0
South African hold		Swing	-6.4	

=== Rondebosch ===
General election 1920: Rondebosch
Party	Candidate	Votes	%	±%
Unionist	Ralph William Close	1,241	65.0	−18.3
Labour	Joseph Seddon	668	35.0	+18.3
Majority		573	30.0	N/A
Turnout		1,909	46.6	−14.6
Unionist hold		Swing	N/A	

=== Salt River ===
General election 1920: Salt River
Party	Candidate	Votes	%	±%
Labour	Walter John Snow	1,488	66.2	New
Unionist	Fred Barnett Barling	648	28.8	New
Independent	William Moore	112	5.0	New
Majority		840	37.4	N/A
Turnout		2,248	54.6	N/A
Labour win (new seat)				

=== Somerset ===
General election 1920: Somerset
Party	Candidate	Votes	%	±%
National	Adriaan Paulus Johannes Fourie	1,630	56.6	+8.8
South African	Andries Stockenström	1,250	43.4	−8.8
Majority		380	13.2	N/A
Turnout		2,880	79.6	−7.1
National gain from South African		Swing	+8.8	

=== South Peninsula ===
General election 1920: South Peninsula
Party	Candidate	Votes	%	±%
Unionist	Murray Bisset	1,203	65.2	+9.8
Labour	Charles Henry Haggar	385	20.9	+15.4
Independent	Willem Hendrik Lategan	257	13.9	New
Majority		818	44.3	N/A
Turnout		1,845	45.9	−24.5
Unionist hold		Swing	N/A	

=== Stellenbosch ===
General election 1920: Stellenbosch
Party	Candidate	Votes	%	±%
South African	John Xavier Merriman	1,810	62.5	−3.7
National	Pieter de Waal	996	34.4	+0.6
Independent	Percy Broughton Smith	92	3.2	New
Majority		814	28.1	−4.3
Turnout		2,898	76.3	−11.1
South African hold		Swing	-2.2	

=== Swellendam ===
General election 1920: Swellendam
Party	Candidate	Votes	%	±%
South African	Jacobus Willem van Eeden	1,563	60.2	−8.5
National	Jacobus Hendrik Coetzee	1,011	38.9	+7.6
Independent	Wynand Charl Hugo	22	0.8	New
Majority		552	21.3	−16.1
Turnout		2,596	74.9	−10.4
South African hold		Swing	-8.1	

=== Tembuland ===
General election 1920: Tembuland
Party	Candidate	Votes	%	±%
Unionist	William Hemming Stuart	1,225	54.3	+7.0
South African	Charles Percivale Bligh-Wall	1,030	45.7	+14.0
Majority		195	8.6	−7.0
Turnout		2,255	65.1	−9.4
Unionist hold		Swing	-3.5	

=== Three Rivers ===
General election 1920: Three Rivers
Party	Candidate	Votes	%	±%
Unionist	Daniel Maclaren Brown	1,305	60.6	+19.6
South African	William Thomas Fowler	734	34.1	+3.7
Independent	Johannes Herculas van der Vyver	114	5.3	New
Majority		571	26.5	+15.9
Turnout		2,153	55.6	−24.4
Unionist hold		Swing	+7.9	

=== Uitenhage ===
General election 1920: Uitenhage
Party	Candidate	Votes	%	±%
South African	William Richardson Burch	1,679	53.2	−7.6
National	Henry Eardley Stephen Fremantle	1,478	46.8	+7.6
Majority		201	6.4	−15.2
Turnout		3,157	81.6	−4.5
South African hold		Swing	-7.6	

=== Victoria West ===
General election 1920: Victoria West
Party	Candidate	Votes	%	±%
National	François Jacobus du Toit	1,521	52.8	+5.7
South African	Andrew Meintjes Conroy	1,362	47.2	−5.7
Majority		159	5.6	N/A
Turnout		2,883	85.5	+10.1
National gain from South African		Swing	+5.7	

=== Wodehouse ===
General election 1920: Wodehouse
Party	Candidate	Votes	%	±%
National	Octavius Septimus Vermooten	1,551	50.6	−0.3
South African	Jan Abraham Venter	1,513	49.4	+0.3
Majority		38	1.2	−0.6
Turnout		3,064	82.2	−5.1
National hold		Swing	-0.3	

=== Woodstock ===
General election 1920: Woodstock
Party	Candidate	Votes	%	±%
Labour	Isaac Purcell	1,313	53.9	+35.4
Unionist	John Hewat	626	25.7	−9.6
South African	Alexander John McCallum	475	19.5	−9.0
Independent	James Simington Hutchinson	22	0.9	New
Majority		687	28.2	N/A
Turnout		2,436	57.6	−2.8
Labour gain from Unionist		Swing	+22.5	

=== Worcester ===
General election 1920: Worcester
Party	Candidate	Votes	%	±%
South African	Charles Beeton Heatlie	1,747	57.1	−9.6
National	Albert Jacobus Stals	1,315	42.9	+9.6
Majority		432	14.2	−19.2
Turnout		3,062	83.6	−2.8
South African hold		Swing	-9.6	

== Natal ==
Party	Votes	%	Seats
South African Party	8,236	37.00	9
Labour Party	6,946	31.21	5
Unionist Party	4,166	18.72	3
National Party	2,618	11.76	0
Independents	292	1.31	0
Total	22,258	100.00	17
Source: Schoeman

=== Dundee ===
General election 1920: Dundee
Party	Candidate	Votes	%	±%
South African	Thomas Watt	377	30.9	−33.7
Unionist	Edward Mackenzie Greene	360	29.5	New
National	Jurie Johannes Kemp	297	24.3	New
Labour	Norman Ray Baytopp	187	15.3	−7.1
Majority		17	1.4	N/A
Turnout		1,221	67.1	+2.1
South African hold		Swing	N/A	

=== Durban Berea ===
General election 1920: Durban Berea
Party	Candidate	Votes	%	±%
Unionist	James Henderson	779	65.0	N/A
Labour	Garnett Jones	419	35.0	New
Majority		360	30.0	N/A
Turnout		1,198	50.9	N/A
Unionist hold		Swing	N/A	

=== Durban Central ===
General election 1920: Durban Central
Party	Candidate	Votes	%	±%
Labour	John William Coleman	827	63.2	+24.1
Unionist	Charles Henwood	482	36.8	−24.1
Majority		345	26.4	N/A
Turnout		1,309	55.1	−14.3
Labour gain from Unionist		Swing	+24.1	

=== Durban Greyville ===
General election 1920: Durban Greyville
Party	Candidate	Votes	%	±%
Labour	Thomas Boydell	1,067	78.9	+25.8
Unionist	William George Halford	286	21.1	−25.8
Majority		781	57.8	+51.6
Turnout		1,353	59.0	−15.6
Labour hold		Swing	+25.8	

=== Durban Point ===
General election 1920: Durban Point
Party	Candidate	Votes	%	±%
Labour	Archibald Jamieson	941	49.2	+17.3
South African	Harold Graham MacKeurtan	846	44.3	New
Independent	Harry Bertram Bradford	124	6.5	New
Majority		95	4.9	−31.0
Turnout		1,562	65.6	−5.5
Labour gain from Independent		Swing	N/A	

=== Durban Stamford Hill ===
General election 1920: Durban Stamford Hill
Party	Candidate	Votes	%	±%
Unionist	John Gavin Hunter	689	50.7	New
Labour	Herbert Henry Kemp	670	49.3	New
Majority		19	1.4	N/A
Turnout		1,359	55.5	N/A
Unionist win (new seat)				

=== Durban Umbilo ===
General election 1920: Durban Umbilo
Party	Candidate	Votes	%	±%
Labour	Frank Nettleton	901	62.7	+24.8
Unionist	Charles Phineas Robinson	535	37.3	−24.8
Majority		366	25.2	N/A
Turnout		1,436	65.2	−3.1
Labour gain from Unionist		Swing	+24.8	

=== Illovo ===
General election 1920: Illovo
Party	Candidate	Votes	%	±%
Unionist	John Sydney Marwick	647	59.4	New
South African	Alfred Fawcus	442	40.6	+26.6
Majority		205	18.8	N/A
Turnout		1,089	61.6	N/A
Unionist win (new seat)				

=== Klip River ===
General election 1920: Klip River
Party	Candidate	Votes	%	±%
South African	Henry Burton	809	59.5	−17.3
National	Andries Theodorus Spies	382	28.1	+4.9
Labour	Marten Mulder	168	12.4	New
Majority		427	31.4	−22.2
Turnout		1,359	71.1	+7.0
South African hold		Swing	-11.1	

=== Natal Coast ===
General election 1920: Natal Coast
Party	Candidate	Votes	%	±%
South African	Edward George Arthur Saunders	654	58.3	New
Labour	John Robinson Royston	300	26.7	New
Independent	Nelson Pond Palmer	168	15.0	New
Majority		354	31.6	N/A
Turnout		1,122	54.4	N/A
South African win (new seat)				

=== Newcastle ===
General election 1920: Newcastle
Party	Candidate	Votes	%	±%
South African	Theunis Jacobus Nel	682	54.2	+15.0
National	Johannes Hendricus Brand Wessels	576	45.8	+17.8
Majority		106	8.4	N/A
Turnout		1,258	73.8	+8.1
South African hold		Swing	N/A	

=== Pietermaritzburg North ===
General election 1920: Pietermaritzburg North
Party	Candidate	Votes	%	±%
Labour	Thomas Gillately Strachan	917	61.6	+31.4
South African	Thomas Orr	572	38.4	−31.4
Majority		345	23.2	N/A
Turnout		1,489	67.0	+3.4
Labour gain from		Swing	+31.4	

=== Pietermaritzburg South ===
General election 1920: Pietermaritzburg South
Party	Candidate	Votes	%	±%
South African	William John O'Brien	891	67.8	+0.6
Labour	William Cox	424	32.2	−0.6
Majority		467	35.6	+1.2
Turnout		1,315	60.5	−7.1
South African hold		Swing	+0.6	

=== Umvoti ===
General election 1920: Umvoti
Party	Candidate	Votes	%	±%
South African	George Leuchars	726	59.7	+17.5
National	Adrian Izak Johannes Nel	490	40.3	+7.6
Majority		236	19.4	+9.9
Turnout		1,216	66.7	−12.5
South African hold		Swing	+5.0	

=== Vryheid ===
General election 1920: Vryheid
Party	Candidate	Votes	%	±%
South African	Joseph James Cheere Emmett	764	52.7	−8.1
National	Ernest George Jansen	683	47.3	+8.1
Majority		81	5.4	−16.2
Turnout		1,447	79.0	+20.5
South African hold		Swing	-8.1	

=== Weenen ===
General election 1920: Weenen
Party	Candidate	Votes	%	±%
South African	John William Moor	559	52.1	+0.3
Unionist	George Robert Richards	388	36.2	−12.0
Labour	Arthur Stephen Ratcliffe	125	11.7	New
Majority		171	15.9	+12.3
Turnout		1,072	58.4	−8.3
South African hold		Swing	+6.2	

=== Zululand ===
General election 1920: Zululand
Party	Candidate	Votes	%	±%
South African	George Heaton Nicholls	914	82.8	+4.2
National	Petrus Johannes Meyer	190	17.2	−4.2
Majority		724	65.6	N/A
Turnout		1,261	59.2	N/A
South African hold		Swing	N/A	

== Orange Free State ==
Party	Votes	%	Seats
National Party	22,208	67.60	16
South African Party	9,464	28.81	1
Labour Party	598	1.82	0
Unionist Party	584	1.78	0
Total	32,854	100.00	17
Source: Schoeman

=== Bethlehem ===
General election 1920: Bethlehem
Party	Candidate	Votes	%	±%
National	Johannes Henricus Brand Wessels	1,430	68.3	+1.7
South African	Oelof Abraham Izak Davel	665	31.7	−1.7
Majority		765	36.6	+3.4
Turnout		2,095	70.6	−1.3
National hold		Swing	+1.7	

=== Bloemfontein North ===
General election 1920: Bloemfontein North
Party	Candidate	Votes	%	±%
National	Johannes Wilhelmus Gysbert Steyn	894	43.1	New
Labour	Arthur Godfrey Barlow	598	28.8	New
Unionist	Herbert Francis Blaine	584	28.1	New
Majority		296	14.3	N/A
Turnout		2,076	66.5	N/A
National win (new seat)				

=== Bloemfontein South ===
General election 1920: Bloemfontein South
Party	Candidate	Votes	%	±%
South African	Deneys Reitz	967	52.8	New
National	Colin Fraser Steyn	866	47.2	New
Majority		101	5.6	N/A
Turnout		1,833	59.7	N/A
South African win (new seat)				

=== Boshof ===
General election 1920: Boshof
Party	Candidate	Votes	%	±%
National	Christiaan Andries van Niekerk	1,539	85.9	N/A
South African	Pieter Ernst Scholtz	253	14.1	New
Majority		1,286	71.8	N/A
Turnout		1,792	65.3	N/A
National hold		Swing	N/A	

=== Edenburg ===
General election 1920: Edenburg
Party	Candidate	Votes	%	±%
National	Fredrik William Beyers	1,287	75.8	+10.7
South African	Christoffel Jacobus Visser	412	24.2	−10.7
Majority		875	51.6	+21.4
Turnout		1,699	62.9	N/A
National hold		Swing	+10.7	

=== Fauresmith ===
General election 1920: Fauresmith
Party	Candidate	Votes	%	±%
National	Nicolaas Christiaan Havenga	1,441	69.5	+17.1
South African	Hendrik Frederik Deteloff Papenfus	633	30.5	−17.1
Majority		808	39.0	N/A
Turnout		2,074	71.2	N/A
National hold		Swing	+17.1	

=== Ficksburg ===
General election 1920: Ficksburg
Party	Candidate	Votes	%	±%
National	Jan Garhard Keyter	1,406	74.8	+6.9
South African	Christoffel Viljoen Botha	473	25.2	−6.9
Majority		933	49.6	+13.8
Turnout		1,879	63.6	−6.1
National hold		Swing	+6.9	

=== Frankfort ===
General election 1920: Frankfort
Party	Candidate	Votes	%	±%
National	Joahnnes Bernardus Wessels	1,358	67.4	+6.1
South African	Hermanus Nicolaas Wilhelmus Botha	658	32.6	−6.1
Majority		700	34.8	+12.2
Turnout		2,016	68.1	−5.0
National hold		Swing	+6.1	

=== Harrismith ===
General election 1920: Harrismith
Party	Candidate	Votes	%	±%
National	Zacharias Johannes de Beer	1,312	64.1	+9.5
South African	Johannes Petrus Gerhardus Steyl	736	35.9	−9.5
Majority		576	28.2	+19.0
Turnout		2,048	69.5	−8.0
National hold		Swing	+9.5	

=== Heilbron ===
General election 1920: Heilbron
Party	Candidate	Votes	%	±%
National	Marthinus Lourans Malan	1,458	69.9	+6.8
South African	Louis Jacobus Naudé	628	30.1	−6.8
Majority		830	39.8	+13.6
Turnout		2,086	69.7	−6.7
National hold		Swing	+6.8	

=== Hoopstad ===
General election 1920: Hoopstad
Party	Candidate	Votes	%	±%
National	Edwin Alfred Conroy	1,155	68.1	+5.3
South African	Pieter George Theron	540	31.9	−5.3
Majority		615	36.2	+10.6
Turnout		1,695	62.2	−11.4
National hold		Swing	+5.3	

=== Kroonstad ===
General election 1920: Kroonstad
Party	Candidate	Votes	%	±%
National	Albertus Johannes Werth	1,379	62.0	+8.8
South African	Hendrik Schalk Theron	846	38.0	−8.8
Majority		533	24.0	+17.6
Turnout		2,225	76.4	+0.2
National hold		Swing	+8.8	

=== Ladybrand ===
General election 1920: Ladybrand
Party	Candidate	Votes	%	±%
National	Charles Gustav Fichardt	1,129	60.7	−1.9
South African	Gideon Jacobus van Riet	731	39.3	+1.9
Majority		380	21.4	−3.8
Turnout		1,860	64.2	−0.1
National hold		Swing	-1.9	

=== Rouxville ===
General election 1920: Rouxville
Party	Candidate	Votes	%	±%
National	Daniël Hugo	1,367	75.3	+2.7
South African	George Louis Steytler	449	24.7	−2.7
Majority		918	50.6	+5.4
Turnout		1,816	62.1	−8.0
National hold		Swing	+2.7	

=== Smithfield ===
General election 1920: Smithfield
Party	Candidate	Votes	%	±%
National	James Barry Munnik Hertzog	1,613	89.1	+6.3
South African	Jacobus Lodewicus Botha	198	10.9	−6.3
Majority		1,415	78.2	+12.6
Turnout		1,811	69.1	−5.8
National hold		Swing	+6.3	

=== Vredefort ===
General election 1920: Vredefort
Party	Candidate	Votes	%	±%
National	Colin Fraser Steyn	1,205	65.3	+5.1
South African	Gert Hendrik Claassens	639	34.7	−5.1
Majority		566	30.6	+10.2
Turnout		1,844	63.1	−10.0
National hold		Swing	+5.1	

=== Winburg ===
General election 1920: Winburg
Party	Candidate	Votes	%	±%
National	Carl Theodorus Muller Wilcocks	1,369	68.3	+5.9
South African	Gabriel Rousseau Theron	636	31.7	−5.9
Majority		460	36.6	+11.8
Turnout		2,005	69.3	−8.1
National hold		Swing	+5.9	

== Transvaal ==
Party	Votes	%	Seats
National Party	35,374	36.81	12
South African Party	32,296	33.61	19
Labour Party	17,465	18.18	12
Unionist Party	9,578	9.97	5
Independent Socialist	67	0.07	0
Independents	1,307	1.36	1
Total	96,087	100.00	49
Source: Schoeman

Unopposed candidates: Unionists 1.

=== Barberton ===
General election 1920: Barberton
Party	Candidate	Votes	%	±%
South African	Joachim Christoffel Fourie	1,009	55.5	−12.8
National	Johannes Lodewicus Malan	809	44.5	+12.8
Majority		200	11.0	−25.6
Turnout		1,818	63.2	−5.1
South African hold		Swing	-12.8	

=== Benoni ===
General election 1920: Benoni
Party	Candidate	Votes	%	±%
Labour	Walter Bayley Madeley	1,114	51.2	−3.4
National	Hendrik Petrus Venter	653	30.1	+9.5
Unionist	George Rennie	331	15.2	New
Independent	William Henry Andrews	78	3.6	New
Majority		461	21.1	−8.7
Turnout		2,176	60.8	−16.5
Labour hold		Swing	-4.4	

=== Bethal ===
General election 1920: Bethal
Party	Candidate	Votes	%	±%
South African	Hendrik Stephanus Grobler	1,080	60.6	+0.9
National	Pieter Johannes Dirk Erasmus	702	39.4	−0.9
Majority		378	21.2	+1.8
Turnout		1,782	60.4	−15.8
South African hold		Swing	+0.9	

=== Bezuidenhout ===
General election 1920: Bezuidenhout
Party	Candidate	Votes	%	±%
Labour	William James McIntyre	1,031	49.7	+5.5
Unionist	Leslie Blackwell	810	39.0	−5.7
National	Edward Churchill Orsmond du Plooy	231	11.1	0.0
Majority		851	10.7	+10.2
Turnout		2,072	67.6	−10.5
Labour gain from Unionist		Swing	+5.6	

=== Boksburg ===
General election 1920: Boksburg
Party	Candidate	Votes	%	±%
Labour	John Joseph McMenamin	843	40.2	+1.3
Unionist	Joseph John Byron	824	39.3	−21.8
National	Petrus Jacobus Baird	428	20.4	New
Majority		19	0.9	N/A
Turnout		2,095	64.5	−11.9
Labour gain from Unionist		Swing	+10.2	

=== Brakpan ===
General election 1920: Brakpan
Party	Candidate	Votes	%	±%
National	John Henry Munnik	1,158	50.2	New
Labour	William Hills	808	35.0	New
South African	Desmond Swayne Leech	343	14.9	New
Majority		350	15.2	N/A
Turnout		2,309	71.2	N/A
National win (new seat)				

=== Christiana ===
General election 1920: Christiana
Party	Candidate	Votes	%	±%
National	Albert Stracham van Hees	1,277	66.4	New
South African	Jacobus Frederick de Beer	617	32.1	New
Independent	Albertus Johannes van der Merwe	29	1.5	New
Majority		610	34.3	N/A
Turnout		1,923	65.1	N/A
National win (new seat)				

=== Commissioner Street ===
General election 1920: Commissioner Street
Party	Candidate	Votes	%	±%
Labour	John Henry Scott Gow	838	49.7	+15.1
South African	William James Laite	791	46.9	−18.5
Independent	Sidney Percival Bunting	57	3.4	New
Majority		47	2.8	N/A
Turnout		1,686	55.3	−11.7
Labour gain from South African		Swing	+16.8	

=== Denver ===
General election 1920: Denver
Party	Candidate	Votes	%	±%
Labour	Thomas Edgar Drew	996	45.2	+13.0
Unionist	William James Parrack	667	30.2	−17.1
National	Stephanus Petrus van Wijk	541	24.5	+4.1
Majority		329	15.0	N/A
Turnout		2,204	69.8	−6.1
Labour gain from Unionist		Swing	+15.1	

=== Ermelo ===
General election 1920: Ermelo
Party	Candidate	Votes	%	±%
South African	William Richard Collins	1,334	61.6	−3.5
National	Paul Hendrik Nel	833	38.4	+3.5
Majority		501	23.2	−7.0
Turnout		2,167	73.0	−8.4
South African hold		Swing	-3.5	

=== Fordsburg ===
General election 1920: Fordsburg
Party	Candidate	Votes	%	±%
Labour	Morris Kentridge	804	45.2	+15.8
National	Jacobus Stephanus François Pretorius	592	33.3	+8.6
Unionist	Patrick Duncan	365	20.5	−25.4
Independent	Harry Martin Barendregt	19	1.1	New
Majority		212	11.9	N/A
Turnout		1,780	53.2	−18.2
Labour gain from Unionist		Swing	+20.6	

=== Germiston ===
General election 1920: Germiston
Party	Candidate	Votes	%	±%
Labour	George Brown	880	37.0	−7.3
National	Henry Harris Moll	844	35.5	New
Unionist	Hugh Steward McAlister	652	27.4	−28.3
Majority		36	1.5	N/A
Turnout		2,376	69.7	+0.7
Labour gain from Unionist		Swing	+10.5	

=== Heidelberg ===
General election 1920: Heidelberg
Party	Candidate	Votes	%	±%
South African	Willem Wouter Jacobus Johannes Bezuidenhout	940	51.1	−16.2
National	Marthinus Johannes Bekker	684	37.2	+4.5
Labour	Aaron David Berkowitz	214	11.6	New
Majority		750	13.9	−20.7
Turnout		1,838	64.2	−7.9
South African hold		Swing	-10.4	

=== Hospital ===
General election 1920: Hospital
Party	Candidate	Votes	%	±%
South African	Herbert Boshof Papenfus	734	35.4	−31.1
Labour	John Christie	556	26.8	+9.1
Unionist	John Weightman	428	20.6	New
National	Max Reiseberg	355	17.1	+1.3
Majority		950	8.6	−40.2
Turnout		2,073	65.6	−9.7
South African hold		Swing	-20.1	

=== Jeppes ===
General election 1920: Jeppes
Party	Candidate	Votes	%	±%
Labour	Henry William Sampson	1,257	83.3	+22.8
National	Coert Grobbelaar	156	10.3	New
Ind. Socialist	Charles Bertram Tyler	67	4.4	New
Unionist	Donald Urquhart	28	1.9	−37.6
Majority		1,101	73.0	N/A
Turnout		1,508	48.3	−22.7
Labour hold		Swing	N/A	

=== Johannesburg North ===
General election 1920: Johannesburg North
Party	Candidate	Votes	%	±%
South African	Lourens Geldenhuys	591	32.4	New
Labour	Charles Joseph McCann	467	25.6	New
National	Hendrik Andries Butler	458	25.1	New
Unionist	Joseph Cleve Sheridan	307	16.8	New
Majority		124	6.8	N/A
Turnout		1,823	64.4	N/A
South African win (new seat)				

=== Klerksdorp ===
General election 1920: Klerksdorp
Party	Candidate	Votes	%	±%
National	Jacobus Stephanus Smit	1,355	53.9	+8.0
South African	Johannes Adriaan Nesser	1,160	46.1	−8.0
Majority		195	7.8	N/A
Turnout		2,515	80.5	−2.1
National gain from South African		Swing	+8.0	

=== Krugersdorp ===
General election 1920: Krugersdorp
Party	Candidate	Votes	%	±%
Independent	Abe Bailey	875	37.4	−19.8
National	Bernardus Rudolf Hattingh	852	36.4	+10.4
Labour	Wynand Gerhardus Delport	614	26.2	+9.5
Majority		23	1.0	−30.2
Turnout		2,341	74.5	−1.9
Independent hold		Swing	-15.1	

=== Langlaagte ===
General election 1920: Langlaagte
Party	Candidate	Votes	%	±%
Unionist	Willie Rockey	752	40.0	−7.0
Labour	George Alexander Hay	649	34.5	+19.1
National	George de Meillon	479	25.5	−7.6
Majority		103	5.5	N/A
Turnout		1,880	61.7	−11.8
Unionist hold		Swing	N/A	

=== Lichtenburg ===
General election 1920: Lichtenburg
Party	Candidate	Votes	%	±%
National	Tielman Johannes de Villiers Roos	1,458	68.2	+7.5
South African	Johannes Gerhardus Cilliers	679	31.8	−7.5
Majority		779	36.4	+15.0
Turnout		2,137	72.6	−4.6
National hold		Swing	+7.5	

=== Losberg ===
General election 1920: Losberg
Party	Candidate	Votes	%	±%
South African	Theunis Frederik Jacobus Dreyer	1,292	59.8	−5.2
National	Johannes Jacobus Pienaar	868	40.2	+5.2
Majority		424	19.6	−10.4
Turnout		2,160	74.4	−8.4
South African hold		Swing	-5.2	

=== Lydenburg ===
General election 1920: Lydenburg
Party	Candidate	Votes	%	±%
South African	Jan Ludolf Shurink	986	56.0	−12.0
National	François Paul Hoogenhout	776	44.0	+12.0
Majority		210	12.0	−24.0
Turnout		1,762	63.5	−7.9
South African hold		Swing	-12.0	

=== Marico ===
General election 1920: Marico
Party	Candidate	Votes	%	±%
South African	Lodewyk Arnoldus Slabbert Lemmer	1,126	51.4	−11.7
National	Albertus Wynand de Waal	1,064	48.6	+11.7
Majority		62	2.8	−23.4
Turnout		2,190	74.9	+0.4
South African hold		Swing	-11.7	

=== Middelburg ===
General election 1920: Middelburg
Party	Candidate	Votes	%	±%
National	Jan Dirk Heyns	1,091	50.6	+6.7
South African	Jacob Letterstedt Hamman	1,065	49.4	−6.7
Majority		26	1.2	N/A
Turnout		2,156	74.9	−1.7
National gain from South African		Swing	+6.7	

=== Parktown ===
General election 1920: Parktown
Party	Candidate	Votes	%	±%
Unionist	Richard Feetham	Unopposed		
Unionist hold				

=== Pietersburg ===
General election 1920: Pietersburg
Party	Candidate	Votes	%	±%
National	Jozua François Naudé	996	55.6	New
South African	Theunis Johannes Kleinenberg	796	44.4	New
Majority		200	11.2	N/A
Turnout		1,792	67.9	N/A
National win (new seat)				

=== Potchefstroom ===
General election 1920: Potchefstroom
Party	Candidate	Votes	%	±%
South African	Nicolaas Jacobus de Wet	1,127	51.2	−5.6
National	Jacob Godfried Obermeyer	1,074	48.8	+5.6
Majority		53	2.4	−11.2
Turnout		2,201	69.8	−12.7
South African hold		Swing	-5.6	

=== Pretoria Central ===
General election 1920: Pretoria Central
Party	Candidate	Votes	%	±%
South African	Edward Rooth	1,263	59.2	−2.5
National	Hjalmar Reitz	551	25.8	+4.1
Labour	Philip Mark van Leer	320	15.0	−1.6
Independent	Robert Ashford Kerr	2	0.1	New
Majority		712	33.4	−6.6
Turnout		2,136	63.6	−13.8
South African hold		Swing	-3.3	

=== Pretoria District North ===
General election 1920: Pretoria District North
Party	Candidate	Votes	%	±%
South African	Thomas Major Cullinan	987	49.8	+0.6
National	Jan Abraham Joubert	976	49.2	−1.6
Independent	William Temple Nourse	20	1.0	New
Majority		11	0.6	N/A
Turnout		1,983	66.0	−11.1
South African gain from National		Swing	+1.1	

=== Pretoria District South ===
General election 1920: Pretoria District South
Party	Candidate	Votes	%	±%
National	Christiaan Hendrik Muller	987	51.0	+5.6
South African	Jacobus van der Walt	948	49.0	+0.5
Majority		39	2.0	N/A
Turnout		1,935	66.6	−14.0
National gain from South African		Swing	+2.6	

=== Pretoria East ===
General election 1920: Pretoria East
Party	Candidate	Votes	%	±%
Unionist	Constanine William Giovanetti	1,268	58.7	−2.6
National	William Fredeik Mondriaan	471	21.8	−4.6
Labour	George Hamilton McLean	416	19.3	+7.3
Independent	Grorge Louis Hutchinson	5	0.2	New
Majority		797	36.9	+2.0
Turnout		2,160	70.8	−5.9
Unionist hold		Swing	-1.0	

=== Pretoria West ===
General election 1920: Pretoria West
Party	Candidate	Votes	%	±%
South African	Jan Christiaan Smuts	1,720	68.8	+18.8
National	Johan Hendrik Schoeman	473	18.9	−17.8
Labour	Francis Herbert Blake	303	12.1	−1.2
Independent	Ralph Read		0.2	New
Majority		1,247	49.9	+36.6
Turnout		2,500	66.4	−16.4
South African hold		Swing	+18.3	

=== Roodepoort ===
General election 1920: Roodepoort
Party	Candidate	Votes	%	±%
Labour	John Mullineux	1,028	50.4	New
South African	Walter Adam	517	25.4	New
National	Johannes Andries Dieperink	493	24.2	New
Majority		511	25.0	N/A
Turnout		2,038	60.0	N/A
Labour win (new seat)				

=== Rustenburg ===
General election 1920: Rustenburg
Party	Candidate	Votes	%	±%
South African	Hendrik Nicolaas Jacobus van der Merwe	1,072	50.8	−11.1
National	Pieter Gert Wessel Grobler	1,038	49.2	+11.1
Majority		34	1.6	−22.2
Turnout		2,110	69.6	−9.5
South African hold		Swing	-11.1	

=== Soutpansberg ===
General election 1920: Soutpansberg
Party	Candidate	Votes	%	±%
South African	Hendrik Mentz	988	57.7	+3.1
National	Oswald Pirow	725	42.3	−3.1
Majority		263	15.4	+6.2
Turnout		1,713	62.9	−15.3
South African hold		Swing	+3.1	

=== Springs ===
General election 1920: Springs
Party	Candidate	Votes	%	±%
Labour	George Hills	1,100	53.6	+14.0
South African	Allister Mackintosh Miller	599	29.2	New
National	Annee Marius van Belkum	353	17.2	+5.0
Majority		501	24.4	N/A
Turnout		2,045	68.6	N/A
Labour gain from Unionist		Swing	N/A	

=== Standerton ===
General election 1920: Standerton
Party	Candidate	Votes	%	±%
South African	Gert Marthinus Claassen	1,045	70.8	N/A
National	Pieter Lafras Erasmus	430	29.2	New
Majority		615	41.6	N/A
Turnout		1,475	51.7	N/A
South African hold		Swing	N/A	

=== Troyeville ===
General election 1920: Troyeville
Party	Candidate	Votes	%	±%
Labour	Frederic Hugh Page Creswell	1,324	66.6	+24.9
Unionist	Oswald Austin Reid	664	33.4	−24.9
Majority		360	33.2	N/A
Turnout		1,988	64.9	−13.2
Labour gain from Unionist		Swing	+24.9	

=== Turffontein ===
General election 1920: Turffontein
Party	Candidate	Votes	%	±%
Labour	George Benjamin Steer	831	41.0	+9.1
Unionist	Hugh Archibald Wyndham	432	21.3	−33.0
South African	Edwin Watkin Hunt	401	19.8	New
National	Johann Hendrik Lodewyk Schumann	364	17.9	+4.1
Majority		399	19.7	N/A
Turnout		2,028	63.4	−13.2
Labour gain from Unionist		Swing	+21.1	

=== Ventersdorp ===
General election 1920: Ventersdorp
Party	Candidate	Votes	%	±%
South African	Barend Izak Jacobus van Heerden	1,025	52.0	New
National	Louis Joachim Boshoff	945	48.0	New
Majority		80	4.0	N/A
Turnout		1,970	70.7	N/A
South African win (new seat)				

=== Von Brandis ===
General election 1920: Von Brandis
Party	Candidate	Votes	%	±%
Unionist	Emile Nathan	1,064	67.0	+1.1
Labour	Thomas George Jones	525	33.0	−1.1
Majority		568	34.0	+2.2
Turnout		1,589	49.9	−20.9
Unionist hold		Swing	+1.1	

=== Vrededorp ===
General election 1920: Vrededorp
Party	Candidate	Votes	%	±%
National	Thomas Christoffel Visser	1,370	75.6	+35.2
South African	Wilhelm Pieter Pistorius	441	24.4	−18.5
Majority		929	51.2	N/A
Turnout		1,811	62.9	−17.8
National gain from South African		Swing	+26.9	

=== Wakkerstroom ===
General election 1920: Wakkerstroom
Party	Candidate	Votes	%	±%
South African	James van der Merwe	1,247	54.2	−9.8
National	Albert Kuit	1,053	45.8	+9.8
Majority		194	8.4	−19.6
Turnout		2,300	73.5	−4.6
South African hold		Swing	-9.8	

=== Waterberg ===
General election 1920: Waterberg
Party	Candidate	Votes	%	±%
National	Pieter Wynand le Roux van Niekerk	1,185	61.0	+10.9
South African	Filippus Fourie Pienaar	757	38.9	−10.9
Majority		458	22.0	+21.8
Turnout		1,942	72.3	−6.2
National hold		Swing	+10.9	

=== Witbank ===
General election 1920: Witbank
Party	Candidate	Votes	%	±%
National	Abraham Izak Emmanuel de Villiers	970	49.9	New
South African	Robert Eadie	726	37.4	New
Labour	Gerald Harding Kretzschmer	246	12.7	New
Majority		244	12.5	N/A
Turnout		1,942	65.2	N/A
National win (new seat)				

=== Witwatersberg ===
General election 1920: Witwatersberg
Party	Candidate	Votes	%	±%
South African	Nicolaas Jacobus Pretorius	895	50.4	−2.6
National	Theunis Christoffel Stoggberg	881	49.6	+2.6
Majority		14	0.8	−5.2
Turnout		1,776	68.7	−9.8
South African hold		Swing	-2.6	

=== Wolmaransstad ===
General election 1920: Wolmaransstad
Party	Candidate	Votes	%	±%
National	Jan Christoffel Greyling Kemp	1,162	66.0	+12.2
South African	Jacobus Johannes Hoffman	599	34.0	−12.3
Majority		563	32.0	+24.6
Turnout		1,761	65.1	−6.1
National hold		Swing	+12.3	

=== Wonderboom ===
General election 1920: Wonderboom
Party	Candidate	Votes	%	±%
National	Barend Jacobus Pienaar	1,213	57.7	New
South African	Joseph Francis Ludorf	590	28.0	New
Labour	James Ernest Riley	301	14.3	New
Majority		623	29.7	N/A
Turnout		2,104	69.2	N/A
National win (new seat)				

=== Yeoville ===
General election 1920: Yeoville
Party	Candidate	Votes	%	±%
Unionist	Alfred Edward Andrew Williamson	984	49.0	−31.9
South African	Richard Goldmann	806	40.1	New
Independent	Robert Lizard Weir	220	10.9	New
Majority		178	8.9	N/A
Turnout		2,010	65.6	−11.0
Unionist hold		Swing	N/A	

== Sources ==
- Schoeman, B.M. (1977). Parlementêre verkiesings in Suid-Afrika 1910-1976. Pretoria: Aktuele Publikasies.
- Standard Encyclopaedia of Southern Africa (1972). "House of Assembly" (vol. 5, pp. 617-636). Cape Town: Nasionale Opvoedkundige Uitgewery (Nasou).
- South Africa Government Gazette dated 1920-03-26 number 1036 (1920). pp. 767-770. Pretoria
