= Umvoti (House of Assembly of South Africa constituency) =

- Former constituency for the South African House of Assembly
- Province: Natal
- Electorate: 1,871 (1924)

Former constituency
- Created: 1910
- Abolished: 1929
- Number of members: 1
- Last MHA: W. A. Deane (SAP)
- Replaced by: Pietermaritzburg District

Umvoti was a constituency in the Natal Province of South Africa, which existed from 1910 to 1929. It covered a rural area surrounding Pietermaritzburg, the provincial capital. Throughout its existence it elected one member to the House of Assembly.

== Franchise notes ==
When the Union of South Africa was formed in 1910, the electoral qualifications in use in each pre-existing colony were kept in place. The franchise used in the Natal Colony, while theoretically not restricted by race, was significantly less liberal than that of the Cape, and no more than a few hundred non-white electors ever qualified. In 1908, an estimated 200 of the 22,786 electors in the colony were of non-European descent, and by 1935, only one remained. By 1958, when the last non-white voters in the Cape were taken off the rolls, Natal too had an all-white electorate. The franchise was also restricted by property and education qualifications until the 1933 general election, following the passage of the Women's Enfranchisement Act, 1930 and the Franchise Laws Amendment Act, 1931. From then on, the franchise was given to all white citizens aged 21 or over, which remained the case until the end of apartheid and the introduction of universal suffrage in 1994.

== History ==
As in most of Natal, the electorate of Umvoti was largely English-speaking and conservative. Its first MP was George Leuchars, who briefly served in cabinet under Louis Botha, before resigning in protest against the anti-British standpoints of J. B. M. Hertzog and others in Botha's cabinet. He continued to represent Umvoti until 1924, and in the subsequent by-election, his South African Party held the seat with William Arthur Deane, who had previously contested it as an independent in 1915. In 1929, Umvoti was abolished and largely replaced by the new Pietermaritzburg District seat, although Deane moved to Pietermaritzburg North and then the unified Pietermaritzburg seat, finally retiring from parliament in 1943.

== Members ==
Election	Member	Party
1910	George Leuchars	Independent
1915	George Leuchars	South African
1920	George Leuchars	South African
1921	George Leuchars	South African
1924 by	W. A. Deane	South African
1924	W. A. Deane	South African
1929	Constituency abolished	

== Detailed results ==
=== Elections in the 1910s ===
General election 1910: Umvoti
Party	Candidate	Votes	%	±%
Independent	George Leuchars	766	63.1	New
South African	W. A. Deane	447	36.9	New
Majority		319	26.2	N/A
Independent win (new seat)				

General election 1915: Umvoti
Party	Candidate	Votes	%	±%
South African	George Leuchars	636	42.2	−20.9
National	Ernest George Jansen	493	32.7	New
Independent	W. A. Deane	378	25.1	−11.8
Majority		143	9.5	N/A
Turnout		1,507	79.2	N/A
South African hold		Swing	N/A	

=== Elections in the 1920s ===
General election 1920: Umvoti
Party	Candidate	Votes	%	±%
South African	George Leuchars	726	59.7	+17.5
National	A. I. J. Nel	490	40.3	+7.6
Majority		236	19.4	+9.9
Turnout		1,216	66.7	−12.5
South African hold		Swing	+5.0	

General election 1921: Umvoti
Party	Candidate	Votes	%	±%
South African	George Leuchars	788	62.8	+3.1
National	A. I. J. Nel	459	36.6	−3.7
Independent	W. T. Tonkin	7	0.6	New
Majority		329	26.2	+6.8
Turnout		1,254	66.8	+0.1
South African hold		Swing	+3.4	

Umvoti by-election, 27 March 1924
Party	Candidate	Votes	%	±%
South African	W. A. Deane	654	46.3	−20.9
National	A. I. J. Nel	384	27.1	−5.7
Majority		270	19.2	−15.2
Turnout		1,413	58.8	−8.8
South African hold		Swing	-7.6	

General election 1924: Umvoti
Party	Candidate	Votes	%	±%
South African	W. A. Deane	873	56.7	−6.1
Independent	G. H. Hulett	664	43.1	New
Rejected ballots		3	0.2	N/A
Majority		209	13.6	N/A
Turnout		1,540	82.3	+15.5
South African hold		Swing	N/A	
