= Ficksburg (House of Assembly of South Africa constituency) =

- Former constituency for the South African House of Assembly
- Province: Orange Free State
- Electorate: 3,070 (1924)

Former constituency
- Created: 1910
- Abolished: 1929
- Number of members: 1
- Last MHA: J. G. Keyter (NP)

Ficksburg was a constituency in the Orange Free State Province of South Africa, which existed from 1910 to 1929. Named after the town of Ficksburg, the seat covered a rural area in the southeast of the province, along the border with Lesotho. Throughout its existence it elected one member to the House of Assembly.

== Franchise notes ==
When the Union of South Africa was formed in 1910, the electoral qualifications in use in each pre-existing colony were kept in place. In the Orange River Colony, and its predecessor the Orange Free State, the vote was restricted to white men, and as such, elections in the Orange Free State Province were held on a whites-only franchise from the beginning. The franchise was also restricted by property and education qualifications until the 1933 general election, following the passage of the Women's Enfranchisement Act, 1930 and the Franchise Laws Amendment Act, 1931. From then on, the franchise was given to all white citizens aged 21 or over. Non-whites remained disenfranchised until the end of apartheid and the introduction of universal suffrage in 1994.

== History ==
Ficksburg, like most of the Orange Free State, was a highly conservative seat throughout its existence and had a largely Afrikaans-speaking electorate. It was held throughout its existence by Jan Gerhard Keyter, who initially represented the provincial Orangia Unie party, but joined the National Party when J. B. M. Hertzog founded it in 1914. The constituency was very safe for the NP, as were most rural Free State seats, but unlike some of them, it never went unopposed. It was abolished in 1929, at which point Keyter retired from parliament.

== Members ==
Election	Member	Party
1910	J. G. Keyter	Orangia Unie
1915	J. G. Keyter	National
1920	J. G. Keyter	National
1921	J. G. Keyter	National
1924	J. G. Keyter	National
1929	constituency abolished	

== Detailed results ==
=== Elections in the 1910s ===
General election 1910: Ficksburg
Party	Candidate	Votes	%	±%
Orangia Unie	J. G. Keyter	993	70.4	New
Independent	C. Newberry	418	29.6	New
Majority		575	40.8	N/A
Orangia Unie win (new seat)				

General election 1915: Ficksburg
Party	Candidate	Votes	%	±%
National	J. G. Keyter	1,220	67.9	−3.5
South African	C. F. R. von Maltitz	576	32.1	N/A
Majority		644	35.8	N/A
Turnout		1,796	69.7	N/A
National hold		Swing	N/A	

=== Elections in the 1920s ===
General election 1920: Ficksburg
Party	Candidate	Votes	%	±%
National	J. G. Keyter	1,406	74.8	+6.9
South African	C. V. Botha	473	25.2	−6.9
Majority		933	49.6	+13.8
Turnout		1,879	63.6	−6.1
National hold		Swing	+6.9	

General election 1921: Ficksburg
Party	Candidate	Votes	%	±%
National	J. G. Keyter	1,551	77.7	+2.9
South African	P. J. F. Krog	446	22.3	−2.9
Majority		1,105	55.4	+5.8
Turnout		1,997	64.8	+1.2
National hold		Swing	+2.9	

General election 1924: Ficksburg
Party	Candidate	Votes	%	±%
National	J. G. Keyter	1,844	79.4	+1.7
South African	C. F. R. von Maltitz	442	19.0	−3.3
Rejected ballots		36	1.6	N/A
Majority		1,402	60.4	+5.0
Turnout		2,322	75.6	+10.8
National hold		Swing	+2.5	
