= Ventersdorp (House of Assembly of South Africa constituency) =

Former constituency in Transvaal Province, South Africa

- Former constituency for the South African House of Assembly
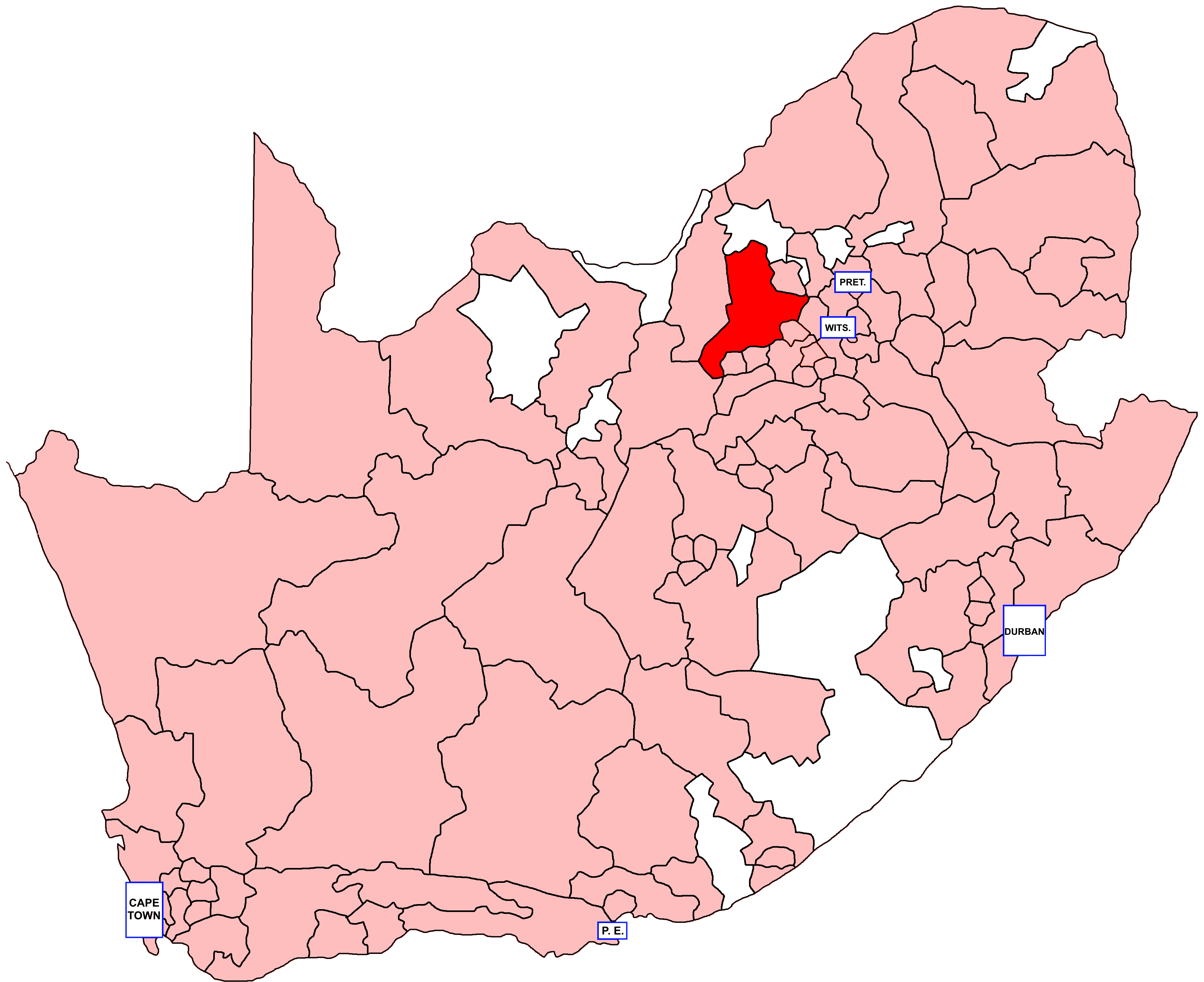
- Location of Ventersdorp within South Africa (1981)
- Province: Transvaal
- Electorate: 16,911 (1989)

Former constituency
- Created: 1920; 1981
- Abolished: 1966; 1994
- Number of members: 1
- Last MHA: S. P. van Vuuren (CP)
- Replaced by: Carletonville (1966); North West (1994)

Ventersdorp was a constituency in the Transvaal Province of South Africa, which existed from 1920 to 1966 and again from 1981 to 1994. Named after the town of Ventersdorp, it covered a rural area in the western Transvaal. Throughout its existence it elected one member to the House of Assembly and one to the Transvaal Provincial Council.

== Franchise notes ==
When the Union of South Africa was formed in 1910, the electoral qualifications in use in each pre-existing colony were kept in place. In the Transvaal Colony, and its predecessor the South African Republic, the vote was restricted to white men, and as such, elections in the Transvaal Province were held on a whites-only franchise from the beginning. The franchise was also restricted by property and education qualifications until the 1933 general election, following the passage of the Women's Enfranchisement Act, 1930 and the Franchise Laws Amendment Act, 1931. From then on, the franchise was given to all white citizens aged 21 or over. Non-whites remained disenfranchised until the end of apartheid and the introduction of universal suffrage in 1994.

== History ==
Like most of the rural Transvaal, Ventersdorp was a conservative seat with a largely Afrikaans-speaking electorate. In its early years it was a marginal seat, with the South African and National parties fighting several close contests, but that era ended with the election of independent Jacob Wilkens in 1933. Wilkens was re-elected in 1938 for the United Party, but left that party alongside J. B. M. Hertzog in 1939, and was defeated for re-election by a new UP candidate in 1943. He returned one final time in 1948, this time for the Herenigde Nasionale Party, which took the seat as part of their sweep of the rural Transvaal. In 1966, the constituency was abolished and its MP, Johannes Casper Greyling, moved to the new seat of Carletonville.

Ventersdorp was recreated in 1981, and won by Benjamin Hugh Wilkens for the National Party, but in 1987 it was one of many rural Transvaal seats to fall to Andries Treurnicht's new hard-right Conservative Party. Stefanus Petrus van Vuuren, the Conservative MP elected in 1987, would represent Ventersdorp until the end of apartheid.

== Members ==
Election	Member	Party
1920	B. I. J. van Heerden	South African
1921	B. I. J. van Heerden	South African
1924	L. J. Boshoff	National
1929	L. J. Boshoff	National
1933	Jacob Wilkens	Independent
1938	Jacob Wilkens	United
1939	Jacob Wilkens	HNP
1943	H. J. Visser	United
1948	Jacob Wilkens	HNP
1953	J. C. Greyling	National
1958	J. C. Greyling	National
1961	J. C. Greyling	National
1966	Constituency abolished	

Election	Member	Party
1981	B. H. Wilkens	National
1987	S. P. van Vuuren	Conservative
1989	S. P. van Vuuren	Conservative
1994	Constituency abolished	

== Detailed results ==
=== Elections in the 1920s ===
General election 1920: Ventersdorp
Party	Candidate	Votes	%	±%
South African	B. I. J. van Heerden	1,025	52.0	New
National	L. J. Boshoff	945	48.0	New
Majority		80	4.0	N/A
Turnout		1,970	70.7	N/A
South African win (new seat)				

General election 1921: Ventersdorp
Party	Candidate	Votes	%	±%
South African	B. I. J. van Heerden	1,124	51.9	−0.1
National	L. J. Boshoff	1,042	48.1	+0.1
Majority		82	3.8	−0.2
Turnout		2,166	71.0	+0.3
South African hold		Swing	-0.1	

General election 1924: Ventersdorp
Party	Candidate	Votes	%	±%
National	L. J. Boshoff	1,126	52.3	+4.2
South African	B. I. J. van Heerden	1,025	47.6	−4.3
Rejected ballots		3	0.1	N/A
Majority		101	4.7	N/A
Turnout		2,154	83.6	+12.6
National gain from South African		Swing	+4.3	

General election 1929: Ventersdorp
Party	Candidate	Votes	%	±%
National	L. J. Boshoff	1,245	52.4	+0.1
South African	C. H. Mostert	1,127	47.4	−0.2
Rejected ballots		6	0.2	+0.1
Majority		118	5.0	+0.3
Turnout		2,378	85.4	+1.8
National hold		Swing	+0.2	

=== Elections in the 1930s ===
General election 1933: Ventersdorp
Party	Candidate	Votes	%	±%
Independent	Jacob Wilkens	2,776	59.9	New
National	J. J. L. Wernich	1,822	39.3	−13.1
Roos	E. A. Papendorf	6	0.1	New
Rejected ballots		33	0.7	+0.5
Majority		954	20.6	N/A
Turnout		4,637	80.6	−4.8
Independent gain from National		Swing	N/A	

General election 1938: Ventersdorp
Party	Candidate	Votes	%	±%
United	Jan Wilkens	2,838	60.7	+0.8
Purified National	M. C. Eloff	1,822	38.9	New
Rejected ballots		19	0.4	-0.3
Majority		1,016	21.7	N/A
Turnout		4,679	88.2	+7.6
		Swing	N/A	
