= Johannesburg North (House of Assembly of South Africa constituency) =

- Former constituency for the South African House of Assembly
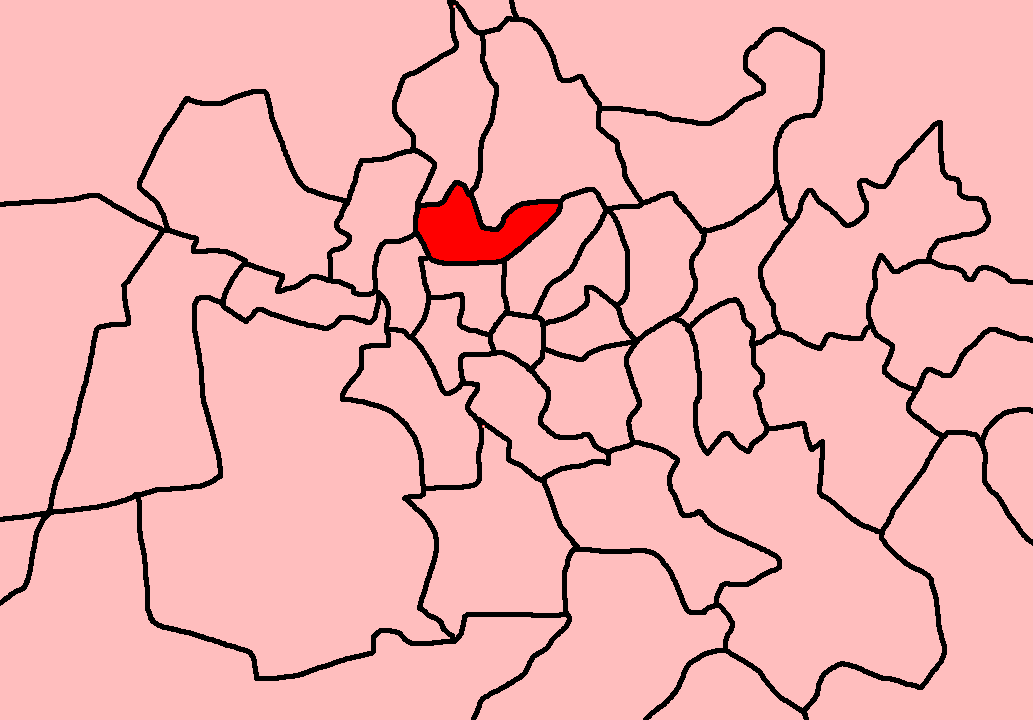
- Location of Johannesburg North within the Witwatersrand (1981)
- Province: Transvaal
- Electorate: 19,114 (1989)

Former constituency
- Created: 1920
- Abolished: 1994
- Number of members: 1
- Last MHA: P. G. Soal (DP)
- Replaced by: Gauteng

Johannesburg North (Afrikaans: Johannesburg-Noord) was a constituency in the Transvaal Province of South Africa, which existed from 1920 to 1994. As the name indicates, it covered parts of the northern suburbs of Johannesburg. Throughout its existence it elected one member to the House of Assembly and one to the Transvaal Provincial Council.

== Franchise notes ==
When the Union of South Africa was formed in 1910, the electoral qualifications in use in each pre-existing colony were kept in place. In the Transvaal Colony, and its predecessor the South African Republic, the vote was restricted to white men, and as such, elections in the Transvaal Province were held on a whites-only franchise from the beginning. The franchise was also restricted by property and education qualifications until the 1933 general election, following the passage of the Women's Enfranchisement Act, 1930 and the Franchise Laws Amendment Act, 1931. From then on, the franchise was given to all white citizens aged 21 or over. Non-whites remained disenfranchised until the end of apartheid and the introduction of universal suffrage in 1994.

== History ==
Like most of Johannesburg's northern suburbs, Johannesburg North had a largely English-speaking and liberal electorate. It was a safe seat for each main pro-British party in South Africa, first the Unionists, then the South African Party and finally the United Party. Its most notable MP during this era was Jan Hendrik Hofmeyr, cabinet minister and close ally of Jan Smuts, who died just a few months after Smuts and the UP lost the 1948 general election. His successor, Bailey Bekker, was kicked out of the UP in 1954 for proposing a compromise with the government over the Coloured vote question, and founded the short-lived centrist National Conservative Party. The party went nowhere and Bekker retired at the 1958 general election, which was won handily by the UP candidate.

In 1974, Johannesburg North was one of five seats lost by the UP to the growing Progressive Party, which took a clearer stance against apartheid and folded into the Progressive Federal Party after the UP's dissolution in 1977. The PFP and their successors, the Democratic Party, held the seat by strong margins until the end of apartheid.

== Members ==
Election	Member	Party
1920	Lourens Geldenhuys	SAP
1921	Lourens Geldenhuys	SAP
1924	Lourens Geldenhuys	SAP
1929	Lourens Geldenhuys	SAP
1929 by	Jan Hendrik Hofmeyr	SAP
1933	Jan Hendrik Hofmeyr	SAP
1934	Jan Hendrik Hofmeyr	United
1938	Jan Hendrik Hofmeyr	United
1943	Jan Hendrik Hofmeyr	United
1948	Jan Hendrik Hofmeyr	United
1949 by	P. B. Bekker	United
1953	P. B. Bekker	United
1954	P. B. Bekker	NCP
1958	R. P. Plewman	United
1961	U. M. Weiss	United
1966	D. J. Marais	United
1970	D. J. Marais	United
1974	Gordon Herbert Waddelll	Progressive
1977	J. F. Marais	PFP
1981	J. F. Marais	PFP
1987	P. G. Soal	PFP
1989	P. G. Soal	Democratic
1994	Constituency abolished	

== Detailed results ==
=== Elections in the 1920s ===
General election 1920: Johannesburg North
Party	Candidate	Votes	%	±%
South African	Lourens Geldenhuys	591	32.4	New
Labour	C. J. McCann	467	25.6	New
National	H. A. Butler	458	25.1	New
Unionist	J. C. Sheridan	307	16.8	New
Majority		124	6.8	N/A
Turnout		1,823	64.4	N/A
South African win (new seat)				

General election 1921: Johannesburg North
Party	Candidate	Votes	%	±%
South African	Lourens Geldenhuys	1,215	60.4	+28.0
National	H. A. Butler	797	39.6	+14.5
Majority		418	20.8	N/A
Turnout		2,012	64.9	+0.5
South African hold		Swing	N/A	

General election 1924: Johannesburg North
Party	Candidate	Votes	%	±%
South African	Lourens Geldenhuys	1,340	52.1	−8.3
Labour	J. Duthie	1,216	47.3	New
Rejected ballots		14	0.6	N/A
Majority		124	4.8	N/A
Turnout		2,570	78.3	+13.4
South African hold		Swing	N/A	

General election 1929: Johannesburg North
Party	Candidate	Votes	%	±%
South African	Lourens Geldenhuys	1,220	49.8	−2.3
Labour (Creswell)	J. Duthie	1,219	49.7	+2.4
Rejected ballots		13	0.5	-0.1
Majority		1	0.1	−4.7
Turnout		2,452	81.8	+3.5
South African hold		Swing	-2.4	

Johannesburg North by-election, 23 October 1929
Party	Candidate	Votes	%	±%
South African	Jan Hendrik Hofmeyr	1,553	55.0	+5.2
Labour (Creswell)	J. Duthie	1,248	44.2	−5.5
Rejected ballots		25	0.8	+0.3
Majority		305	10.8	+10.7
Turnout		2,826	92.3	+10.5
South African hold		Swing	+5.4	

=== Elections in the 1930s ===
General election 1933: Johannesburg North
Party	Candidate	Votes	%	±%
South African	Jan Hendrik Hofmeyr	Unopposed		
South African hold				

General election 1938: Johannesburg North
Party	Candidate	Votes	%	±%
United	Jan Hendrik Hofmeyr	4,721	76.6	N/A
Purified National	A. H. Swartz	1,387	22.5	New
Rejected ballots		53	0.9	N/A
Majority		3,334	54.1	N/A
Turnout		6,161	74.6	N/A
United hold		Swing	N/A	
