= Troyeville (House of Assembly of South Africa constituency) =

- Former constituency for the South African House of Assembly
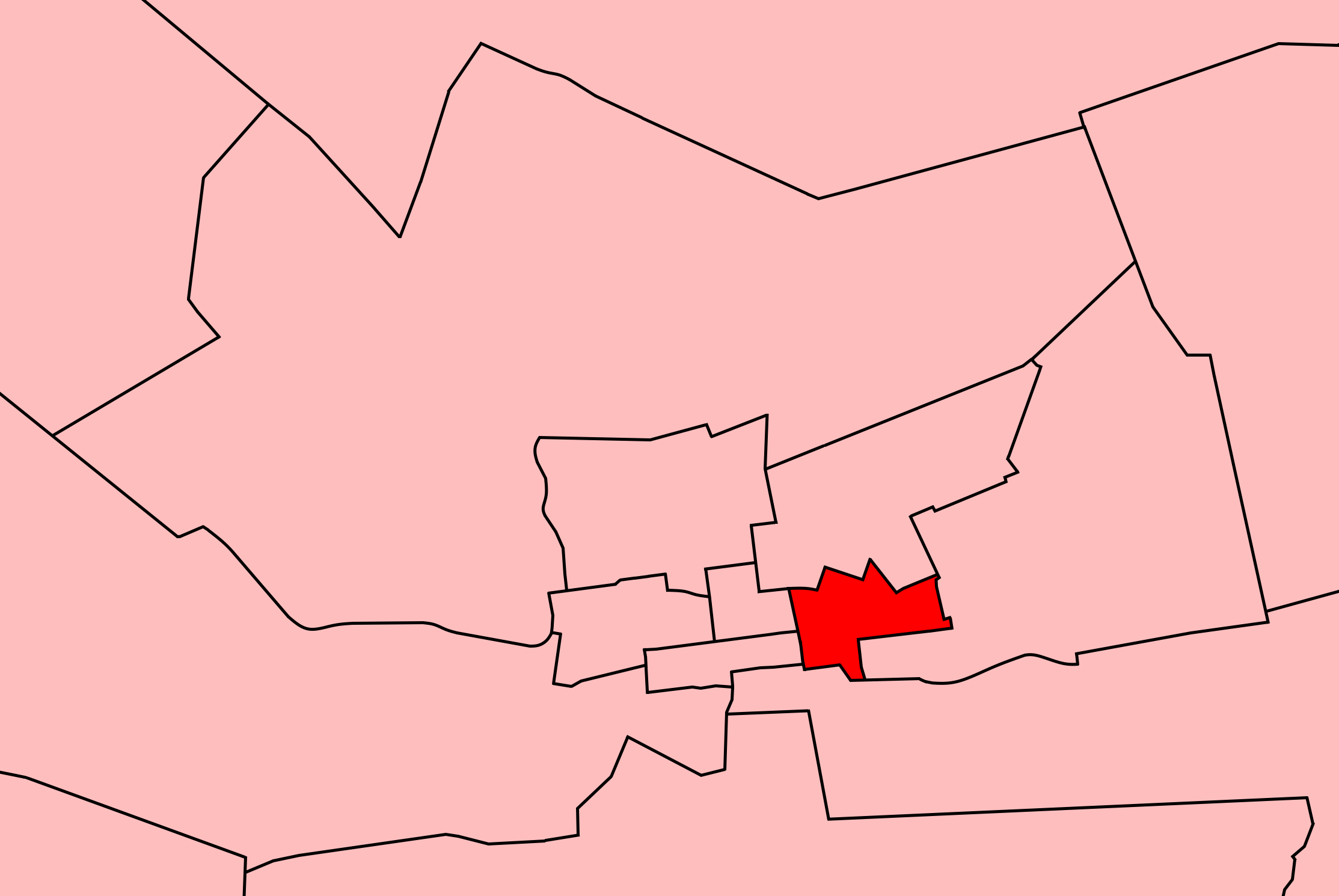
- Location of Troyeville within Johannesburg (1910)
- Province: Transvaal
- Electorate: 9,778 (1948)

Former constituency
- Created: 1910
- Abolished: 1958
- Number of members: 1
- Last MHA: Morris Kentridge (UP)

Troyeville was a constituency in the Transvaal Province of South Africa, which existed from 1910 to 1958. It covered a part of the inner eastern suburbs of Johannesburg, centred on the suburb of Troyeville. Throughout its existence it elected one member to the House of Assembly and one to the Transvaal Provincial Council.

== Franchise notes ==
When the Union of South Africa was formed in 1910, the electoral qualifications in use in each pre-existing colony were kept in place. In the Transvaal Colony, and its predecessor the South African Republic, the vote was restricted to white men, and as such, elections in the Transvaal Province were held on a whites-only franchise from the beginning. The franchise was also restricted by property and education qualifications until the 1933 general election, following the passage of the Women's Enfranchisement Act, 1930 and the Franchise Laws Amendment Act, 1931. From then on, the franchise was given to all white citizens aged 21 or over. Non-whites remained disenfranchised until the end of apartheid and the introduction of universal suffrage in 1994.

== History ==
Troyeville was a largely working-class constituency, and followed the general trend of such areas across South Africa's major cities. Its first MP, John William Quinn of the Unionist Party, left parliament in 1915, and the resulting by-election (not held until 1917) was won by Frederic Creswell, the leader of the Labour Party, who had lost his seat in Bezuidenhout at the previous general election. Creswell represented Troyeville until 1921, when he was defeated by the recently-reunited South African Party, and would represent three more constituencies through his long parliamentary career. At the 1924 election, Labour retook the seat with Morris Kentridge, who would represent Troyeville until the abolition of the constituency in 1958, after defecting to the SAP in 1933 and joining the United Party on that party's formation. Having already served intermittently in parliament starting in 1914, Kentridge retired from politics on his seat's abolition. His son, Sydney Kentridge, became a notable defence lawyer and anti-apartheid activist, defending Nelson Mandela in the 1956 Treason Trial and representing Steve Biko's family at the inquest into his death in 1978.

== Members ==
Election	Member	Party
1910	John William Quinn	Unionist
1915	John William Quinn	Unionist
1917 by	Frederic Creswell	Labour
1920	Frederic Creswell	Labour
1921	W. S. Webber	South African
1924	Morris Kentridge	Labour
1929	Morris Kentridge	Labour
1933	Morris Kentridge	South African
1934	Morris Kentridge	United
1938	Morris Kentridge	United
1943	Morris Kentridge	United
1948	Morris Kentridge	United
1953	Morris Kentridge	United
1958	Constituency abolished	

== Detailed results ==
=== Elections in the 1910s ===
General election 1910: Troyeville
Party	Candidate	Votes	%	±%
Unionist	J. W. Quinn	1,172	59.9	New
Het Volk	G. A. Mulligan	785	40.1	New
Majority		387	19.8	N/A
Unionist win (new seat)				

General election 1915: Troyeville
Party	Candidate	Votes	%	±%
Unionist	J. W. Quinn	1,119	58.3	−1.6
Independent Labour	Arthur Barlow	802	41.7	New
Majority		317	16.6	N/A
Turnout		1,921	78.1	N/A
Unionist hold		Swing	N/A	

Troyeville by-election, 26 January 1917
Party	Candidate	Votes	%	±%
Labour	Frederic Creswell	Unopposed		
Labour gain from Unionist				

=== Elections in the 1920s ===
General election 1920: Troyeville
Party	Candidate	Votes	%	±%
Labour	Frederic Creswell	1,324	66.6	+24.9
Unionist	O. A. Reid	664	33.4	−24.9
Majority		360	33.2	N/A
Turnout		1,988	64.9	−13.2
Labour gain from Unionist		Swing	+24.9	

General election 1921: Troyeville
Party	Candidate	Votes	%	±%
South African	W. S. Webber	1,192	55.0	New
Labour	Frederic Creswell	976	45.0	−21.6
Majority		216	10.0	N/A
Turnout		2,168	68.3	+3.4
South African gain from Labour		Swing	N/A	

General election 1924: Troyeville
Party	Candidate	Votes	%	±%
Labour	Morris Kentridge	1,217	53.6	+8.6
South African	W. S. Webber	995	43.8	−11.2
Independent	W. E. Bleloch	54	2.4	New
Rejected ballots		6	0.2	N/A
Majority		222	9.8	N/A
Turnout		2,272	80.3	+12.0
Labour gain from South African		Swing	+9.9	

General election 1929: Troyeville
Party	Candidate	Votes	%	±%
Labour (N.C.)	Morris Kentridge	1,452	57.5	+3.9
South African	F. H. Thompson	993	39.3	−4.5
Independent	S. W. Fussell	65	2.6	New
Rejected ballots		14	0.6	+0.4
Majority		459	18.2	+8.4
Turnout		2,524	77.9	−2.4
Labour hold		Swing	+4.2	

=== Elections in the 1930s ===
General election 1933: Troyeville
Party	Candidate	Votes	%	±%
South African	Morris Kentridge	Unopposed		
South African hold				

General election 1938: Troyeville
Party	Candidate	Votes	%	±%
United	Morris Kentridge	3,818	72.3	N/A
Labour	D. H. Epstein	1,375	26.0	New
Rejected ballots		86	1.7	N/A
Majority		1,913	46.3	N/A
Turnout		5,179	70.4	N/A
United hold		Swing	N/A	
