= Pietersburg (House of Assembly of South Africa constituency) =

- Former constituency for the South African House of Assembly
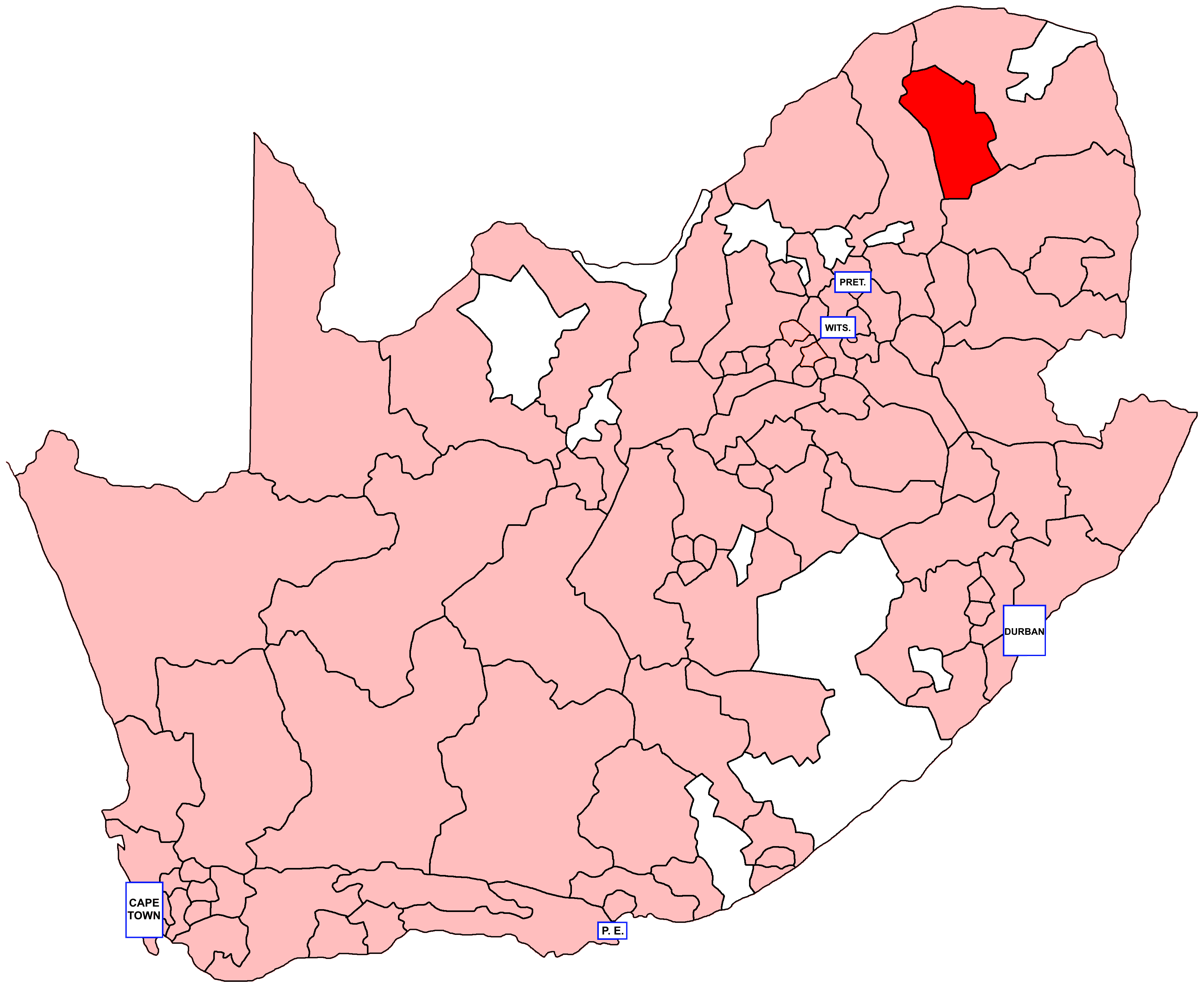
- Location of Pietersburg within South Africa (1981)
- Province: Transvaal
- Electorate: 22,800 (1989)

Former constituency
- Created: 1920
- Abolished: 1994
- Number of members: 1
- Last MHA: W. J. Snyman (CP)
- Replaced by: Limpopo

Pietersburg was a constituency in the Transvaal Province of South Africa, which existed from 1920 to 1994. Named after the town of Pietersburg (now Polokwane), it covered a rural area in the northern Transvaal. Throughout its existence it elected one member to the House of Assembly and one to the Transvaal Provincial Council.

== Franchise notes ==
When the Union of South Africa was formed in 1910, the electoral qualifications in use in each pre-existing colony were kept in place. In the Transvaal Colony, and its predecessor the South African Republic, the vote was restricted to white men, and as such, elections in the Transvaal Province were held on a whites-only franchise from the beginning. The franchise was also restricted by property and education qualifications until the 1933 general election, following the passage of the Women's Enfranchisement Act, 1930 and the Franchise Laws Amendment Act, 1931. From then on, the franchise was given to all white citizens aged 21 or over. Non-whites remained disenfranchised until the end of apartheid and the introduction of universal suffrage in 1994.

== History ==
Like most of the rural Transvaal, Pietersburg had a largely Afrikaans-speaking electorate. For most of its history, it was a stronghold of the National Party, and for the first forty years of its existence, it was represented by a single MP - Tom Naudé, who was first elected on the seat's creation in 1920 and only left on his elevation to the Senate in 1960. During his time in the lower house, he served as Chief Whip, Speaker, and finally as a cabinet minister in all Nationalist governments from 1950 until 1961. He finished his career as President of the Senate, in which role he acted as State President following the death of State President-elect Eben Dönges in 1967.

Following Naudé's retirement, Pietersburg stayed a loyal Nationalist seat, but in 1982, its MP, Willem Jacobus Snyman, joined Andries Treurnicht's new Conservative Party, and was re-elected under that label at every subsequent election until the fall of apartheid.

== Members ==
Election	Member	Party
1920	Tom Naudé	National
1921	Tom Naudé	National
1924	Tom Naudé	National
1929	Tom Naudé	National
1933	Tom Naudé	National
1934	Tom Naudé	United
1938	Tom Naudé	United
1939	Tom Naudé	HNP
1943	Tom Naudé	HNP
1948	Tom Naudé	HNP
1953	Tom Naudé	National
1958	Tom Naudé	National
1961	F. J. Niemand	National
1966	A. S. D. Erasmus	National
1970	A. S. D. Erasmus	National
1974	A. S. D. Erasmus	National
1975 by	W. J. Snyman	National
1977	W. J. Snyman	National
1981	W. J. Snyman	National
1982	W. J. Snyman	Conservative
1987	W. J. Snyman	Conservative
1989	W. J. Snyman	Conservative
1994	Constituency abolished	

== Detailed results ==
=== Elections in the 1920s ===
General election 1920: Pietersburg
Party	Candidate	Votes	%	±%
National	Tom Naudé	996	55.6	New
South African	T. J. Kleinenberg	796	44.4	New
Majority		200	11.2	N/A
Turnout		1,792	67.9	N/A
National win (new seat)				

General election 1921: Pietersburg
Party	Candidate	Votes	%	±%
National	Tom Naudé	1,108	55.0	−0.6
South African	G. P. C. Kotzé	905	45.0	+0.6
Majority		203	10.0	−1.2
Turnout		2,013	69.2	+1.3
National hold		Swing	-0.6	

General election 1924: Pietersburg
Party	Candidate	Votes	%	±%
National	Tom Naudé	1,293	56.4	+1.4
South African	P. J. Naudé	990	43.2	−1.8
Rejected ballots		11	0.4	N/A
Majority		303	13.2	+3.2
Turnout		2,294	76.9	+7.7
National hold		Swing	+1.6	

General election 1929: Pietersburg
Party	Candidate	Votes	%	±%
National	Tom Naudé	1,297	59.0	+2.6
South African	B. G. L. Enslin	890	40.5	−2.7
Rejected ballots		13	0.5	+0.1
Majority		407	18.5	+5.3
Turnout		2,200	85.3	+8.4
National hold		Swing	+2.7	

=== Elections in the 1930s ===
General election 1933: Pietersburg
Party	Candidate	Votes	%	±%
National	Tom Naudé	2,500	68.2	+9.2
Independent	S. T. Davis	1,133	30.9	New
Rejected ballots		35	0.9	+0.4
Majority		1,367	37.3	N/A
Turnout		3,668	71.5	−13.8
National hold		Swing	N/A	

General election 1938: Pietersburg
Party	Candidate	Votes	%	±%
United	Tom Naudé	2,391	53.8	−14.4
Purified National	C. Hofmeyr	2,004	45.1	New
Rejected ballots		47	1.1	+0.2
Majority		387	8.7	N/A
Turnout		4,442	83.4	+11.9
United hold		Swing	N/A	
