= Natal Coast (House of Assembly of South Africa constituency) =

- Natalse Kus
- Former constituency for the South African House of Assembly
- Province: Natal
- Electorate: 4,005 (1933)

Former constituency
- Created: 1920
- Abolished: 1938
- Number of members: 1
- Last MHA: L. F. Reynolds (UP)
- Replaced by: Natal South Coast

Natal Coast (Afrikaans: Natalse Kus) was a constituency in the Natal Province of South Africa, which existed from 1920 to 1938. As the name implies, it covered an area along the coast of the province. Throughout its existence it elected one member to the House of Assembly.

== Franchise notes ==
When the Union of South Africa was formed in 1910, the electoral qualifications in use in each pre-existing colony were kept in place. The franchise used in the Natal Colony, while theoretically not restricted by race, was significantly less liberal than that of the Cape, and no more than a few hundred non-white electors ever qualified. In 1908, an estimated 200 of the 22,786 electors in the colony were of non-European descent, and by 1935, only one remained. By 1958, when the last non-white voters in the Cape were taken off the rolls, Natal too had an all-white electorate. The franchise was also restricted by property and education qualifications until the 1933 general election, following the passage of the Women's Enfranchisement Act, 1930 and the Franchise Laws Amendment Act, 1931. From then on, the franchise was given to all white citizens aged 21 or over, which remained the case until the end of apartheid and the introduction of universal suffrage in 1994.

== History ==
As in the rest of Natal, Natal Coast's electorate was largely English-speaking and conservative. It was held at every election by the South African Party, which dominated Natal politics through the 1920s, and went unopposed in two of its five general elections. In 1938, it was redrawn and renamed Natal South Coast, and its MP, Lewis Frank Reynolds, retired from parliament.

== Members ==
Election	Member	Party
1920	E. G. A. Saunders	South African
1921	E. G. A. Saunders	South African
1924	William Arnott	South African
1929	William Arnott	South African
1930 by	L. F. Reynolds	South African
1933	L. F. Reynolds	South African
1934	L. F. Reynolds	United
1938	Constituency abolished	

== Detailed results ==
=== Elections in the 1920s ===
General election 1920: Natal Coast
Party	Candidate	Votes	%	±%
South African	E. G. A. Saunders	654	58.3	New
Labour	J. R. Royston	300	26.7	New
Independent	N. P. Palmer	168	15.0	New
Majority		354	31.6	N/A
Turnout		1,122	54.4	N/A
South African win (new seat)				

General election 1921: Natal Coast
Party	Candidate	Votes	%	±%
South African	E. G. A. Saunders	Unopposed		
South African hold				

General election 1924: Natal Coast
Party	Candidate	Votes	%	±%
South African	William Arnott	1,057	79.4	N/A
Independent	P. A. Silburn	250	18.8	New
Rejected ballots		24	1.8	N/A
Majority		807	60.6	N/A
Turnout		1,331	67.1	N/A
South African hold		Swing	N/A	

General election 1929: Natal Coast
Party	Candidate	Votes	%	±%
South African	William Arnott	Unopposed		
South African hold				

Natal Coast by-election, 12 March 1930
Party	Candidate	Votes	%	±%
South African	L. F. Reynolds	1,608	83.2	N/A
National	T. K. M. Pringle	308	15.9	New
Rejected ballots		17	0.9	N/A
Majority		1,300	67.3	N/A
Turnout		1,933	77.6	N/A
South African hold		Swing	N/A	

=== Elections in the 1930s ===
General election 1933: Natal Coast
Party	Candidate	Votes	%	±%
South African	L. F. Reynolds	2,232	55.7	N/A
Natal Home Rule Party	N. P. Palmer	1,750	43.7	New
Rejected ballots		23	0.6	N/A
Majority		482	12.0	N/A
Turnout		4,005	72.9	N/A
South African hold		Swing	N/A	
