= George Leuchars =

Colonel Sir George Leuchars, KCMG, DSO (died 1924) was a South African politician and military officer.

He was a minister in General Louis Botha's first cabinet from 1911 to 1912, when he resigned to protest against J. B. M. Hertzog's anti-imperial and anti-British sentiments.
