= Wage Act, 1925 =

The Wage Act, 1925 (Act No. 27 of 1925) was an act of the Parliament of South Africa which established a Wage Board which fixed minimum wages for workers not covered by industrial councils. It excluded farm labourers, domestic servants, and public servants. White workers were the main beneficiaries of this legislation because it prevented black workers from undercutting "civilised" levels of wages.
