= Frederic Creswell =

South African politician (1866–1948)

Frederic Hugh Page Creswell
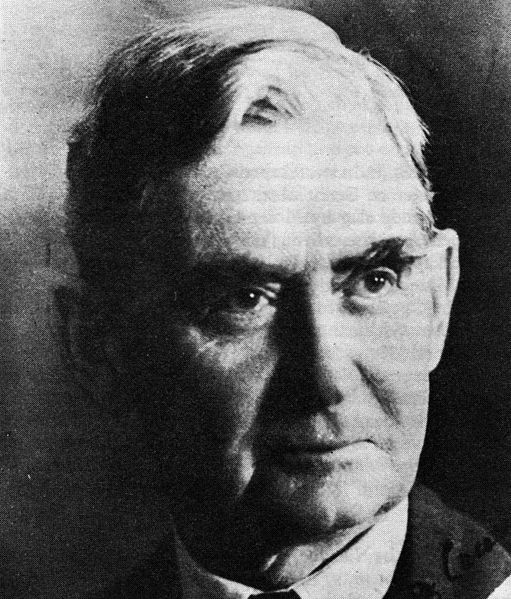

Minister of Defence
- In office 30 June 1924 – 29 March 1933
- Prime Minister: J. B. M. Hertzog
- Preceded by: Hendrik Mentz
- Succeeded by: Oswald Pirow

Leader of the South African Labour Party
- In office 1910–1928/1933
- Succeeded by: Walter Madeley

Personal details
- Born: 13 November 1866 Gibraltar
- Died: 25 August 1948 (aged 81) Kuilsrivier, South Africa
- Party: Labour (1910-1933)
- Other political affiliations: National (1933-1934)

Colonel Frederic Hugh Page Creswell DSO (13 November 1866 – 25 August 1948) was a Labour Party politician in South Africa. He was Minister of Defence from 30 June 1924 to 29 March 1933.

== Early life and family ==
The son of Edmund Creswell, Deputy Postmaster-General at Gibraltar and Surveyor of the Mediterranean, by his marriage to Mary M. W. Fraser, Creswell was born in Gibraltar and educated in England at Bruce Castle, Derby School, and the Royal School of Mines.

Creswell's brother Edmund (1849–1931) played for the Royal Engineers in the first FA Cup Final in 1872. Another brother, William (1852–1933), became a vice-admiral and is known as the "father" of the Royal Australian Navy.

== Career ==
Creswell worked as a mining engineer in Venezuela, the Ottoman Empire, Rhodesia and the Transvaal before becoming manager of the Durban Deep Mine, at Roodepoort. At the outset of the Second Boer War in 1899 he was commissioned as a lieutenant in the newly raised Imperial Light Horse. When mining on the Witwatersrand began again, he became General Manager of the Village Main Reef Mine. After strongly opposing Chinese labourers being imported to the Transvaal, he resigned as manager in 1903, going on to take a leading role in the campaign to end the use of Chinese labour and "became the champion of the white labourer", advocating the use of white labour, and white immigration, as the solution to South Africa's labour problems.

At the general election of 1910 he was elected to the House of Assembly of the Union Parliament, representing the new South African Labour Party, of which he was leader from 1910 to 1929. He remained an Assembly member until 1938.

He was arrested and imprisoned for a month for his role in supporting miners' strikes in 1913 and 1914. The Smuts government suppression of the strikes influenced Creswell and Labour to develop an alliance with J.B.M. Hertzog and the National Party with Labour joining a National Party-led coalition government as junior partner, resulting in Creswell entering the cabinet. As well as serving as the South African Minister of Defence from 1924 to March 1933, Creswell was simultaneously Minister of Labour from 1924 to 1925 and again from 1929 to 1933.

Despite their ideological differences, Creswell believed that he and Hertzog could find common ground, noting in a written correspondence to Hertzog dated the 12 April 1923 that

We found ourselves broadly in agreement in our view that the present Government acts as though dominated by the conviction that the interests of this country are best served by its taking what may be termed the “big financial” view of our serious internal and financial problems. Its policy is not only injuring the present welfare of the country but is seriously jeopardising our destiny as a civilised people.

In a memorandum by Creswell following the 1924 election, he expressed his belief that Labour could use its electoral strength to check conservatism in parliament, noting that

A further consideration arises from varying opinions in the Nationalist Party itself. In this, as in every party, there are some who are more conservative and some who lean to more advanced views. If Labour holds aloof the balance will swing to the conservative elements in the House more than if Labour did not hold aloof.

The alliance with the Nationalists eventually led to a split in the Labour Party when Hertzog dropped Labour MP Walter Madeley from the cabinet in 1928 due to his support for the multiracial Industrial and Commercial Workers' Union. Creswell and his supporters remained in government and became known as the "Creswell Labour" faction while Madeley and other Labour MPs joined the Opposition and became known as "National Council Labour" due to their being supported by the Labour Party's national council. In 1933, the Creswell Labour faction dissolved with its members joining the Hertzog's party.

Following the 1933 general election, Hertzog formed a coalition with Smuts and his South African Party, with the parties merging to form the United Party, resulting in Creswell being left out of cabinet. He remained a member of the House of Assembly until 1938 when he left politics.

In 1935 he was President of the Annual Conference of the International Labour Organization held at Geneva.

=== First World War service ===
During the South-West Africa campaign of 1914–1915, Creswell was second in command of the Rand Rifles. From 1916 to 1917 he commanded the 8th South African Infantry in the East African campaign, with the rank of lieutenant-colonel.

== Private life ==
In 1920, Creswell married Margaret, daughter of the Rev. H. Boys, formerly Rector of Layer Marney, Essex, England. They had no children. Creswell died on 25 August 1948 in Kuilsrivier. His ashes were interred in the Garden of Remembrance in Epping, near Cape Town.

A Fast Attack Craft of the South African Navy was named after him.

Political offices
Preceded by Hendrik Mentz	Minister of Defence (South Africa); 1924–1933	Succeeded by Oswald Pirow
