= 1920 South African general election =

- 10 March 1920

All 134 seats in the House of Assembly 68 seats needed for a majority
- Registered: 421,790
- Turnout: 66.94% (▼4.63pp)
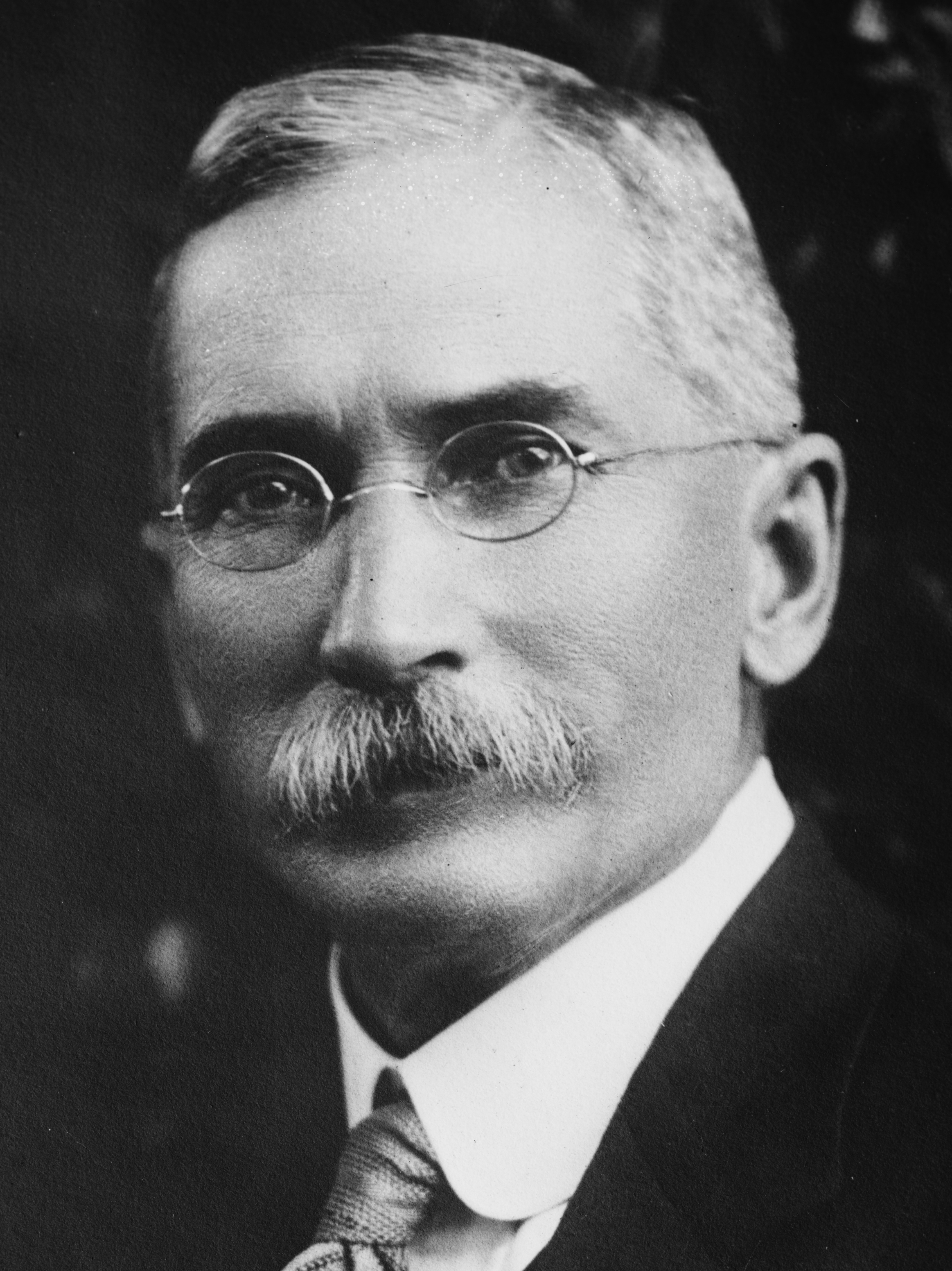

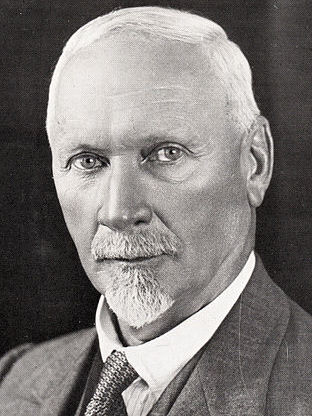

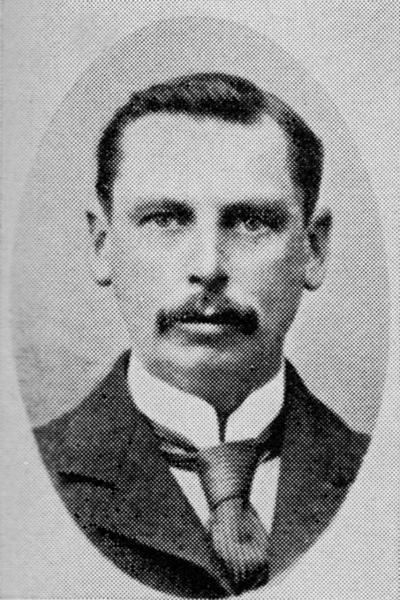

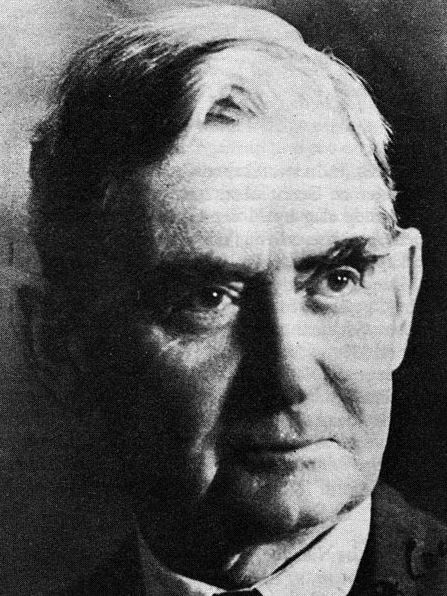
	First party	Second party
Leader	J. B. M. Hertzog	Jan Smuts
Party	National	South African
Leader's seat	Smithfield	Pretoria West
Last election	29.41%, 27 seats	36.67%, 54 seats
Seats won	43	41
Seat change	▲16	▼13
Popular vote	90,512	101,227
Percentage	32.62%	36.48%
Swing	▲3.21pp	▼0.19pp
	Third party	Fourth party
Leader	Thomas Smartt	Frederic Creswell
Party	Unionist	Labour
Leader's seat	Fort Beaufort	Troyeville
Last election	19.42%, 39 seats	9.63%, 4 seats
Seats won	25	21
Seat change	▼14	▲17
Popular vote	38,946	40,639
Percentage	14.03%	14.65%
Swing	▼5.39pp	▲5.01pp
- Results by province
Prime Minister before election
Jan Smuts
South African
Elected Prime Minister
Jan Smuts
South African

General elections were held in South Africa on 10 March 1920 to elect the 134 members of the House of Assembly. This was for the third Union Parliament.

The National Party (NP) won the largest number of seats, but not a majority. The South African Party (SAP) minority government continued in office, with Unionist Party support in Parliament. This was the third successive term of SAP government, but only the second period with General Jan Smuts as Prime Minister. The first SAP premier (General Louis Botha) had died in office in 1919, during the previous Parliament.

The National Party became the official opposition for the first time.

== Delimitation of electoral divisions ==
The South Africa Act 1909 had provided for a delimitation commission to define the boundaries for each electoral division. The representation by province, under the third delimitation report of 1919, is set out in the table below. The figures in brackets are the number of electoral divisions in the previous (1913) delimitation. If there is no figure in brackets then the number was unchanged.

Provinces	Cape	Natal	Orange Free State	Transvaal	Total
Divisions	51	17	17	49 (45)	134 (130)

== Results ==
The vote totals in the table below may not give a complete picture of the balance of political opinion, because of unopposed elections (where no votes were cast) and because contested seats may not have been fought by a candidate from all major parties.

Party	Votes	%	Seats	+/–
South African Party	101,227	36.48	41	–13
National Party	90,512	32.62	43	+16
Labour Party	40,639	14.65	21	+17
Unionist Party	38,946	14.03	25	–14
Socialist League	202	0.07	0	0
Independents	5,968	2.15	3	–3
Vacant			1	–
Total	277,494	100.00	134	+4
Valid votes	277,494	98.28		
Invalid/blank votes	4,867	1.72		
Total votes	282,361	100.00		
Registered voters/turnout	421,790	66.94		
Source: Potgieter
