= J. B. M. Hertzog =

South African politician (1866–1942)

General The Right Honourable J. B. M. Hertzog KC
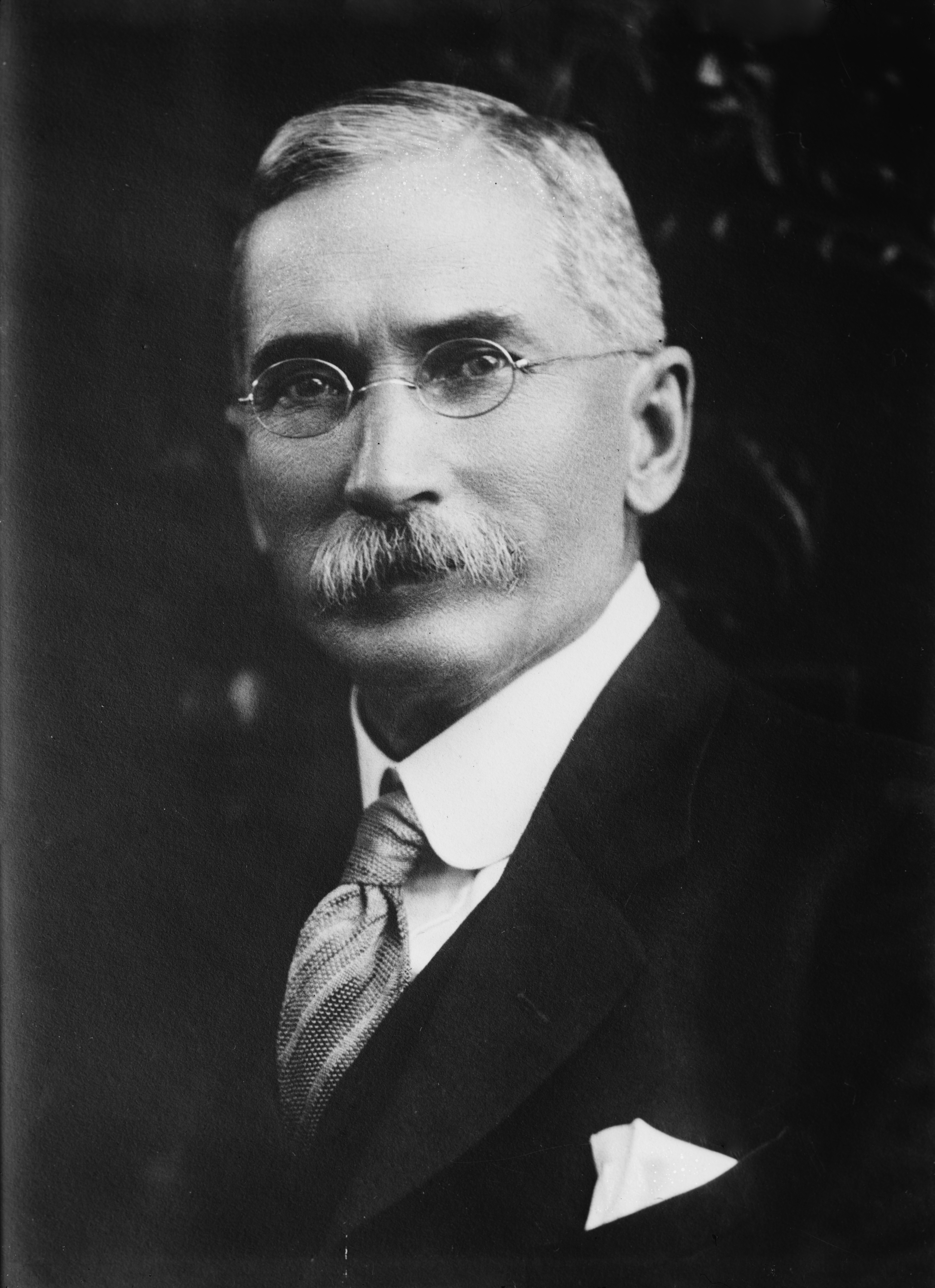
- Hertzog c. 1920

3rd Prime Minister of South Africa
- In office 30 June 1924 – 5 September 1939
- Monarchs: George V; Edward VIII; George VI
- Governors-General: The Earl of Athlone; The Earl of Clarendon; Sir Patrick Duncan
- Preceded by: Jan Smuts
- Succeeded by: Jan Smuts

President of the National Party
- In office 1 July 1914 – 1934
- Preceded by: Position established
- Succeeded by: Daniël Malan

Member of the House of Assembly for Smithfield
- In office 15 September 1910 – 5 September 1939
- Preceded by: Constituency established
- Succeeded by: Jim Fouché

Personal details
- Born: James Barry Munnik Hertzog; 3 April 1866 Soetendal, Wellington, Cape Colony
- Died: 21 November 1942 (aged 76) Pretoria, Transvaal, South Africa
- Party: National; United
- Spouse: Wilhelmina Neethling
- Education: Victoria College; University of Amsterdam
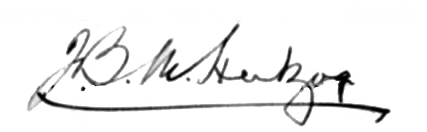
- Signature

General James Barry Munnik Hertzog KC (3 April 1866 – 21 November 1942), better known as Barry Hertzog or J. B. M. Hertzog, was a South African general and politician. He was a Boer commander during the Second Boer War who served as the third prime minister of the Union of South Africa from 1924 to 1939. Hertzog advocated for the development of Afrikaner culture and was determined to prevent Afrikaners from being excessively influenced by British culture. He founded the National Party in 1914.

In 1941, Hertzog, who had resigned after South Africa — against his efforts — entered World War II on the side of the Allies, issued a statement in which he openly praised Nazism and said it needed to be adapted to South African needs under a fascist dictatorship.

== Early life and career ==
Hertzog first studied law at Victoria College in Stellenbosch, Cape Colony. In 1889, he went to the Netherlands to read law at the University of Amsterdam, where he prepared a dissertation, on the strength of which he received his doctorate in law on 12 November 1892.

Hertzog had a law practice in Pretoria from 1892 until 1895, when he was appointed to the Orange Free State High Court. During the Boer War of 1899–1902, he rose to the rank of general, becoming the assistant chief commandant of the military forces (Commando units) of the Orange Free State. Despite some military reverses, he gained renown as a resourceful leader of the Boer commandos who chose to continue fighting, the so-called "bitter-enders". Eventually, convinced of the futility of further bloodshed, he signed the Treaty of Vereeniging in May 1902.

Constitutionally, Hertzog was a republican, believing strongly in promoting the independence of the Union of South Africa from the British Empire. His government approved the Statute of Westminster in 1931, and replaced Dutch as the second official language with Afrikaans in 1925, as well as instating a new national flag in 1928. His government approved women's suffrage for white women in 1930, thus strengthening the dominance of the white minority. Property and education requirements for whites were abandoned in the same year, with those for non-whites being severely tightened, and, in 1936, blacks were completely taken off the common voters' roll. Separately elected Native Representatives were instead instated, a policy repeated in the attempts of the later Apartheid regime to disenfranchise all non-whites during the 1950s. Through the system of gradual disenfranchisement spanning half a century, the South African electorate was not made up entirely of whites until the 1970 general election.

== Early political career ==
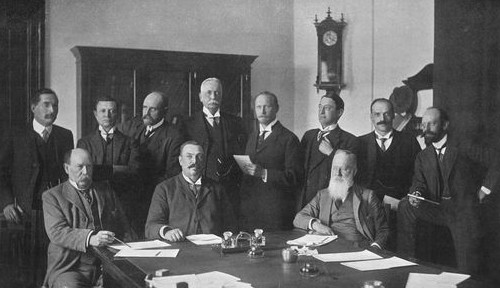
Botha government 1910

With South Africa then at peace, Hertzog entered politics as the chief organiser of the Orangia Unie Party. In 1907, the Orange River Colony gained self-government and Hertzog joined the cabinet as Attorney-General and Director of Education. His insistence that Dutch as well as English be taught in the schools aroused bitter opposition. He was appointed national Minister of Justice in the newly formed Union of South Africa, and continued in office until 1912. His marked antagonism to the British authorities and Premier Botha led to a ministerial crisis. In 1913, Hertzog led the secession of the Old Boer and anti-British section from the South African Party.

At the outbreak of the Maritz Rebellion in 1914, Hertzog adopted a neutral stance towards the conflict. In the years following the war, he headed the opposition to the government of General Smuts.

== Premiership ==
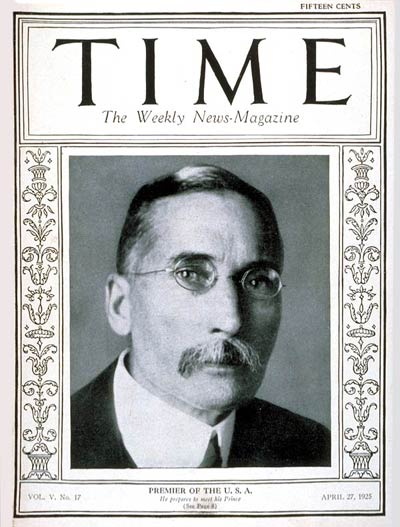
Time cover, 27 Apr 1925

=== First government (1924–1929) ===
In the general election of 1924, Hertzog's National Party defeated the South African Party of Jan Smuts and formed a coalition government with the South African Labour Party, which became known as the Pact Government. In 1934, the National Party and the South African Party merged to form the United Party, with Hertzog as Prime Minister and leader of the new party.

=== Second government (1929–1933) ===
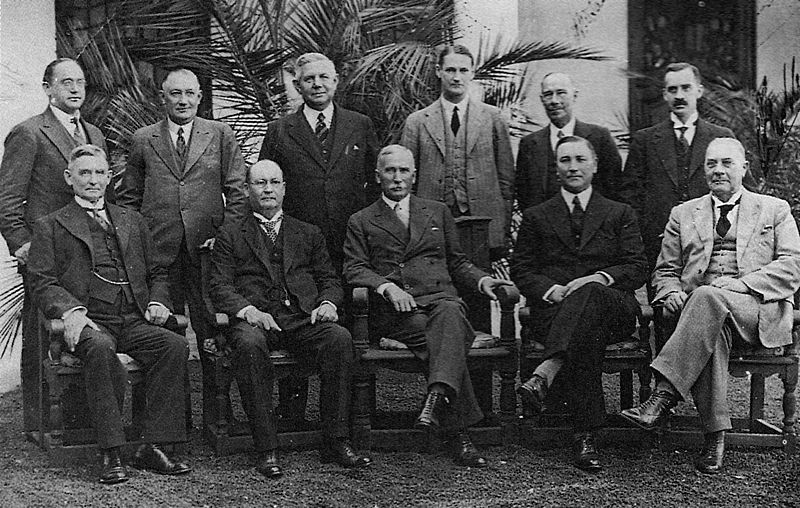
The second Hertzog cabinet in 1929.

Hertzog's second term as prime minister saw the establishment (in 1930) of the South African Iron and Steel Industrial Corp which helped to stimulate economic progress,

=== Third government (1933–1938) ===
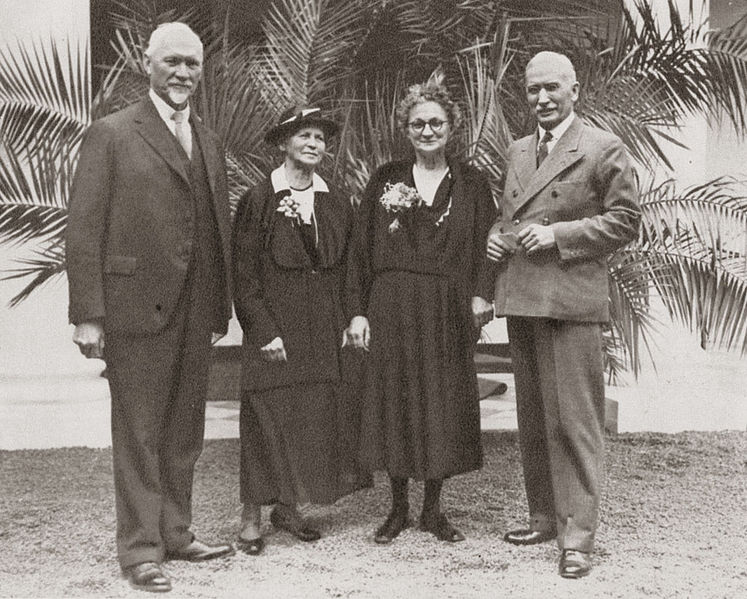
Smuts (furthest left) and Hertzog (furthest right) with their wives, circa 1934.

In foreign policy, Hertzog favoured a policy of distance from the British Empire and, as a lifelong Germanophile, was sympathetic towards revising the international system set up by the Treaty of Versailles in favour of lessening the burdens imposed on Germany. Hertzog's cabinet in the 1930s was divided between a pro-British group led by the Anglophile Smuts, and a pro-German group led by Oswald Pirow, the openly pro-Nazi and anti-Semitic minister of defence, with Hertzog occupying a middle position. Hertzog had an autocratic style of leadership, expecting the cabinet to approve his decisions rather than to discuss them and, as a consequence, the cabinet only met intermittently.

From 1934 onward, South Africa was dominated by an informal "inner cabinet" consisting of Hertzog, Smuts, Pirow, the Finance minister N.C. Havenga, and Native Affairs minister P. G. W. Grobler. Generally, the "inner cabinet" would meet in private and whatever decision they reached in their meetings would be presented to the cabinet to endorse with no discussion. Though Hertzog was not as pro-German as the faction led by Pirow, he tended to see Nazi Germany as a "normal state" and as a potential ally, unlike the Soviet Union, which Hertzog saw as a threat to the West.

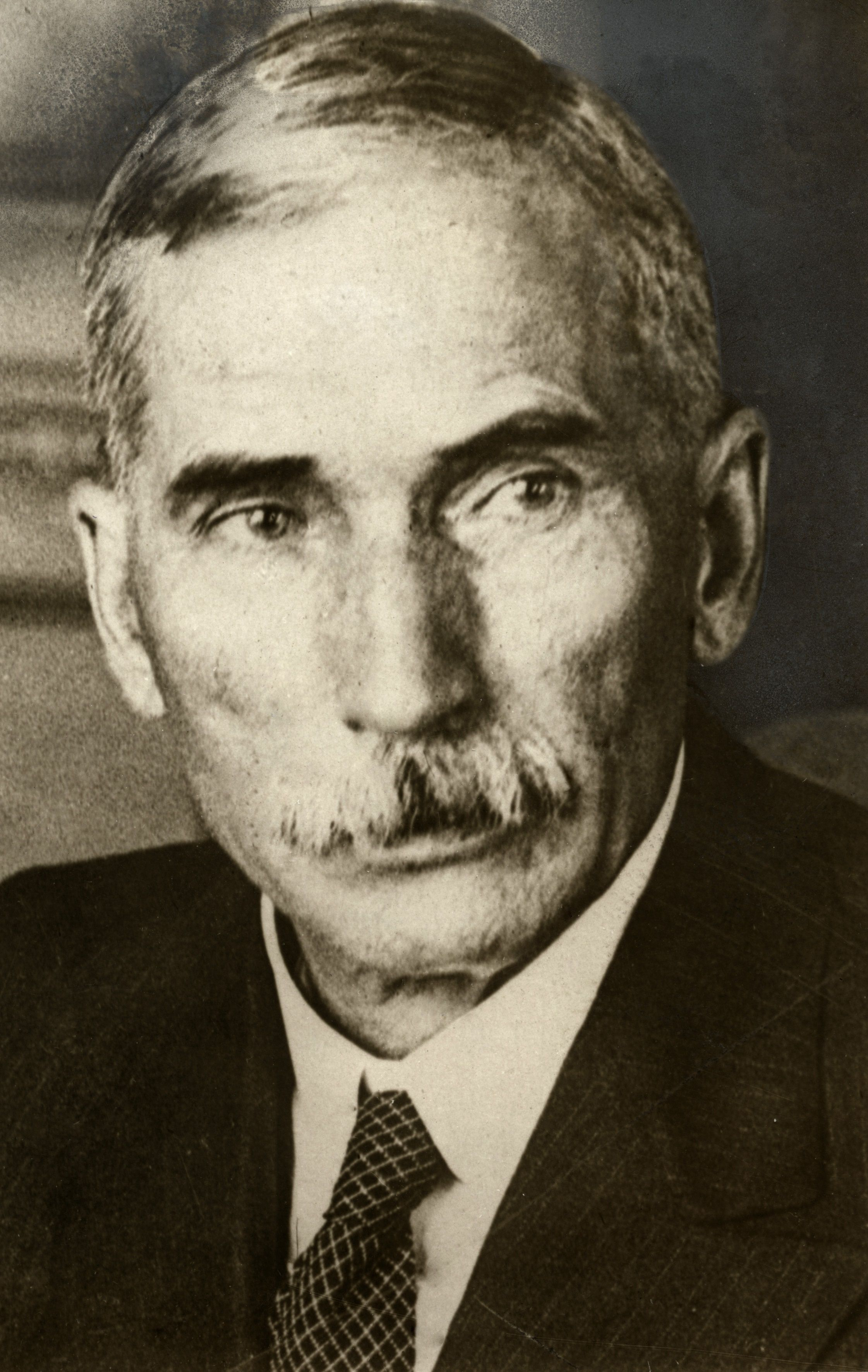
Hertzog in 1934

Alongside that, Hertzog saw France as the main threat to peace in Europe, viewing the Treaty of Versailles as an unjust and vindictive peace treaty, and he argued the French were the principal trouble-makers in Europe by seeking to uphold the Versailles Treaty. Hertzog argued that, if Adolf Hitler had a belligerent foreign policy, it was only because the Treaty of Versailles was intolerably harsh towards Germany, and, if the international system was revised to take account of Germany's "legitimate" complaints against Versailles, then Hitler would become a moderate and reasonable statesman. When Germany remilitarized the Rhineland in March 1936, Hertzog informed the British government that there was no possibility of South Africa taking part if Britain decided to go to war over the issue, and, in the ensuing crisis, South African diplomats took a very pro-German position, arguing that Germany was justified in violating the Treaty of Versailles by remilitarizing the Rhineland.

Hertzog's principal adviser on foreign affairs was his external affairs state secretary, H.D.J. Bodenstein, an anti-British Afrikaner nationalist and a republican, who was seen as the eminence grise of South African politics. No other man had the same degree of influence on Hertzog as Bodenstein. Sir William Henry Clark, the British High Commissioner to South Africa, had a long-standing feud with Bodenstein, whom he accused of being an Anglophobe, writing in his reports to London that Bodenstein always presented the British position in the worst possible light to Hertzog, and noting with anxiety that Bodenstein's best friend was Emile Wiehle, the German consul in Cape Town. The Germanophile South African minister in Berlin, Stefanus Gie, largely embraced Nazi values as his own, and, in reports to Pretoria, portrayed Germany as the victim of Jewish plots, arguing that the Nazis' discriminatory policies towards German Jews were only defensive measures. Though Hertzog did not share the anti-Semitism of Gie, the latter's dispatches portraying the Third Reich in a favourable light were used to support the prime minister's foreign policy preferences.

In a statement of foreign policy principles for South Africa drawn up by Pirow for the cabinet in March 1938, the first principle was combating Communism, and the second was having Germany serve as the "bulwark against Bolshevism". In a message to Charles te Water, the South African High Commissioner in London in early 1938, Hertzog told him to tell the British that South Africa expected "immediacy, impartiality and sincerity" in resolving the disputes of Europe. Just what was meant by that was explained by Hertzog in a letter to the British Prime Minister Neville Chamberlain in March 1938, which stated that South Africa would not fight in any "unjust" wars, and that, if Britain choose to go to war over the events in Czechoslovakia, then South Africa would remain neutral. On 22 March 1938, Hertzog sent Te Water a telegram stating that South Africa would not under any circumstances go to war with Germany in defence of Czechoslovakia, and stating that he regarded Eastern Europe as being rightfully in Germany's sphere of influence.

=== Fourth government (1938–1939) ===
In another letter in the spring of 1938, Hertzog noted that he was "exhausted" by France and wanted Chamberlain to tell the French that the Commonwealth, and South Africa in particular, would be neutral if France went to war with Germany over a German attack on Czechoslovakia. When te Water reported to Hertzog on 25 May 1938 that the British foreign secretary, Lord Halifax, had promised him that the British government was applying diplomatic pressure on Czechoslovakia to resolve the dispute over the Sudetenland in Germany's favour, and was pressuring France to abandon its alliance with Czechoslovakia, Hertzog stated his approval. On 14 September 1938, te Water complained to Lord Halifax about the "astonishing episode" of Britain drifting to war with Germany over the Sudetenland issue, stating that as far as South Africa was concerned, Germany was in the right in demanding that mostly German-speaking Sudetenland be allowed to join Germany, and Czechoslovakia and France was in the wrong, the first by refusing the German demands, and the second by having an alliance with Czechoslovakia that encouraged Prague to resist Berlin.

In the middle of September 1938, when Britain was on the verge of war with Germany over the Sudetenland issue, Hertzog clashed in the cabinet with Smuts over the course of action that South Africa would pursue. The former favoured neutrality and the latter was for intervention on Britain's side. On 15 September 1938, Hertzog presented the cabinet with a compromise plan that South Africa would declare neutrality in the event of war, but would be neutral in the most pro-British way possible. The cabinet was divided. Pirow favoured South Africa allying itself with Germany to fight against Britain. On the other hand, Smuts favoured South Africa allying with Britain and going to war with Germany, and threatened to use his influence with the MPs loyal to himself to bring down the government if Hertzog did declare neutrality.

On 19 September 1938, as a part of a peace plan to resolve the crisis, Britain offered to guarantee Czechoslovak territorial sovereignty if the latter agreed to allow the Sudetenland to join Germany, which led te Water to inform Lord Halifax that South Africa was utterly opposed to being part of the guarantee, and advised Britain against promising one, through he later changed his position, saying that South Africa would "guarantee" Czechoslovakia if it was backed by the League of Nations, and if Germany signed a non-aggression pact with Czechoslovakia.

On 23 September 1938, at the Bad Godesberg summit, Hitler rejected the Anglo-French plan for transferring the Sudetenland to Germany as insufficient, thus putting Europe on the brink of war. In a telegram to Chamberlain on 26 September 1938, Hertzog wrote that the differences between the Anglo-French and German positions were "mainly of method" and that, "as the issue was one of no material substance, but merely involves a matter of procedure for arriving at a result to which it is common cause between disputants Germany is entitled", there was no possibility of South Africa going to war over the issue. Even after Hitler's belligerent speech on Berlin on the same day, proclaiming that he would still attack Czechoslovakia unless Prague settled its disputes with Poland and Hungary by 1 October 1938, Hertzog, in a telegram to te Water, wrote that he felt "very deeply that if after this a European war was still to take place the responsibility for that will not be placed upon the shoulders of Germany".

In his messages to te Water in the last days of September 1938, Hertzog consistently portrayed Czechoslovakia and France as the trouble-makers, and argued that Britain must do more to apply pressure on those two states for more concessions to Germany. Te Water and the Canadian high commissioner in London, Vincent Massey, in a joint note on behalf of South Africa and Canada to Lord Halifax, stated that Sir Basil Newton, the British minister in Prague, should tell the Czechoslovak president Edvard Beneš, that "the obstructive tactics of the Czech government were unwelcome to the British and Dominion governments". On 28 September 1938, Hertzog was able to get the cabinet to approve his policy of pro-British neutrality subject to parliamentary approval, adding that South Africa would only go to war if Germany attacked Britain first. Given his views, Hertzog very much approved of the Munich Agreement of 30 September 1938, which he regarded as a "just" and "fair" resolution of the German-Czechoslovak dispute.

On 4 September 1939, the United Party caucus revolted against Hertzog's stance of neutrality in World War II, causing Hertzog's government to lose a vote on the issue in parliament by 80 to 67. Governor-General Sir Patrick Duncan refused Hertzog's request to dissolve parliament and call a general election on the question. Hertzog resigned and his coalition partner Smuts became prime minister. Smuts led the country into war, and political re-alignments followed: Hertzog and his faction joined with Daniel Malan's opposition Purified National Party to form the Herenigde Nasionale Party, with Hertzog becoming the new Leader of the Opposition. However, Hertzog soon lost the support of Malan and his supporters when they rejected Hertzog's platform of equal rights between British South Africans and Afrikaners, prompting Hertzog to resign and retire from politics.

Angered at being outmaneuvered, Hertzog issued a press statement in October 1941 in which he attacked "liberal capitalism" and the party system, while praising Nazism as in keeping with the traditions of the Afrikaners. He said Nazism was a system which simply had to be adapted to South African needs under a dictator.

=== Social and economic policies ===
As prime minister, Hertzog presided over the passage of a wide range of social and economic measures that did much to improve conditions for working-class whites. According to one historian, "the government of 1924, which combined Hertzog’s NP with the Labour Party, oversaw the foundations of an Afrikaner welfare state".

A Department of Labour was established, while the Wages Act (1925) laid down minimum wages for unskilled workers, although it excluded farm labourers, domestic servants, and public servants. It also established a Wage Board that regulated pay for certain kinds of work, regardless of racial background (although whites were the main beneficiaries of the legislation). The Old Age Pensions Act (1927) provided retirement benefits for white workers. Coloureds also received the pension, but the maximum for Coloureds was only 70% that of whites.

A withdrawal of duties on imported raw materials for industrial use was carried out which encouraged industrial development and created further employment opportunities, but that led to a higher cost of living. Various forms of assistance to agriculture were also introduced. Dairy farmers, for instance, were aided by a levy imposed on all butter sales, while an increase in import taxes protected farmers from international competition. Farmers also benefited from preferential railway tariffs and from the widening availability of loans from the Land Bank. The government also assisted farmers by guaranteeing prices for farm produce, while work colonies were established for those in need of social salvage. Secondary industries were established to improve employment opportunities, which did much to reduce white poverty and enabled many whites to join the ranks of both the semi-skilled and skilled labour force.

An extension of worker's compensation was carried out, with improvements including new medical aid provisions, while improvements were made in the standards specified under a contemporary Factory Act, thus bringing the Act into line with international standards, in regard to the length of the working week and the employment of child labour. The law on miners' phthisis (pulmonary tuberculosis) was overhauled, and increased protection of white urban tenants against eviction was introduced at a time when housing was in short supply. The civil service was opened up to Afrikaners through the promotion of bilingualism, while a widening of the suffrage was effected, with the enfranchisement of white women. The pact also instituted "penny postage", automatic telephone exchanges, a cash-on-delivery postal service, and an experimental airmail service which was later made permanent.

The Department of Social Welfare was established in 1937 as a separate government department to deal with social conditions. There was increased expenditure on education for both whites and Coloureds. Spending on Coloured education rose by 60%, which led to the number of Coloured children in school growing by 30%. Grants for the blind and the disabled were introduced in 1936 and 1937 respectively, while unemployment benefits were introduced in 1937. That same year, the coverage of maintenance grants was extended.

Although the social and economic policies pursued by Hertzog and his ministers did much to improve social and economic conditions for whites, they did not benefit the majority of South Africans, who found themselves the targets of discriminatory labour laws that entrenched white supremacy in South Africa. A Civilised Labour Policy was pursued by the Pact Government, which involved replacing black workers with whites (typically impoverished Afrikaners), and which was enforced through three key pieces of legislation: the Industrial Conciliation Act No 11 of 1924, the Minimum Wages Act No. 27 of 1925, and the Mines and Works Amendment Act no. 25 of 1926.

The Industrial Conciliation Act (No 11 of 1924) created job reservation for whites while excluding blacks from membership of registered trade unions, which therefore prohibited the registration of black trade unions. The Minimum Wages Act (No. 27 of 1925) bestowed upon the Minister for Labour the power to force employers to give preference to whites when hiring workers, while the Mines and Works Amendment Act (No. 25 of 1926) reinforced a colour bar in the mining industry, while excluding Indian miners from skilled jobs. In a sense, therefore, the discriminatory social and economic policies pursued by the Pact Government helped pave the way for the eventual establishment of the Apartheid state.

== Death and legacy ==
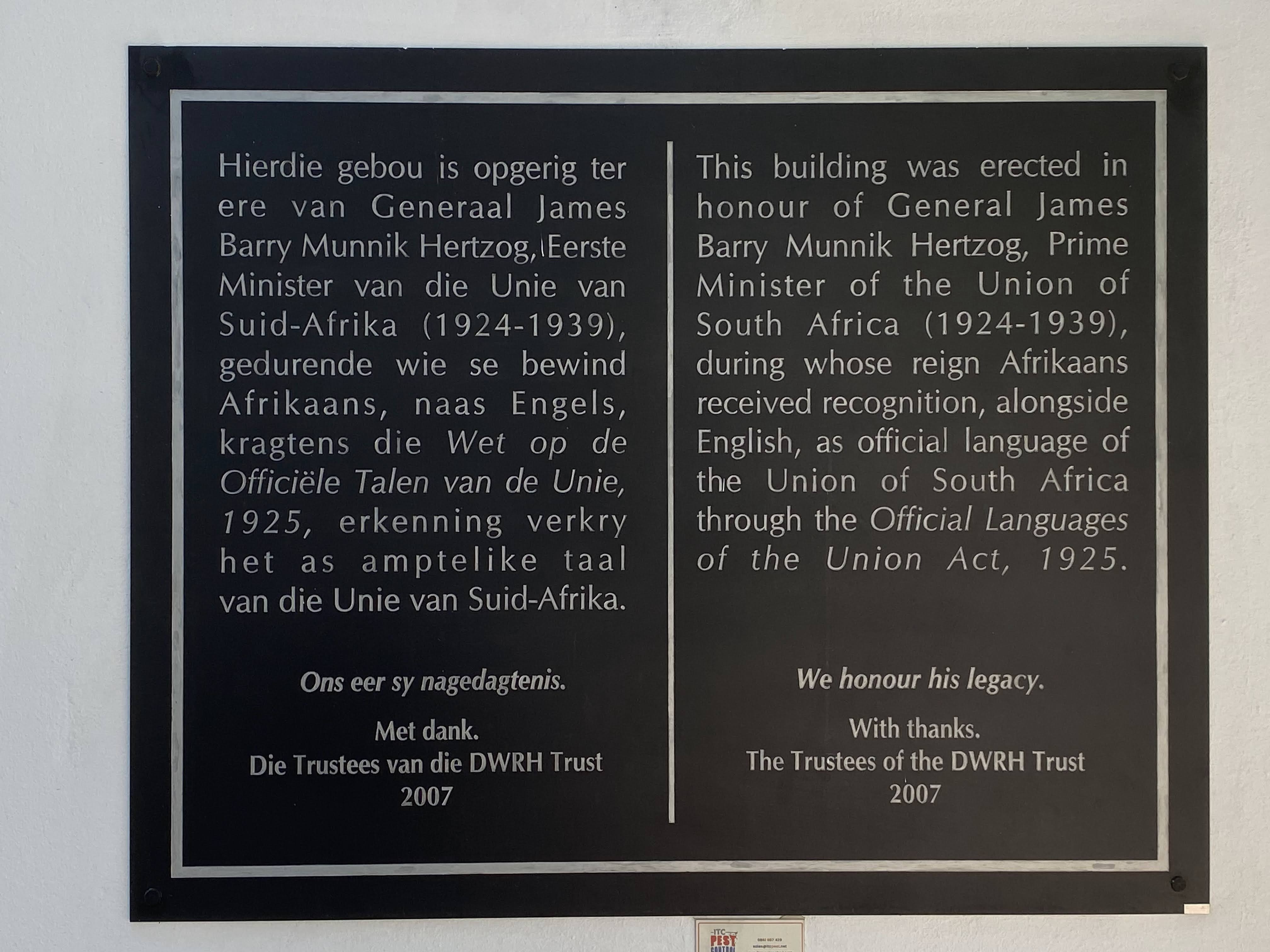
Plaque on James Barry Munnik House, Paarl, erected in honour of General JBM Hertzog

Hertzog died on 21 November 1942, at the age of 76.

A 4-metre-high statue of Hertzog was erected in 1977 at the front lawns of the Union Building. The statue was taken down on 22 November 2013 and moved to a new location in the gardens. It was still in good condition, save for the removal of the spectacles that were originally included on the statue. The statue was removed to make way for a 9-metre-high statue of Nelson Mandela.

Supporters of Hertzog invented the Hertzoggie, a jam-filled tartlet with a coconut meringue topping, that is still a popular confection in South Africa.

He is the only South African Prime Minister to have served under three monarchs: George V, Edward VIII, and George VI, due to serving the year of 1936.

Political offices
New title	Minister of Justice of South Africa; 1910–1912	Succeeded by Jacobus Wilhelmus Sauer
Preceded by Jan Smuts	Prime Minister of South Africa; 1924–1939	Succeeded by Jan Smuts
Party political offices
New title	Leader of the United Party; 1934–1939	Succeeded by Jan Smuts
