= Bloemfontein South (House of Assembly of South Africa constituency) =

- Bloemfontein-Suid
- Former constituency for the South African House of Assembly
- Province: Orange Free State
- Electorate: 8,421 (1933)

Former constituency
- Created: 1920
- Abolished: 1938
- Number of members: 1
- Last MHA: J. J. Haywood (GNP)
- Created from: Bloemfontein; Bloemfontein District
- Replaced by: Bloemfontein; Bloemfontein District

Bloemfontein South (Afrikaans: Bloemfontein-Suid) was a constituency in the Orange Free State Province of South Africa, which existed from 1920 to 1938. It covered the southern parts of Bloemfontein, the provincial capital and the judicial capital of South Africa. Throughout its existence it elected one member to the House of Assembly.

== Franchise notes ==
When the Union of South Africa was formed in 1910, the electoral qualifications in use in each pre-existing colony were kept in place. In the Orange River Colony, and its predecessor the Orange Free State, the vote was restricted to white men, and as such, elections in the Orange Free State Province were held on a whites-only franchise from the beginning. The franchise was also restricted by property and education qualifications until the 1933 general election, following the passage of the Women's Enfranchisement Act, 1930 and the Franchise Laws Amendment Act, 1931. From then on, the franchise was given to all white citizens aged 21 or over. Non-whites remained disenfranchised until the end of apartheid and the introduction of universal suffrage in 1994.

== History ==
While slightly more liberal than the rest of the Free State, Bloemfontein was still the most conservative of South Africa's major cities. It was first split into North and South constituencies in 1920, after a decade as a single seat, and after a brief period represented by Deneys Reitz of the South African Party, Bloemfontein South would only elect National Party MPs for the remainder of its existence. In 1921, Colin Fraser Steyn successfully stood for election both in Bloemfontein South and the rural seat of Vredefort, and chose to represent Bloemfontein South so as to avoid a by-election in the marginal seat. He was re-elected by a far bigger margin in 1924, and stood down in 1929. His replacement, Jan Jacobus Haywood, continued to hold the seat comfortably, even in 1933 when Steyn ran against him as a candidate for Tielman Roos' new party. Shortly after the 1933 election, Nationalist Prime Minister J. B. M. Hertzog announced a merger with Jan Smuts' SAP to form the new United Party, a move that was deeply controversial among his conservative Afrikaner base. Haywood was one of the nineteen MPs who "refounded" the Purified National Party under the leadership of D. F. Malan, and when the City-District division returned in 1938, he was elected for the District seat under that label.

== Members ==
Election	Member	Party
1920	Deneys Reitz	South African
1921	Colin Fraser Steyn	National
1924	Colin Fraser Steyn	National
1929	J. J. Haywood	National
1933	J. J. Haywood	National
1934	J. J. Haywood	GNP
1938	constituency abolished	

== Detailed results ==
=== Elections in the 1920s ===
General election 1920: Bloemfontein South
Party	Candidate	Votes	%	±%
South African	Deneys Reitz	967	52.8	New
National	Colin Fraser Steyn	866	47.2	New
Majority		101	5.6	N/A
Turnout		1,833	59.7	N/A
South African win (new seat)				

General election 1921: Bloemfontein South
Party	Candidate	Votes	%	±%
National	Colin Fraser Steyn	1,189	51.0	+3.8
South African	Deneys Reitz	1,142	49.0	−3.8
Majority		47	2.0	N/A
Turnout		2,331	70.1	+10.4
National gain from		Swing	+3.8	

General election 1924: Bloemfontein South
Party	Candidate	Votes	%	±%
National	Colin Fraser Steyn	1,300	63.6	+12.6
South African	H. N. W. Botha	738	36.1	−12.9
Rejected ballots		6	0.3	N/A
Majority		562	27.5	+25.5
Turnout		2,044	80.9	+10.8
National gain from		Swing	+12.8	

General election 1929: Bloemfontein South
Party	Candidate	Votes	%	±%
National	J. J. Haywood	1,786	67.1	+3.5
South African	P. J. van B. Faure	755	28.4	−7.7
Labour (N.C.)	H. W. Berger	103	3.9	New
Rejected ballots		16	0.6	+0.3
Majority		1,031	38.7	+11.2
Turnout		2,660	81.6	+0.7
National hold		Swing	+5.6	

=== Elections in the 1930s ===
General election 1933: Bloemfontein South
Party	Candidate	Votes	%	±%
National	J. J. Haywood	3,491	62.1	−5.0
Roos	Colin Fraser Steyn	2,073	36.9	New
Rejected ballots		62	1.0	+0.4
Majority		1,418	38.7	N/A
Turnout		5,626	66.8	−14.8
National hold		Swing	N/A	
