= Bloemfontein North (House of Assembly of South Africa constituency) =

- Former constituency for the South African House of Assembly
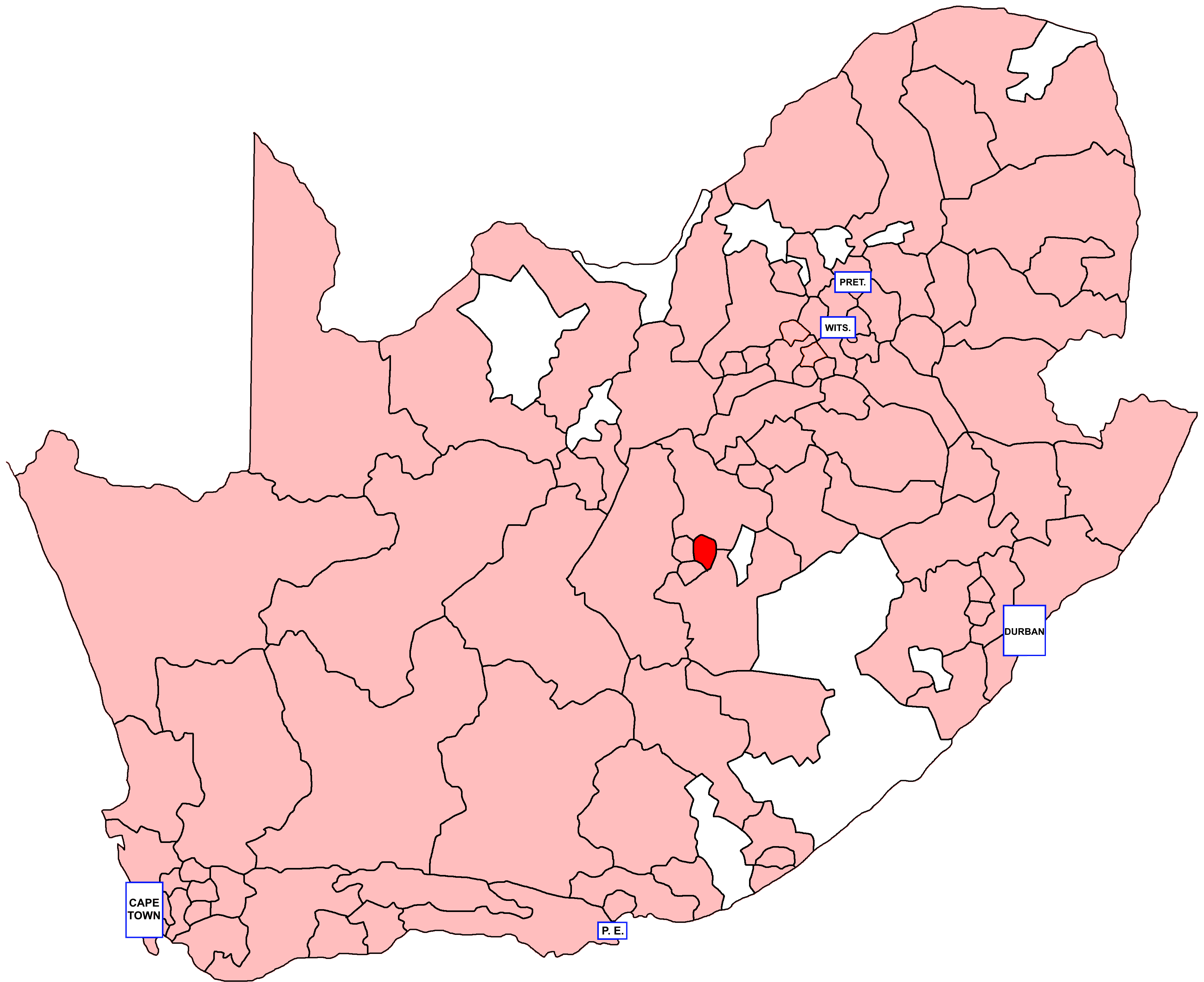
- Location of Bloemfontein North within South Africa (1981)
- Province: Orange Free State
- Electorate: 16,764 (1989)

Former constituency
- Created: 1920; 1974
- Abolished: 1938; 1994
- Number of members: 1
- Last MHA: Frik van Heerden (NP)
- Created from: Bloemfontein District (1974)
- Replaced by: Free State (1994)

Bloemfontein North (Afrikaans: Bloemfontein-Noord) was a constituency in the Orange Free State Province of South Africa, which existed from 1920 to 1938 and from 1974 to 1994. It covered the northern parts of Bloemfontein, the provincial capital and the judicial capital of South Africa. Throughout its existence it elected one member to the House of Assembly.

== Franchise notes ==
When the Union of South Africa was formed in 1910, the electoral qualifications in use in each pre-existing colony were kept in place. In the Orange River Colony, and its predecessor the Orange Free State, the vote was restricted to white men, and as such, elections in the Orange Free State Province were held on a whites-only franchise from the beginning. The franchise was also restricted by property and education qualifications until the 1933 general election, following the passage of the Women's Enfranchisement Act, 1930 and the Franchise Laws Amendment Act, 1931. From then on, the franchise was given to all white citizens aged 21 or over. Non-whites remained disenfranchised until the end of apartheid and the introduction of universal suffrage in 1994.

== History ==
While slightly more liberal than the rest of the Free State, Bloemfontein was still the most conservative of South Africa's major cities. It was first split into North and South constituencies in 1920, after a decade as a single seat, and after a brief period with a National Party MP, Bloemfontein North became the only Free State constituency ever to be represented by a Labour Party member. Arthur Barlow held Bloemfontein North until 1929, and in the Labour Party split of that year, he joined Walter Madeley's faction which advocated against continuing in government alongside the NP. The pro-government Creswell faction nominated Fred Shaw as a replacement candidate, and he was duly elected with Nationalist support. 1933 saw a rematch of sorts, with Shaw standing for re-election and Barlow being nominated as a candidate for Tielman Roos' new party - although he did better than most "Roosite" candidates, it wasn't enough to defeat Shaw in a straight contest. When Bloemfontein was rearranged into City and District seats for the 1938 election, Shaw stood as an independent for the City seat and lost badly.

Bloemfontein North was recreated in 1974, when the District seat was abolished and Bloemfontein was rearranged into three compass-point seats. The new seat, like the rest of the city, was safe for the governing National Party. Its last MP, Frik van Heerden, went on to serve a term in the non-racial National Assembly, retiring from politics in 1999.

== Members ==
Election	Member	Party
1920	J. W. G. Steyn	National
1921	Arthur Barlow	Labour
1924	Arthur Barlow	Labour
1929	Fred Shaw	Labour
1933	Fred Shaw	Labour
1938	constituency abolished	

Election	Member	Party
1974	G. P. de la R. Terblanche	National
1977	G. P. de la R. Terblanche	National
1981	G. P. de la R. Terblanche	National
1987	Frik van Heerden	National
1989	Frik van Heerden	National
1994	constituency abolished	

== Detailed results ==
=== Elections in the 1920s ===
General election 1920: Bloemfontein North
Party	Candidate	Votes	%	±%
National	J. W. G. Steyn	894	43.1	New
Labour	Arthur Barlow	598	28.8	New
Unionist	H. F. Blaine	584	28.1	New
Majority		296	14.3	N/A
Turnout		2,076	66.5	N/A
National win (new seat)				

General election 1921: Bloemfontein North
Party	Candidate	Votes	%	±%
Labour	Arthur Barlow	1,246	57.3	+28.5
National	J. W. G. Steyn	930	42.7	−0.4
Majority		316	14.6	N/A
Turnout		2,176	66.4	−0.1
Labour gain from National		Swing	+14.1	

General election 1924: Bloemfontein North
Party	Candidate	Votes	%	±%
Labour	Arthur Barlow	1,436	58.8	+1.5
South African	B. Kasselman	997	40.8	New
Rejected ballots		10	0.4	N/A
Majority		439	18.0	N/A
Turnout		2,443	76.1	+9.7
Labour hold		Swing	N/A	

General election 1929: Bloemfontein North
Party	Candidate	Votes	%	±%
Labour (Creswell)	Fred Shaw	1,380	52.1	New
South African	C. J. H. Reitz	894	33.8	−7.0
Labour (N.C.)	Arthur Barlow	1,436	12.8	−46.0
Rejected ballots		33	1.3	+0.9
Majority		486	18.3	N/A
Turnout		2,647	83.2	+7.1
Labour gain from Labour		Swing	N/A	

=== Elections in the 1930s ===
General election 1933: Bloemfontein North
Party	Candidate	Votes	%	±%
Labour (Creswell)	Fred Shaw	2,834	51.4	-0.7
Roos	Arthur Barlow	2,594	46.7	+33.9
Rejected ballots		102	2.9	+1.6
Majority		260	4.7	N/A
Turnout		5,550	67.7	−15.5
Labour hold		Swing	-17.3	
