= Orange Free State Provincial Council =

The Orange Free State Provincial Council was the provincial council of the Orange Free State Province in South Africa. It was created by the South Africa Act 1909, with effect from the formation of the Union of South Africa on 31 May 1910.

The provincial council continued to exist until 1986, when its functions were transferred to a strengthened executive authority appointed by the State President. The province itself was disbanded in 1994, when the provinces were reconstructed.

== Election system and terms ==
The provincial council was composed of members elected, by the first past the post electoral system, Originally provinces with fewer than 25 single member electoral divisions, used for the House of Assembly elections (like the Orange Free State), were divided into 25 provincial seats. However under the Constitution and Elections Amendment Act 1973, provinces with less than 20 House of Assembly seats (like Orange Free State at the time) were divided into twice as many electoral divisions for the provincial than the national elections. The effect of the change was to increase the size of the provincial council from 25 members to 28.

Originally the term of the provincial council was five years, from the first meeting of the council after it was elected. The administrator of the province fixed the date for the meeting, but the provincial council had to meet at least once a year. The South African Parliament could alter the term by legislation (as it did when the provincial elections due in 1941 were postponed until 1943), but there was no general power to dissolve a provincial council before its statutory term expired.

Under the Constitution and Elections Amendment Act 1973, the State President was given the power to dissolve the provincial councils at the same time as the House of Assembly, so that the subsequent provincial election could take place on the same day as a parliamentary general election.

== Executive committee ==
Executive powers were shared by the administrator and an executive committee. This arrangement was neither the traditional 'Westminster' model (such as that which existed at the Union level of government) or a United States style separation of powers between the executive and legislative parts of the government.

The administrator of the province was described, in section 68 (1) of the South Africa Act 1909, as "a chief executive officer … in whose name all executive acts relating to provincial affairs therein shall be done".

The administrator was appointed, by the national government, for a five-year term and could not be removed except by the Governor General for "cause assigned". The administrator was not responsible to the provincial council and it had no power to remove him from office. The administrator was the chairman of the provincial executive committee and had both an original and casting vote in its deliberations.

The provincial council elected four persons (usually members of the provincial council), who together with the administrator formed the provincial executive committee. The four members were elected by single transferable vote, so were not necessarily all from the same party.

It was provided, by Section 80 of the South Africa Act 1909, that "the executive committee shall on behalf of the provincial council carry on the administration of provincial affairs'’.

== Election results, by party 1935-1981 ==
| Election | National Party | United Party | Total |
|---|---|---|---|
| 1935 | 6 | 19 | 25 |
| 1943 | 21 | 4 | 25 |
| 1949 | 24 | 1 | 25 |
| 1954 | 25 | - | 25 |
| 1959 | 25 | - | 25 |
| 1965 | 25 | - | 25 |
| 1970 | 25 | - | 25 |
| 1974 | 28 | - | 28 |
| 1977 | 28 | - | 28 |
| 1981 | 28 | - | 28 |

Note: National Party, in the above table, includes the Purified National Party (1935) and the Reunited National Party (1943–1949).
