= Oudtshoorn (House of Assembly of South Africa constituency) =

South African constituency, 1910–1994

- Former constituency for the South African House of Assembly
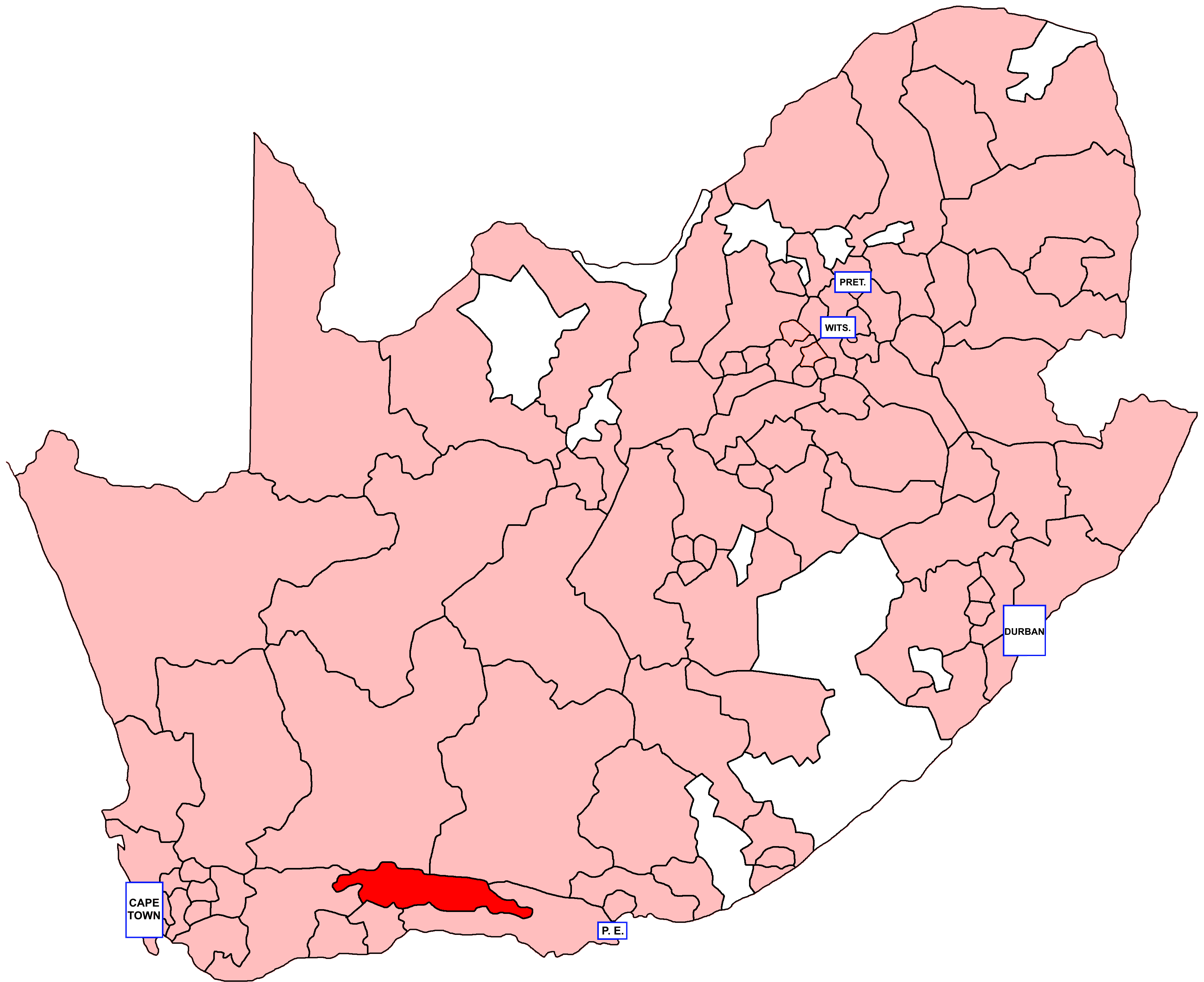
- Location of Oudtshoorn within South Africa (1981)
- Province: Cape of Good Hope
- Electorate: 12,943 (1989)

Former constituency
- Created: 1910
- Abolished: 1994
- Number of members: 1
- Last MHA: A. J. de Jager (NP)
- Replaced by: Western Cape

Oudtshoorn was a constituency in the Cape Province of South Africa, which existed from 1910 to 1994. The constituency covered a rural area along the Swartberg mountain range, centred on the town of Oudtshoorn. Throughout its existence it elected one member to the House of Assembly and one to the Cape Provincial Council.

== Franchise notes ==
When the Union of South Africa was formed in 1910, the electoral qualifications in use in each pre-existing colony were kept in place. The Cape Colony had implemented a “colour-blind” franchise known as the Cape Qualified Franchise, which included all adult literate men owning more than £75 worth of property (controversially raised from £25 in 1892), and this initially remained in effect after the colony became the Cape Province. As of 1908, 22,784 out of 152,221 electors in the Cape Colony were “Native or Coloured”. Eligibility to serve in Parliament and the Provincial Council, however, was restricted to whites from 1910 onward.

The first challenge to the Cape Qualified Franchise came with the Women's Enfranchisement Act, 1930 and the Franchise Laws Amendment Act, 1931, which extended the vote to women and removed property qualifications for the white population only – non-white voters remained subject to the earlier restrictions. In 1936, the Representation of Natives Act removed all black voters from the common electoral roll and introduced three “Native Representative Members”, white MPs elected by the black voters of the province and meant to represent their interests in particular. A similar provision was made for Coloured voters with the Separate Representation of Voters Act, 1951, and although this law was challenged by the courts, it went into effect in time for the 1958 general election, which was thus held with all-white voter rolls for the first time in South African history. The all-white franchise would continue until the end of apartheid and the introduction of universal suffrage in 1994.

== History ==
Like many rural constituencies across the Cape, Oudtshoorn was a conservative seat with a largely Afrikaans-speaking electorate. Its most notable and longest-serving MP, Stephanus Petrus le Roux, was first elected in a 1923 by-election and represented the seat until 1958, being one of the 19 Nationalist MPs who joined D. F. Malan’s Purified National Party in 1934, and serving as Minister for Agriculture in Malan and J. G. Strijdom’s cabinets. His successor, Pieter Mattheus Kruger Le Roux, also served as a cabinet minister for much of his time representing Oudtshoorn. By this time, the seat was rarely even contested by the opposition – in fact, the only contest in the seat between 1958 and 1981 was the 1972 by-election following P. K. Le Roux’ retirement. In the 1980s, the Conservative Party made some inroads, but Oudtshoorn remained an NP seat until the end of apartheid.

== Members ==
Election	Member	Party
1910	Johannes Hendrik Schoeman	South African
1915	Johannes Hendrik Schoeman	South African
1920	Cornelis Jacobus Langenhoven	National
1921	J. A. Raubenheimer	South African
1923 by	Stephanus Petrus le Roux	National
1924	Stephanus Petrus le Roux	National
1929	Stephanus Petrus le Roux	National
1933	Stephanus Petrus le Roux	National
1934	Stephanus Petrus le Roux	GNP
1938	Stephanus Petrus le Roux	GNP
1943	Stephanus Petrus le Roux	HNP
1948	Stephanus Petrus le Roux	HNP
1953	Stephanus Petrus le Roux	National
1958	Pieter Mattheus Kruger Le Roux	National
1961	Pieter Mattheus Kruger Le Roux	National
1966	Pieter Mattheus Kruger Le Roux	National
1970	Pieter Mattheus Kruger Le Roux	National
1972 by	P. J. Badenhorst	National
1974	P. J. Badenhorst	National
1977	P. J. Badenhorst	National
1981	P. J. Badenhorst	National
1987	P. J. Badenhorst	National
1989	A. J. de Jager	National
1994	constituency abolished	

== Detailed results ==
=== Elections in the 1910s ===
General election 1910: Oudtshoorn
Party	Candidate	Votes	%	±%
South African	J. H. Schoeman	1,209	64.4	New
Independent	E. Edmeades	668	35.6	New
Majority		541	28.8	N/A
South African win (new seat)				

General election 1915: Oudtshoorn
Party	Candidate	Votes	%	±%
South African	J. H. Schoeman	1,350	55.0	−8.6
National	C. J. Langenhoven	1,069	43.5	New
Labour	A. F. Symons	36	1.5	New
Majority		281	11.5	N/A
Turnout		2,455	75.9	N/A
South African hold		Swing	N/A	

=== Elections in the 1920s ===
General election 1920: Oudtshoorn
Party	Candidate	Votes	%	±%
National	C. J. Langenhoven	1,545	53.9	+10.4
South African	A. H. Mulder	1,320	46.1	−8.9
Majority		225	5.8	N/A
Turnout		2,865	78.0	+2.1
National gain from South African		Swing	+9.7	

General election 1921: Oudtshoorn
Party	Candidate	Votes	%	±%
South African	Jan Abraham Raubenheimer	1,668	51.8	+5.7
National	Cornelis Jacobus Langenhoven	1,553	48.2	−5.7
Majority		115	3.6	N/A
Turnout		3,221	77.4	−0.6
South African gain from National		Swing	+5.7	

General election 1924: Oudtshoorn
Party	Candidate	Votes	%	±%
National	S. P. le Roux	2,024	59.5	+11.3
South African	S. G. Schoeman	1,351	39.7	−12.1
Rejected ballots		28	0.8	N/A
Majority		673	19.8	N/A
Turnout		3,403	85.4	+8.0
National gain from South African		Swing	+11.7	

General election 1929: Oudtshoorn
Party	Candidate	Votes	%	±%
National	S. P. le Roux	1,805	60.3	+0.8
South African	P. A. H. Melville	1,150	38.4	−1.3
Rejected ballots		40	1.3	+0.5
Majority		655	21.9	+2.1
Turnout		2,995	85.9	+0.5
National hold		Swing	+1.1	

=== Elections in the 1930s ===
General election 1933: Oudtshoorn
Party	Candidate	Votes	%	±%
National	S. P. le Roux	3,608	57.6	−2.7
Independent	J. E. Potgieter	2,561	40.9	New
Rejected ballots		96	1.5	+0.2
Majority		1,047	16.7	N/A
Turnout		6,265	85.6	−0.3
National hold		Swing	N/A	

General election 1938: Oudtshoorn
Party	Candidate	Votes	%	±%
Purified National	Stephanus Petrus le Roux	3,997	57.5	−0.1
United	A. B. Beyers	2,891	41.6	New
Labour	B. van der Westhuizen	21	0.3	New
Rejected ballots		39	0.6	-0.9
Majority		1,106	15.9	N/A
Turnout		6,948	91.8	+6.2
Purified National hold		Swing	N/A	
