= Victoria West (House of Assembly of South Africa constituency) =

South African constituency, 1910–1953

- Victoria-Wes
- Former constituency for the South African House of Assembly
- Province: Cape of Good Hope
- Electorate: 9,404 (1948)

Former constituency
- Created: 1910
- Abolished: 1953
- Number of members: 1
- Last MHA: P. K. Le Roux (NP)
- Replaced by: Prieska

Victoria West (Afrikaans: Victoria-Wes) was a constituency in the Cape Province of South Africa, which existed from 1910 to 1953. The constituency covered a large rural area in the Karoo, centred on the town of Victoria West. Throughout its existence it elected one member to the House of Assembly and one to the Cape Provincial Council.

== Franchise notes ==
When the Union of South Africa was formed in 1910, the electoral qualifications in use in each pre-existing colony were kept in place. The Cape Colony had implemented a “colour-blind” franchise known as the Cape Qualified Franchise, which included all adult literate men owning more than £75 worth of property (controversially raised from £25 in 1892), and this initially remained in effect after the colony became the Cape Province. As of 1908, 22,784 out of 152,221 electors in the Cape Colony were “Native or Coloured”. Eligibility to serve in Parliament and the Provincial Council, however, was restricted to whites from 1910 onward.

The first challenge to the Cape Qualified Franchise came with the Women's Enfranchisement Act, 1930 and the Franchise Laws Amendment Act, 1931, which extended the vote to women and removed property qualifications for the white population only – non-white voters remained subject to the earlier restrictions. In 1936, the Representation of Natives Act removed all black voters from the common electoral roll and introduced three “Native Representative Members”, white MPs elected by the black voters of the province and meant to represent their interests in particular. A similar provision was made for Coloured voters with the Separate Representation of Voters Act, 1951, and although this law was challenged by the courts, it went into effect in time for the 1958 general election, which was thus held with all-white voter rolls for the first time in South African history. The all-white franchise would continue until the end of apartheid and the introduction of universal suffrage in 1994.

== History ==
Like many constituencies in the rural Cape, the electorate of Victoria West was largely Afrikaans-speaking and conservative, and the seat tended to favour the National Party. Its first MP, however, was John X. Merriman, the last Prime Minister of the Cape Colony, who notably had fought to apply the Cape Qualified Franchise across South Africa, and was one of few MPs to vote against the Natives Land Act, 1913. Merriman moved to the Stellenbosch constituency in 1915, and his South African Party colleague A. G. Visser narrowly held the seat against the fledgling National Party, but the NP would win it in 1920 and hold it for the next decade.

Its most prominent Nationalist MP was Paul Sauer, future chairman of the Sauer Commission and architect of many key apartheid policies, who however represented Victoria West early in his career and would become far more notable after his move to Humansdorp in 1933. His replacement, P. J. H. Luttig, was among the 19 Nationalists who joined D. F. Malan’s Purified National Party, and was defeated for re-election in 1938 by the United Party’s Daan Viljoen. Viljoen, however, appears to have been part of the J. B. M. Hertzog faction of the UP, because in 1943 he recontested the seat as a Nationalist and lost it to the UP candidate J. M. Connan, who in turn narrowly lost to Nationalist and future cabinet minister P. K. Le Roux as part of the nationwide shift at the 1948 election. On its abolition in 1953, Le Roux stood for re-election in neighbouring Prieska.

== Members ==
Election	Member	Party
1910	John X. Merriman	South African
1915	A. G. Visser	South African
1917 by	A. M. Conroy	South African
1920	F. J. du Toit	National
1921	F. J. du Toit	National
1924	F. J. du Toit	National
1929	Paul Sauer	National
1933	P. H. J. Luttig	National
1934	P. H. J. Luttig	GNP
1938	D. T. du P. Viljoen	United
1939	D. T. du P. Viljoen	HNP
1943	J. M. Connan	United
1948	P. K. Le Roux	HNP
1953	constituency abolished	

== Detailed results ==
=== Elections in the 1910s ===
General election 1910: Victoria West
Party	Candidate	Votes	%	±%
South African	John X. Merriman	Unopposed		
South African win (new seat)				

General election 1915: Victoria West
Party	Candidate	Votes	%	±%
South African	A. G. Visser	1,247	52.9	+5.4
National	J. N. Louw	1,110	47.1	New
Majority		137	5.8	N/A
Turnout		2,357	75.4	N/A
South African hold		Swing	N/A	

Victoria West by-election, 26 January 1917
Party	Candidate	Votes	%	±%
South African	A. M. Conroy	Unopposed		
South African hold				

=== Elections in the 1920s ===
General election 1920: Victoria West
Party	Candidate	Votes	%	±%
National	F. J. du Toit	1,521	52.8	+5.7
South African	A. M. Conroy	1,362	47.2	−5.7
Majority		159	5.6	N/A
Turnout		2,883	85.5	+10.1
National gain from South African		Swing	+5.7	

General election 1921: Victoria West
Party	Candidate	Votes	%	±%
National	F. J. du Toit	1,526	50.1	−2.7
South African	H. J. Nel	1,521	49.9	+2.7
Majority		5	0.2	−5.4
Turnout		3,047	82.8	−2.7
National hold		Swing	+2.7	

General election 1924: Victoria West
Party	Candidate	Votes	%	±%
National	F. J. du Toit	1,776	52.7	+2.6
South African	H. J. Nel	1,574	46.7	−3.2
Rejected ballots		22	0.6	N/A
Majority		202	6.0	+5.8
Turnout		3,372	92.4	+9.6
National hold		Swing	+2.9	

General election 1929: Victoria West
Party	Candidate	Votes	%	±%
National	Paul Sauer	1,453	51.0	−1.7
South African	A. M. Conroy	1,366	48.0	+1.3
Rejected ballots		30	1.0	+0.4
Majority		202	3.0	−3.0
Turnout		2,849	87.4	−5.0
National hold		Swing	-1.5	

=== Elections in the 1930s ===
General election 1933: Victoria West
Party	Candidate	Votes	%	±%
National	P. J. H. Luttig	Unopposed		
National hold				

General election 1938: Victoria West
Party	Candidate	Votes	%	±%
United	D. T. du P. Viljoen	3,087	51.6	New
Purified National	P. J. H. Luttig	2,858	47.8	N/A
Rejected ballots		33	0.6	N/A
Majority		229	3.8	N/A
Turnout		5,978	90.9	N/A
United gain from Purified National		Swing	N/A	
