= 1939 South African Senate election =

- 17 November 1939

36 of 44 seats in the Senate
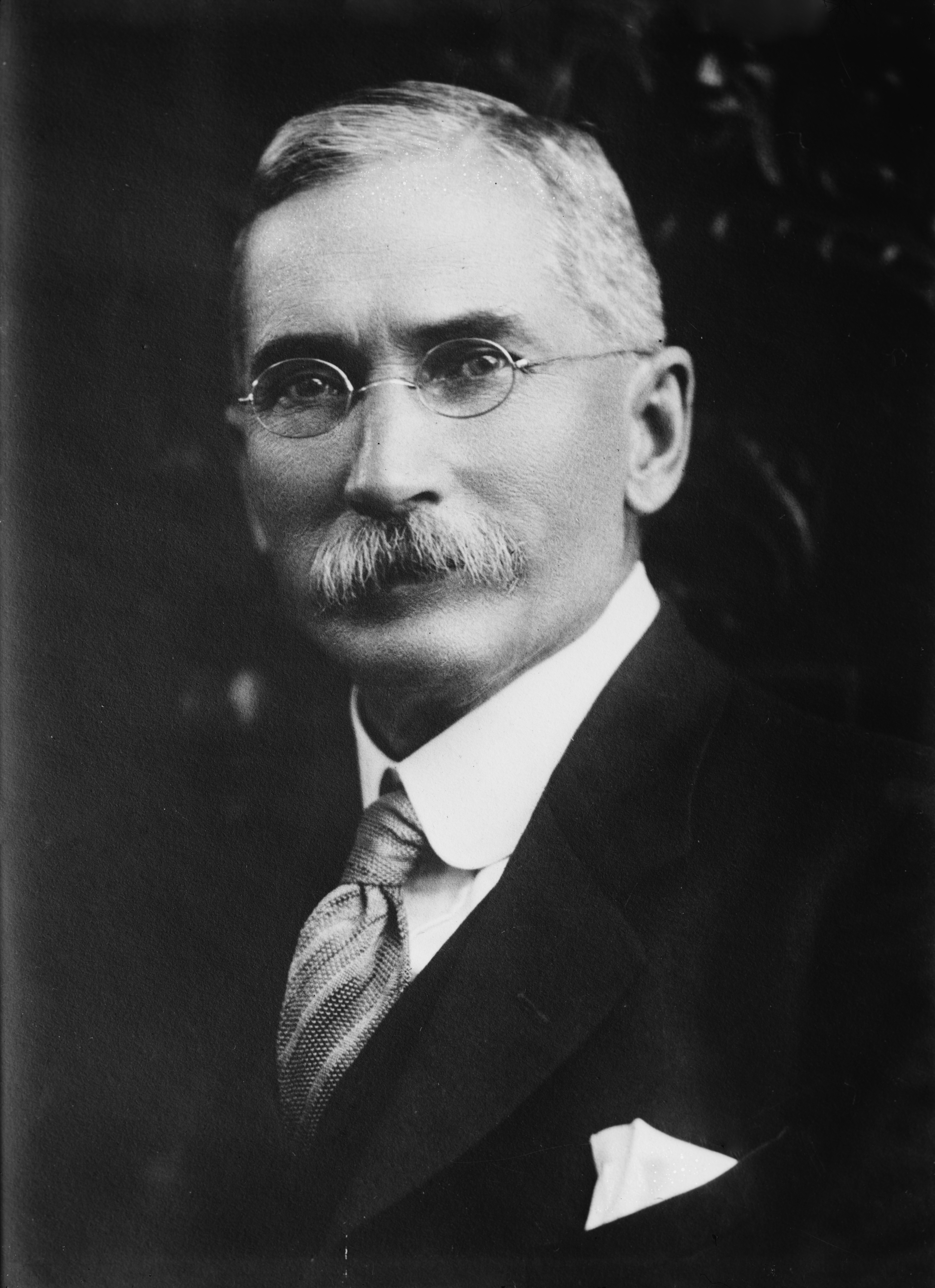

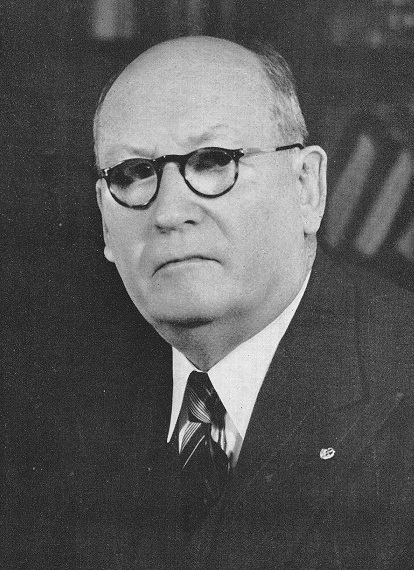

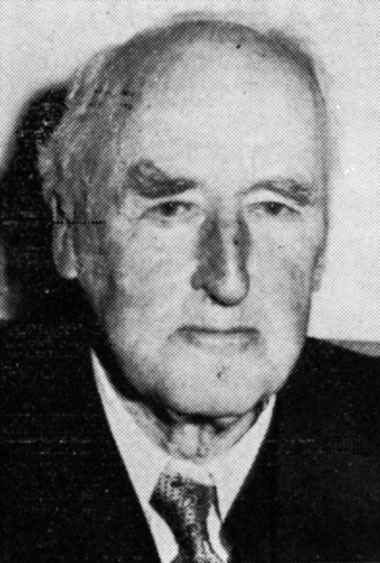
	First party	Second party	Third party
Leader	J. B. M. Hertzog	D. F. Malan	Charles Stallard
Party	United	Purified National	Dominion
Seats won	20	6	2
Percentage	45.45%	13.64%	4.55%
- Seat distribution in the Senate after the election

The election to the fourth Senate of South Africa took place on November 17, 1939, when the Provincial Councils met to each elect eight members of the Senate. After the election and the appointment of eight more Senators by Governor-General Sir Patrick Duncan, the Senate was left with a pro-war majority. There were 24 pro-government Senators (20 United Party including 7 nominated members, 2 Dominion Party and 2 Labour Party) and 16 opposition Senators (10 supporters of General Hertzog including one nominated member, and 6 Purified National Party). The four Native Representative Senators were also pro-war.

After the South African general election of 1948, a Reunited National Party-Afrikaner Party coalition came to power, with minority support in the Senate. The new government used the Senate dissolution power to trigger a new election to the body, which occurred July 28, 1948.
