= Natal Provincial Council =

The Natal Provincial Council was the provincial council of Natal Province in South Africa. It was created by the South Africa Act 1909, with effect from the formation of the Union of South Africa on 31 May 1910.

The Provincial Council continued to exist until 1986, at which point its functions were transferred to a strengthened executive authority appointed by the State President. The province itself was disbanded in 1994, when the provinces were reconstructed.

== Election system and terms ==
The Provincial Council was composed of members elected, by the first past the post electoral system, Originally provinces with fewer than 25 single member electoral divisions, used for the House of Assembly elections (like Natal), were divided into 25 provincial seats. However under the Constitution and Elections Amendment Act 1973, provinces with at least 20 House of Assembly seats (like Natal at the time) used the same electoral divisions for both bodies.

Originally the term of the Provincial Council was five years, from the first meeting of the council after it was elected. The Administrator of the province fixed the date for the meeting, but the Provincial Council had to meet at least once a year. The South African Parliament could alter the term by legislation (as it did when the provincial elections due in 1941 were postponed until 1943), but there was no general power to dissolve a Provincial Council before its statutory term expired.

Under the Constitution and Elections Amendment Act 1973, the State President was given the power to dissolve the Provincial Councils at the same time as the House of Assembly, so that the subsequent provincial election could take place on the same day as a Parliamentary general election.

== Executive committee ==
Executive powers were shared by the administrator and an executive committee. This arrangement was neither the traditional 'Westminster' model (such as that which existed at the Union level of government) or a United States style separation of powers between the executive and legislative parts of the government.

The administrator of the province was described, in section 68 (1) of the South Africa Act 1909, as "a chief executive officer … in whose name all executive acts relating to provincial affairs therein shall be done".

The administrator was appointed, by the national government, for a five-year term and could not be removed except by the Governor General for "cause assigned". The administrator was not responsible to the provincial council and it had no power to remove him from office. The administrator was the chairman of the provincial executive committee and had both an original and casting vote in its deliberations.

The provincial council elected four persons (usually members of the provincial council), who together with the administrator formed the provincial executive committee. The four members were elected by single transferable vote, so were not necessarily all from the same party.

It was provided, by Section 80 of the South Africa Act 1909, that "the executive committee shall on behalf of the provincial council carry on the administration of provincial affairs'’.

== Election results, by party 1943-1981 ==
Election	UP	NP	Lab	PFP	Dom	Ind	Other	Total
1943	16	-	3	-	3	3	-	25
1949	22	2	-	-	-	1	-	25
1954	21	4	-	-	-	-	-	25
1959	21	4	-	-	-	-	-	25
1965	16	8	-	-	-	-	1	25
1970	22	3	-	-	-	-	-	25
1974	16	4	-	-	-	-	-	20
1977	12	8	-	-	-	-	-	20
1981	14	5	-	1	-	-	-	20

Key to parties:-

- UP: United Party (1936–1974), New Republic Party (1977–1981)
- NP: Reunited National Party (1949), National Party (1954–1981)
- Lab: South African Labour Party
- PFP: Progressive Federal Party
- Dom: Dominion Party
- Ind: Independent
