= Vredefort (House of Assembly of South Africa constituency) =

- Former constituency for the South African House of Assembly
- Province: Orange Free State
- Electorate: 10,158 (1960 ref)

Former constituency
- Created: 1910
- Abolished: 1966
- Number of members: 1
- Last MHA: H. J. Klopper (NP)
- Replaced by: Parys

Vredefort was a constituency in the Orange Free State Province of South Africa, which existed from 1910 to 1966. Named after the town of Vredefort, the seat covered a large rural area in the north of the province, bordering the Transvaal. Throughout its existence it elected one member to the House of Assembly.

== Franchise notes ==
When the Union of South Africa was formed in 1910, the electoral qualifications in use in each pre-existing colony were kept in place. In the Orange River Colony, and its predecessor the Orange Free State, the vote was restricted to white men, and as such, elections in the Orange Free State Province were held on a whites-only franchise from the beginning. The franchise was also restricted by property and education qualifications until the 1933 general election, following the passage of the Women's Enfranchisement Act, 1930 and the Franchise Laws Amendment Act, 1931. From then on, the franchise was given to all white citizens aged 21 or over. Non-whites remained disenfranchised until the end of apartheid and the introduction of universal suffrage in 1994.

== History ==
Vredefort, like most of the Orange Free State, was a highly conservative seat throughout its existence and had a largely Afrikaans-speaking electorate. It was held nearly throughout its existence by the National Party, whose founding leader, J. B. M. Hertzog, was enormously popular with the Free State's Afrikaner population. In 1915, the NP first won Vredefort with Colin Fraser Steyn, who resigned the seat after the 1921 general election due to also being elected in the less-safe seat of Bloemfontein South. The resulting by-election saw fellow Nationalist John Henry Munnik hold the seat unopposed.

Hoopstad remained a safe Nationalist seat for the next twenty years, until 1934, when the party split in two after Hertzog decided to join forces with Jan Smuts to create the United Party. While many conservative Afrikaners broke away from the new party to form the Purified National Party under D. F. Malan's leadership, Hoopstad MP Edwin Alfred Conroy stayed loyal to Hertzog and successfully defended his seat at the 1938 general election. Like many of his ex-Nationalist colleagues, however, he broke away once Smuts took over the party and led South Africa into World War II, joining Nicolaas Havenga's Afrikaner Party and contesting his seat under that label in 1943. In that election, Conroy placed third and the Herenigde Nasionale Party took the seat with Henning Klopper, who would hold it until its abolition in 1966, serving as Speaker of the House of Assembly from 1961. When the Vredefort seat was abolished, Klopper stood for and won the new seat of Parys, which covered largely the same area, and which he would continue to represent until 1974.

== Members ==
Election	Member	Party
1910	J. A. P. van der Merwe	Orangia Unie
1915	Colin Fraser Steyn	National
1920	Colin Fraser Steyn	National
1921	Colin Fraser Steyn	National
1921 by	J. H. Munnik	National
1924	J. H. Munnik	National
1929	J. H. Munnik	National
1933	Edwin Alfred Conroy	National
1934	Edwin Alfred Conroy	United
1938	Edwin Alfred Conroy	United
1940	Edwin Alfred Conroy	Afrikaner
1943	Henning Klopper	HNP
1948	Henning Klopper	HNP
1953	Henning Klopper	National
1958	Henning Klopper	National
1961	Henning Klopper	National
1966	constituency abolished	

== Detailed results ==
=== Elections in the 1910s ===
General election 1910: Vredefort
Party	Candidate	Votes	%	±%
Orangia Unie	J. A. P. van der Merwe	Unopposed		
Orangia Unie win (new seat)				

General election 1915: Vredefort
Party	Candidate	Votes	%	±%
National	Colin Fraser Steyn	1,133	60.2	New
South African	J. A. P. van der Merwe	749	39.8	N/A
Majority		384	20.4	N/A
Turnout		1,882	73.1	N/A
National gain from South African		Swing	N/A	

=== Elections in the 1920s ===
General election 1920: Vredefort
Party	Candidate	Votes	%	±%
National	Colin Fraser Steyn	1,205	65.3	+5.1
South African	G. H. Claassens	639	34.7	−5.1
Majority		566	30.6	+10.2
Turnout		1,844	63.1	−10.0
National hold		Swing	+5.1	

General election 1921: Vredefort
Party	Candidate	Votes	%	±%
National	Colin Fraser Steyn	1,270	70.3	+5.0
South African	G. H. Claassens	537	29.7	−5.0
Majority		733	40.6	+10.0
Turnout		1,807	59.4	−3.7
National hold		Swing	+5.0	

Steyn was elected both in Vredefort and Bloemfontein South, and chose to represent Bloemfontein South.

Vredefort by-election, 9 March 1921
Party	Candidate	Votes	%	±%
National	J. H. Munnik	Unopposed		
National hold				

General election 1924: Vredefort
Party	Candidate	Votes	%	±%
National	J. H. Munnik	1,356	67.3	−3.0
South African	L. W. Boshoff	641	31.8	+2.1
Rejected ballots		17	0.9	N/A
Majority		715	35.5	−5.1
Turnout		2,014	70.3	+10.9
National hold		Swing	-2.6	

General election 1929: Vredefort
Party	Candidate	Votes	%	±%
National	J. H. Munnik	1,417	65.8	−1.5
South African	H. O. Vos	699	32.5	+0.7
Rejected ballots		37	1.7	+0.8
Majority		718	33.3	−2.2
Turnout		2,153	80.9	+10.6
National hold		Swing	-1.1	

=== Elections in the 1930s ===
General election 1933: Vredefort
Party	Candidate	Votes	%	±%
National	E. A. Conroy	Unopposed		
National hold				

General election 1938: Vredefort
Party	Candidate	Votes	%	±%
United	E. A. Conroy	3,448	55.1	N/A
Purified National	E. J. J. van der Horst	2,748	43.9	New
Rejected ballots		57	1.0	N/A
Majority		700	11.2	N/A
Turnout		6,253	85.2	N/A
United hold		Swing	N/A	
