= Arthur Barlow (politician) =

South African politician (1876–1962)

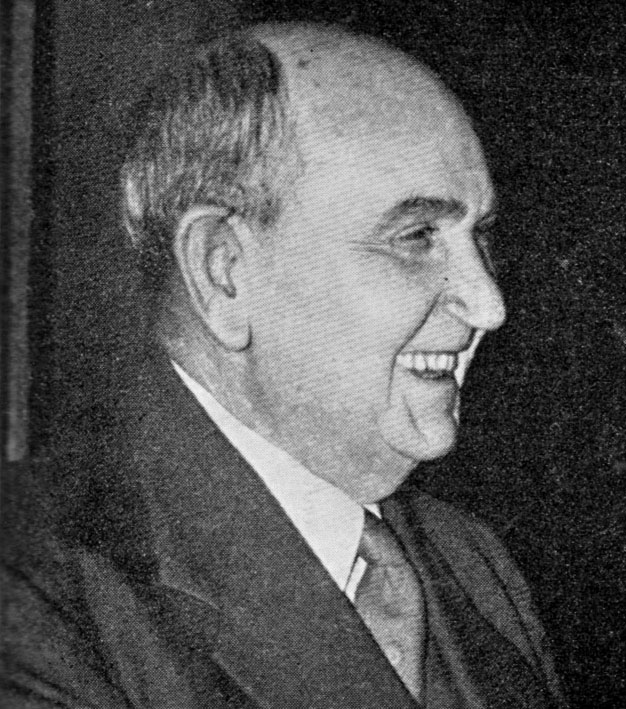
- Barlow later in life

Personal details
- Born: 4 May 1876 Bloemfontein, South Africa
- Died: 18 May 1962 (aged 86) Cape Town, South Africa
- Party: Unionist Party; Labour Party; Central (Roos) Party; United Party; National Conservative Party
- Parliamentary group: House of Assembly

Arthur Godfrey Barlow (4 May 1876 – 18 May 1962) was a South African politician and journalist who represented the Labour Party, United Party and National Conservative Party in the House of Assembly.

== Early life and education ==
Arthur Godfrey Barlow was born 4 May 1876, in Bloemfontein, South Africa to Alfred Barlow, who was a member of the Volksraad of the Orange Free State and owner-editor of The Friend in Bloemfontein.

== Career ==
Barlow began his career as a reporter for The Friend and, at age 23, briefly served as the paper's editor. He later became editor of the Sunday Express and Daily Express of Johannesburg, and the founder of Arthur Barlow's Weekly.

He published his articles in the books Almost in Confidence (1952) and That We May Tread Safely (1960).

== National politics ==
In his early thirties, Barlow joined the Legislative Assembly of the Orange River Colony.

He stood in 1910 general election for Springs as a candidate for the Unionist Party, but was defeated by Walter Madeley. In 1921, he was elected to the House of Assembly as Labour MP for Bloemfontein North. In this position, he worked closely with J. B. M. Hertzog's National Party. In 1925, he tabled a proposal, which was passed by Parliament, that no further British titles should be granted to South African citizens. He was outside Parliament from 1929 until the 1943 general elections and acted as a press gallery commentator for a time.

In 1943, he returned to parliament as the United Party MP for the Johannesburg seat of Hospital. UP leader J.G.N. Strauss suspended him from the party in 1953, along with several other members, for proposing a compromise with the Government over the coloured vote question. He joined Bailey Bekker's National Conservative Party but only remained an MP until the 1958 general election.

In 1957, Parliament passed Barlow's amendment abolishing the official use of the Union Jack in South Africa.

== Personal life ==
Barlow died on 18 May 1962, in Cape Town, South Africa.

== Bibliography ==
- 1952. Almost in Confidence. Johannesburg: Juta & Co.
- 1960. That We May Tread Safely. Cape Town: Tafelberg.

== Sources ==
- Hotz, L.: Barlow, Arthur Godfrey. In: Potgieter, D. J. (ed.). 1970. Standard Encyclopaedia of Southern Africa (Vol. II). Cape Town: Nasionale Opvoedkundige Uitgewery Ltd., pp. 178–179.
