= Bloemfontein (House of Assembly of South Africa constituency) =

- Former constituency for the South African House of Assembly
- Province: Orange Free State
- Electorate: 11,842 (1953)

Former constituency
- Created: 1910; 1938
- Abolished: 1920; 1958
- Number of members: 1
- Last MHA: J. W. J. C. du Plessis (NP)
- Replaced by: Bloemfontein East; Bloemfontein West

Bloemfontein (known between 1938 and 1958 as Bloemfontein City (Afrikaans: Bloemfontein-Stad)) was a constituency in the Orange Free State Province of South Africa, which existed from 1910 to 1920 and from 1938 to 1958. It covered the urban area of Bloemfontein, the provincial capital and the judicial capital of South Africa. Throughout its existence it elected one member to the House of Assembly.

== Franchise notes ==
When the Union of South Africa was formed in 1910, the electoral qualifications in use in each pre-existing colony were kept in place. In the Orange River Colony, and its predecessor the Orange Free State, the vote was restricted to white men, and as such, elections in the Orange Free State Province were held on a whites-only franchise from the beginning. The franchise was also restricted by property and education qualifications until the 1933 general election, following the passage of the Women's Enfranchisement Act, 1930 and the Franchise Laws Amendment Act, 1931. From then on, the franchise was given to all white citizens aged 21 or over. Non-whites remained disenfranchised until the end of apartheid and the introduction of universal suffrage in 1994.

== History ==
While slightly more liberal than the rest of the Free State, Bloemfontein was still only a marginal seat, seeing fierce contests between the United and National parties in its later years. In its first iteration, however, it was the only Free State seat held by the Unionist Party, who took it over South African Party and Labour opposition in 1910 and held it unopposed in 1915 - the only seat in the province not to fall to the National Party in the party's first general election. In 1920, Bloemfontein was reconfigured into a North and a South seat, an arrangement that lasted through most of the 1920s and 30s, but in 1938, the City/District division returned.

The 1938 election was unusual in the Free State's electoral history, because the otherwise-dominant National Party was split down the middle. The party leadership, including Prime Minister J. B. M. Hertzog, had formed the United Party alongside the SAP, but this merger was opposed by a large number of Afrikaner nationalists who formed the Purified National Party under the leadership of D. F. Malan. These two camps fought close and bitter contests in much of the rural Free State, but Bloemfontein was comfortably held by the United Party's Colin Fraser Steyn, who had previously represented Bloemfontein South for the NP in the 1920s. In 1943, with Hertzog dead and most of the old NP reunited under Malan's leadership, every other seat in the province fell again, but Steyn held on until 1953, at which point the seat fell to Nationalist "Sand" du Plessis. In 1958, Bloemfontein was split into an East and a West constituency, and du Plessis left parliament, being appointed Administrator of the Free State the following year.

== Members ==
Election	Member	Party
1910	C. L. Botha	Unionist
1915	H. F. Blaine	Unionist
1920	constituency abolished	

Election	Member	Party
1938	Colin Fraser Steyn	United
1943	Colin Fraser Steyn	United
1948	Colin Fraser Steyn	United
1953	J. W. J. C. du Plessis	National
1958	constituency abolished	

== Detailed results ==
=== Elections in the 1910s ===
General election 1910: Bloemfontein
Party	Candidate	Votes	%	±%
Unionist	C. L. Botha	863	51.9	New
Orangia Unie	W. Ehrlich	653	39.3	New
Labour	J. Duff	146	8.8	New
Majority		310	12.6	N/A
Unionist win (new seat)				

General election 1915: Bloemfontein
Party	Candidate	Votes	%	±%
Unionist	H. F. Blaine	Unopposed		
Unionist hold				

=== Elections in the 1930s ===
General election 1938: Bloemfontein City
Party	Candidate	Votes	%	±%
United	Colin Fraser Steyn	4,618	63.3	New
Purified National	P. J. C. du Plessis	2,132	29.2	New
Independent	Fred Shaw	453	6.2	New
Rejected ballots		93	2.3	N/A
Majority		2,486	34.1	N/A
Turnout		7,296	81.1	N/A
United win (new seat)				
