= P. K. Le Roux =

South African politician (1904-1985)

The Honourable P. K. Le Roux
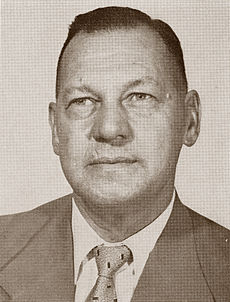

Minister of the Interior
- In office 1966–1968
- Prime Minister: B. J. Vorster
- Preceded by: Jan de Klerk
- Succeeded by: Lourens Muller

Minister of Water Affairs and Agricultural Technical Services
- In office 1958–1966
- Prime Minister: J. G. Strijdom (1958); Hendrik Verwoerd (1958–66)
- Preceded by: Paul Sauer (of Agriculture)

Personal details
- Born: Pieter Mattheus Kruger le Roux; 11 November 1904 De Rust, Cape Colony
- Died: 23 June 1985 (aged 80) Wilderness, Cape Province
- Party: National Party
- Education: University of Stellenbosch

Pieter Mattheus Kruger Le Roux, generally known as P. K. Le Roux (11 November 1904 – 23 June 1985) was a South African National Party politician who served as a Cabinet minister between 1958 and 1968, first as Minister of Water Affairs and Agricultural Technical Services and latterly as Minister of the Interior.

== Biography ==
Pieter Mattheus Kruger Le Roux was born on 11 November 1904 at Doornhoek, a farm near De Rust in the vicinity of Oudtshoorn in what was then the Cape Colony. His parents were Gert Cornelis Le Roux and his wife Margaretha. He attended Outeniqua High School in George, then the University of Stellenbosch.

First elected to parliament in 1948 as the National Party member for Victoria West, Le Roux became the government's Chief Whip in the South African parliament in 1955. He was appointed to the Cabinet as Minister of Water Affairs and Agricultural Technical Services in 1958, shortly before the end of J. G. Strijdom's premiership, and retained this role under Strijdom's successor Hendrik Verwoerd until 1966, when B. J. Vorster became Prime Minister following Verwoerd's assassination. Vorster made Le Roux Minister of the Interior, a post he retained until 1968.

== Election results ==
Year	Constituency	Candidate	Party	Votes	Percentage	Ref
1943	Bredasdorp	P. V. G. van der Byl	United Party	4,326	56.5%	
1943	Bredasdorp	P. M. K. Le Roux	Reunited National Party	3,280	42.9%	
1948	Victoria West	P. M. K. Le Roux	National Party	4,260	49.7%	
1948	Victoria West	J. M. Connan	United Party	4,236	49.4%	
1953	Prieska	P. M. K. Le Roux	National Party	4,964	53.9%	
1953	Prieska	J. M. Connan	United Party	4,186	45.4%	
1958	Oudtshoorn	P. M. K. Le Roux	National Party	6,042	72.3%	
1958	Oudtshoorn	J. J. Joubert	United Party	2,281	27.3%	
1961	Oudtshoorn	P. M. K. Le Roux	National Party	Unopposed	–	
1966	Oudtshoorn	P. M. K. Le Roux	National Party	Unopposed	–	
1970	Oudtshoorn	P. M. K. Le Roux	National Party	Unopposed	–	
