= Minister of Finance v Van Heerden =

South African legal case

- Court: Constitutional Court of South Africa
- Full case name: Minister of Finance and Another v Frederik Van Heerden
- Decided: 29 July 2004
- Docket nos.: CCT 63/03
- Citations: [2004] ZACC 3; 2004 (6) SA 121 (CC); 2004 (11) BCLR 1125 (CC); [2004] 12 BLLR 1181 (CC)

Case history
- Appealed from: Van Heerden v Speaker of Parliament and Others (7067/01, 12 June 2003, unreported) in the High Court of South Africa, Cape of Good Hope Division

Court membership
- Judges sitting: Chaskalson CJ, Langa DCJ, Madala J, Mokgoro J, Moseneke J, Ngcobo J, O’Regan J, Sachs J, Skweyiya J, van der Westhuizen J and Yacoob J

Case opinions
- Provided that they conform with section 9(2) of the Constitution, affirmative action measures do not constitute unfair discrimination. (Unanimous.) Rule 4.2.1 of the Political Office-Bearers Pension Fund is a protected measure under section 9(2). (8:3.)
- Decision by: Moseneke J (Chaskalson, Langa, Madala, O'Regan, Sachs, van der Westhuizen and Yacoob concurring)
- Concurrence: Sachs J
- Concur/dissent: Mokgoro J (Sachs and Skweyiya concurring); Ngcobo J (Sachs concurring)

Minister of Finance and Another v Van Heerden is a landmark decision of the Constitutional Court of South Africa on the constitutionality of affirmative action. Delivered in July 2004, it marked the court's first application of the affirmative action clause in section 9(2) of the Bill of Rights. In a majority judgment written by Justice Dikgang Moseneke, the court held that section 9(2) precludes claims of unfair discrimination against any affirmative action measures pursued in conformance with that provision.

The case arose from a constitutional challenge brought by politician Frik van Heerden against the government pension scheme for political office-bearers. The Cape High Court had found that the rules of the pension scheme discriminated unfairly against politicians who held office during apartheid, but the Constitutional Court unanimously rejected this argument. Writing for the eight-judge majority, Moseneke held that the pension scheme rules constituted a form of affirmative action under section 9(2) and therefore were not required to meet the stricter standard of scrutiny applied in unfair discrimination disputes. The three-judge minority, while agreeing with Moseneke's general interpretation of section 9(2), held that the relevant rules were not protected under section 9(2); however, they also found that the rules did not constitute unfair discrimination.

== Background ==
The plaintiff, Frik van Heerden, represented the National Party in the Parliament of South Africa from 1987 until 1999, first as a member of the apartheid-era House of Assembly and then, after the 1994 general election, as a member of the non-racial National Assembly. The case concerned pension fund arrangements applying to South African politicians who, like van Heerden, held political office both before and after the post-apartheid transition.

In the run-up to the election, van Heerden had joined the Closed Pension Fund. This fund was established during the negotiations to end apartheid to assuage the anxieties of members of the apartheid Parliament; it was fully funded and catered exclusively to individuals who held political office before the 1994 election. Meanwhile, in late 1998, the first post-apartheid government legislated the new Political Office-Bearers Pension Fund, which would govern political pensions henceforth but which would also have retrospective effect from the date of the 1994 election.

Rule 4.2.1 of the new fund's rules prescribed that, for the period between the 1994 election and the 1999 election, employer contributions to each member's benefits would differ according to their category of membership. In particular, politicians who were also members of the Closed Pension Fund were deemed to be "Category C" members of the Political Office-Bearers Pension Fund, and employer contributions to their accounts would be lower than the contributions made to the accounts of politicians who were not members of the Closed Pension Fund. Because all "Category C" members held office during apartheid, they were primarily white and primarily affiliated with the political parties that had been represented in the apartheid Parliament.

== Court action ==
Van Heerden sued in the High Court of South Africa, contending that Rule 4.2.1 was inconsistent with the Constitution of South Africa. In particular, he claimed that, insofar as the rule disfavoured politicians who had joined the Closed Pension Fund, it was unfairly discriminatory and was therefore offensive to the right to equality, guaranteed by section 9 of the Constitution. On the other hand, the state argued that the differentiation prescribed by Rule 4.2.1 constituted a form of affirmative action that was permissible in terms of section 9 of the Constitution; membership categories were delineated according to indicators of different members' level of need, and the rule therefore promoted the distribution of pensions on an equitable basis. While section 9(3) prohibits unfair discrimination, section 9(2) expressly authorises affirmative action measures to promote the achievement of equality among previously disadvantaged persons.

Section 9 of the Bill of Rights

(1) Everyone is equal before the law and has the right to equal protection and benefit of the law.
(2) Equality includes the full and equal enjoyment of all rights and freedoms. To promote the achievement of equality, legislative and other measures designed to protect or advance persons, or categories of persons, disadvantaged by unfair discrimination may be taken.
(3) The state may not unfairly discriminate directly or indirectly against anyone on one or more grounds, including race, gender, sex, pregnancy, marital status, ethnic or social origin, colour, sexual orientation, age, disability, religion, conscience, belief, culture, language and birth...
(5) Discrimination on one or more of the grounds listed in subsection (3) is unfair unless it is established that the discrimination is fair.

In June 2003, Judge Wilfred Thring of the Cape High Court handed down judgment in van Heerden's favour, agreeing that Rule 4.2.1. was unfairly discriminatory, unconstitutional, and invalid. Aggrieved, the Political Office-Bearers Pension Fund and the Minister of Finance sought leave to appeal the High Court's judgment in the Constitutional Court of South Africa. The Constitutional Court heard argument on 24 February 2004 and delivered judgment on 29 July 2004.

== Majority judgment ==
The Constitutional Court's majority judgment was written by Justice Dikgang Moseneke and had the support of an eight-member majority of the court, which also included Chief Justice Arthur Chaskalson, Deputy Chief Justice Pius Langa, and Justices Tholie Madala, Kate O'Regan, Albie Sachs, Johann van der Westhuizen, and Zak Yacoob. The majority upheld the state's appeal, finding that Rule 4.2.1 was compliant with section 9 of the Constitution and that the High Court's order therefore stood to be set aside.

=== Standard of scrutiny ===
The majority judgment opened with an exposition of the equality clause, section 9 of the Constitution. Moseneke acknowledged that, in equality litigation to date, the court had dealt primarily with the prohibition against unfair discrimination in section 9(3). Cases such as Harksen v Lane set out a rigorous test for determining whether differentiation rose to unfair discrimination. Moreover, in terms of section 9(5), discrimination on the grounds of race is presumed to be unfair unless it is established that the discrimination is fair. In the High Court, this provision had been used to place a weighty onus on the state to justify the fairness of Rule 4.2.1.

However, Moseneke held that the High Court's approach was misconceived. In order to establish the constitutionality of its affirmative action measures (or "restitutionary measures", in Moseneke's term), the state need not meet the strict standard applied in unfair discrimination cases, but can instead mount a successful defence in terms of section 9(2) of the Constitution, which authorises such measures insofar as they promote the achievement of equality. If a measure properly falls within the ambit of section 9(2), it does not – and is not presumed to – constitute unfair discrimination, even if it involves racial discrimination. Indeed, not only are such measures permitted by section 9, but they are actively endorsed by section 9, the overarching value of which is substantive equality. Per Moseneke:

Such measures are not in themselves a deviation from, or invasive of, the right to equality guaranteed by the Constitution. They are not "reverse discrimination" or "positive discrimination" as argued by the claimant in this case. They are integral to the reach of our equality protection... Remedial measures are not a derogation from, but a substantive and composite part of, the equality protection envisaged by the provisions of section 9 and of the Constitution as a whole.

=== Section 9(2) test ===
Section 9(2) provides that, "To promote the achievement of equality, legislative and other measures designed to protect or advance persons, or categories of persons, disadvantaged by unfair discrimination may be taken." For Moseneke, this provision provides an "internal test" for permissible affirmative action measures, and he disambiguated that test into a three-part enquiry, which, in the majority's opinion, Rule 4.2.1 passed.

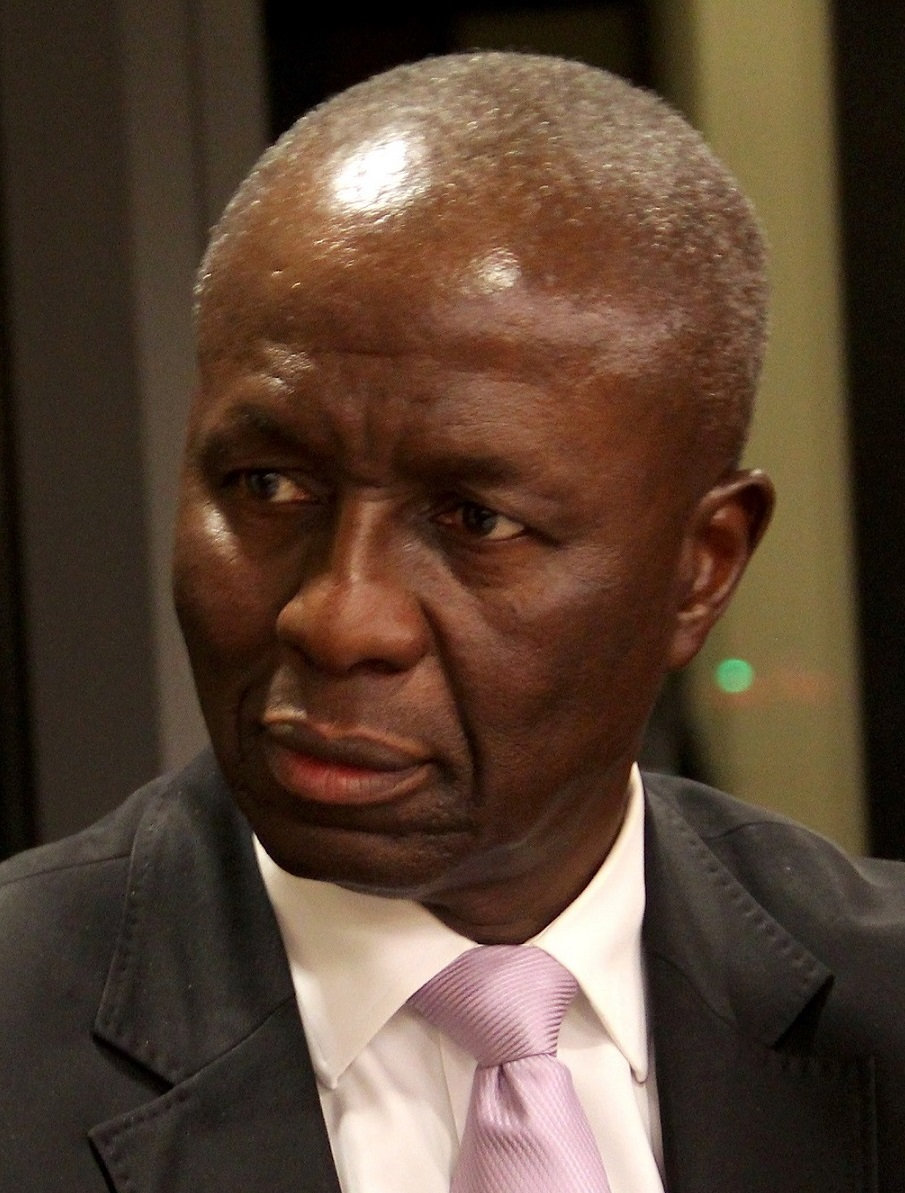
Justice Dikgang Moseneke's judgment developed the authoritative test for applying section 9(2) of the Constitution.

First, to qualify for protection under section 9(2), the measure must target persons or categories of persons who have been disadvantaged by unfair discrimination. In this respect, it is sufficient to show that "an overwhelming majority of members of the favoured class are persons designated as disadvantaged by unfair exclusion"; a measure is not disqualified in virtue of "exceptional or 'hard cases' or windfall beneficiaries". Second, the measure must be designed to protect or advance such persons or categories of persons. That requirement also should not be applied too rigidly: it is met by remedial measures that are "reasonably capable of attaining the desired outcome", and is not met by measures that are "arbitrary, capricious or display naked preference". Third, and finally, the measure must promote the achievement of equality. In applying this requirements, courts should have regard to the constitutional vision of "a non-racial, non-sexist society in which each person will be recognised and treated as a human being of equal worth and dignity".

== Minority judgments ==
Justice Yvonne Mokgoro wrote a minority judgment, which was joined by Justice Sachs and Justice Thembile Skweyiya. She agreed with Moseneke's exposition of the inter-relationship between different provisions of section 9, with his view that affirmative action measures required a unique standard of review, and with the basic elements of the test he proposed under section 9(2). However, she disagreed with Moseneke's application of the first element of the test, that requiring the targeting of previously disadvantaged persons; in the present case, she found that the state had not established that the Rule 4.2.1 measure was "carefully crafted" enough to meet this requirement. Section 9(2) protections therefore did not apply in the present case. However, Mokgoro also found that Rule 4.2.1 did not constitute unfair discrimination, and the appeal therefore nonetheless stood to be upheld.

Justice Sandile Ngcobo also wrote a separate judgment, joined by Justice Sachs, in which he, like Mokgoro, expressed doubts as to whether, on the facts, the Rule 4.2.1 measure targeted previously disadvantaged persons or groups. However, Ngcobo was also satisfied that Rule 4.2.1 did not constitute unfair discrimination.

Finally, Justice Sachs wrote a separate judgment to explain the considerations that had led him to concur in all three other judgments filed. Per Sachs, despite the differences in their findings, each judgment shared the same "basic constitutional rationale", especially a commitment to substantive equality. He was therefore not convinced by the proposition that there was any substantial difference in the standards of review applied under section 9(2) and section 9(3) respectively; the difference was merely "technical". It was therefore unsurprising that Rule 4.2.1 had been upheld by the minorities as fair discrimination just as it had been upheld by the majority as a restitutional measure.

== Significance ==
Van Heerden marked the first time that the Constitutional Court considered section 9(2) of the Constitution, and it was therefore a landmark case in the constitutional law of affirmative action. For many commentators, the most significant aspect of the decision was the majority's choice not to test affirmative action measures for unfair discrimination but instead to apply an internal test based on section 9(2) alone. This choice surprised some and disappointed others. In particular, Van Heerden's section 9(2) test, often characterised as a rationality test, was viewed as less strict and more deferential than the fairness standard applied in unfair discrimination cases.

In the years after Van Heerden was handed down, the judgment was arguably applied inconsistently – or even ignored – in lower courts in various contexts. In particular, although the Van Heerden court reviewed a state policy, its findings were applicable cases in the Labour Court about employment discrimination, including by private employers. Thus the "sequel" to Van Heerden was SAPS v Barnard, the Constitutional Court's first decision on affirmative action in the context of employment discrimination or employment equity.

Debate about Van Heerden was revived again in 2018, when the Constitutional Court decided Minister of Constitutional Development v South African Restructuring and Insolvency Practitioners Association. The central question in that case was whether racial quotas qualified for constitutional protection under the section 9(2) test set out in Van Heerden.

== See also ==
- Strict scrutiny
- Black Economic Empowerment
