= Minister of Justice and Constitutional Development v SARIPA =

2018 South African legal case

- Court: Constitutional Court of South Africa
- Full case name: Minister of Justice and Constitutional Development and Another v South African Restructuring and Insolvency Practitioners Association and Others
- Decided: 5 July 2018
- Docket nos.: CCT 13/17
- Citations: [2018] ZACC 20; 2018 (5) SA 349 (CC); 2018 (9) BCLR 1099 (CC)

Case history
- Prior actions: SARIPA v Minister of Justice and Constitutional Development; In Re: Concerned Insolvency Practitioners Association v Minister of Justice and Constitutional Development [2015] ZAWCHC 1 in the High Court of South Africa, Western Cape Division; Minister of Justice and Constitutional Development v SARIPA [2016] ZASCA 196 in the Supreme Court of Appeal

Court membership
- Judges sitting: Zondo ACJ, Cameron J, Froneman J, Jafta J, Madlanga J, Mhlantla J, Theron J, Kathree-Setiloane AJ, Kollapen AJ and Zondi AJ

Case opinions
- Clauses 6 and 7 of the Policy on the Appointment of Insolvency Practitioners are arbitrary and unconstitutional to the extent that they differentiate between groups of previously disadvantaged individuals on the basis of the date that each individual obtained citizenship. (Unanimous.) The clauses are also arbitrary, irrational, and unconstitutional in their entirety. (7:3.)
- Decision by: Jafta J (Zondo, Cameron, Kathree-Setiloane, Mhlantla, Theron and Zondi concurring)
- Dissent: Madlanga J (Kollapen and Froneman concurring)

Minister of Justice and Constitutional Development and Another v South African Restructuring and Insolvency Practitioners Association and Others is a 2018 decision of the Constitutional Court of South Africa. The court struck down provisions of the government's Policy on the Appointment of Insolvency Practitioners, an affirmative action measure for the appointment of insolvency practitioners by the Master of the High Court. Justice Chris Jafta wrote the court's majority judgment and a three-person minority joined a dissent written by Justice Mbuyiseli Madlanga.

== Background ==
The matter concerned the Policy on the Appointment of Insolvency Practitioners promulgated by the Minister of Justice and Constitutional Development, Jeff Radebe, in February 2014. As required by various legislation, the policy regulated the process for the appointment of insolvency practitioners to act as trustees of insolvent estates in insolvency proceedings under the Insolvency Act, 1936. Insolvency practice was historically dominated by white men, and section 158(2) of the Insolvency Act explicitly licensed the Minister to consider affirmative action in making the policy.

The impugned clauses of the policy were related to these affirmative action considerations. In terms of Clause 6, the Master of the High Court was required to maintain an alphabetical list of insolvency practitioners who were eligible for appointment as trustees. The list was divided into four categories according to each respective practitioner's gender, the date on which he became a citizen of South Africa, and his membership in a racial group that was discriminated against under apartheid (whether African, Coloured, Indian, or Chinese). Thus Category A comprised African, Coloured, Indian and Chinese women who became citizens before 27 April 1994 (the date on which the Interim Constitution came into effect); Category B comprised African, Coloured, Indian and Chinese men who became citizens before 27 April 1994; and Category C comprised white women who became citizens before 27 April 1994. Category D, the largest category, was a residual category for individuals not listed elsewhere: it comprised all individuals who became citizens on or after 27 April 1994, as well as all white men, regardless of when their citizenship was obtained.

Under clause 7 of the policy, the Master of the High Court was required to appoint trustees from each category, in alphabetical order, in a ratio of 4: 3: 2: 1 from Category A, B, C, and D respectively. The effect was that practitioners in Category D were severely disadvantaged in the assignment of insolvent estates.

== Court action ==
The South African Restructuring and Insolvency Practitioners Association and the Concerned Insolvency Practitioners Association launched separate applications in the High Court of South Africa, seeking to review the policy and interdicts its implementation. Their applications, joined by the National Association of Managing Agents, Solidarity, and the Vereeniging van Regslui vir Afrikaans, were conjoined for hearing in the High Court. On 13 January 2015, the Western Cape High Court found in their favour, upholding three of their arguments: the Minister exceeded his powers in making the policy, fettering the Master's discretion; the policy was irrational; and the policy violated the right to equality guaranteed in section 9 of the Constitution.

The Minister and the Chief Master of the High Court appealed in the Supreme Court of Appeal, which dismissed the appeal on 2 December 2016. In a unanimous judgment, Judge of Appeal Rammaka Mathopo held that the policy effectively required the appointment of practitioners in accordance with a quota; to this extent, it was arbitrary and capricious and violated the constitutional right to equality. The state therefore lodged a final appeal in the Constitutional Court of South Africa, which heard argument on 2 November 2017 and delivered judgment on 5 July 2018.

== Majority judgment ==
The Constitutional Court's majority judgment was written by Justice Chris Jafta and was joined by Acting Chief Justice Raymond Zondo; Justices Edwin Cameron, Nonkosi Mhlantla, and Leona Theron; and Acting Justices Fayeeza Kathree-Setiloane and Dumisani Zondi. The majority dismissed the appeal, upholding the lower courts' findings that the policy was unconstitutional.

The decision turned primarily on the application of section 9(2) of the Constitution, which authorised restitutionary affirmative action measures. Per section 9(2), "To promote the achievement of equality, legislative and other measures designed to protect or advance persons, or categories of persons, disadvantaged by unfair discrimination may be taken." The state contended that the impugned policy was a measure protected by section 9(2), but the High Court, applying the test designed in Minister of Finance v Van Heerden, had found that the policy was not justifiable in those terms. The majority agreed. Per the Van Heerden test, a section 9(2) measure "must be reasonably capable of achieving equality", but in this case, "In light of the paucity of information on the implementation of the policy, it cannot be said that the policy is likely to achieve the goal of equality."

The composition of Category D was singled out for special criticism. The majority objected strongly to the policy's directive of grouping white men practitioners (a numerous group) with all non-white individuals and white women who obtained citizenship after 27 April 1994, a group which included any young practitioners born after that date. According to Jafta, this practice undermined the policy's stated objective of promoting equality:

On the Minister's version, the purpose of the policy is to address the inequality created by the racist practices of apartheid which resulted in the current situation of white males constituting a majority among practitioners... [but] category D perpetuates the disadvantage which the policy seeks to eradicate. It lumps African, Coloured, Indian and Chinese practitioners with the advantaged white males who dominate the entire industry in terms of numbers and affords everybody in this category an equal opportunity of being appointed. Moreover, the category impermissibly discriminates against other races on the ground that they became citizens on or after 27 April 1994. To this extent the policy does not constitute a restitutionary measure envisaged in section 9(2) of the Constitution. A section 9(2) measure may not discriminate against persons belonging to the disadvantaged group whose interests it seeks to advance.

On similar grounds, the majority found that it was arbitrary to differentiate among groups of disadvantaged persons on the basis of the date they became citizens; the policy therefore licensed unequal treatment in violation of the right to equality. Moreover, insofar as the state had failed to establish a rational connection between the provisions of the policy and its stated aim of promoting equality, the policy was irrational. It was therefore unconstitutional and should be set aside.

== Dissenting judgment ==
Justice Mbuyiseli Madlanga wrote a dissenting judgment, joined by Justice Johan Froneman and Acting Justice Jody Kollapen, which opened with a quotation from "Harlem". This minority agreed with the majority's criticism of the inclusion of citizenship date as a criterion for membership in Category D; it, too, would have invalidated the policy to that extent. In other respects, however, the minority found that the policy was neither arbitrary nor irrational and that it received constitutional protection as a restitutionary affirmative action measure in terms of section 9(2). In particular, Madlanga argued that the policy passed the Van Heerden test because, "Manifestly in time the measure must, and will, transform the insolvency industry. It affords section 9(2) beneficiaries significant advantage, albeit in varying degrees."
