= Great Depression in South Africa =

Severe economic depression that took place in South Africa

The Great Depression had a pronounced economic and political effect on South Africa, as it did on most nations at the time. As world trade slumped, demand for South African agricultural and mineral exports fell drastically. It is believed that the social discomfort caused by the depression was a contributing factor in the 1933 split between the "gesuiwerde" (purified) and "smelter" (fusionist) factions within the National Party and the National Party's subsequent fusion with the South African Party.

The sudden lack of demand destroyed prices on commodities that were profitable to many Afrikaner farmers. For example, the price of wool fell 75% between 1925 and 1933. A large portion of the agricultural industry were unable to repay mortgages on their over-capitalized farms. Thus, the National Party found itself losing favour with one of its largest constituencies—conservative, rural Boers.

South Africa was saved from a complete collapse by the gold mining industry—one of the largest and most advanced at the time—as the price of gold rose rapidly as investors sought a haven from the dead securities market. Growing gold exports compensated somewhat for the loss of other trade revenue. However, like the situation with the Boers, the National party lost support as the weak economy forced the gold corporations to replace white labourers with lower-paid blacks.

The National Party-led government staved off bankruptcy by raising taxes on imports, petrol and postage, amongst other things. This "unfair" taxation led to further dislike of the ruling government.

The coalition government between Jan Smuts and J.B.M. Hertzog was successful in 1933 partly because Smuts presented the public with a mock budget showing how South Africa's economic malaise could be lifted by floating the South African pound and removing it from the Gold standard, thus making exports more attractive, and creating a scenario in which undue taxation could be removed.

== See also ==
- Economic history of South Africa
- Great Depression in the United Kingdom
