= Prieska (House of Assembly of South Africa constituency) =

South African constituency, 1910–1994

- Former constituency for the South African House of Assembly
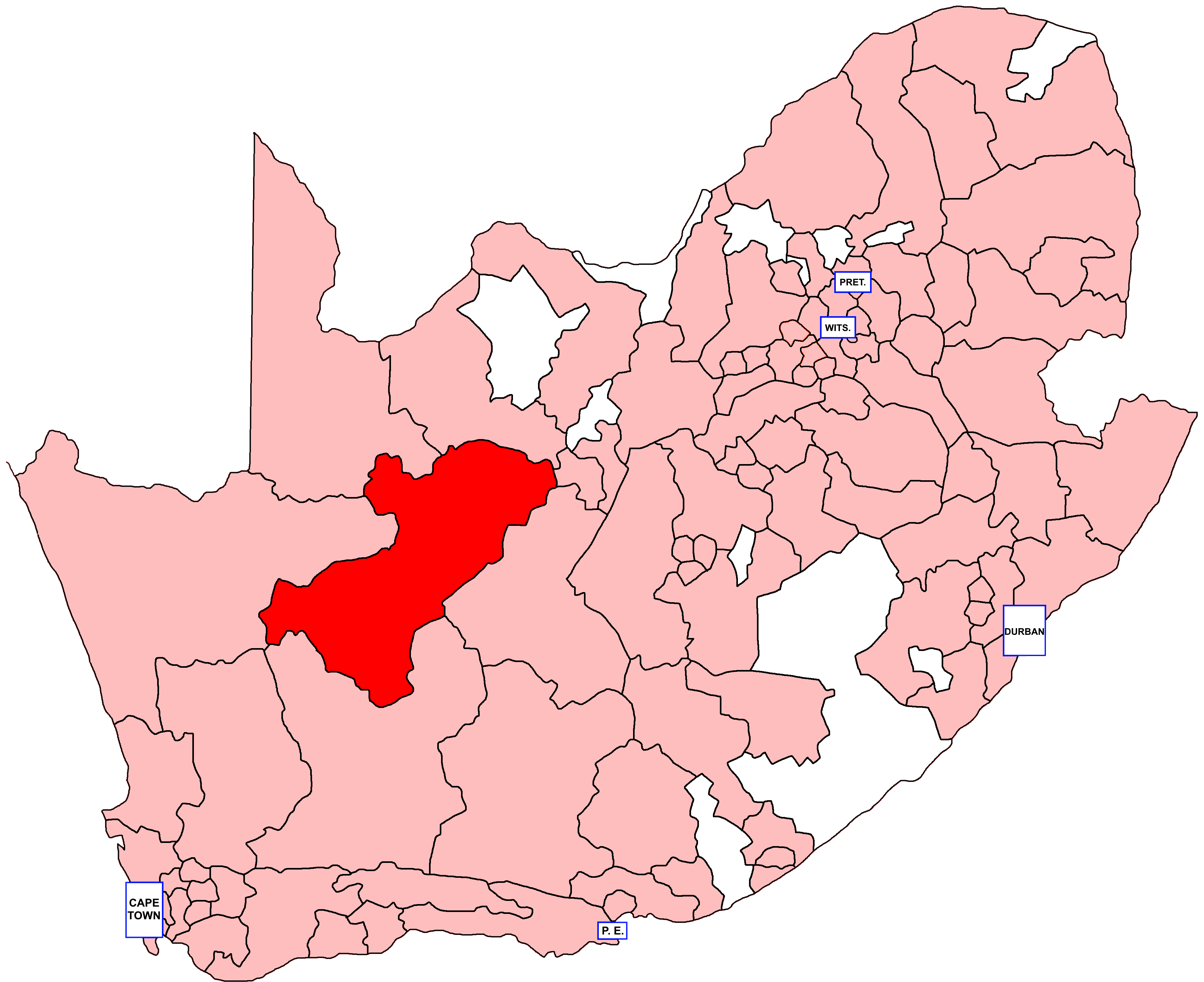
- Location of Prieska within South Africa (1981)
- Province: Cape of Good Hope
- Electorate: 14,474 (1989)

Former constituency
- Created: 1910; 1929; 1953
- Abolished: 1924; 1948; 1994
- Number of members: 1
- Last MHA: Kraai van Niekerk (NP)
- Replaced by: Northern Cape

Prieska was a constituency in the Cape Province of South Africa, which existed in three separate iterations between 1910 and 1994. It covered a large rural area along the Orange River, centred on the town of Prieska. Throughout its existence it elected one member to the House of Assembly and one to the Cape Provincial Council.

== Franchise notes ==
When the Union of South Africa was formed in 1910, the electoral qualifications in use in each pre-existing colony were kept in place. The Cape Colony had implemented a “colour-blind” franchise known as the Cape Qualified Franchise, which included all adult literate men owning more than £75 worth of property (controversially raised from £25 in 1892), and this initially remained in effect after the colony became the Cape Province. As of 1908, 22,784 out of 152,221 electors in the Cape Colony were “Native or Coloured”. Eligibility to serve in Parliament and the Provincial Council, however, was restricted to whites from 1910 onward.

The first challenge to the Cape Qualified Franchise came with the Women's Enfranchisement Act, 1930 and the Franchise Laws Amendment Act, 1931, which extended the vote to women and removed property qualifications for the white population only – non-white voters remained subject to the earlier restrictions. In 1936, the Representation of Natives Act removed all black voters from the common electoral roll and introduced three “Native Representative Members”, white MPs elected by the black voters of the province and meant to represent their interests in particular. A similar provision was made for Coloured voters with the Separate Representation of Voters Act, 1951, and although this law was challenged by the courts, it went into effect in time for the 1958 general election, which was thus held with all-white voter rolls for the first time in South African history. The all-white franchise would continue until the end of apartheid and the introduction of universal suffrage in 1994.

== History ==
The Prieska constituency had a somewhat chequered early history, disappearing and reappearing several times. However, aside from its first iteration, it favoured the National Party, with only the wartime election in 1943 returning a United Party member. In its last iteration, from 1953 to 1994, the National Party held it throughout. Its last MP, Kraai van Niekerk, served as Minister of Agriculture under both F. W. de Klerk and Nelson Mandela.

== Members ==
Election	Member	Party
1910	P. G. Kuhn	South African
1915	J. P. Coetzee	South African
1920	J. H. Conradie	National
1921	J. P. Coetzee	South African
1924	constituency abolished	

Election	Member	Party
1929	C. H. Geldenhuys	National
1933	C. H. Geldenhuys	National
1934	C. H. Geldenhuys	GNP
1938	C. H. Geldenhuys	GNP
1943	A. C. du Toit	United
1948	constituency abolished	

Election	Member	Party
1953	P. K. Le Roux	National
1958	A. H. Stander	National
1961	A. H. Stander	National
1966	J. W. L. Horn	National
1970	J. W. L. Horn	National
1974	J. W. L. Horn	National
1977	J. W. L. Horn	National
1981	Kraai van Niekerk	National
1987	Kraai van Niekerk	National
1989	Kraai van Niekerk	National
1994	constituency abolished	

== Detailed results ==
=== Elections in the 1910s ===
General election 1910: Prieska
Party	Candidate	Votes	%	±%
South African	P. G. Kuhn	Unopposed		
South African win (new seat)				

General election 1915: Prieska
Party	Candidate	Votes	%	±%
South African	J. P. Coetzee	1,154	55.7	N/A
National	J. H. Conradie	914	44.1	New
South African	R. W. F. Steyn	4	0.2	New
Majority		240	11.6	N/A
Turnout		2,072	71.3	N/A
South African hold		Swing	N/A	

=== Elections in the 1920s ===
General election 1920: Prieska
Party	Candidate	Votes	%	±%
National	J. H. Conradie	1,249	50.8	+6.7
South African	J. P. Coetzee	1,209	49.2	−6.5
Majority		40	1.6	N/A
Turnout		2,458	73.7	+2.4
National gain from South African		Swing	+6.6	

General election 1921: Prieska
Party	Candidate	Votes	%	±%
South African	J. P. Coetzee	1,501	50.3	+1.1
National	J. H. Conradie	1,483	49.7	−1.1
Majority		18	0.6	N/A
Turnout		2,984	78.9	+5.2
South African gain from National		Swing	+1.1	

General election 1929: Prieska
Party	Candidate	Votes	%	±%
National	C. H. Geldenhuys	1,352	60.6	New
South African	J. P. Coetzee	863	38.7	New
Rejected ballots		17	0.7	N/A
Majority		489	21.9	N/A
Turnout		2,232	75.1	N/A
National win (new seat)				

=== Elections in the 1930s ===
General election 1933: Prieska
Party	Candidate	Votes	%	±%
National	C. H. Geldenhuys	Unopposed		
National hold				

General election 1938: Prieska
Party	Candidate	Votes	%	±%
Purified National	C. H. Geldenhuys	3,042	57.5	N/A
United	M. M. Louw	2,450	41.4	New
Rejected ballots		66	1.1	N/A
Majority		952	16.1	N/A
Turnout		5,918	90.0	N/A
Purified National hold		Swing	N/A	
