= Bloemfontein District (House of Assembly of South Africa constituency) =

- Bloemfontein-Distrik
- Former constituency for the South African House of Assembly
- Province: Orange Free State
- Electorate: 13,586 (1970)

Former constituency
- Created: 1910; 1938
- Abolished: 1920; 1974
- Number of members: 1
- Last MHA: J. A. Schlebusch (NP)
- Replaced by: Bloemfontein East; Bloemfontein North; Bloemfontein West

Bloemfontein District (Afrikaans: Bloemfontein-Distrik) was a constituency in the Orange Free State Province of South Africa, which existed from 1910 to 1920 and from 1938 to 1974. It covered the areas surrounding Bloemfontein, the provincial capital and the judicial capital of South Africa. Throughout its existence it elected one member to the House of Assembly.

== Franchise notes ==
When the Union of South Africa was formed in 1910, the electoral qualifications in use in each pre-existing colony were kept in place. In the Orange River Colony, and its predecessor the Orange Free State, the vote was restricted to white men, and as such, elections in the Orange Free State Province were held on a whites-only franchise from the beginning. The franchise was also restricted by property and education qualifications until the 1933 general election, following the passage of the Women's Enfranchisement Act, 1930 and the Franchise Laws Amendment Act, 1931. From then on, the franchise was given to all white citizens aged 21 or over. Non-whites remained disenfranchised until the end of apartheid and the introduction of universal suffrage in 1994.

== History ==
Like most of the Orange Free State, Bloemfontein District was a highly conservative seat throughout its existence and had a largely Afrikaans-speaking electorate. Its first MP, Johannes Petrus Gerhardus Steyl, was elected for the provincial Orangia Unie party, but later joined the South African Party and lost re-election to Johannes Wilhelmus Gysbert Steyn of the National Party, whose leader J. B. M. Hertzog enjoyed widespread popularity in the province. In 1920, Bloemfontein was reconfigured into a North and a South seat, an arrangement that lasted through most of the 1920s and 30s, but in 1938, the City/District division returned.

The 1938 election was unusual in the Free State's electoral history, because the otherwise-dominant National Party was split down the middle. The party leadership, including Hertzog, had formed the United Party alongside the SAP, but this merger was opposed by a large number of Afrikaner nationalists who formed the Purified National Party under the leadership of D. F. Malan. These two camps fought close and bitter contests in much of the rural Free State, and Bloemfontein District was no exception. One of the nineteen Nationalist MPs who joined Malan's camp was Bloemfontein South MP Jan Jacobus Haywood, who contested Bloemfontein District in 1938 and won it by a convincing margin. It remained a safe seat for the NP until its abolition in 1974, at which point it was split between the recreated Bloemfontein North and the two seats (East and West) that had previously made up the city of Bloemfontein. All three of these seats were also safe for the governing party and remained so until the end of apartheid.

== Members ==
| Election | Member | Party |
|---|---|---|
| 1910 | J. P. S. Steyl | Orangia Unie |
| 1915 | J. W. G. Steyn | National |
| 1920 | constituency abolished | |

| Election | Member | Party |
|---|---|---|
| 1938 | J. J. Haywood | GNP |
| 1943 | J. J. Haywood | HNP |
| 1948 | J. J. Haywood | HNP |
| 1948 by | P. J. C. du Plessis | HNP |
| 1953 | P. J. C. du Plessis | National |
| 1958 | P. J. C. du Plessis | National |
| 1961 | J. A. Schlebusch | National |
| 1966 | J. A. Schlebusch | National |
| 1970 | J. A. Schlebusch | National |
| 1974 | constituency abolished | |

== Detailed results ==
=== Elections in the 1910s ===
General election 1910: Bloemfontein District
| Party | Candidate | Votes | % | ±% |
|---|---|---|---|---|
| Orangia Unie | J. P. S. Steyl | 897 | 52.0 | New |
| Unionist | D. G. Falck | 828 | 48.0 | New |
| Majority | | 69 | 4.0 | N/A |
| Orangia Unie win (new seat) | | | | |

General election 1915: Bloemfontein District
| Party | Candidate | Votes | % | ±% |
|---|---|---|---|---|
| National | J. W. G. Steyn | 1,095 | 66.7 | New |
| South African | J. P. S. Steyl | 546 | 33.3 | −18.7 |
| Majority | | 549 | 33.4 | N/A |
| Turnout | | 1,641 | 77.3 | N/A |
| National gain from South African | | Swing | N/A | |

=== Elections in the 1930s ===
General election 1938: Bloemfontein District
| Party | Candidate | Votes | % | ±% |
|---|---|---|---|---|
| Purified National | J. J. Haywood | 3,772 | 54.5 | New |
| United | W. C. Easby | 3,046 | 44.0 | New |
| Labour | J. A. Olivier | 68 | 1.0 | New |
| Rejected ballots | | 30 | 0.5 | N/A |
| Majority | | 726 | 10.5 | N/A |
| Turnout | | 6,916 | 82.0 | N/A |
| Purified National win (new seat) | | | | |
