= Frik van Heerden =

South African politician

Member of the National Assembly
- In office May 1994 – April 1999

Personal details
- Citizenship: South Africa
- Party: National Party

Frederik Jacobus "Frik" van Heerden is a retired South African politician. He represented the National Party (NP) in the apartheid-era House of Assembly from 1987 to 1994 and in the National Assembly from 1994 to 1999.

== Legislative career ==
Van Heerden represented the NP in the all-white House of Assembly from 1987 to 1994. In South Africa's first post-apartheid elections in 1994, he was elected to represent the party in the new National Assembly. He left Parliament in April 1999, shortly before the 1999 general election.

== Lawsuit ==
In 2004, van Heerden sued the government, challenging its policy of contributing more money to the pensions of post-1994 MPs than to the pensions of apartheid-era MPs. Van Heerden purported to bring the suit on behalf of 145 other similarly placed former MPs. Although the Cape High Court agreed with him that the pensions policy was discriminatory and unconstitutional, the Constitutional Court struck down the lower court's ruling on appeal in Minister of Finance v Van Heerden.
