= Stephanus Petrus le Roux =

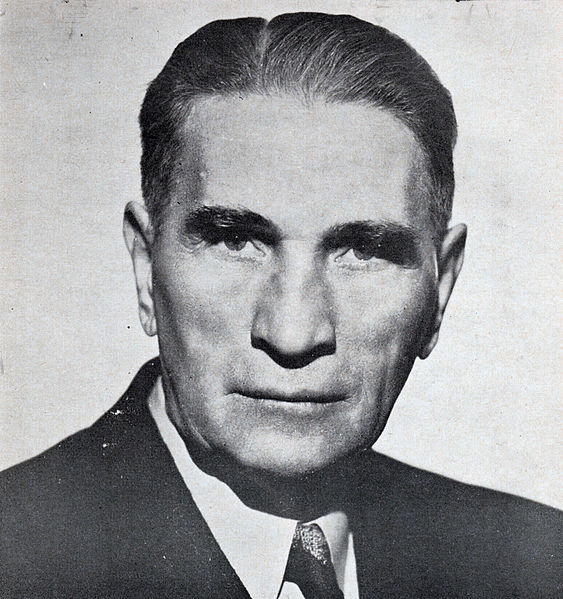
Stephanus Petrus le Roux

Stephanus Petrus le Roux (4 March 1891 – 25 January 1974) was a South African politician. He served as Minister of Agriculture from 1948 until 1958.

His son was the writer Etienne Leroux.
