= Flag of the National Party =

- Proportion: 2:3
- Adopted: 1939
- Relinquished: 29 April 1993
- Design: Blue gunpowder horn outlined in white on an orange background

The Flag of the National Party (Afrikaans: Vlag van die Nasionale Party) was the flag of the ruling National Party, of South Africa during apartheid. The design was a blue hunting horn on an orange background. The flag was created in 1939 and abandoned in 1993.

== History ==
The National Party had no flag for its first twenty-five years. However, following D. F. Malan breaking away from the party to keep the National Party from a merger with the South African Party into the United Party in 1934, it was decided in 1935 they needed a flag with the Junior National Party Conference deciding it must include orange as the party's official colour. The Orange Free State National Party Congress suggested a gunpowder horn on an orange background and it was adopted in 1939. The horn (known as the kruithoring) came from the coat of arms of the Orange Free State and was symbolic of the Boer's Great Trek.

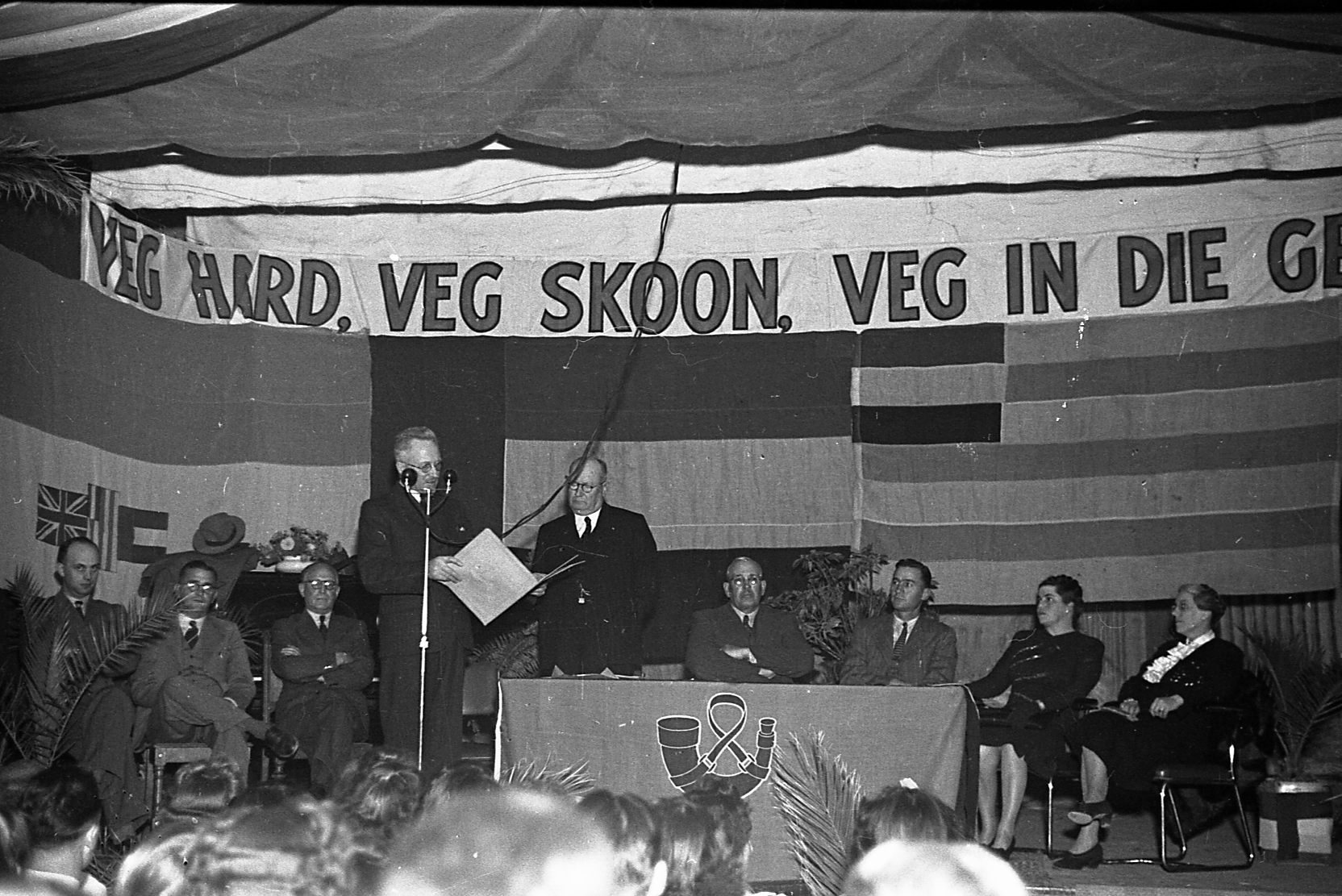
Flag of the National Party (bottom) displayed at an election meeting in Windhoek, South West Africa.

The flag was the main symbol of the party until the 1980s when a new logo was adopted for the 1981 South African general election. The flag was last used by the party during the 1989 South African general election. With the end of apartheid and the National Party opening up membership to non-Afrikaners, a new flag and logo were adopted in 1993. However, the former flag retained popularity amongst hardcore National Party supporters in the run up to the 1994 South African general election. When African National Congress leader Nelson Mandela visited Tafelsig on an election drive, five National Party supporters waved the flag at him. Mandela responded: "What a pity there are those who are raising the flag of the National Party ... They are not sober. They only have the courage to hoist the NP flag because they are not sober."
