= South Africa Act 1909 =

Constitution of the Union of South Africa (1910–1961)

- Act of Parliament
- Parliament of the United Kingdom
- Long title: An Act to constitute the Union of South Africa.
- Citation: 9 Edw. 7. c. 9
- Territorial extent: United Kingdom; Union of South Africa

Dates
- Royal assent: 20 September 1909
- Commencement: 31 May 1910 (Note: Section 5.)
- Repealed: South Africa: 31 May 1961; United Kingdom: 27 May 1976
Other legislation
| Amended by | Status of the Union Act, 1934 |
| Repealed by | South Africa: Republic of South Africa Constitution Act, 1961; United Kingdom: Statute Law (Repeals) Act 1976 |

Status: Repealed

Text of statute as originally enacted

The South Africa Act 1909 (9 Edw. 7. c. 9) was an act of the Parliament of the United Kingdom that created the Union of South Africa out of the former Cape, Natal, Orange River, and Transvaal colonies, and served as the constitution of the Union from 1910 until 1961. The act also allowed for potential admission of Rhodesia into the Union, a proposal rejected by Rhodesian colonists in a 1922 referendum. The draft proposal was supported by the four colonial parliaments, but was opposed by Cape Colony premier W. P. Schreiner, who raised concerns that it would remove rights from non-white South Africans.

The act was the third major piece of legislation passed by the British Parliament to unite various British colonies and provide some degree of autonomy. This had been done through the British North America Act 1867 (30 & 31 Vict. c. 3), which united the Province of Canada (split into Ontario and Quebec) with Nova Scotia and New Brunswick, and the unification of Australia through the Commonwealth of Australia Constitution Act 1900 (63 & 64 Vict. c. 12 (Imp)).

== Background ==
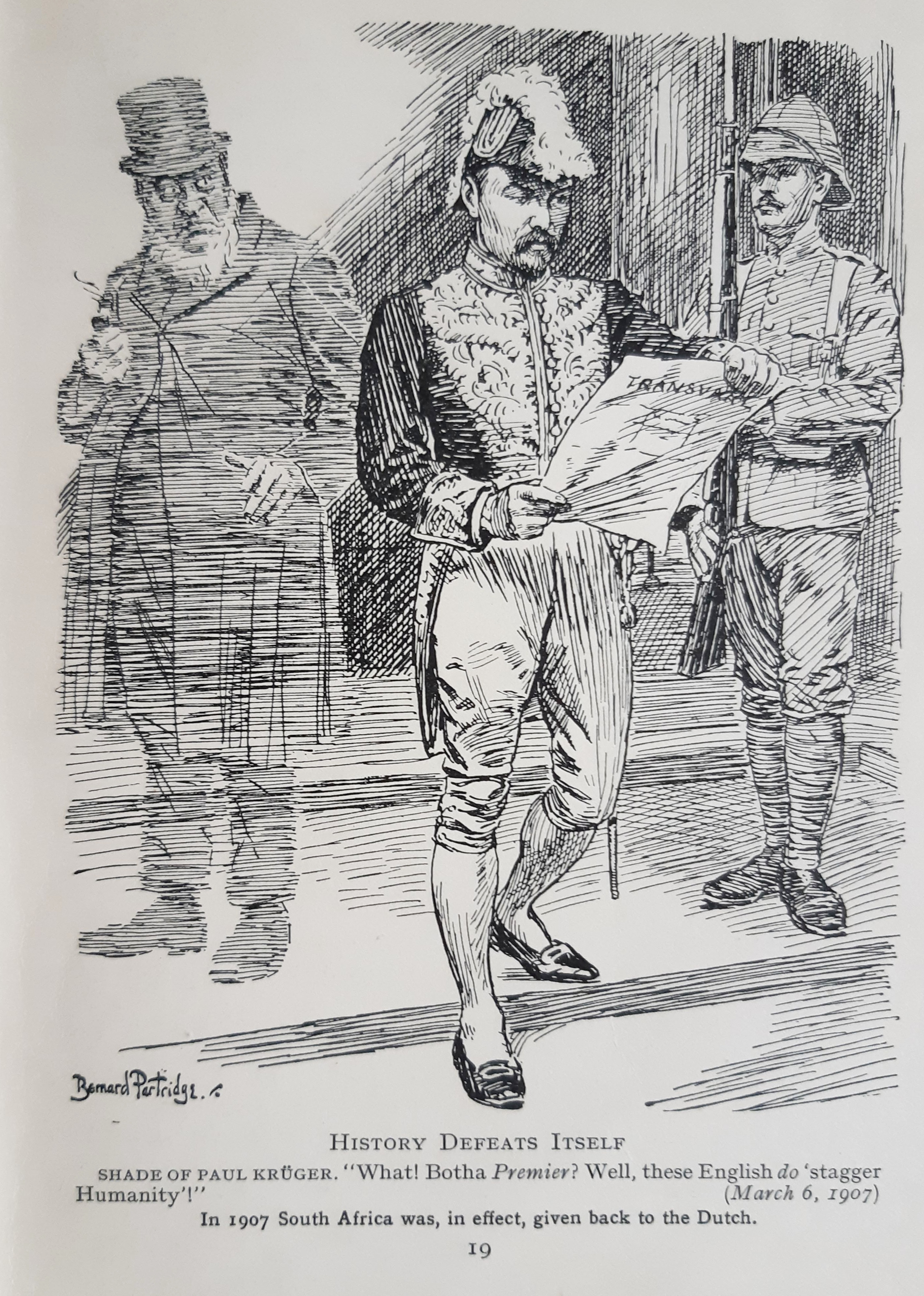
A Punch cartoon expressing surprise at Louis Botha's appointment as the Transvaal Colony Premier. The cartoon states: "SHADE OF PAUL KRUGER. "What! Botha Premier? Well, these English do 'stagger Humanity'!" In 1907 South Africa was, in effect, given back to the Dutch."

After the Anglo-Boer War (1899–1902), Britain re-annexed the South African Republic and the Orange Free State, two hitherto Boer republics. These territories were renamed Transvaal Colony and Orange River Colony respectively and were added to Britain's existing South African territories, which were the Cape Colony and Colony of Natal. British government policy encouraged these colonies to come together in closer union; and the grant of responsible government was given to the Transvaal Colony and Orange River Colony. This aspiration was increasingly shared with the Afrikaner population.

These political forces resulted in the 1908 National Convention, which met on 12 October 1908 and completed its work on 11 May 1909. This convention settled on the terms and constitution of a governmental, legislative, and economic Union. These proposals were transmitted to the British government, which duly prepared a bill to give effect to these wishes. The bill was passed by Parliament on 20 September 1909 and King Edward VII of the United Kingdom proclaimed that the Union of South Africa would be established on 31 May 1910. This act, which essentially brought into being the South African state as it is known today, served as the South African constitution for over fifty years, during which time the Statute of Westminster greatly increased South Africa's sovereignty from Britain. Although South Africa became a republic in 1961 and left the Commonwealth, the basic structure of the 1909 act continued to live on in its replacement, the Republic of South Africa Constitution Act (32 of 1961). However, the last vestiges of the 1909 act finally disappeared in 1983 when the apartheid-era government enacted a new constitution, the Constitution of the Republic of South Africa Act (110 of 1983).

== Provisions ==
=== Government structure ===
The provinces of the Union

The structure of the government of the Union of South Africa was similar to the government of other British Dominions. A Governor-General of South Africa was appointed to represent the British Monarch, who was also the Monarch of South Africa. Executive power was vested in the Monarch/Governor-General and was exercised on the advice of the Executive Council. Though not explicitly provided for by the South Africa Act 1909, the office of Prime Minister of South Africa was quickly established as the head of government and, like other government ministers, the Prime Minister was required to be a Member of either House of Parliament. As in other British Dominions, the Governor-General appointed the leader of the largest political party in the lower house of Parliament as Prime Minister. Prime ministers were also sworn in as Executive Councillors if they were not already members of the Executive Council.

Legislative power was vested in a Parliament consisting of the Monarch, a Senate, and a House of Assembly. For most of the Union's existence, the South Africa Act 1909 provided for each Province to have equal representation in the upper house, the Senate, and Senators were chosen by an electoral college made up of the province's members in the House of Assembly and the members of the provincial legislature. The composition and election of the Senate would later be modified as part of the move towards apartheid and the establishment of the Republic of South Africa. In the lower house of Parliament, the House of Assembly, each Province was represented proportionally according to their respective populations and members were elected from individual districts within a Province. The House of Assembly had more power than the Senate, much like the relationship between the House of Commons and House of Lords. In the case of a disagreement between the Senate and House of Assembly, the Governor-General could convene a joint sitting of the two houses to review the legislation, make amendments, and vote on the bill. Because the House of Assembly was much larger than the Senate, the system was designed to protect the stronger position of the House in any joint sitting. A similar method of resolving disagreements exists in the Australian Parliament and the Indian Parliament, but the Australian Senate and the Rajya Sabha are each half the size of the Australian House of Representatives and the Lok Sabha, respectively, whereas the South African Senate was only one-third the size of the South African House of Assembly. Unlike the Australian model (but like the Indian one), no double dissolution election occurred before a joint sitting, further strengthening the position of the House of Assembly and the Prime Minister over the Senate.

The act also established a Supreme Court of South Africa, which served as a unified court system for the Union and consisted of local, provincial, and appellate divisions. The old supreme courts of the provinces became the provincial divisions of the new Supreme Court of South Africa. The appellate division, which was the highest court in the land, was seated at Bloemfontein. There was a further appeal to the Privy Council, particularly in Admiralty cases. The power judicial review of parliamentary legislation and administrative acts was the same as in the United Kingdom. In addition, the Supreme Court could review parliamentary amendments of the entrenched clauses of the South Africa Act 1909.

Each province was governed by an Administrator, appointed by the central government, and had a legislature in the form of a unicameral Provincial Council; four members of the council joined with the administrator to form a five-member executive committee that acted as the Province's Cabinet. Unlike Canada and Australia, which became dominions through the Federation of British colonies, the South Africa Act created a centralized, unitary state. Each of the four provinces became subordinate entities and had far fewer powers than the Canadian provinces or Australian states. As such, the government of South Africa was quite similar—from a constitutional standpoint—to the government of the United Kingdom.

=== The Cape Qualified Franchise ===
The Cape Colony had long adhered to a system of non-racial franchise, whereby qualifications for suffrage were applied equally to all males, regardless of race. During the union negotiations, the last Cape Prime Minister, John X. Merriman, and Sir Walter Stanford, representing the Transkei and other African communities, fought unsuccessfully to have this multi-racial franchise system extended to the rest of South Africa. Their attempt failed in the face of opposition from the white governments of the other constituent states, which were determined to entrench white rule.

The South Africa Act 1909 permitted the Cape Province to keep a restricted version of its traditional franchise, whereby qualifications limited the suffrage of all citizens according to education and wealth. This meant that the Cape, and to a far lesser degree Natal, having coloureds (mixed-race people) and Black Africans in the voting rolls. The act also permitted the Parliament of South Africa to prescribe all other voting qualifications.

However, according to the act, Parliament was given the power to change the Cape's voting requirements by a two-thirds vote. Over the following years, legislation was passed by Parliament to slowly erode this colour-blind voters roll in the Cape Province.

In 1931, the remaining franchise qualifications, except for the age limit of 21, were removed for white voters, but kept in place for Black and "Coloured" voters (including the demand that voters be male). In 1958, the Apartheid government removed all remaining suffrage rights for "non-whites" in what became known as the Coloured vote constitutional crisis. In compensation, Black and Coloured voters were given a number of separately-elected MPs, which were all removed by the late 1960s.

Ultimately, the act did little to protect black Africans during the time period in which the South Africa Act 1909 was the constitution of South Africa, and ultimately enabled the establishing of fifty years of apartheid and racial discrimination as the Afrikaner National Party gained power.

=== Other provisions ===
The act established English and Dutch as the official languages of South Africa, with equal status under the law, and required all government documents and parliamentary proceedings to be published in both languages. In modern times, English remains one of the official languages of the Republic of South Africa. Dutch was extended to include Afrikaans by the Official Languages of the Union Act, 1925, and replaced by Afrikaans in the Constitution of 1961.

== Subsequent developments ==
The whole act was repealed for the United Kingdom by section 1(1) of, and part XIV of schedule 1 to, the Statute Law (Repeals) Act 1976, which came into force on 27 May 1976.

== Bibliography ==
- Brand, Robert Henry (1909). The Union of South Africa. Oxford: The Clarendon Press. OCLC 4158157. OL 7082620M.
- Muller, C. F. J., ed. (1984). Five hundred years: a history of South Africa (4th ed.). Pretoria: Academica Press. ISBN 978-0-86874-199-4.
- Themaat, Joan Philip Verloren van (1981). Staatsreg (in Afrikaans). Durban: Butterworth. ISBN 978-0-409-06352-3.
- Hahlo, H. R.; Kahn, Ellison (1960). The Union of South Africa: The Development of Its Laws and Constitution. Cape Town: Stevens & Sons. OCLC 559572761.
