= Provincial council (South Africa) =

Old South African provincial legislature

Provincial Council of South Africa

Type
- Type: Unicameral

History
- Founded: 1910
- Disbanded: 1986

The provincial councils were the legislatures of the four original provinces of South Africa. They were created at the foundation of the Union of South Africa in 1910, and abolished in 1986 when they were replaced by a strengthened executive appointed by the State President. The four provincial councils were the Cape Provincial Council, the Natal Provincial Council, the Transvaal Provincial Council and the Orange Free State Provincial Council.

== History ==
The Union of South Africa was created in 1910 in terms of the South Africa Act 1909. Four British colonies – Cape Colony, Transvaal Colony, Natal Colony and Orange River Colony – became provinces of the new country, and the colonies' parliaments were abolished and most of their powers transferred to the new Parliament of the Union. The provincial councils were created to legislate on those matters which the South Africa Act allocated to the provinces.

When South Africa became a republic in 1961, the Constitution of 1961 preserved the provincial councils unchanged, except that the powers previously vested in the Governor-General now vested in the State President. In 1973 the law relating to the delimitation of electoral divisions and the dissolution of provincial councils was altered by the Constitution and Elections Amendment Act, 1973, as described below.

The Constitution of 1983, which created the Tricameral Parliament, preserved those sections of the 1961 constitution dealing with the provincial councils under the name of the Provincial Government Act, 1961. The State President was given the power to remove matters from the jurisdiction of the provincial councils and instead place them under the jurisdiction of the individual racially segregated Houses of Parliament as "own affairs". The provincial councils were entirely abolished by the Provincial Government Act, 1986, which provided for an executive council for each province to be appointed by the State President. The legislative powers of each provincial council were transferred to the Administrator of the province, subject to the approval of Parliament.

In 1994, on the commencement of the Interim Constitution, the four original provinces were dissolved to be replaced by the nine provinces now existing. Each new province has a provincial legislature which has considerably broader legislative powers than the old provincial councils, and is elected by all citizens of the province regardless of race.

== Election ==
The provincial council was composed of members elected by first-past-the-post voting in single-member electoral divisions. In provinces which elected at least 25 members to the national House of Assembly (i.e. the Cape and Transvaal), the number of provincial councillors was the same as the number of Assembly members, and the same electoral districts were used for both. In provinces with less than 25 Assembly seats (i.e. Natal and the Orange Free State), there were 25 provincial councillors and separate districts were delimited for their election.

This formula was altered by the Constitution and Elections Amendment Act, 1973, so that provinces electing 20 or more Assembly members would have corresponding Assembly and provincial council divisions, while provinces with fewer than 20 Assembly seats would have two provincial council divisions for each Assembly division. The result was that Natal, with exactly 20 Assembly seats, saw its provincial council shrink from 25 to 20 members; while the Orange Free State, with 14 Assembly seats, saw its provincial council grow from 25 to 28 members.

The qualifications required to vote in provincial council elections were initially the same as those that had applied to elections in the four colonies. This meant that the franchise in the Transvaal and the Orange Free State was restricted by law to white men, and in Natal the franchise was effectively limited to white men. Only in the Cape were there significant numbers of non-white voters, although they were limited by property and education qualifications.

In 1930 all white women were given the right to vote, and in 1931 all remaining property and education qualifications were removed for white men. In 1936, under the Representation of Natives Act, black voters in the Cape Province were removed from the common voters' roll and instead allowed to separately elect two members of the provincial council. In 1956, under the Separate Representation of Voters Act, coloured voters in the Cape were similarly removed from the common roll and allowed to separately elect two members. The members representing black voters were removed in 1959 and those representing coloured voters were removed in 1968.

Originally the term of the provincial council was five years, from the first meeting of the council after it was elected. The administrator of the province fixed the date for the meeting, but the provincial council had to meet at least once a year. The South African Parliament could alter the term by legislation (as it did when the provincial elections due in 1941 were postponed until 1943), but there was no general power to dissolve a provincial council before its statutory term expired.

Under the Constitution and Elections Amendment Act, 1973, the State President was given the power to dissolve the provincial councils at the same time as the House of Assembly, so that the subsequent provincial election could take place on the same day as a parliamentary general election.

== Powers ==
The provincial councils had the power to make laws, known as "ordinances", dealing with certain topics listed in the South Africa Act 1909 and in the Constitution Act that replaced it when South Africa became a republic. These topics were:

- Education, except for higher education; the education of black people was removed from provincial responsibility in 1953, as was the education of coloured and Indian people in 1963 and 1965 respectively.
- Agriculture
- Hospitals and charities
- Local government and, from 1926, local public health
- Local infrastructure, except for railways and harbours
- Roads
- Markets and pounds
- Fish and game preservation
- Taxation for provincial purposes and the borrowing of money for provincial purposes
- The punishment of violations of provincial ordinances
- Other matters which the national executive determined were of a purely local nature, or in which Parliament delegated legislative power to the provincial councils.

The provincial councils were always subordinate to Parliament, which could overrule provincial ordinances. Further, while acts of Parliament could not be questioned by the courts, provincial ordinances were subject to judicial review to determine whether they were ultra vires.

== Executive committee ==
The provincial executive committee consisted of an Administrator appointed by the national executive and four members elected by the provincial council. These members were elected by single transferable vote, so were not necessarily all from the same party. The executive committee was responsible for the administration of provincial affairs.

Executive powers were shared by the administrator and an executive committee. This arrangement was neither the traditional Westminster system (such as that which existed at the national level of government) or a United States style separation of powers between the executive and legislative parts of the government.

The Administrator, who was appointed by the national government for a five-year term, was the official in whose name all provincial executive acts were carried out. He was not responsible to the provincial council and it had no power to remove him from office; he could only be removed by the national government. The administrator was the chairman of the provincial executive committee and had both an original and casting vote in its deliberations.

== See also ==
- Parliament of South Africa
- South Africa Act 1909
- South African Constitution of 1961
- Provincial legislature (South Africa)
