= Colin Fraser Steyn =

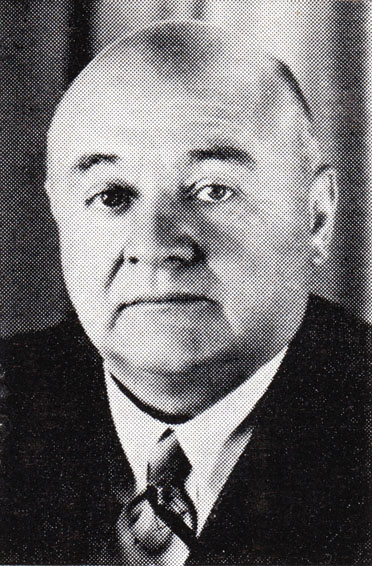

South African Minister for Justice
- In office 1939–1945
- Prime Minister: Jan Smuts
- Preceded by: Jan Smuts
- Succeeded by: Harry Gordon Lawrence

Personal details
- Born: 27 November 1887 Bloemfontein, Orange Free State
- Died: 23 April 1959 (aged 71)
- Party: United Party; National Party
- Children: Theunie Steyn
- Profession: Lawyer, Politician

Colin Fraser Steyn (27 November 1887 – 23 April 1959) was a lawyer and a politician in South Africa. He served as a member in the House of Assembly, senator, and cabinet minister in the government of Jan Smuts.

== Early life ==
He was born on 27 November 1887 in Bloemfontein in the Orange Free State, the son of Marthinus Theunis Steyn, who was the President of the Orange Free State from 1896 till 1902. He was named for his grandfather on his mother's side, Reverend Colin Fraser.

He attended Greys College, but his studies were interrupted by the Second Boer War when he accompanied his father to the Natal battle fronts. After the war, he attended school in Switzerland during his parents' tour to Europe. On his return to Bloemfontein, he resumed his schooling and attended Grey University College. He left for Leiden University in 1907 and returned to South Africa in 1912, with a doctorate in law. He practiced as a lawyer in Pretoria and then in Bloemfontein. Steyn went on to marry Rae Eksteen in 1919 and had two sons.

== Career and later life ==
He joined the National Party and after the 1915 South African general election, represented the seat of Vredefort. He was elected as deputy leader of the National Party. He served in the capacity as Deputy Minister of Justice from 1915 to 1928, under Tielman Roos.

He resigned from his position as Deputy Minister of Justice in 1928, and left the political life for a short period, before joining United Party in 1936 and was once again re-elected to the Parliament of South Africa in 1938.

He was appointed as the Minister of Justice from 1939 till 1945, and then served as Minister of Employment from 1946 till 1948, in the United Party government of Prime Minister Jan Smuts.

In 1953, he left the House of Assembly for the senate, where he was served as senator for the United Party in Natal until 1956. He resigned from parliament in 1955, due to health problems.

Steyn died on 23 April 1959.
