= Purified National Party =

1934–1940 South African political party

Purified National Party Gesuiwerde Nasionale Party
- Abbreviation: GNP
- Leader: D. F. Malan
- Founded: 1934; 92 years ago
- Dissolved: 1940; 86 years ago
- Split from: National Party
- Merged into: Reunited National Party
- Youth wing: Nasionale Jeugbond
- Ideology: Afrikaner nationalism; Conservatism; Republicanism; Antisemitism; Non-interventionism
- Political position: Right-wing
- Colours: Orange , white , and blue (South African national colours)
- House of Assembly (1938): 27 / 150
- Senate (1939): 6 / 44

Party flag

The Purified National Party (Afrikaans: Gesuiwerde Nasionale Party, GNP) was an Afrikaner nationalist political party in South Africa. It was founded in 1934 as a splinter group opposed to the merging of the National Party (NP) into the United Party (UP) led by future prime minister D. F. Malan, then merged with a UP faction led by former prime minister J. B. M. Hertzog to form the Reunited National Party (Herenigde Nasionale Party, HNP) in 1940.

After the NP and South African Party (SAP) signed agreements to form the UP in late June, Malan established the GNP from NP dissident elements. 19 National MPs switched parties during July and August, making the party the official opposition to the UP. At the 1938 general election – the only federal election the GNP contested – the party received 31.3% of the popular vote and gained 8 seats, but remained in distant opposition to a UP supermajority. After Hertzog resigned as prime minister and his UP faction split in opposition to South Africa's support for the Allies during World War II, the GNP and Hertzog's faction formed the HNP. While Hertzog was initially dominant and led the new party in opposition, he was soon overtaken by Malan's faction; Malan was elected prime minister in 1948 and the HNP retook the National Party name in 1951.

Generally described as right-wing, the GNP sought to reduce Afrikaner confidence in the UP merger, opposing efforts to promote a common identity between them and British South Africans. It also criticised South Africa's status as a British dominion, openly supporting republicanism by 1936 and calling for the adoption of "Die Stem van Suid-Afrika" (which became co-official with "God Save the King" in 1938) as the sole national anthem. The party supported antisemitism in South Africa and racial segregation, criticising the UP for failing to ban miscegenation and attempting to portray its government as racially liberal. In foreign policy, the GNP supported neutrality and expressed concern that the UP could insert South Africa into a European war.

== History ==
=== NP–SAP merger and founding (1933–1934) ===
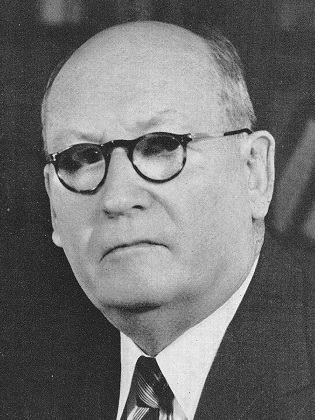
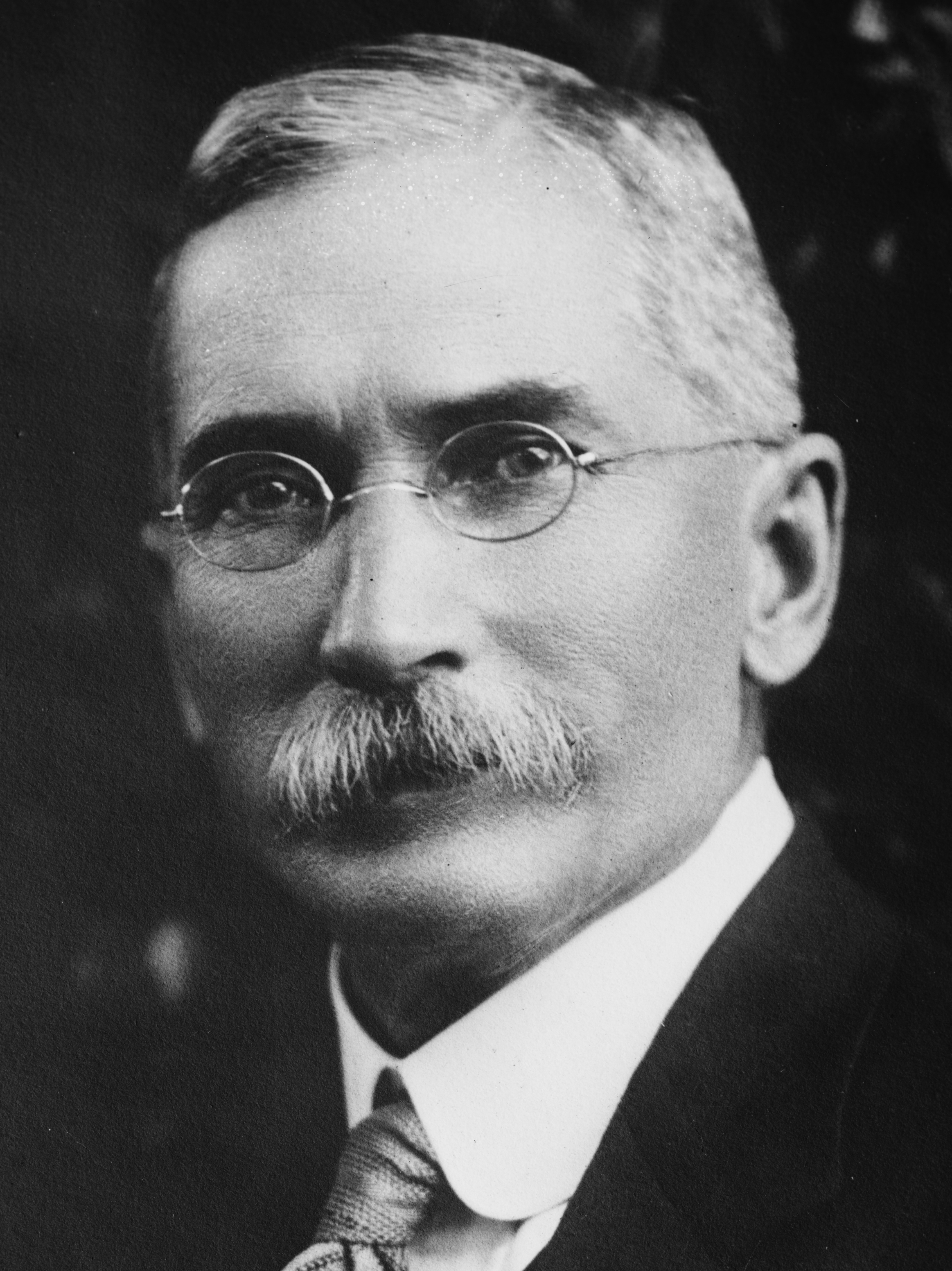
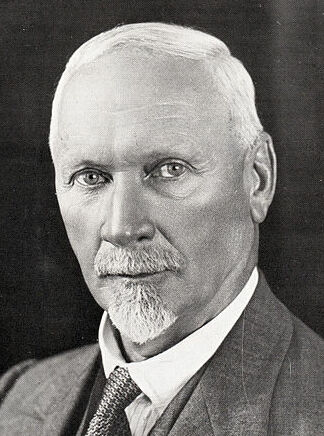
D. F. Malan (left) led the breakaway faction that became the GNP, opposed to the merging of the National and South African parties under leaders J. B. M. Hertzog (middle) and Jan Smuts (right).

In the lead-up to the 1933 general election and amid the Great Depression in South Africa, NP prime minister Hertzog formed a broad coalition with the SAP led by former and future prime minister Jan Smuts on 31 March. After the coalition's success in depression recovery, a public movement to formally merge the NP and SAP emerged, while some local party chapters began to work as a single entity, particularly in the Orange Free State and Transvaal.

While Hertzog officially began supporting uniting the parties in August 1933 – believing he had convinced both Smuts's faction and Malan's hardline Afrikaner nationalist faction of its benefits – the Cape Province NP branch struck down a resolution supporting a merger 142–38 on 5 October and Malan stated that the Cape branch was prepared to operate independently if a merger went through. Malan negotiated with Hertzog at Groote Schuur, an official residence of the prime minister, on 2 and 4 February 1934: Hertzog met Malan's demands by promising to advise the monarch to appoint an Afrikaner governor-general if the office became vacant during his premiership, promising to abolish criminal appeals to the Privy Council once pending appeals were resolved, and allowing members of the new party be allowed to propagandise for republicanism, which led Malan to declare that the Cape branch supported the merger in theory.

On 16 February, a letter exchange between Cape NP secretary Frans Erasmus and Hertzog detailing several concessions made was published to the press, which Hertzog and Malan further used to promote unity. Alongside the previous concessions made to Malan, Hertzog stated that he supported South Africa's right to abandon its status as a British dominion and to remain neutral in British wars, although he refused to include such a statement in the party manifesto, stating that it "would confuse rather than clarify and might suggest doubts as to the Union's true constitutional position". These concessions agitated the SAP – which the NP was still in negotiations with – and created a public perception that the letter was a manifesto for a merged party.

Smuts rejected Hertzog's views on the monarchy in an 18 February letter, stating that the party must support the status quo, although he conceded that an alliance between Afrikaner nationalists and British South Africans would be impossible if a united position was required on the Crown. Hertzog also replied that he agreed with Smuts's reply, which angered Malan's faction, who believed the reply showed Hertzog's multiplicity. Malan stated on 22 February that "the events of the last few days have definitely killed fusion", and his faction became uncompromising in its opposition, highlighting irreconcilable disagreements between the SAP and Malan's faction.

By 23 April, Hertzog and the SAP had agreed on draft terms of a merger, which included the principles the initial coalition was built on alongside an agreement for a potential separate legislature representing native Africans. On the Crown, the agreement provided for the status quo but stated support for a "South Africa first" policy, not entering obligations which would hurt the country. The NP Federal Council and SAP Union Head Committee separately considered the agreement on 30 June; while the SAP easily agreed, overcoming opposition from a faction led by Charles Stallard, the NP debate lasted into the morning of 31 June due to opposition from Malan's faction. After the NP ultimately decided in favour of the merger 13–7, Malan read a statement to the Federal Council:

The Head Committee has instructed the representatives of the Cape Province that, in case matters developed as they have now done, they should inform the Federal Council that it had been decided to recommend to the next Congress of the Nationalist Party in the Cape that the accepted basis be rejected and that the Nationalist Party shall continue to exist.

Malan's faction wrote a statement condemning the merger, criticising its status quo position on the Crown, economic views, and calling for South African neutrality and a "people's party" not controlled by a political machine. Malan reorganised the remaining dissident elements of the NP into the GNP, and 19 of the 75 National MPs (14 from the Cape Province, four from the Orange Free State, and one from the Transvaal) switched to the GNP from July to August 1934 alongside several provincial council members; the Federal Council met in Bloemfontein to establish a manifesto on 5 July. Stallard's SAP faction also broke away, forming the Dominion Party with 3 other MPs in August. The SAP and NP officially merged into the UP on 5 December, while the GNP formally became the official opposition when the House of Assembly convened in January 1935.

=== 1935–1938 ===
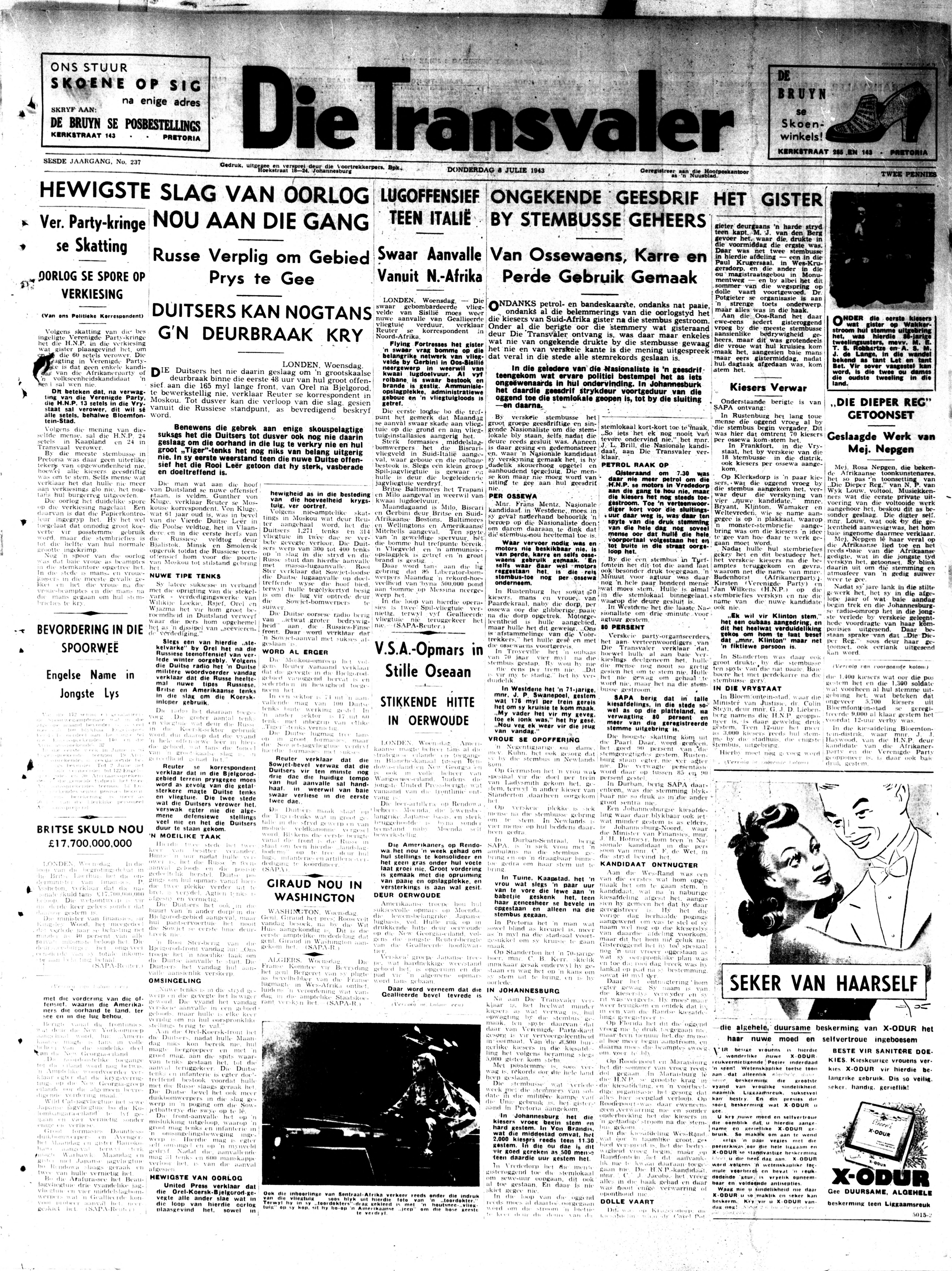
The GNP established Die Transvaler (1943 issue pictured) in October 1937, seeking to expand its influence in the Transvaal.

The new party's strongest base was in the Cape Province, where Malan salvaged large amounts of NP dissident elements, partially due to Erasmus's loyalty to the provincial organisation over the federal party. The party was backed by Cape Town newspaper Die Burger (which Malan had previously been editor-in-chief for) and its Die Nasionale Pers ('The National Press') publishing house. While the Orange Free State – which Hertzog came from – mostly supported the merger, the GNP held a stronger position due to a competent, albeit young, minority who opposed the merger. The party was supported by Die Volksblad (a Nasionale Pers affiliate) and popular MP N.J. van der Merwe, although the UP remained dominant in the province.

In the Natal and Transvaal provinces, the GNP was decimated as almost all of the local NP supported the merger; American academic Newell Stultz remarked that "for many years the GNP existed in Natal in name only" and "the position in the Transvaal seemed initially as bad". Nationally the party was supported by many Afrikaner cultural and intellectual groups who believed the goals of the Afrikaner movement had not been achieved under Hertzog, as well as by Afrikaner farmers and workers.

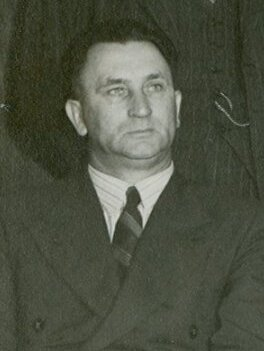
The GNP in the Transvaal was mostly financed by future prime minister J. G. Strijdom, the party's only MP in that province.

Attempting to grow a presence in the Transvaal beginning in 1936, the GNP established Die Transvaler, a daily newspaper in Johannesburg, in October 1937. The Transvaal party was heavily financed by future prime minister J. G. Strijdom, the Transvaal's only GNP MP, who also emerged as a de facto leader of the provincial party despite being a mostly unknown backbencher before the UP merger. Despite Strijdom's contributions the party remained limited on money in the province, being unable to pay full-time employees.

Ahead of the 1938 general election on May 18, the only federal election the GNP would contest, the GNP were predicted to remain in opposition, citing weak performances at previous provincial elections. On election day, the party received 259,543 (31.31%) of the popular vote and gained 8 seats for a total of 27 out of 150, but remained in distant opposition to a UP which won 111 seats, having failed to break through outside of rural and poorer areas of the Cape and Orange Free State. The GNP performed particularly poorly in the Transvaal, where it only received 75,000 votes to the UP's 185,000 and attempts to attract urban working men failed, in some cases resulting in groups becoming closer with the UP.

The GNP established a youth wing, the Nasionale Jeugbond ('National Youth League'), in 1938. The next year, a party flag was established following a 1935 Orange Free State GNP meeting, seeking to strengthen the party's identity and promote unity among its members. Depicting a blue gunpowder horn with a white border against an orange background, the flag was used by the GNP and its successors until 1993. After the flag's establishment, the party's colours – which were previously only orange – were updated to orange, white, and blue, the South African national colours.

==== Ties with the Afrikaner Broederbond ====
There is no doubt that the secret Broederbond is nothing else but a purified Nationalist Party busy underground, and the Purified Nationalist Party is nothing but a secret Afrikaner Broederbond continuing its activities above ground.

— Hertzog on the connections between the GNP and Broederbond, 1935

The Afrikaner Broederbond ('Afrikaner Brotherhood') was a secret society of Afrikaners with around 2,500 members who sought to promote their interests and ensure Afrikaner dominance in South Africa. They exercised influence through controlling Afrikaner-dominated institutions, mainly churches and schools, and creating new institutions where no explicitly Afrikaner ones had previously existed. While Broederbond secretary I.M. Lombard denied that the organisation was involved in party politics, it was apparent that the Broederbond was linked to the GNP and later the HNP through their common goals. Erasmus, Malan, Strijdom, and several other prominent GNP members were likely members of the Broederbond; The Rand Daily Mail alleged that 60 of the 92 GNP candidates in the 1938 general election were also members. Despite their ties the Broederbond and GNP did not exert control over each other, as they were considered separate like-minded organisations in different areas.

=== Hertzog split and merge into the HNP (1939–1940) ===
Following the Nazi invasion of Poland, the United Kingdom and France declared war against Nazi Germany on 3 September 1939, beginning World War II. This reignited the issue of neutrality in British wars, and a tense cabinet meeting occurred at Groote Schuur the day before the declarations of war, where Hertzog and five other ministers supported continued neutrality but seven, including Smuts, supported immediate entry into the war against Germany. This was a break from the previous position of Smuts, who a year earlier had endorsed a statement by Hertzog supporting neutrality. While some Hertzog supporters criticised Smuts for failing to notify him of a position change, biographer Keith Hancock responded that Smuts had made at least 20 publicised speeches on his changing position between the statement and the war.

The House of Assembly voted on a resolution compelling the government to sever Nazi ties and abandon neutrality on 4 September; after it passed 80–67 and governor-general Patrick Duncan refused Hertzog's request to hold a snap election, the prime minister resigned on 5 September and Smuts began a second non-consecutive term to replace him the next day. The UP now led by Smuts formed a coalition with the Dominion and Labour parties. While four MPs who had been National members before the merger supported Smuts's ascension to the premiership and his cabinet contained six Afrikaners, most Afrikaners abandoned the UP after the split, triggering a major political realignment which brought South Africa closer to its pre-merger party system.

However we may regret what has occurred, there is no doubt that few other things could so quickly or effectively have consolidated Afrikaans-speaking Afrikanerdom.

— Hertzog after the UP split

At the indirect election for the Senate of South Africa held on 17 November, the GNP won six seats, while the UP won 13, Hertzog's faction won nine, and Dominion and Labour both won two. As some seats were appointed by the governor-general, the governing coalition ultimately had 24 seats while Hertzog's faction gained one seat. After the Hertzog–Smuts union ended, the former remained divided with the GNP on the outcome of the merger; while Hertzog believed union was a good idea which only failed due to the changing position of Smuts, the GNP argued that the split proved Hertzog made a mistake in agreeing to it and expected a confession to that extent. While Hertzog maintained his stance, conciliation between Afrikaners and British South Africans lost appeal to the former group.

On 27 January 1940 a merger agreement between the GNP and Hertzog's faction was published, forming the HNP. While the agreement provided for "best use" of both party manifestos until a unified one was created, it included an explicit statement supporting republicanism after a referendum but called for equality between Afrikaners and British South Africans and stated "Membership of the party will not be denied or refused to any national-minded Afrikaner who is prepared to subject himself to the party obligations, but who is not convinced of the desirability of establishing a republic in the existing circumstances". These clauses were added as a concession to Hertzog, who became parliamentary leader of the HNP.

Hertzog retired from politics after the Orange Free State HNP voted on two competing proposals for a provincial manifesto on 6 November, one proposed by him and the other by the party Federal Council. The Federal Council proposal was more republican than Hertzog's and did not make a statement ensuring equality between Afrikaners and British South Africans. After his version was overwhelmingly rejected, he abruptly announced his resignation from Free State HNP leadership and left the meeting, resigning as an MP alongside Nicolaas Havenga on 12 December. While a pro-Hertzog faction led by E. A. Conroy split into the Afrikaner Party (AP) in early 1941, Hertzog had retired from politics at that point and his movement lost influence without its leader; only ten of the 38 UP MPs who supported Hertzog during the World War II vote joined Conroy's party, all of which were backbenchers.

The HNP won a plurality of 70 seats at the 1948 general election despite losing the popular vote to the UP, while the AP, which had formed an electoral pact with the HNP against the UP, won nine, allowing a majority government to be formed. The AP and HNP merged into a new party which retook the original National Party name in 1951.

== Structure ==
Like the party it split from, the GNP was a federation of provincial bodies, all of which had separate constitutions and considerable autonomy, deciding the party's provincial-level policies separately. Provincial councils were composed of delegates from subdivision committees or local branches in the Transvaal. While the Federal Council – with equal representation from each province – was charged with inter-provincial communication and press relations, coordinating power was also exerted by the party's parliamentary caucus.

== Political positions ==
An Afrikaner nationalist party generally described as right-wing, the GNP sought to fight UP attempts to promote a common identity between Afrikaners and English-speaking South Africans. It attempted to undermine Afrikaner confidence in the UP merger, thus reducing sympathies to the English-speaking population, and argued that the merger contradicted NP principles including republicanism and the protection and economic growth of Afrikaners. By 1936, the GNP openly supported republicanism conditional on a successful referendum; while this position likely lost the party support from Afrikaners who supported independence but opposed fully abolishing the monarchy, it gave the party a clear differing policy from the UP which Stultz said "could guarantee political survival, if not electoral success".

With the political centre occupied by the UP, the GNP pursued more radical policies, including antisemitism, in response to growing Jewish immigration, Afrikaner irritation with Jews, and similar movements in Europe. The GNP began calling for a halt to Jewish immigration in 1936 and its Transvaal branch banned Jewish members the next year. At the 1938 election, the GNP formed electoral pacts in some constituencies with the South African Gentile National Socialist Movement ('Greyshirts'), an antisemitic political movement.

As these radical positions lost appeal during post-depression prosperity, the GNP shifted towards scepticism of South Africa's independence from the British Empire; alongside repeated calls to abolish appeal to the Privy Council, the party criticised the dual status of South African nationals as British subjects and advocated for the adoption of "Die Stem van Suid-Afrika" (which became co-official with "God Save the King" in 1938) as the sole national anthem. It also repeatedly opposed the UP's divided position on dominion status and South Africa's right to remain neutral: while Hertzog supported these beliefs, Stultz wrote that the GNP believed Hertzog was "a captive of a party that did not entirely share [his] views" and his party's policies would make it hard to practise these rights. The party further expressed concern that the UP could enter South Africa into a European war.

Racially, the GNP supported racial segregation, removing native African representation from the House of Assembly and creating a separate parliament for coloureds, and opposed whites being employed by non-whites. During the 1938 election, the party attempted to portray the incumbent government as controlled by minister Jan Hendrik Hofmeyr, who was known for his liberal racial views, while criticising the UP's refusal to ban miscegenation and creating the baster plakkaat ('bastard poster'), depicting a white woman and black man in front of a slum house with their coloured children playing in the dirt. The UP responded that the poster disparaged all white South African women, leading to women's protests at some GNP election offices; while some candidates withdrew the poster, others stood by it as the manifestation of UP policies.

== Election results ==
Purified National Party electoral history
Election	Party leader	Votes	%	Seats	+/–	Position	Result
1938 general	D. F. Malan	259,543	31.31%	27 / 150	▲8 (Note: Change from the 19 NP defectors when the GNP was founded)	2nd	Opposition
1939 Senate	D. F. Malan	—N/a		6 / 44	?	3rd	Opposition
