= Kroonstad (House of Assembly of South Africa constituency) =

- Former constituency for the South African House of Assembly
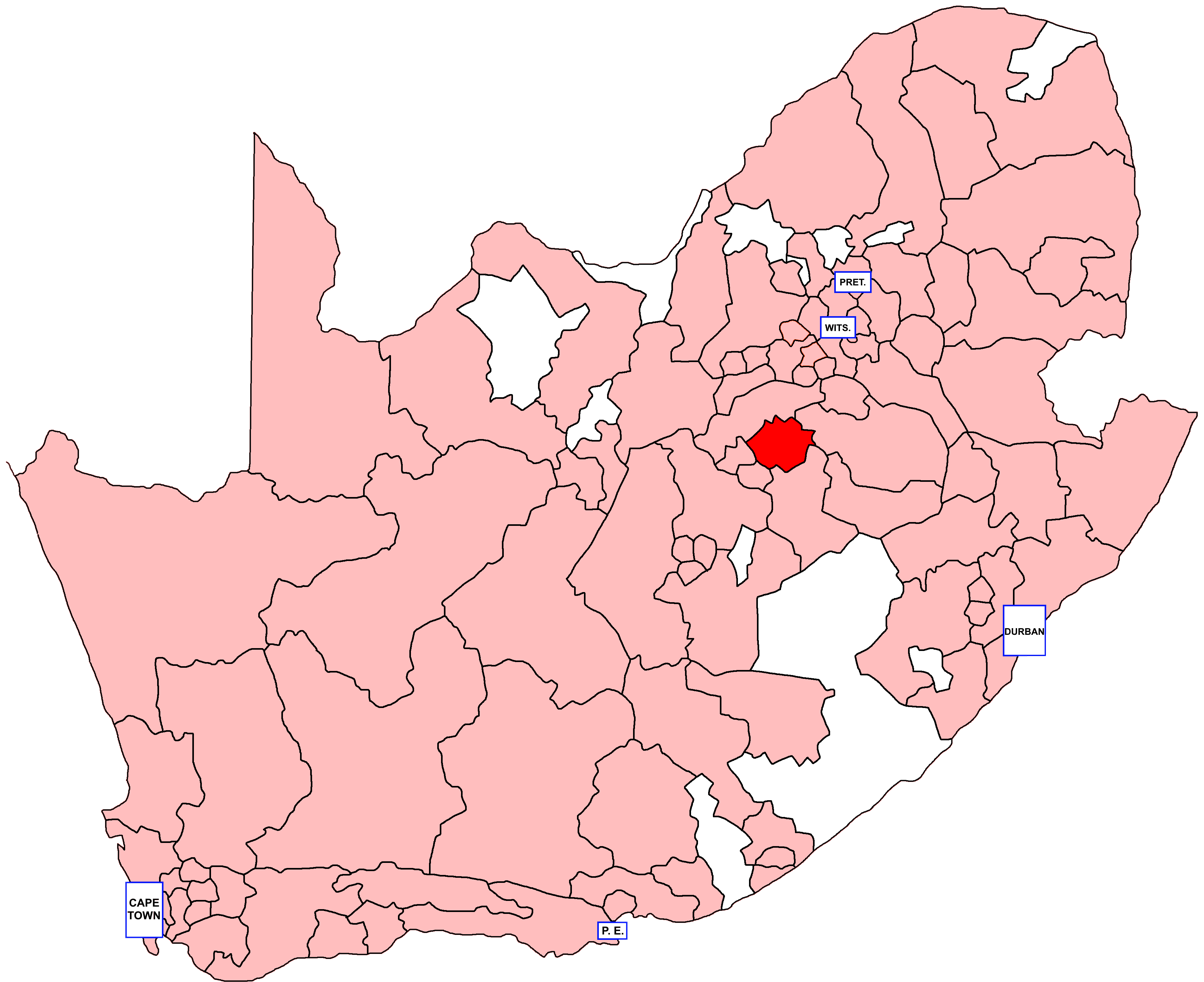
- Location of Kroonstad within South Africa (1981)
- Province: Orange Free State
- Electorate: 15,984 (1989)

Former constituency
- Created: 1910
- Abolished: 1994
- Number of members: 1
- Last MHA: Wynand Breytenbach (NP)
- Replaced by: Free State

Kroonstad was a constituency in the Orange Free State Province of South Africa, which existed from 1910 to 1994. Named after the town of Kroonstad, the seat covered a rural area in the east of the province. Throughout its existence it elected one member to the House of Assembly.

== Franchise notes ==
When the Union of South Africa was formed in 1910, the electoral qualifications in use in each pre-existing colony were kept in place. In the Orange River Colony, and its predecessor the Orange Free State, the vote was restricted to white men, and as such, elections in the Orange Free State Province were held on a whites-only franchise from the beginning. The franchise was also restricted by property and education qualifications until the 1933 general election, following the passage of the Women's Enfranchisement Act, 1930 and the Franchise Laws Amendment Act, 1931. From then on, the franchise was given to all white citizens aged 21 or over. Non-whites remained disenfranchised until the end of apartheid and the introduction of universal suffrage in 1994.

== History ==
Kroonstad, like most of the Orange Free State, was a highly conservative seat throughout its existence and had a largely Afrikaans-speaking electorate. It was an early stronghold for the National Party, whose founding leader J. B. M. Hertzog enjoyed widespread popularity with the Free State's Afrikaner population. Its Nationalist MP, Pieter Johannes Terreblanche, left parliament in January 1934, as Hertzog was in the process of merging his party with Jan Smuts' South African Party to form the new United Party. In the resulting by-election, the coalition parties agreed to nominate the SAP's George James Fullard, who was duly elected with only independent opposition. Fullard would represent three separate parties over a fairly short parliamentary career: he joined the UP on its formation shortly after he was elected, held the seat in 1938, then joined Nicolaas Havenga's Afrikaner Party in 1940. He contested the seat under that label in 1943, but like most Afrikaner Party candidates, placed a distant third, and the seat was taken by Andries Steyn for the Herenigde Nasionale Party, which swept the Free State in that election.

Kroonstad continued to be a Nationalist safe seat throughout the remainder of its existence, electing two relatively prominent MPs in its later years. Alwyn Schlebusch, first elected in 1962, left the seat in 1981 in order to take up the position of Vice State President, which only existed for three years and was only ever held by him. His replacement, Wynand Breytenbach, served as a deputy minister under P. W. Botha and F. W. de Klerk, and defended the seat from strong Conservative Party challenges in 1987 and 1989. He was elected to the non-racial National Assembly for the NP in 1994, but resigned shortly afterwards.

== Members ==
Election	Member	Party
1910	D. J. Serfontein	Orangia Unie
1915	H. P. Serfontein	National
1920	A. J. Werth	National
1921	A. J. Werth	National
1924	A. J. Werth	National
1926 by	P. J. Terreblanche	National
1929	P. J. Terreblanche	National
1933	P. J. Terreblanche	National
1934 by	G. J. Fullard	South African
1934	G. J. Fullard	United
1938	G. J. Fullard	United
1940	G. J. Fullard	Afrikaner
1943	Andries Steyn	HNP
1948	Andries Steyn	HNP
1953	Andries Steyn	National
1955 by	J. A. van der Merwe	National
1958	J. A. van der Merwe	National
1961	J. A. van der Merwe	National
1962 by	Alwyn Schlebusch	National
1966	Alwyn Schlebusch	National
1970	Alwyn Schlebusch	National
1974	Alwyn Schlebusch	National
1977	Alwyn Schlebusch	National
1981	Wynand Breytenbach	National
1987	Wynand Breytenbach	National
1989	Wynand Breytenbach	National
1994	constituency abolished	

== Detailed results ==
=== Elections in the 1910s ===
General election 1910: Kroonstad
Party	Candidate	Votes	%	±%
Orangia Unie	D. J. Serfontein	713	59.3	New
Independent	N. Blignaut	489	40.7	New
Majority		224	18.6	N/A
Orangia Unie win (new seat)				

General election 1915: Kroonstad
Party	Candidate	Votes	%	±%
National	H. P. Serfontein	942	53.2	New
South African	N. J. de Wet	828	46.8	−12.5
Majority		114	6.4	N/A
Turnout		1,770	76.2	N/A
National gain from South African		Swing	N/A	

=== Elections in the 1920s ===
General election 1920: Kroonstad
Party	Candidate	Votes	%	±%
National	A. J. Werth	1,379	62.0	+8.8
South African	Hendrik Schalk Theron	846	38.0	−8.8
Majority		533	24.0	+17.6
Turnout		2,225	76.4	+0.2
National hold		Swing	+8.8	

General election 1921: Kroonstad
Party	Candidate	Votes	%	±%
National	A. J. Werth	1,383	62.0	+−0
South African	H. G. Stuart	849	38.0	+−0
Majority		534	24.0	+−0
Turnout		2,232	73.2	−3.2
National hold		Swing	+-0	

General election 1924: Kroonstad
Party	Candidate	Votes	%	±%
National	A. J. Werth	1,429	63.7	+1.7
South African	H. P. Meyer	795	35.4	−2.6
Rejected ballots		16	0.9	N/A
Majority		634	28.3	+4.3
Turnout		2,240	78.0	+4.8
National hold		Swing	+2.2	

Kroonstad by-election, 18 June 1926
Party	Candidate	Votes	%	±%
National	P. J. Terreblanche	1,424	63.0	−0.7
South African	P. D. de Wet	813	36.0	+0.6
Rejected ballots		24	1.0	+0.1
Majority		611	27.0	−1.3
Turnout		2,261	77.5	−0.5
National hold		Swing	-0.7	

General election 1929: Kroonstad
Party	Candidate	Votes	%	±%
National	P. J. Terreblanche	1,532	69.2	+5.5
South African	H. P. Meyer	635	28.7	−6.7
Rejected ballots		46	2.1	+1.2
Majority		897	40.5	+12.2
Turnout		2,213	77.6	−0.4
National hold		Swing	+6.1	

=== Elections in the 1930s ===
General election 1933: Kroonstad
Party	Candidate	Votes	%	±%
National	P. J. Terreblanche	2,692	82.0	+12.8
Independent	P. C. B. Krone	557	17.0	New
Rejected ballots		22	1.0	-1.1
Majority		2,135	65.1	N/A
Turnout		3,282	47.1	−30.5
National hold		Swing	N/A	

Kroonstad by-election, 4 April 1934
Party	Candidate	Votes	%	±%
South African	G. J. Fullard	2,116	73.5	New
Independent	P. C. B. Krone	723	25.1	+8.1
Rejected ballots		38	1.4	+0.4
Majority		1,393	48.4	N/A
Turnout		2,877	44.2	−2.9
South African gain from National		Swing	N/A	

General election 1938: Kroonstad
Party	Candidate	Votes	%	±%
United	G. J. Fullard	3,830	54.8	−27.2
Purified National	J. H. Serfontein	3,096	44.3	New
Rejected ballots		63	0.9	-0.1
Majority		734	10.5	N/A
Turnout		6,989	89.2	+42.1
United hold		Swing	N/A	
