= Hoopstad (House of Assembly of South Africa constituency) =

- Former constituency for the South African House of Assembly
- Province: Orange Free State
- Electorate: 6,359 (1943)

Former constituency
- Created: 1910
- Abolished: 1948
- Number of members: 1
- Last MHA: H. S. Erasmus (NP)
- Replaced by: Boshof-Hoopstad

Hoopstad was a constituency in the Orange Free State Province of South Africa, which existed from 1910 to 1948. Named after the town of Hoopstad, the seat covered a rural area in the northwest of the province. Throughout its existence it elected one member to the House of Assembly.

== Franchise notes ==
When the Union of South Africa was formed in 1910, the electoral qualifications in use in each pre-existing colony were kept in place. In the Orange River Colony, and its predecessor the Orange Free State, the vote was restricted to white men, and as such, elections in the Orange Free State Province were held on a whites-only franchise from the beginning. The franchise was also restricted by property and education qualifications until the 1933 general election, following the passage of the Women's Enfranchisement Act, 1930 and the Franchise Laws Amendment Act, 1931. From then on, the franchise was given to all white citizens aged 21 or over. Non-whites remained disenfranchised until the end of apartheid and the introduction of universal suffrage in 1994.

== History ==
Hoopstad, like most of the Orange Free State, was a highly conservative seat throughout its existence and had a largely Afrikaans-speaking electorate. Its first MP, Hendrik Schalk Theron, had led Boer forces during the South African War, and served in Louis Botha's cabinet starting in 1913. In 1915 Theron, a member of Botha's South African Party, was defeated for re-election by Frederick Jacob Rheeder of the newly founded National Party.

Hoopstad remained a safe Nationalist seat for the next twenty years, until 1934, when the party split in two after Nationalist Prime Minister J. B. M. Hertzog decided to join forces with Jan Smuts to create the United Party. While many conservative Afrikaners broke away from the new party to form the Purified National Party under D. F. Malan's leadership, Hoopstad MP Johannes Hendrikus Viljoen stayed loyal to Hertzog and successfully defended his seat at the 1938 general election. Like many of his ex-Nationalist colleagues, however, he broke away once Smuts took over the party and led South Africa into World War II, joining Nicolaas Havenga's Afrikaner Party and contesting his seat under that label in 1943. In that election, Hoopstad's last as a constituency, Viljoen placed third and the Herenigde Nasionale Party took the seat with Hendrik Schalk Erasmus. In 1948, Hoopstad was combined with the neighbouring seat of Boshof, and Erasmus was elected to the combined seat.

== Members ==
Election	Member	Party
1910	Hendrik Schalk Theron	Orangia Unie
1915	F. J. Rheeder	National
1920	Edwin Alfred Conroy	National
1921	Edwin Alfred Conroy	National
1924	Edwin Alfred Conroy	National
1929	Edwin Alfred Conroy	National
1933	Johannes Hendrikus Viljoen	National
1934	Johannes Hendrikus Viljoen	United
1938	Johannes Hendrikus Viljoen	United
1940	Johannes Hendrikus Viljoen	Afrikaner
1943	Hendrik Schalk Erasmus	HNP
1948	constituency abolished	

== Detailed results ==
=== Elections in the 1910s ===
General election 1910: Hoopstad
Party	Candidate	Votes	%	±%
Orangia Unie	Hendrik Schalk Theron	Unopposed		
Orangia Unie win (new seat)				

General election 1915: Hoopstad
Party	Candidate	Votes	%	±%
National	F. J. Rheeders	1,069	62.8	New
South African	Hendrik Schalk Theron	633	37.2	N/A
Majority		436	25.6	N/A
Turnout		1,702	73.6	N/A
National gain from South African		Swing	N/A	

=== Elections in the 1920s ===
General election 1920: Hoopstad
Party	Candidate	Votes	%	±%
National	E. A. Conroy	1,155	68.1	+5.3
South African	P. G. Theron	540	31.9	−5.3
Majority		615	36.2	+10.6
Turnout		1,695	62.2	−11.4
National hold		Swing	+5.3	

General election 1921: Hoopstad
Party	Candidate	Votes	%	±%
National	E. A. Conroy	1,280	69.3	+1.2
South African	Hendrik Schalk Theron	567	30.7	−1.2
Majority		615	38.6	+2.4
Turnout		1,847	64.3	+2.1
National hold		Swing	+1.2	

General election 1924: Hoopstad
Party	Candidate	Votes	%	±%
National	E. A. Conroy	1,376	69.2	−0.1
South African	G. R. Theron	573	28.8	−1.9
Rejected ballots		39	2.0	N/A
Majority		803	40.6	+2.0
Turnout		1,988	72.3	+8.0
National hold		Swing	+1.0	

General election 1929: Hoopstad
Party	Candidate	Votes	%	±%
National	E. A. Conroy	1,340	69.5	+0.3
South African	G. R. Theron	542	28.1	−0.7
Rejected ballots		45	2.4	+0.4
Majority		798	41.6	+1.0
Turnout		1,927	73.9	+1.6
National hold		Swing	+0.5	

=== Elections in the 1930s ===
General election 1933: Hoopstad
Party	Candidate	Votes	%	±%
National	J. H. Viljoen	Unopposed		
National hold				

General election 1938: Hoopstad
Party	Candidate	Votes	%	±%
United	J. H. Viljoen	3,414	52.9	N/A
Purified National	Eben Dönges	3,021	46.7	New
Rejected ballots		24	0.4	N/A
Majority		402	6.2	N/A
Turnout		6,450	95.8	N/A
United hold		Swing	N/A	
