= Vryheid (House of Assembly of South Africa constituency) =

- Former constituency for the South African House of Assembly
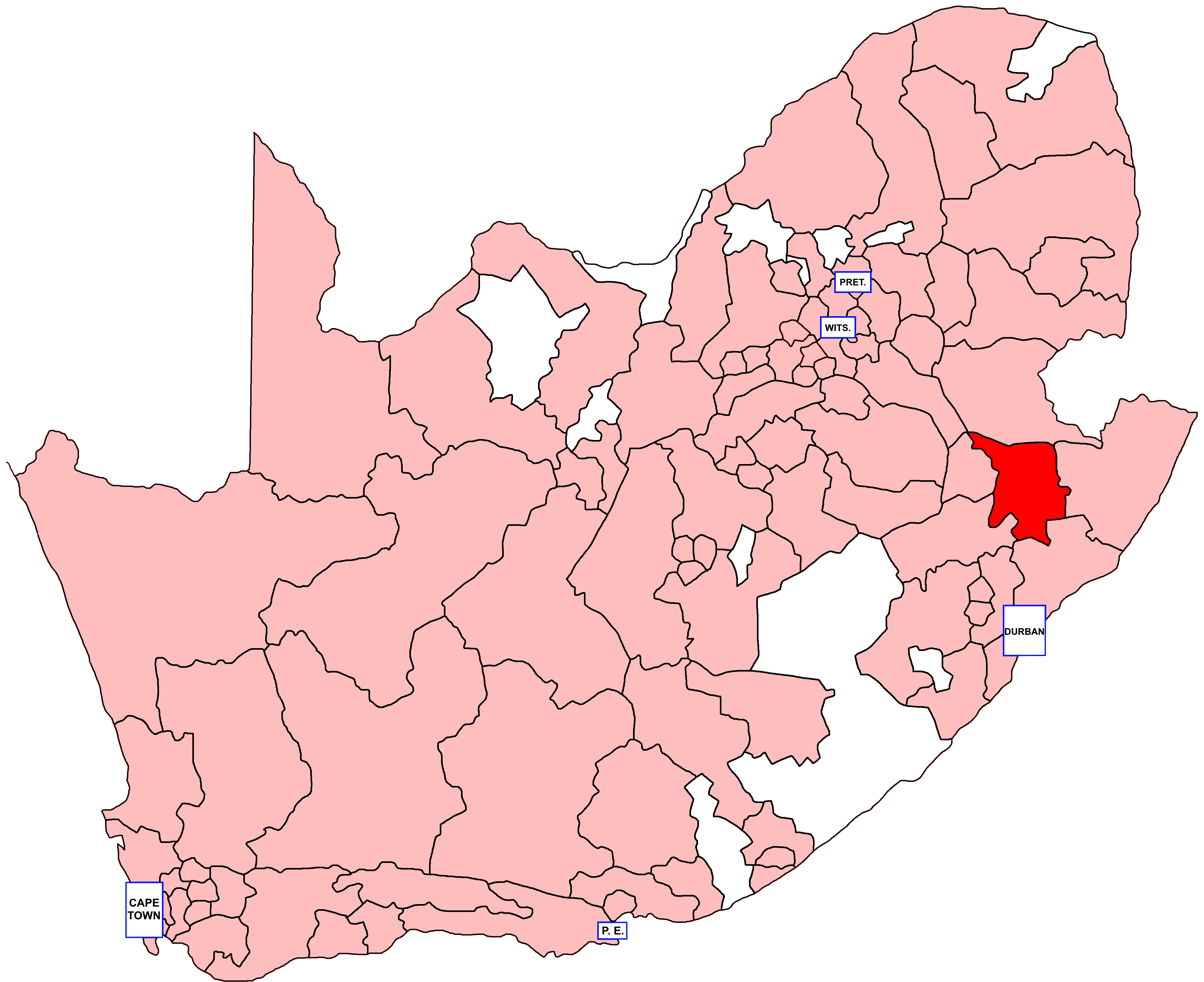
- Location of Vryheid within South Africa (1981)
- Province: Natal
- Electorate: 15,925 (1989)

Former constituency
- Created: 1910
- Abolished: 1994
- Number of members: 1
- Last MHA: Jurie Mentz (Ind-IFP)
- Replaced by: KwaZulu-Natal

Vryheid was a constituency in the Natal Province of South Africa, which existed from 1910 to 1994. It covered a region of northern Natal centred on its namesake town. Throughout its existence it elected one member to the House of Assembly.

== Franchise notes ==
When the Union of South Africa was formed in 1910, the electoral qualifications in use in each pre-existing colony were kept in place. The franchise used in the Natal Colony, while theoretically not restricted by race, was significantly less liberal than that of the Cape, and no more than a few hundred non-white electors ever qualified. In 1908, an estimated 200 of the 22,786 electors in the colony were of non-European descent, and by 1935, only one remained. By 1958, when the last non-white voters in the Cape were taken off the rolls, Natal too had an all-white electorate. The franchise was also restricted by property and education qualifications until the 1933 general election, following the passage of the Women's Enfranchisement Act, 1930 and the Franchise Laws Amendment Act, 1931. From then on, the franchise was given to all white citizens aged 21 or over, which remained the case until the end of apartheid and the introduction of universal suffrage in 1994.

== History ==
While most of Natal's white population (and, consequently, most of its electorate during the pre-1994 era) was English-speaking, the northwest of the province was more mixed, and Vryheid had a large Afrikaner presence throughout its existence. This made its politics (along with the neighbouring seats of Klip River and Newcastle) different from those of Natal as a whole, and the National Party had a significant foothold in the seat from its founding. It was first taken by the party in 1921, with Ernest George Jansen, who would represent Vryheid until 1943 and serve as Speaker of the House of Assembly for a large part of that period. A loyal ally of J. B. M. Hertzog, Jansen followed Hertzog into the United Party in 1934, then back out of it in 1939 after South Africa declared war on Germany, but stayed on as Speaker until 1943 despite being an opposition MP. In that year's general election, he was defeated by the United Party's Louis Stefanus Steenkamp, but the UP lost Vryheid again, along with many other rural seats, in 1948. It passed to former Hoopstad MP Johannes Hendrikus Viljoen, who was initially elected for the Afrikaner Party, but joined the National Party soon after. Viljoen served as a cabinet minister under Malan and Strijdom, dying in office in December 1957, close enough to the expiry of the 1953-58 parliament that no by-election was held.

The National Party won every subsequent election in Vryheid, though none of its subsequent members served in cabinet. Its final MP, Jurie Mentz, was first elected in 1978, and served in a leadership role in the NP parliamentary caucus until January 1993, at which point he defected to the Inkatha Freedom Party out of a desire to strengthen anti-communist forces in post-apartheid South Africa. He was elected to the National Assembly for the IFP in 1994, and served a single term in the new non-racial parliament.

== Members ==
Election	Member	Party
1910	M. W. Myburgh	Ind. South African
1915	M. W. Myburgh	South African
1920	J. J. C. Emmett	South African
1921	Ernest George Jansen	National
1924	Ernest George Jansen	National
1929	Ernest George Jansen	National
1933	Ernest George Jansen	National
1934	Ernest George Jansen	United
1938	Ernest George Jansen	United
1939	Ernest George Jansen	HNP
1943	L. S. Steenkamp	United
1948	J. H. Viljoen	Afrikaner
1953	J. H. Viljoen	National
1958	D. J. Potgieter	National
1961	D. J. Potgieter	National
1966	J. P. C. le Roux	National
1970	J. P. C. le Roux	National
1974	J. P. C. le Roux	National
1977	J. P. C. le Roux	National
1978 by	Jurie Mentz	National
1981	Jurie Mentz	National
1987	Jurie Mentz	National
1989	Jurie Mentz	National
1993	Jurie Mentz	Ind-IFP
1994	Constituency abolished	

== Detailed results ==
=== Elections in the 1910s ===
General election 1910: Vryheid
Party	Candidate	Votes	%	±%
Ind. South African	M. W. Myburgh	377	50.0	New
South African	B. E. A. Rabe	377	50.0	New
Majority		0	0.0	N/A
South African win (new seat)				

Election decided by lot.

General election 1915: Vryheid
Party	Candidate	Votes	%	±%
South African	M. W. Myburgh	606	60.8	New
National	F. W. van Raenen	390	39.2	New
Majority		216	21.6	N/A
Turnout		996	58.5	N/A
South African hold		Swing	N/A	

=== Elections in the 1920s ===
General election 1920: Vryheid
Party	Candidate	Votes	%	±%
South African	J. J. C. Emmett	764	52.7	−8.1
National	E. G. Jansen	683	47.3	+8.1
Majority		81	5.4	−16.2
Turnout		1,447	79.0	+20.5
South African hold		Swing	-8.1	

General election 1921: Vryheid
Party	Candidate	Votes	%	±%
National	Ernest George Jansen	765	50.1	+2.8
South African	J. J. C. Emmett	762	49.9	−2.8
Majority		3	0.2	N/A
Turnout		1,527	79.7	+0.7
National gain from South African		Swing	+2.8	

General election 1924: Vryheid
Party	Candidate	Votes	%	±%
National	Ernest George Jansen	999	54.5	+4.4
South African	B. J. E. Human	823	44.9	−5.0
Rejected ballots		11	0.6	N/A
Majority		176	9.6	+9.4
Turnout		1,833	86.0	+6.3
National hold		Swing	+4.7	

General election 1929: Vryheid
Party	Candidate	Votes	%	±%
National	Ernest George Jansen	1,157	58.0	+3.5
South African	P. J. Wessels	826	41.4	−3.5
Rejected ballots		12	0.6	N/A
Majority		331	16.6	+7.0
Turnout		1,995	84.1	−1.9
National hold		Swing	+3.5	

=== Elections in the 1930s ===
General election 1933: Vryheid
Party	Candidate	Votes	%	±%
National	Ernest George Jansen	3,082	71.3	+13.3
Independent	P. J. Wessels	1,205	27.9	New
Rejected ballots		36	0.8	+0.2
Majority		1,877	43.4	N/A
Turnout		4,323	76.2	−7.9
National hold		Swing	N/A	

General election 1938: Vryheid
Party	Candidate	Votes	%	±%
United	Ernest George Jansen	2,658	59.9	−11.4
Purified National	D. P. du Toit	1,324	29.9	New
Greyshirt	T. Stofberg	418	9.4	New
Rejected ballots		35	0.8	+-0
Majority		1,334	30.0	N/A
Turnout		4,435	86.6	+10.4
United hold		Swing	N/A	
