= Ladybrand (House of Assembly of South Africa constituency) =

- Former constituency for the South African House of Assembly
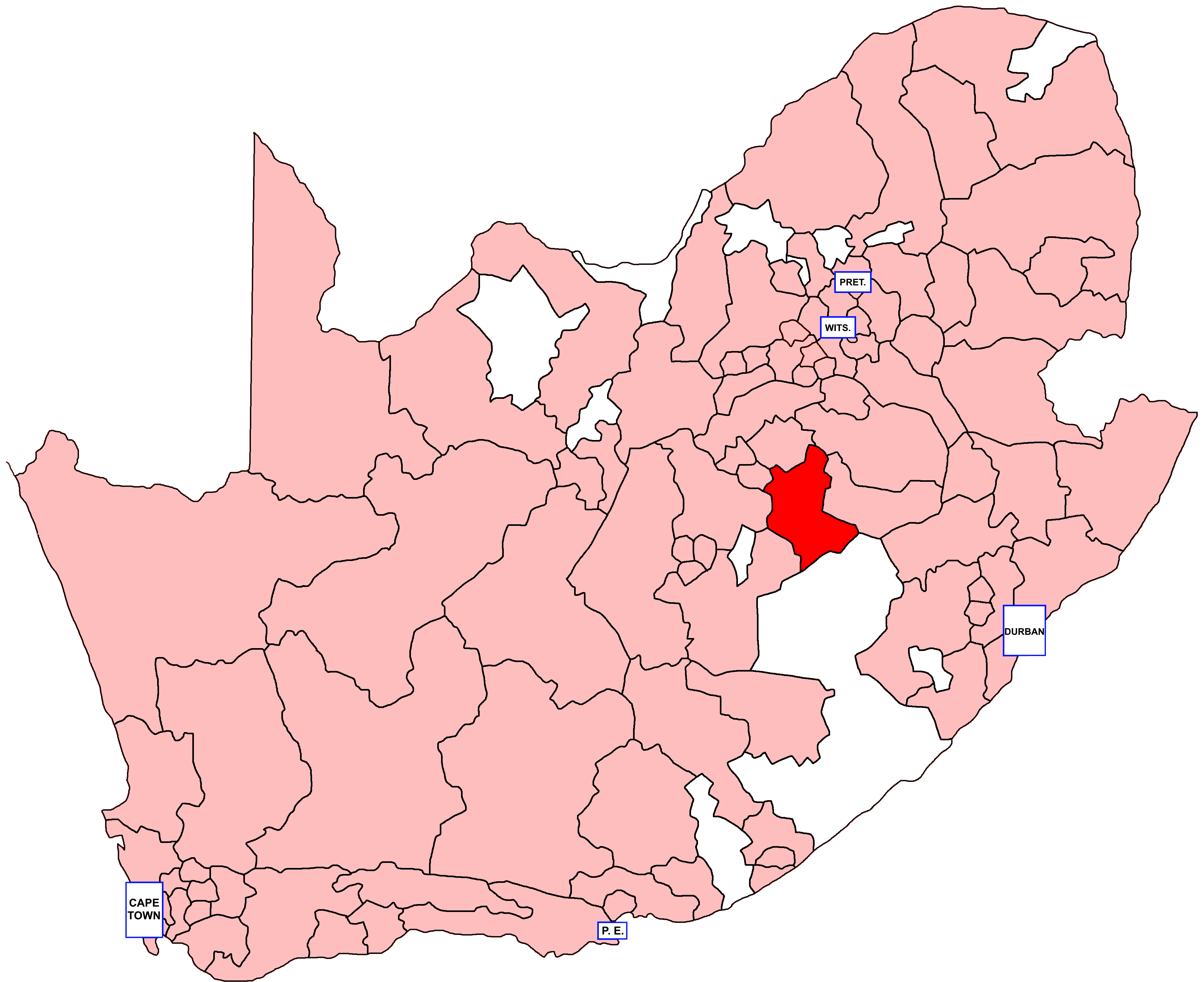
- Location of Ladybrand within South Africa (1981)
- Province: Orange Free State
- Electorate: 13,989 (1991 by)

Former constituency
- Created: 1910
- Abolished: 1994
- Number of members: 1
- Last MHA: C. E. Hertzog (CP)
- Replaced by: Free State

Ladybrand was a constituency in the Orange Free State Province of South Africa, which existed from 1910 to 1994. Named after the town of Ladybrand, the seat covered a rural area in the east of the province, bordering Lesotho. Throughout its existence it elected one member to the House of Assembly.

== Franchise notes ==
When the Union of South Africa was formed in 1910, the electoral qualifications in use in each pre-existing colony were kept in place. In the Orange River Colony, and its predecessor the Orange Free State, the vote was restricted to white men, and as such, elections in the Orange Free State Province were held on a whites-only franchise from the beginning. The franchise was also restricted by property and education qualifications until the 1933 general election, following the passage of the Women's Enfranchisement Act, 1930 and the Franchise Laws Amendment Act, 1931. From then on, the franchise was given to all white citizens aged 21 or over. Non-whites remained disenfranchised until the end of apartheid and the introduction of universal suffrage in 1994.

== History ==
Ladybrand, like most of the Orange Free State, was a highly conservative seat throughout its existence and had a largely Afrikaans-speaking electorate. It was an early stronghold for the National Party, whose founding leader J. B. M. Hertzog enjoyed widespread popularity with the Free State's Afrikaner population. In 1934, Hertzog joined forces with Jan Smuts and the SAP to create the United Party, a move that was controversial with his Afrikaner base, and nineteen Nationalist MPs broke away to form the Purified National Party under D. F. Malan's leadership. One of the nineteen was Ladybrand MP Charles Robberts Swart, who, unusually, lost his seat to the official UP candidate (and outgoing MP for the neighbouring, abolished seat of Wepener) Jan Cloete de Wet. De Wet, however, was on the Afrikaner nationalist end of the UP, and left the party along with Hertzog after South Africa joined World War II. He joined Nicolaas Havenga's Afrikaner Party in 1940, and contested his seat under that label in 1943, but like all other Afrikaner Party candidates in that election, placed a distant third. In 1948, the AP formed an electoral pact with the Herenigde Nasionale Party, and Havenga himself was nominated to contest Ladybrand for the alliance, winning by a wide margin.

After the AP dissolved and Havenga joined the NP, Ladybrand became a safe seat for the governing party, being held by them for forty years continuously. As in many other rural seats, however, they began to see strong challenges from the right during the 1980s, with first the Herstigte Nasionale Party and then the Conservative Party winning more and more votes. In 1989, the CP finally took the seat, and held it at a 1991 by-election, one of the last whites-only elections held in South Africa.

== Members ==
Election	Member	Party
1910	Charles Gustav Fichardt	Orangia Unie
1915	Charles Gustav Fichardt	National
1920	Charles Gustav Fichardt	National
1921	Charles Gustav Fichardt	National
1923 by	Charles Robberts Swart	National
1924	Charles Robberts Swart	National
1929	Charles Robberts Swart	National
1933	Charles Robberts Swart	National
1934	Charles Robberts Swart	GNP
1938	Jan Cloete de Wet	United
1940	Jan Cloete de Wet	Afrikaner
1943	J. N. le Roux	HNP
1948	Nicolaas Christiaan Havenga	Afrikaner
1953	Nicolaas Christiaan Havenga	National
1955 by	H. C. A. Keyter	National
1958	H. C. A. Keyter	National
1961	H. C. A. Keyter	National
1966	H. C. A. Keyter	National
1970	H. C. A. Keyter	National
1974	J. C. van den Berg	National
1977	J. C. van den Berg	National
1981	J. C. van den Berg	National
1987	A. S. van der Merwe	National
1989	P. H. van Rhijn	Conservative
1991 by	C. E. Hertzog	Conservative
1994	constituency abolished	

== Detailed results ==
=== Elections in the 1910s ===
General election 1910: Ladybrand
Party	Candidate	Votes	%	±%
Orangia Unie	C. G. Fichardt	Unopposed		
Orangia Unie win (new seat)				

General election 1915: Ladybrand
Party	Candidate	Votes	%	±%
National	C. G. Fichardt	945	62.6	N/A
South African	P. J. F. Krog	565	37.4	New
Majority		380	25.2	N/A
Turnout		1,510	64.3	N/A
National hold		Swing	N/A	

=== Elections in the 1920s ===
General election 1920: Ladybrand
Party	Candidate	Votes	%	±%
National	C. G. Fichardt	1,129	60.7	−1.9
South African	G. J. van Riet	731	39.3	+1.9
Majority		380	21.4	−3.8
Turnout		1,860	64.2	−0.1
National hold		Swing	-1.9	

General election 1921: Ladybrand
Party	Candidate	Votes	%	±%
National	Charles Gustav Fichardt	1,268	65.6	+4.9
South African	Esaias Reinier Grobler	664	34.4	−4.9
Majority		380	31.2	+9.8
Turnout		1,932	63.2	−1.0
National hold		Swing	+4.9	

Ladybrand by-election, 25 July 1923
Party	Candidate	Votes	%	±%
National	Charles Robberts Swart	1,781	58.7	−6.9
South African	J. Crowther	1,254	41.3	+6.9
Majority		1,258	17.4	−13.8
Turnout		3,035	84.9	+11.7
National hold		Swing	-6.9	

General election 1924: Ladybrand
Party	Candidate	Votes	%	±%
National	C. R. Swart	1,471	76.3	+10.7
South African	J. H. van Rheenen	439	22.8	−11.6
Rejected ballots		16	0.9	+9.8
Majority		1,032	53.5	+22.3
Turnout		1,929	75.9	+12.7
National hold		Swing	+11.2	

General election 1929: Ladybrand
Party	Candidate	Votes	%	±%
National	C. R. Swart	1,482	74.2	−2.1
South African	H. C. van Breda	499	25.0	+2.2
Rejected ballots		16	0.8	-0.1
Majority		983	49.2	−4.3
Turnout		1,997	77.0	+1.1
National hold		Swing	-2.2	

=== Elections in the 1930s ===
General election 1933: Ladybrand
Party	Candidate	Votes	%	±%
National	C. R. Swart	Unopposed		
National hold				

General election 1938: Ladybrand
Party	Candidate	Votes	%	±%
United	Jan Cloete de Wet	3,476	52.3	New
Purified National	Charles Robberts Swart	3,112	46.8	N/A
Rejected ballots		58	0.9	N/A
Majority		364	5.5	N/A
Turnout		6,646	93.3	N/A
United gain from Purified National		Swing	N/A	

=== Elections in the 1990s ===
Ladybrand by-election, 22 May 1991
Party	Candidate	Votes	%	±%
Conservative	C. E. Hertzog	6,276	55.3	+7.0
National	C. J. Smit	5,018	44.2	−3.6
Rejected ballots		52	0.4	N/A
Majority		1,258	11.1	+10.6
Turnout		11,346	81.1	−1.1
Conservative hold		Swing	+5.3	
