= Klip River (House of Assembly of South Africa constituency) =

- Kliprivier
- Former constituency for the South African House of Assembly
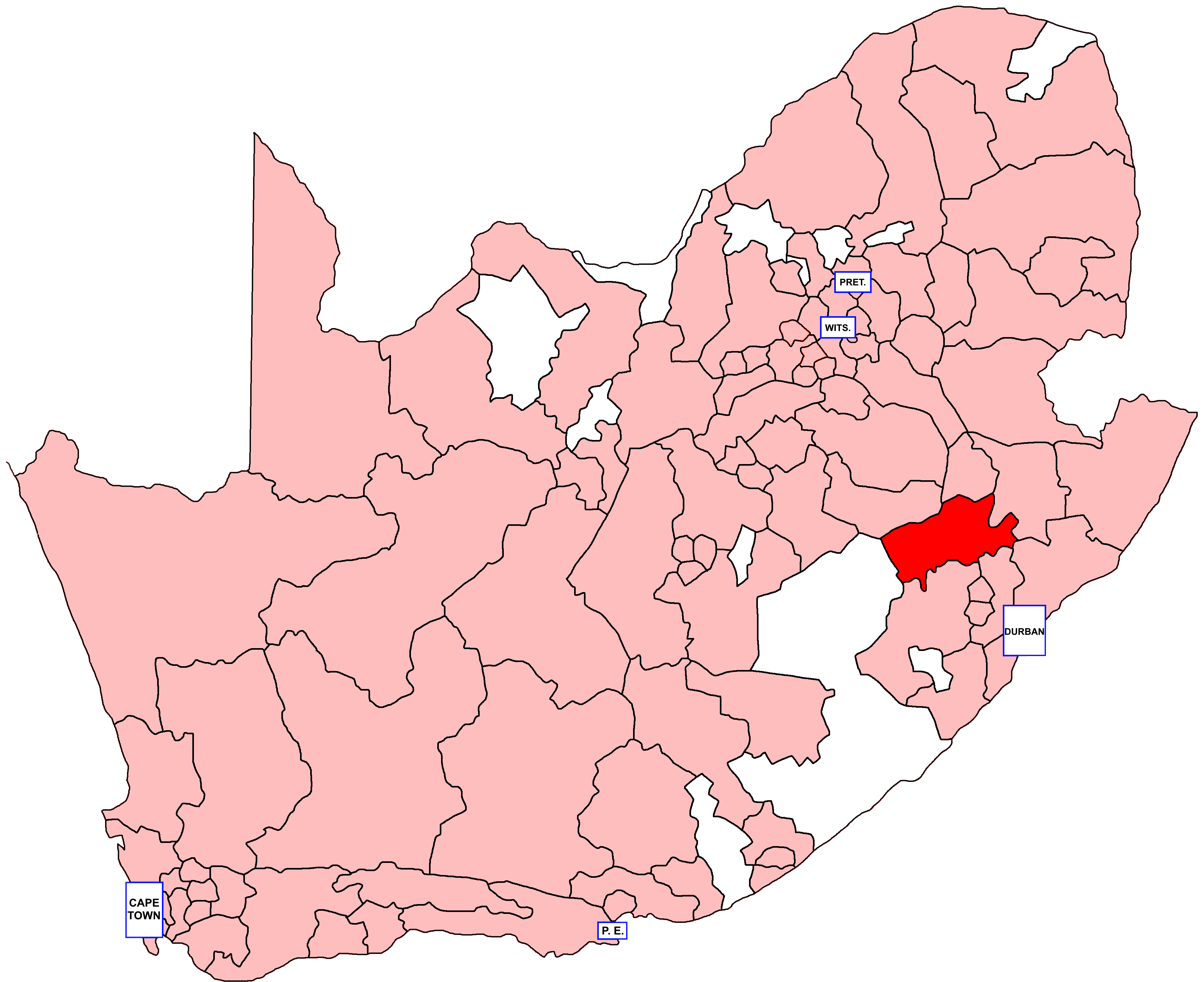
- Location of Klip River within South Africa (1981)
- Province: Natal
- Electorate: 15,107 (1989)

Former constituency
- Created: 1910; 1966
- Abolished: 1953; 1994
- Number of members: 1
- Last MHA: J. W. Maree (NP)
- Replaced by: KwaZulu-Natal (1994)

Klip River (Afrikaans: Kliprivier) was a constituency in the Natal Province of South Africa, which existed from 1910 to 1953 and again from 1966 to 1994. It covered a region of northwestern Natal along its namesake river, centred on the town of Ladysmith. Throughout its existence it elected one member to the House of Assembly.

== Franchise notes ==
When the Union of South Africa was formed in 1910, the electoral qualifications in use in each pre-existing colony were kept in place. The franchise used in the Natal Colony, while theoretically not restricted by race, was significantly less liberal than that of the Cape, and no more than a few hundred non-white electors ever qualified. In 1908, an estimated 200 of the 22,786 electors in the colony were of non-European descent, and by 1935, only one remained. By 1958, when the last non-white voters in the Cape were taken off the rolls, Natal too had an all-white electorate. The franchise was also restricted by property and education qualifications until the 1933 general election, following the passage of the Women's Enfranchisement Act, 1930 and the Franchise Laws Amendment Act, 1931. From then on, the franchise was given to all white citizens aged 21 or over, which remained the case until the end of apartheid and the introduction of universal suffrage in 1994.

== History ==
While most of Natal's white population (and, consequently, most of its electorate during the pre-1994 era) was English-speaking, the northwest of the province was more mixed, and Klip River had a large Afrikaner presence throughout its existence. This made its politics (along with the neighbouring seats of Newcastle and Vryheid) different from those of Natal as a whole, and the National Party had a significant foothold in the seat from its founding. However, while some elections were closely fought, the Nationalists never took the seat in its first iteration. The seat's first MP, Henry Wiltshire, left parliament just after the 1915 general election, and the resulting by-election was won unopposed by cabinet minister Henry Burton, who had lost his seat of Albert in the Cape Province. Burton was seen as a liberal within the governing party, supporting the non-racial franchise and having strong ties to the SANNC, and served as Minister of Finance during his time as member for Klip River. In that role, he became best known for passing a series of austerity budgets, and the unpopularity of those measures helped cause the SAP's defeat at the 1924 general election. Burton moved to Ladismith in the Cape for that election, and while he lost his race, Klip River stayed with the SAP by a narrow margin. A sequence of SAP and United Party MPs followed, which was broken at the watershed 1948 general election, in which the Afrikaner Party (a pro-Hertzog faction of the United Party that had elected not to follow Hertzog himself into the Herenigde Nasionale Party, but which was closely allied to the HNP) captured both Klip River and Vryheid.

Klip River disappeared from the electoral map in 1953, but returned in 1966, and in its second iteration was a safe seat for the governing National Party. Its most notable MP during this period was Theo Gerdener, who was elected in a 1970 by-election following his time as Administrator of Natal. During his time as MP for Klip River, he served as Minister of Internal Affairs, but grew disillusioned with John Vorster's hard line and broke away from the governing party in 1973, forming his own short-lived Democratic Party. This party did not see any success in the following year's general election, and Klip River was retaken by the NP by a strong margin. They would hold the seat until its abolition in 1994, facing mainly Conservative Party opposition in later years.

== Members ==
Election	Member	Party
1910	Henry Wiltshire	Independent
1915	Henry Wiltshire	South African
1915 by	Henry Burton	South African
1920	Henry Burton	South African
1921	Henry Burton	South African
1924	H. E. K. Anderson	South African
1929	H. E. K. Anderson	South African
1933	William Cochrane	South African
1934	William Cochrane	United
1938	G. A. Friend	United
1943	G. A. Friend	United
1948	J. S. Labuschagne	Afrikaner
1953	Constituency abolished	

Election	Member	Party
1966	P. H. Torlage	National
1970	P. H. Torlage	National
1970 by	Theo Gerdener	National
1973	Theo Gerdener	Democratic
1974	V. A. Volker	National
1977	V. A. Volker	National
1981	V. A. Volker	National
1986 by	J. W. Maree	National
1987	J. W. Maree	National
1989	J. W. Maree	National
1994	Constituency abolished	

== Detailed results ==
=== Elections in the 1910s ===
General election 1910: Klip River
Party	Candidate	Votes	%	±%
Independent	Henry Wiltshire	493	50.2	New
Independent	T. Hyslop	489	49.8	New
Majority		4	0.4	N/A
Independent win (new seat)				

General election 1915: Klip River
Party	Candidate	Votes	%	±%
South African	Henry Wiltshire	912	76.8	+26.6
National	L. W. Meyer	276	23.2	New
Majority		636	53.6	N/A
Turnout		1,188	64.1	N/A
South African hold		Swing	N/A	

Klip River by-election, 1 November 1915
Party	Candidate	Votes	%	±%
South African	Henry Burton	Unopposed		
South African hold				

=== Elections in the 1920s ===
General election 1920: Klip River
Party	Candidate	Votes	%	±%
South African	Henry Burton	809	59.5	−17.3
National	A. T. Spies	382	28.1	+4.9
Labour	M. Mulder	168	12.4	New
Majority		427	31.4	−22.2
Turnout		1,359	71.1	+7.0
South African hold		Swing	-11.1	

General election 1921: Klip River
Party	Candidate	Votes	%	±%
South African	Henry Burton	909	67.1	+7.6
National	P. W. Joynt	446	32.9	+4.8
Majority		463	34.2	+2.8
Turnout		1,355	67.1	−4.0
South African hold		Swing	+1.4	

General election 1924: Klip River
Party	Candidate	Votes	%	±%
South African	H. E. K. Anderson	792	52.0	−15.1
National	P. J. Meyer	721	47.3	+14.4
Rejected ballots		10	0.7	N/A
Majority		71	4.7	−29.5
Turnout		1,523	77.0	+9.9
South African hold		Swing	-14.8	

General election 1929: Klip River
Party	Candidate	Votes	%	±%
South African	H. E. K. Anderson	1,101	55.4	+3.4
National	W. P. Gray	871	43.9	−3.4
Rejected ballots		14	0.7	N/A
Majority		140	11.5	+6.8
Turnout		1,986	80.0	+3.0
South African hold		Swing	+3.4	

=== Elections in the 1930s ===
General election 1933: Klip River
Party	Candidate	Votes	%	±%
South African	William Cochrane	2,314	67.1	+11.7
Independent	P. J. Meyer	1,071	31.1	New
Rejected ballots		64	1.8	+1.1
Majority		1,243	36.0	N/A
Turnout		3,449	63.3	−16.7
South African hold		Swing	N/A	

General election 1938: Klip River
Party	Candidate	Votes	%	±%
United	G. A. Friend	1,997	45.6	−21.5
Independent	J. W. Sinclair	1,360	31.0	New
Purified National	J. A. Beneke	1,012	23.1	New
Rejected ballots		15	0.3	-1.5
Majority		637	14.5	N/A
Turnout		4,384	81.7	+18.4
United hold		Swing	N/A	
