= Calvinia (House of Assembly of South Africa constituency) =

Former South African parliamentary constituency (1915–1953)

- Former constituency for the South African House of Assembly
- Province: Cape of Good Hope
- Electorate: 8,673 (1948)

Former constituency
- Created: 1915
- Abolished: 1953
- Number of members: 1
- Last MHA: P. J. H. Luttig (NP)
- Created from: Clanwilliam
- Replaced by: Beaufort West

Calvinia was a constituency in the Cape Province of South Africa, which existed from 1915 to 1953. Named after the town of Calvinia, it covered part of the western Karoo region. Throughout its existence it elected one member to the House of Assembly and one to the Cape Provincial Council.

== Franchise notes ==
When the Union of South Africa was formed in 1910, the electoral qualifications in use in each pre-existing colony were kept in place. The Cape Colony had implemented a “colour-blind” franchise known as the Cape Qualified Franchise, which included all adult literate men owning more than £75 worth of property (controversially raised from £25 in 1892), and this initially remained in effect after the colony became the Cape Province. As of 1908, 22,784 out of 152,221 electors in the Cape Colony were “Native or Coloured”. Eligibility to serve in Parliament and the Provincial Council, however, was restricted to whites from 1910 onward.

The first challenge to the Cape Qualified Franchise came with the Women's Enfranchisement Act, 1930 and the Franchise Laws Amendment Act, 1931, which extended the vote to women and removed property qualifications for the white population only – non-white voters remained subject to the earlier restrictions. In 1936, the Representation of Natives Act removed all black voters from the common electoral roll and introduced three “Native Representative Members”, white MPs elected by the black voters of the province and meant to represent their interests in particular. A similar provision was made for Coloured voters with the Separate Representation of Voters Act, 1951, and although this law was challenged by the courts, it went into effect in time for the 1958 general election, which was thus held with all-white voter rolls for the first time in South African history. The all-white franchise would continue until the end of apartheid and the introduction of universal suffrage in 1994.

== History ==
Like many rural constituencies across the Cape, Calvinia was a conservative seat with a largely Afrikaans-speaking electorate. It was a safe seat for the National Party through most of its existence, and its most notable MP, representing the seat from 1919 to 1938, was future Prime Minister D. F. Malan. In 1938, Malan moved to the neighbouring seat of Piketberg, and Calvinia was won for the only time in its history by the United Party, whose candidate W. P. Steenkamp narrowly prevailed over a Purified National Party opponent. From 1943 until its abolition ten years later, it was once again held by the NP, this time under former Victoria West MP P. J. H. Luttig. When Calvinia was abolished, although Calvinia itself became part of Beaufort West, Luttig moved to the neighbouring constituency of Ceres.

== Members ==
Election	Member	Party
1915	W. P. Louw	National
1919 by	D. F. Malan	National
1920	D. F. Malan	National
1921	D. F. Malan	National
1924	D. F. Malan	National
1929	D. F. Malan	National
1933	D. F. Malan	National
1934	D. F. Malan	PNP
1938	W. P. Steenkamp	United
1943	P. J. H. Luttig	HNP
1948	P. J. H. Luttig	HNP
1953	constituency abolished	

== Detailed results ==
=== Elections in the 1910s ===
General election 1915: Calvinia
Party	Candidate	Votes	%	±%
National	W. P. Louw	1,327	56.4	New
South African	H. J. Nel	1,024	43.6	New
Majority		301	12.8	N/A
Turnout		2,351	82.8	N/A
National win (new seat)				

Calvinia by-election, 17 January 1919
Party	Candidate	Votes	%	±%
National	D. F. Malan	1,568	59.2	+2.8
South African	J. G. L. Strauss	1,080	40.8	−2.8
Majority		488	18.4	+5.6
Turnout		2,648	79.4	−3.4
National hold		Swing	+2.8	

=== Elections in the 1920s ===
General election 1920: Calvinia
Party	Candidate	Votes	%	±%
National	D. F. Malan	1,601	60.0	+3.6
South African	H. J. Nel	1,069	40.0	−3.6
Majority		301	20.0	+7.2
Turnout		2,670	76.2	−6.6
National hold		Swing	+3.6	

General election 1921: Calvinia
Party	Candidate	Votes	%	±%
National	D. F. Malan	1,541	61.1	+1.1
South African	H. J. Nel	981	38.9	−1.1
Majority		560	22.2	+2.2
Turnout		2,522	70.6	−5.6
National hold		Swing	+1.1	

General election 1924: Calvinia
Party	Candidate	Votes	%	±%
National	D. F. Malan	1,573	61.5	+0.4
South African	F. J. van der Merwe	942	36.8	−2.1
Rejected ballots		43	0.7	N/A
Majority		631	24.7	+2.5
Turnout		2,558	72.0	+1.4
National hold		Swing	+1.3	

General election 1929: Calvinia
Party	Candidate	Votes	%	±%
National	D. F. Malan	1,502	66.9	+6.4
Independent	H. J. Nel	706	31.4	New
Rejected ballots		38	1.7	+1.0
Majority		796	35.5	N/A
Turnout		2,246	75.6	+3.6
National hold		Swing	N/A	

=== Elections in the 1930s ===
General election 1933: Calvinia
Party	Candidate	Votes	%	±%
National	D. F. Malan	2,634	56.3	−10.6
Independent	A. C. S. Steenkamp	2,013	43.0	New
Rejected ballots		35	0.7	-1.0
Majority		621	13.3	N/A
Turnout		4,682	82.2	+6.6
National hold		Swing	N/A	

General election 1938: Calvinia
Party	Candidate	Votes	%	±%
United	W. P. Steenkamp	3,043	50.3	New
Purified National	A. E. Erlank	2,931	48.5	−7.8
Rejected ballots		74	1.2	N/A
Majority		112	1.9	N/A
Turnout		6,048	91.5	+9.3
United gain from Purified National		Swing	N/A	

=== Elections in the 1940s ===
General election 1943: Calvinia
Party	Candidate	Votes	%	±%
Reunited National	P. J. H. Luttig	3,742	55.9	+6.8
United	H. J. Nel	2,947	44.1	−6.8
Majority		1,046	11.8	+3.0
Turnout		6,689	86.1	−4.2
Reunited National gain from United		Swing	+1.5	

General election 1948: Calvinia
Party	Candidate	Votes	%	±%
Reunited National	P. J. H. Luttig	4,487	61.0	+5.1
United	J. A. S. Meeuwsen	2,864	39.0	−5.1
Majority		1,046	22.0	+10.2
Turnout		7,351	84.8	−1.3
Reunited National hold		Swing	+5.1	
