= Vryburg (House of Assembly of South Africa constituency) =

South African constituency, 1929–1994

- Former constituency for the South African House of Assembly
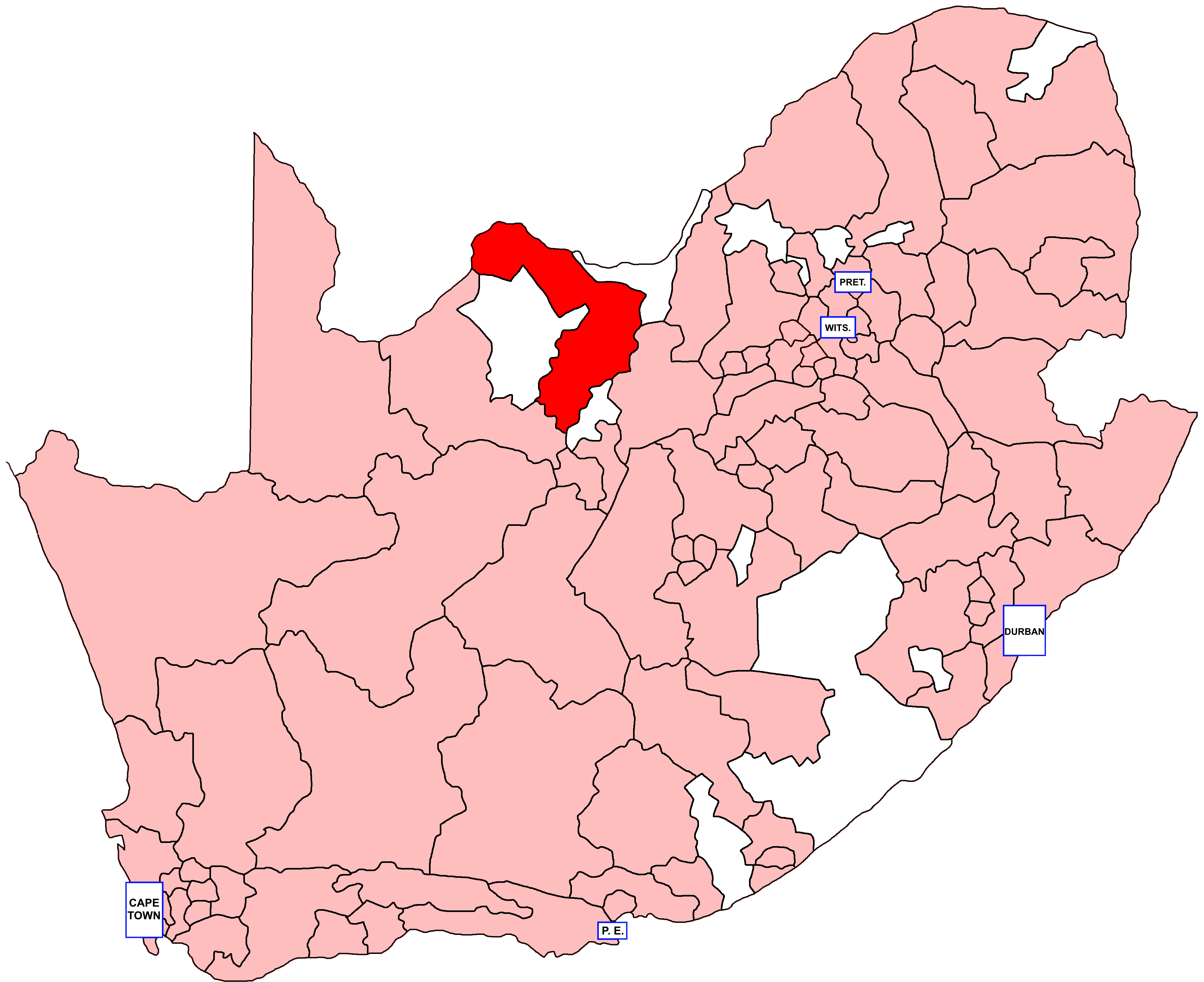
- Location of Vryburg within South Africa (1981)
- Province: Cape of Good Hope
- Electorate: 9,689 (1989)

Former constituency
- Created: 1938
- Abolished: 1994
- Number of members: 1
- Last MHA: J. H. L. Scheepers (NP)
- Created from: Bechuanaland
- Replaced by: Northern Cape

Vryburg was a constituency in the Cape Province of South Africa, which existed from 1938 to 1994. It covered a rural area of the Northern Cape centred on the town of Vryburg. Throughout its existence it elected one member to the House of Assembly and one to the Cape Provincial Council.

== Franchise notes ==
When the Union of South Africa was formed in 1910, the electoral qualifications in use in each pre-existing colony were kept in place. The Cape Colony had implemented a “colour-blind” franchise known as the Cape Qualified Franchise, which included all adult literate men owning more than £75 worth of property (controversially raised from £25 in 1892), and this initially remained in effect after the colony became the Cape Province. As of 1908, 22,784 out of 152,221 electors in the Cape Colony were “Native or Coloured”. Eligibility to serve in Parliament and the Provincial Council, however, was restricted to whites from 1910 onward.

The first challenge to the Cape Qualified Franchise came with the Women's Enfranchisement Act, 1930 and the Franchise Laws Amendment Act, 1931, which extended the vote to women and removed property qualifications for the white population only – non-white voters remained subject to the earlier restrictions. In 1936, the Representation of Natives Act removed all black voters from the common electoral roll and introduced three “Native Representative Members”, white MPs elected by the black voters of the province and meant to represent their interests in particular. A similar provision was made for Coloured voters with the Separate Representation of Voters Act, 1951, and although this law was challenged by the courts, it went into effect in time for the 1958 general election, which was thus held with all-white voter rolls for the first time in South African history. The all-white franchise would continue until the end of apartheid and the introduction of universal suffrage in 1994.

== History ==
Like many constituencies in the rural Cape, the electorate of Vryburg was largely Afrikaans-speaking and conservative, and was a safe seat for the National Party through most of its history. It largely replaced the seat of Bechuanaland when created in 1938, and Bechuanaland MP Petrus Johannes du Plessis stood for and won the new seat for the United Party. His party colleague, Pieter Hendrik de Kock, held the seat in 1943, but in 1948, he lost re-election to the Afrikaner Party's Johannes Hendrikus Viljoen, former MP for Hoopstad in the Free State. The AP was closely allied with the Herenigde Nasionale Party, and Viljoen returned to the National Party along with his colleagues when the two parties merged in 1951. He joined the cabinet in 1950 and served in various ministries until his death in December 1957, close enough to the 1958 general election deadline that no by-election was held. His successors all stayed on the backbenches, but Vryburg remained a safe Nationalist seat - in its later elections, the Conservative Party were occasionally able to put up a strong challenge, but never took the seat.

== Members ==
| Election | Member | Party |
|---|---|---|
| 1938 | P. J. du Plessis | United |
| 1943 | P. H. de Kock | United |
| 1948 | Johannes Hendrikus Viljoen | Afrikaner |
| 1951 | Johannes Hendrikus Viljoen | National |
| 1953 | Johannes Hendrikus Viljoen | National |
| 1958 | J. S. Labuschagne | National |
| 1961 | J. S. Labuschagne | National |
| 1966 | J. P. du Toit | National |
| 1970 | J. P. du Toit | National |
| 1974 | J. P. du Toit | National |
| 1977 | J. P. du Toit | National |
| 1981 | J. P. du Toit | National |
| 1985 by | J. H. L. Scheepers | National |
| 1987 | J. H. L. Scheepers | National |
| 1989 | J. H. L. Scheepers | National |
| 1994 | constituency abolished | |

== Detailed results ==
=== Elections in the 1930s ===
General election 1938: Vryburg
| Party | Candidate | Votes | % | ±% |
|---|---|---|---|---|
| United | P. J. du Plessis | 3,205 | 56.6 | New |
| Purified National | B. J. de Klerk | 2,410 | 42.5 | New |
| Rejected ballots | | 50 | 0.9 | N/A |
| Majority | | 795 | 14.0 | N/A |
| Turnout | | 5,665 | 86.6 | N/A |
| United win (new seat) | | | | |
