= Volksparty =

South African political party

The Volksparty (VP) (People's Party) was a short-lived South African political party from 1939 to 1941.

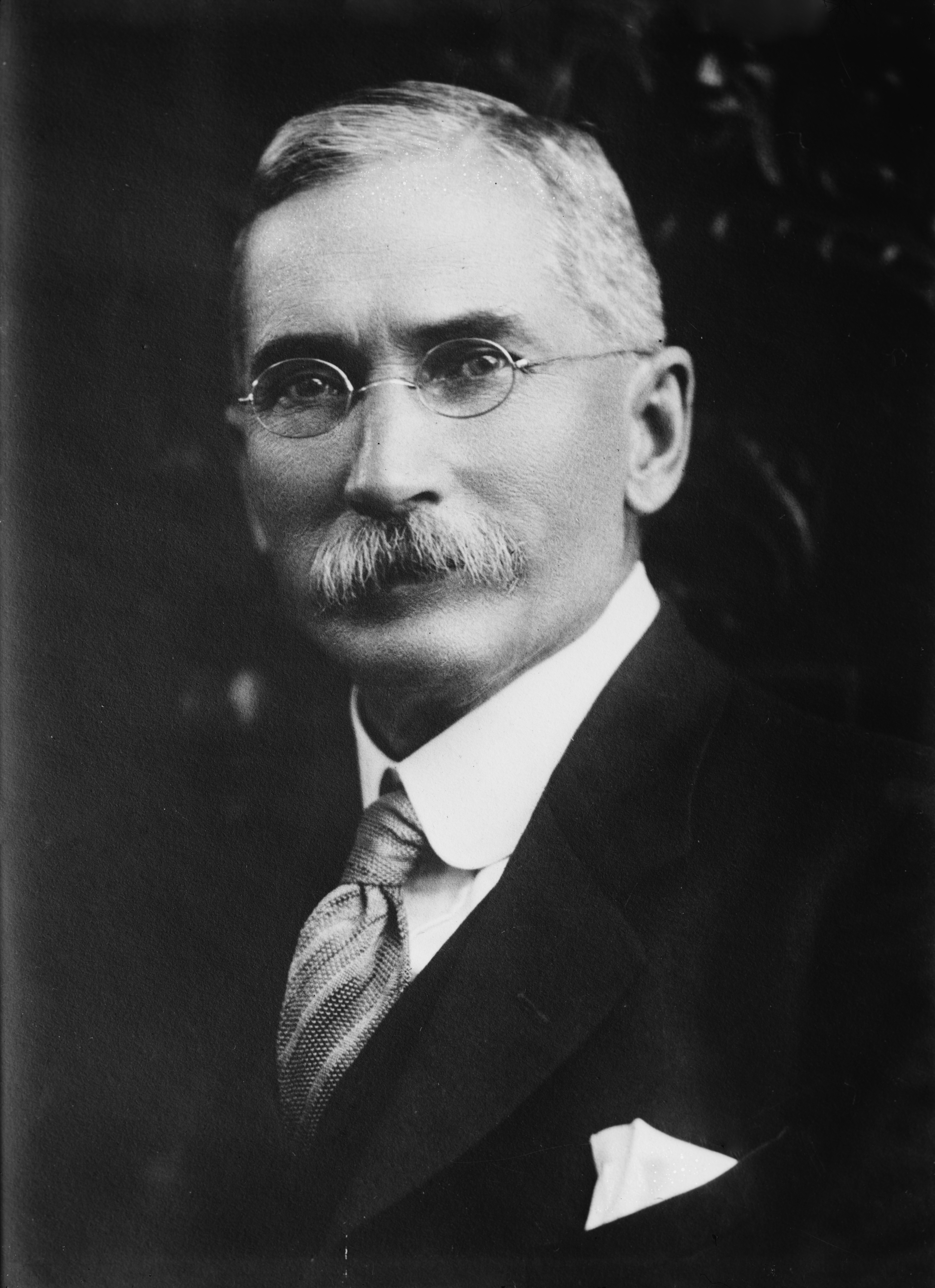
J.B.M. Hertzog

In 1934 the coalition government of the National Party under J.B.M. Hertzog and the South African Party under Jan Smuts merged to form the United Party, which won 111 of the 150 seats in the South African general election, 1938 with Hertzog as prime minister. Dissident National Party members formed the Gesuiwerde Nasionale Party under D.F. Malan.

When the United Kingdom declared war on Germany in 1939, Hertzog proposed to his party and parliament that South Africa remain neutral. This was defeated and Hertzog left the government to be replaced by Smuts with South Africa joining the Allies. Following the rupture of the United Party, Hertzog and his supporters negotiated with the Gesuiwerde Nasionale Party in an attempt to reunify the Afrikaner parties. Initially, the differences between the more moderate Hertzog group and Gesuiwerde Nasionale Party seemed insurmountable and so the Volksparty was formed with Ben Schoeman elected as the chairman of the party on 9 December 1939.

After difficult negotiations with Malan, the joint opposition called itself Gesuiwerde Nasionale Party of Volksparty (Purified National Party or People's Party) nominally under Hertzog's leadership from January 1940. But further disagreements led to another split in 1941 with Hertzog and Nicolaas Havenga forming the Afrikaner Party and Malan the Herenigde Nasionale Party (Re-united National Party). These two parties together won the South African general election, 1948, and then merged calling themselves the National Party again.
