= Johannes Hendrikus Viljoen =

South African politician

The Honourable Johannes Hendrikus Viljoen
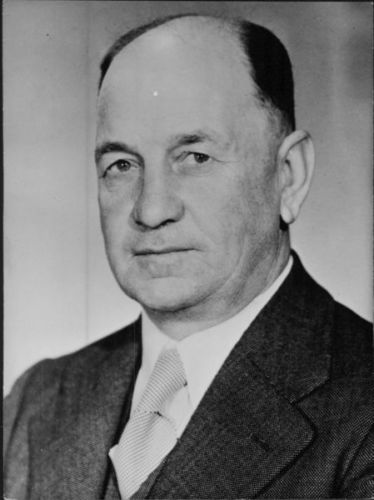
- Viljoen in 1950

Minister of Health
- In office 1956–1957
- Monarch: Elizabeth II
- Governor General: Ernest George Jansen
- Prime Minister: J. G. Strijdom
- Preceded by: Tom Naudé
- Succeeded by: M.D.C. de Wet Nel

Minister of Forestry
- In office 1954–1956
- Monarch: Elizabeth II
- Governor General: Ernest George Jansen
- Prime Minister: D. F. Malan; J. G. Strijdom

Minister of Social Affairs
- In office 1953–1954
- Monarch: Elizabeth II
- Governor General: Ernest George Jansen
- Prime Minister: D. F. Malan; J. G. Strijdom

Minister of Education
- In office 1950–1957
- Monarchs: George VI; Elizabeth II
- Governors General: Gideon Brand van Zyl; Ernest George Jansen
- Prime Minister: D. F. Malan; J. G. Strijdom
- Preceded by: C. R. Swart
- Succeeded by: Jan Jonathan Serfontein

Minister of Mines
- In office 1950–1953
- Monarchs: George VI; Elizabeth II
- Governors General: Gideon Brand van Zyl; Ernest George Jansen
- Prime Minister: D. F. Malan

Member of the House of Assembly
- In office 1948–1957
- Constituency: Vryburg

Member of the House of Assembly
- In office 1933–1941
- Constituency: Hoopstad

Personal details
- Born: October 15, 1893 Wesselsbron, Orange Free State
- Died: December 5, 1957 (aged 64)
- Resting place: Wesselsbron, Orange Free State
- Party: National Party
- Other political affiliations: Afrikaner Party
- Occupation: Politician

Johannes Hendrikus Viljoen (15 October 1893 – 5 December 1957) was a South African politician, member of parliament for the constituencies of Hoopstad (1933–1941) and Vryburg (1948–1957), Minister of Mines (1950–1953), Education, Arts and Sciences (1950–1957), Social Affairs (1953–1954), Forestry (1954–1956) and Health (1956–1957) in both Daniël François Malan's and Johannes Gerhardus Strijdom's cabinets.

== Political career ==
Viljoen was the son of JH (Jan) Viljoen (1869–1955), a veteran of the Second Boer War and of his wife, Lenie Maré.

Viljoen was successively a member of the National Party, of the United Party (1934–1941), of the Afrikaner Party (1941–1943) then again of the National Party.

After defeating Eben Dönges in the 1938 South African general election, J.H. Viljoen was a supporter of South Africa's neutrality at the outbreak of World War II and a staunch supporter of James Barry Munnik Hertzog.

== Death ==
Aged 64, while a member of the Strijdom government, he died of a long illness in Pretoria on 5 December 1957 and was buried in Wesselsbron in the Orange Free State.
