= Piketberg (House of Assembly of South Africa constituency) =

South African constituency, 1910–1994

- Former constituency for the South African House of Assembly
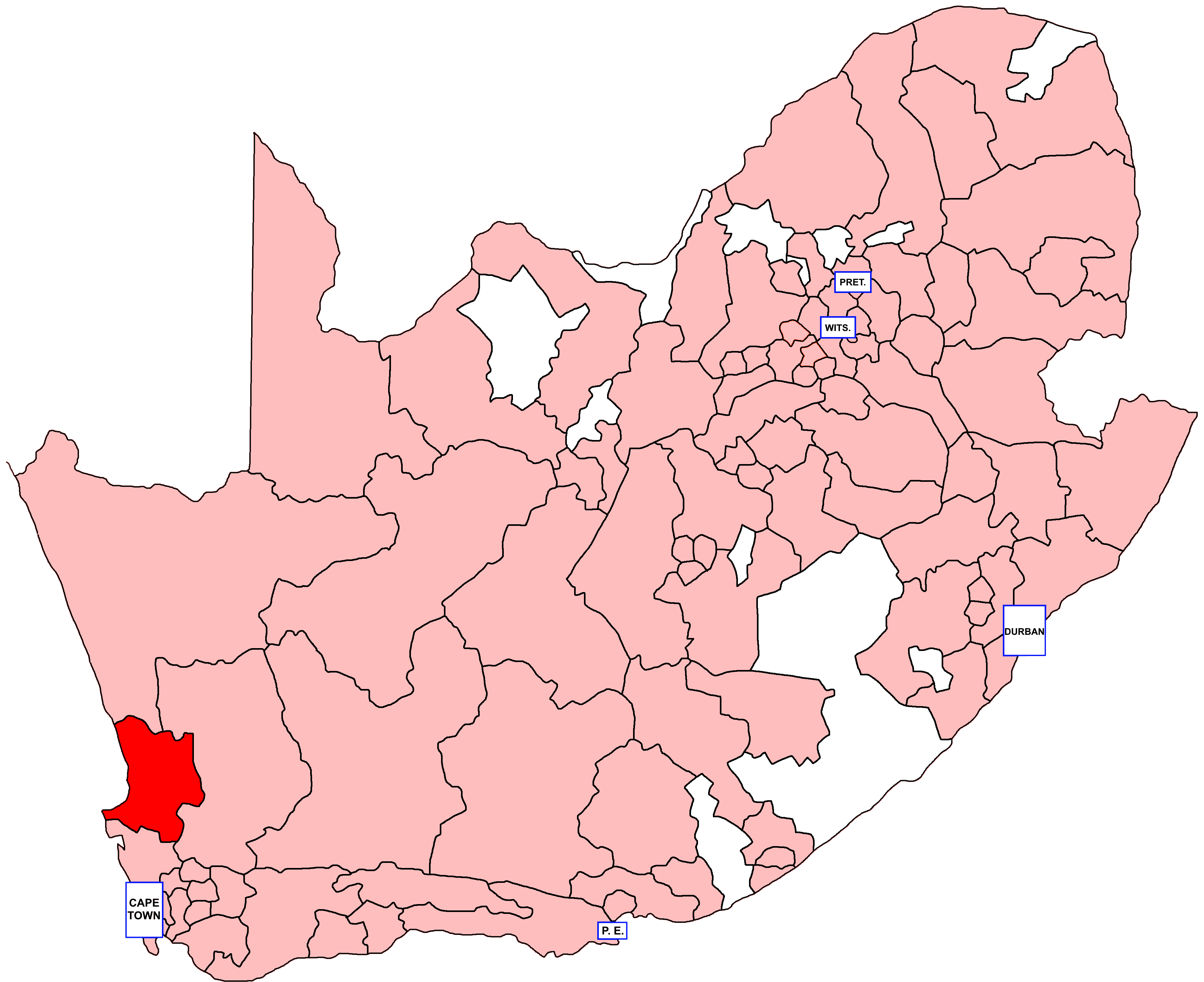
- Location of Piketberg within South Africa (1981)
- Province: Cape of Good Hope
- Electorate: 14,474 (1989)

Former constituency
- Created: 1910
- Abolished: 1994
- Number of members: 1
- Last MHA: D. J. de Villiers (NP)
- Replaced by: Western Cape

Piketberg was a constituency in the Cape Province of South Africa, which existed from 1910 to 1994. It covered a rural area centred on its namesake town and mountain range. Throughout its existence it elected one member to the House of Assembly and one to the Cape Provincial Council.

== Franchise notes ==
When the Union of South Africa was formed in 1910, the electoral qualifications in use in each pre-existing colony were kept in place. The Cape Colony had implemented a “colour-blind” franchise known as the Cape Qualified Franchise, which included all adult literate men owning more than £75 worth of property (controversially raised from £25 in 1892), and this initially remained in effect after the colony became the Cape Province. As of 1908, 22,784 out of 152,221 electors in the Cape Colony were “Native or Coloured”. Eligibility to serve in Parliament and the Provincial Council, however, was restricted to whites from 1910 onward.

The first challenge to the Cape Qualified Franchise came with the Women's Enfranchisement Act, 1930 and the Franchise Laws Amendment Act, 1931, which extended the vote to women and removed property qualifications for the white population only – non-white voters remained subject to the earlier restrictions. In 1936, the Representation of Natives Act removed all black voters from the common electoral roll and introduced three “Native Representative Members”, white MPs elected by the black voters of the province and meant to represent their interests in particular. A similar provision was made for Coloured voters with the Separate Representation of Voters Act, 1951, and although this law was challenged by the courts, it went into effect in time for the 1958 general election, which was thus held with all-white voter rolls for the first time in South African history. The all-white franchise would continue until the end of apartheid and the introduction of universal suffrage in 1994.

== History ==
Like many constituencies in the rural Cape, the electorate of Piketberg was largely Afrikaans-speaking and conservative, and with the exception of the inaugural Union election in 1910, the seat was held throughout its existence by the National Party. Its most famous MP was Daniël François Malan, who moved there from neighbouring Calvinia in 1938 and represented the seat until his retirement in 1954. Its final MP, former Springboks captain Dawid Jacobus de Villiers, served as a cabinet minister under P. W. Botha, F. W. de Klerk and Nelson Mandela.

== Members ==
Election	Member	Party
1910	Michiel Johannes de Beer	South African
1915	Jan Hendrik Hofmeyr de Waal	National
1920	Jan Hendrik Hofmeyr de Waal	National
1921	Jan Hendrik Hofmeyr de Waal	National
1924	Jan Hendrik Hofmeyr de Waal	National
1929	Jan Hendrik Hofmeyr de Waal	National
1933	Jan Hendrik Hofmeyr de Waal	National
1934	Jan Hendrik Hofmeyr de Waal	GNP
1937 by	Albertus Johannes van Zyl	GNP
1938	Daniël François Malan	GNP
1943	Daniël François Malan	HNP
1948	Daniël François Malan	HNP
1953	Daniël François Malan	National
1955 by	H. A. Rust	National
1958	H. A. Rust	National
1961	N. F. Treurnicht	National
1966	N. F. Treurnicht	National
1970	N. F. Treurnicht	National
1974	N. F. Treurnicht	National
1977	N. F. Treurnicht	National
1981	D. A. Kotze	National
1981 by	Dawid Jacobus de Villiers	National
1987	Dawid Jacobus de Villiers	National
1989	Dawid Jacobus de Villiers	National
1994	constituency abolished	

== Detailed results ==
=== Elections in the 1910s ===
General election 1910: Piketberg
Party	Candidate	Votes	%	±%
South African	Michiel Johannes de Beer	Unopposed		
South African win (new seat)				

General election 1915: Piketberg
Party	Candidate	Votes	%	±%
National	J. H. H. de Waal	1,387	56.2	New
South African	W. J. van der Merwe	1,082	43.8	N/A
Majority		305	12.4	N/A
Turnout		2,469	84.5	N/A
National gain from South African		Swing	N/A	

=== Elections in the 1920s ===
General election 1920: Piketberg
Party	Candidate	Votes	%	±%
National	J. H. H. de Waal	1,742	60.8	+4.6
South African	J. H. Hofmeyr	1,124	39.2	−4.6
Majority		618	21.6	+9.2
Turnout		2,866	79.4	−5.1
National hold		Swing	+4.6	

General election 1921: Piketberg
Party	Candidate	Votes	%	±%
National	Jan Hendrik Hofmeyr de Waal	1,684	56.3	−4.5
South African	François Allen Joubert	1,309	43.7	+4.5
Majority		618	12.6	−9.0
Turnout		2,993	80.2	+0.8
National hold		Swing	+4.5	

General election 1924: Piketberg
Party	Candidate	Votes	%	±%
National	J. H. H. de Waal	1,883	59.6	+3.3
South African	M. J. de Beer	1,249	39.5	−4.2
Rejected ballots		29	0.9	N/A
Majority		618	20.1	+7.5
Turnout		3,161	82.8	+2.6
National hold		Swing	+3.8	

General election 1929: Piketberg
Party	Candidate	Votes	%	±%
National	J. H. H. de Waal	1,894	60.8	+1.2
South African	F. T. Versfeld	1,148	36.9	−2.6
Rejected ballots		71	2.3	+1.4
Majority		746	23.9	+3.8
Turnout		3,113	86.5	+3.7
National hold		Swing	+1.9	

=== Elections in the 1930s ===
General election 1933: Piketberg
Party	Candidate	Votes	%	±%
National	J. H. H. de Waal	Unopposed		
National hold				

Piketberg by-election, 2 February 1938
Party	Candidate	Votes	%	±%
Purified National	Albertus Johannes van Zyl	3,357	75.1	N/A
Independent	P. F. Kriel	614	13.7	New
Greyshirt	Louis Theodor Weichardt	452	10.1	New
Rejected ballots		45	1.1	N/A
Majority		2,743	61.4	N/A
Turnout		4,468	67.3	N/A
Purified National hold		Swing	N/A	

General election 1938: Piketberg
Party	Candidate	Votes	%	±%
Purified National	Daniël François Malan	4,029	66.6	New
United	J. H. Loock	1,971	32.6	New
Rejected ballots		46	0.8	-1.0
Majority		2,058	34.0	N/A
Turnout		6,046	86.1	−2.2
Purified National hold		Swing	N/A	
