= Wynand Breytenbach =

South African politician (1935–2002)

Member of the National Assembly
- In office 1994–1994

House of Assembly

Assembly Member for Kroonstad
- In office 1981–1994

Personal details
- Born: Wynand Nicolas Breytenbach; 25 June 1935 Perdeberg, Orange Free State; Union of South Africa
- Died: 18 October 2002 (aged 67) Cape Town, Western Cape; Republic of South Africa
- Party: National Party

Wynand Nicolas Breytenbach (25 June 1935 – 18 October 2002) was a South African politician and a former pilot in the South African Air Force. He was Deputy Minister of Defence from 1987 to 1994.

A member of the National Party (NP) and a former mayor of Kroonstad, Breytenbach represented the Kroonstad constituency in the apartheid-era House of Assembly from 1981 to 1994. Although he was elected to the post-apartheid National Assembly in 1994, he retired later the same year.

== Early life and career ==
Breytenbach was born on 25 June 1935 in Perdeberg in the former Orange Free State. He grew up in Boshof. He was trained as a pilot in the South African Defence Force and, after his service in the air force, he worked in the civil aviation sector before launching his own aerial irrigation company, which operated mainly in the Cape Province.

== Political career ==
Breytenbach entered politics in 1972 when he was elected as a local councillor in Kroonstad. He served as the town's mayor in 1977. He later represented the Lindley constituency in the provincial council and then was elected to the House of Assembly, representing the Kroonstad constituency, in the 1981 general election. He remained in his seat until the house was disbanded upon the end of apartheid in 1994, and he also served as Deputy Minister of Defence from 1987 to 1994. He was the NP's representative on the defence sub-council of the Transitional Executive Council that was established to facilitate the democratic transition.

In the 1994 general election, he was elected to represent the NP in the new multi-racial National Assembly. He resigned later in 1994 and retired from politics.

== Personal life and death ==
Breytenbach's first wife died in 1968. He was married to his second wife, Martie, at the time of his death. He had seven children and lived in Noordhoek.

Breytenbach had a heart condition and underwent a heart transplant in 2000. In October 2002, he was admitted to the Christiaan Barnard Memorial Hospital in Cape Town, and he died there two weeks later, on 18 October 2002.
