= Jurie Mentz =

South African politician

Member of the National Assembly
- In office May 1994 – June 1999

Personal details
- Born: 1925 or 1926 (age 100–101)
- Citizenship: South Africa
- Party: Inkatha Freedom Party (since 1993); National Party (until 1993)

Jurie Hendrik Wynand Mentz is a South African politician who served in Parliament until 1999. He represented the National Party (NP) in the House of Assembly during apartheid, but in 1993 he defected to the Inkatha Freedom Party (IFP). He subsequently represented the IFP in the National Assembly from 1994 to 1999.

== Political career ==
Mentz was born in 1925 or 1926. During apartheid, he represented the NP in the House of Assembly, serving the Vryheid constituency in northern Natal province. By 1989, he was the chairman of the NP's caucus in the house.

On 28 January 1993, he announced his defection from the NP to the IFP, which he subsequently campaigned for ahead of the 1994 general election. He told the Los Angeles Times that he had defected after visiting Eastern Europe and seeing the effect of communist policies on "the people and the economy". He said:

We can't afford this experiment... People are starting to realize they must make a choice, and the black leader acceptable to them is [IFP leader] Mangosuthu Buthelezi.

In the 1994 election, Mentz was elected to a single term in an IFP seat in the new multi-racial National Assembly. He left Parliament after the 1999 general election.
