= Hendrik Schalk Theron =

South African mining engineer and politician (1869-1922)

Minister of Lands and Irrigation
- In office 1913–1915
- Prime Minister: Louis Botha
- Preceded by: Abraham Fischer
- Succeeded by: Hendrik Mentz

Personal details
- Born: 12 February 1869 Winburg, Orange Free State
- Died: 28 June 1922 (aged 53) Potchefstroom, Union of South Africa
- Party: South African Party
- Occupation: mining engineer, farmer

Military service
- Allegiance: Orange Free State
- Years of service: 1899–1902
- Rank: Commandant
- Battles/wars: Second Boer War

Hendrik Schalk Theron (12 February 1869 – 28 June 1922) was a South African mining engineer, farmer, politician and Member of Parliament.

== Early life ==
Theron was the son of Pieter Jacobus Georg Theron and his wife, Anna Christina du Plessis. He was educated at Grey College in Bloemfontein, and the Victoria College in Stellenbosch, where he obtained a B.A. degree. He then went on to study at the Royal School of Mines in London, where he qualified as a mining engineer and became an associate. In 1896 he began working in the Orange Free State civil service as a mining engineer at Koffiefontein and in 1898 he was appointed a justice of the peace and inspector of mines at Kaalvallei and the Lace Diamond Mine.

== Second Boer war ==
Theron fought in the Second Anglo-Boer war, with the rank of commandant, and during the siege of Ladysmith, he was placed in charge of the searchlights around Ladysmith. In May 1900, like a number of fellow Free Staters, he laid down his arms and in November 1901 the British military authorities deported him to a POW camp in India, where he remained until January 1903.

== Political career ==
After returning, he engaged in prospecting and during 1905, he began farming in the Hoopstad district. When self-government was granted to the Free State in 1907, he represented Hoopstad in the Legislative Assembly. In 1910 he was elected member of the House of Assembly and because of his interest in agriculture, was appointed Minister of Lands and Irrigation in General Louis Botha's cabinet of 1913. As Minister, with the portfolio of irrigation, he was instrumental in the drafting of legislation for the establishment of the Hartbeespoort Dam and irrigation scheme. He was not re-elected in 1915 and after the 1920 election, when he lost his constituency, he devoted most of his time to farming. He was one of the founders of the South African Co-operative Union and from 1921 a director of the Co-op.

Theron married Isabella Elizabeth Pistorius and three children were born of the marriage. He died in 1922 on his farm, Nooitgedacht in the district of Potchefstroom.

== See also ==
- First Cabinet of Louis Botha
