= Nicolaas Havenga =

South African politician

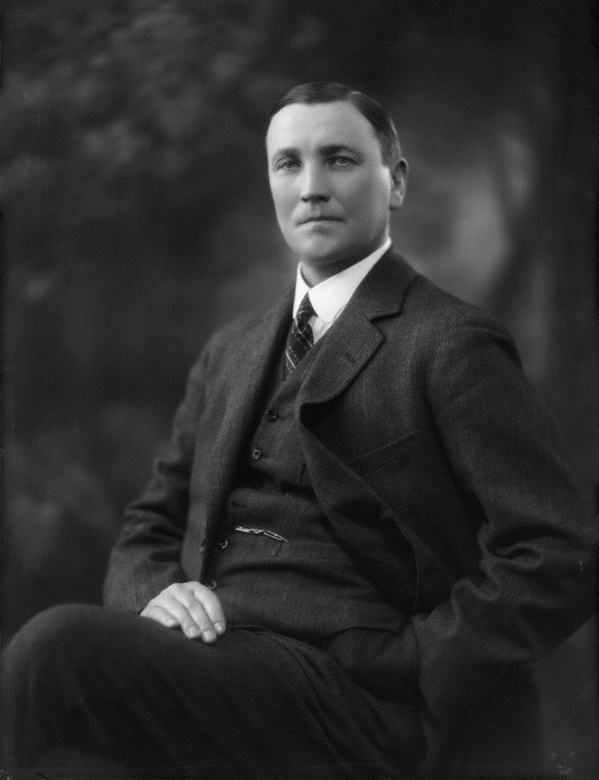

Minister of Finance
- In office 1948–1954
- Prime Minister: D. F. Malan
- Preceded by: Frederick Sturrock
- Succeeded by: Eric Louw
- In office 1929–1934
- Prime Minister: J. B. M. Hertzog
- Preceded by: Henry Burton
- Succeeded by: Jan Hendrik Hofmeyr

Member of the South African Parliament for Ladybrand
- In office 1948–1954
- Preceded by: J. J. Fourie

Member of Parliament for Fauresmith
- In office 1915–1940
- Preceded by: S. J. van der Merwe
- Succeeded by: F. W. Beyers

Personal details
- Born: 1 May 1882 Fauresmith, Orange Free State
- Died: 14 March 1957 (aged 74) Cape Town, Union of South Africa
- Party: National Party (until 1934, 1951–); United Party (1934–1941); Afrikaner Party (1941–1951)

Nicolaas Christiaan Havenga (1 May 1882 – 14 March 1957) better known as Klasie Havenga, was a South African politician who served as Finance Minister in the governments of J. B. M. Hertzog and D. F. Malan.

== Relationship with Hertzog ==
Havenga's family suffered financial hardship in his youth and as a result he was unable to attend university despite strong performances at school. His relationship with Hertzog began during the Second Boer War, when Havenga served as his private secretary and in this role was wounded several times. Following his war service he returned to study and qualified as a lawyer, whilst also joining the South African Party and representing the group in the Orange Free State provincial council from 1910. He was elected to the national parliament in the 1915 election and, after a period as a defence spokesman, soon became recognised for his financial expertise.

Havenga was a leading member of Hertzog's government and indeed with Oswald Pirow he formed the basis of Hertzog's 'inner cabinet' which controlled decision making. As Finance Minister he was responsible for the decision to take South Africa off the gold standard, one that led to a significant economic upturn. Havenga had formerly been a harsh critic of this move, reflecting populist opinions that gold-producing South Africa should refuse to follow the United Kingdom off the gold standard, supposedly as a piece of nationalist posturing against the British. In 1932 however rumours had been circulating that Tielman Roos was intending to split from the government over the issue and form a new party that would go into coalition with Jan Smuts, forcing Havenga to abandon his earlier stance to save the government.

== Afrikaner Party leader ==
A loyal supporter of Hertzog, he defected from the United Party government following its formation and later led the pro-Hertzog Afrikaner Party. Havenga led the party in the 1943 election but all of its candidates, including Havenga himself, were defeated. He had initially suggested an alliance with Malan but his opponent reasoned, correctly as it proved, that he did not need Afrikaner Party support to win the election and so rejected the offer. Havenga was not a member of the House of Assembly at the time of the election as, like Hertzog, he had resigned his seat in the body when Hertzog was rejected as leader. Havenga's 1487 votes in the Frankfort constituency was the party's best result but it was not enough to see him elected.

Before long however he was back working with Malan in an Afrikaner Party-Herenigde Nasionale Party (HNP) coalition, which succeeded in ousting Smuts in 1948, the two having formally agreed an electoral pact for their respective parties in March 1947. Malan had feared the possibility of the Afrikaner Party picking up disaffected Afrikaans voters and as such had been making overtures to Havenga since 1946. Havenga's party gained nine seats after the HNP gave them a free run in a handful of constituencies. He was elected as member for Ladybrand with a comfortable majority.

== Back in government ==
Havenga was appointed Minister of Finance yet again, serving under Malan as Prime Minister. Havenga was however not comfortable working with the HNP, especially after Malan began to suggest changing elements of the non-white franchise. As a result Havenga, through their mutual friend Dr. E.G. Malherbe, made contact with Jan Smuts, suggesting that he might be prepared to form a government with him instead. Smuts was reluctant to work with Havenga, accusing him of fascism (particularly as the Afrikaner Party had absorbed a number of former members of the pro-Nazi Ossewabrandwag) and the notion finally broke down when Malherbe suggested that the arrangement might involve Havenga as Prime Minister with Smuts playing more of a background role. After this scheme fell apart Havenga continued as Finance Minister and in this role garnered a reputation for fostering close economic co-operation with the United Kingdom, despite his earlier associations with anti-British sentiments.

Despite his earlier attempts to break the coalition, following Malan's retirement in 1954 he indicated that Havenga, whose Afrikaner Party had by then merged with the HNP, was his preferred choice of successor. However in spite of this endorsement, the extremists in the party indicated that they intended to challenge the succession, feeling that Havenga had become too moderate. Havenga lost out to Johannes Gerhardus Strijdom and spent his final years in retirement, although he did emerge to criticise Strijdom's reforms in 1955.

== See also ==
- Havenga prize

Political offices
Preceded by Henry Burton	Finance ministers of South Africa; 1924–1939	Succeeded by Jan Hendrik Hofmeyr
Preceded by Frederick Sturrock	Finance ministers of South Africa; 1948–1954	Succeeded by Eric Louw
