= D. F. Malan =

Prime Minister of South Africa from 1948 to 1954

The Right Honourable D. F. Malan PC
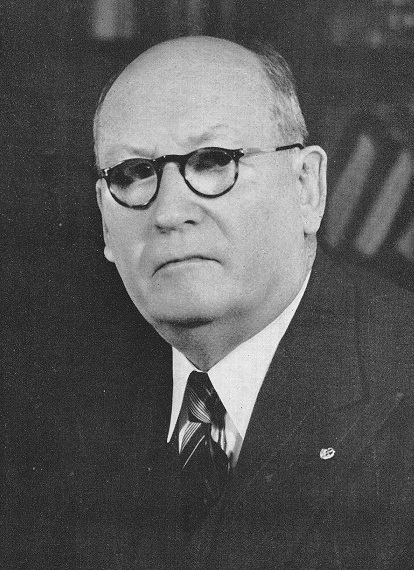

4th Prime Minister of South Africa
- In office 4 June 1948 – 30 November 1954
- Monarchs: George VI; Elizabeth II
- Governors-General: Gideon Brand van Zyl; Ernest George Jansen
- Preceded by: Jan Smuts
- Succeeded by: Johannes Strijdom

President of the National Party
- In office 1934–1953
- Preceded by: Barry Hertzog
- Succeeded by: Johannes Strijdom

Minister of the Interior, Education and Public Health
- In office 30 June 1924 – 20 May 1933
- Prime Minister: Barry Hertzog
- Preceded by: Sir Patrick Duncan
- Succeeded by: Jan Hofmeyr

Member of the House of Assembly
- In office 1919 – 30 November 1954
- Constituency: Calvinia (1918-1938); Piketberg (1938-1954)

Personal details
- Born: Daniël François Malan; 22 May 1874 Riebeek-West, Cape Colony
- Died: 7 February 1959 (aged 84) Stellenbosch, Cape Province, Union of South Africa
- Party: National (1914–1935) (1948–59); Purified National (1935–1939); Herenigde Nasionale (1940–1948)
- Spouses: Martha van Tonder (m. 1926; died 1930) Maria Louw (m. 1937)
- Children: 2 sons; 1 daughter (adopted)
- Education: University of Stellenbosch; University of Utrecht
- Profession: Clergyman, politician

Daniël François Malan PC (Afrikaans pronunciation: [ˈdɑːni.əl franˈsʋɑː mɑːˈlan]; 22 May 1874 – 7 February 1959) was a South African politician who served as the fourth prime minister of South Africa from 1948 to 1954. The National Party implemented the system of apartheid, which enforced racial segregation laws, during his tenure as prime minister.

== Early life ==
Daniël François Malan was born on 22 May 1874 in Riebeek-West in the Cape Colony. His father, who bore the same name, was a wealthy farmer and clergyman. His mother was Ana Magdalena du Toit. He was the fifth of nine children, four of whom did not survive childhood.

The progenitor of the Malan name in the South African region was a French Huguenot refugee named Jacques Malan from Provence (Mérindol), France, who arrived at the Cape before 1689. The Malan name is one of a number of Afrikaans names of French origin which have retained their original spelling. Malan's older sister, Cinie, later became a missionary and linguist.

Malan obtained a B.A. in Music and Science from Victoria College, Stellenbosch, whereafter he entered the Stellenbosch seminary in order to train as a minister in the Dutch Reformed Church. Along with his studies in theology, he obtained a M.A. in Philosophy from Victoria College, later to be the University of Stellenbosch. Malan left South Africa in 1900 to study towards a Doctorate in Divinity at the University of Utrecht, which he obtained in 1905.

== Career ==
=== Dutch Reformed Church minister ===
Malan returned to South Africa, where he was ordained as a minister of the Dutch Reformed Church and served for six months as an assistant-minister in Heidelberg, Transvaal. He was an ardent fighter for the acceptance of Afrikaans, which was an emerging language fighting against Dutch and English, and was a founding member of the Afrikaanse Taal- en Kultuurvereniging (ATKV, 'The Afrikaans Language and Cultural Society'), which was established in 1930. He was stationed in Montagu from 1906 to 1912 and thereafter in Graaff-Reinet until 1915. He also undertook a journey on behalf of the Dutch Reformed Church, visiting religious Afrikaners living in the Belgian Congo, Northern Rhodesia, and Southern Rhodesia.

=== Political career ===
Malan's involvement in National Party politics began shortly after the NP's formation in 1914. In those years, political parties had affiliated newspapers that served as their mouthpiece. However, Nationalist-minded Afrikaners in the Cape had no such outlet and therefore, in 1915, decided to found De Burger, which later became known as Die Burger. They persuaded Malan to become the editor of the new newspaper and he used it as a springboard for entry into parliament. As he was worried about the Afrikaners' political position in the aftermath of the 1914 Rebellion, he relinquished his position as a minister in the Dutch Reformed Church to accept the position. The Cape branch of the National Party was founded in 1915 and Malan was elected as its provincial leader. In 1918, he was elected to Parliament for the first time as MP for the seat of Calvinia in the House of Assembly. He held that seat until 1938 when he became the MP for Piketberg.

When the National Party came to power for the first time in 1924 under Prime Minister J. B. M. Hertzog, Malan was given the post of Minister of the Interior, Education and Public Health, which he held until 1933. In 1925, he was at the forefront of a campaign to replace Dutch with Afrikaans in the constitution and provide South Africa with a new national flag.

After the 1933 election, the United Party was formed out of the fusion of Hertzog's National Party and the rival South African Party of Jan Smuts. Malan strongly opposed this merger and, in 1934, he and 19 other MPs defected to form the Purified National Party, which he led for the next 14 years as the opposition.

Malan opposed South African participation in World War II. South Africa's participation in the conflict was unpopular among the Afrikaner population, and in 1939 that led to a split in the governing United Party. The defectors united with the National Party, dramatically strengthening Malan's political position, and he consequently defeated Smuts and the United Party in the 1948 general election.

During Malan's tenure as prime minister, South Africans lost the right of appeal from the Appellate Division of the Supreme Court of South Africa to the Judicial Committee of the Privy Council in London under the terms of the Privy Council Appeals Act, 1950.

The foundations of apartheid were firmly laid during Malan's six-and-a-half years as prime minister. On 24 February 1953, Malan was granted dictatorial powers to oppose black and Indian anti-apartheid movements. Malan resigned in 1954 at the age of 80 with the hopes of Nicolaas Havenga being appointed as the prime minister. However, Havenga was defeated by J. G. Strijdom.

== Death ==
Malan died on 7 February 1959 at Môrewag, his home in Stellenbosch, aged 84. His book, Afrikaner Volkseenheid en my ervaringe op die pad daarheen ("Afrikaner nationalism and my experiences on the road to it"), was published in the same year by Nasionale Boekhandel. A collection of his writings and documents is housed in the Document Centre at the University of Stellenbosch's J.S. Gericke Library. He is positioned 81st on the SABC3's Great South Africans list.

Political offices
Preceded by Jan Smuts	Prime Minister of South Africa; 1948–1954	Succeeded by J.G. Strijdom
