= 1943 South African general election =

- 7 July 1943

All 150 general roll seats in the House of Assembly 76 seats needed for a majority
- Registered: 1,114,110
- Turnout: 79.49% (▲0.13pp)
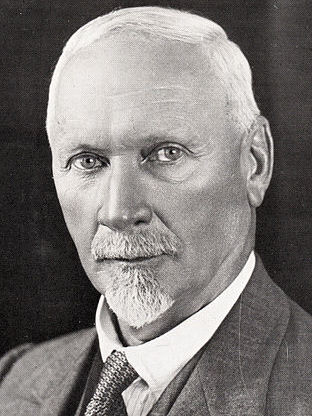

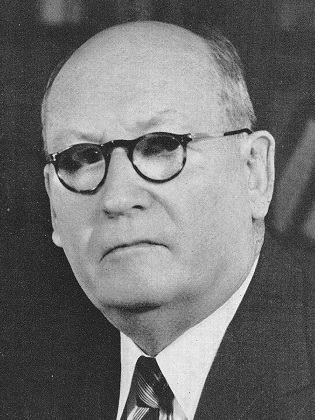

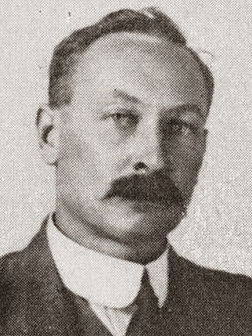

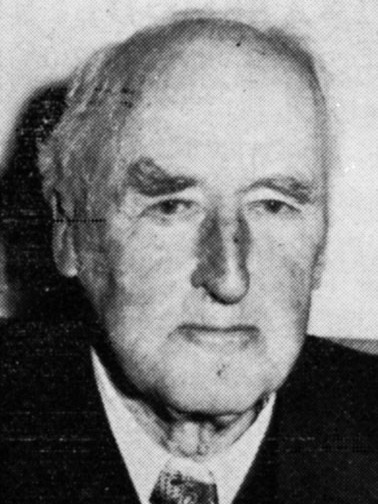
	First party	Second party
Leader	Jan Smuts	D. F. Malan
Party	United	Reunited National
Leader's seat	Standerton	Piketberg
Last election	53.81%, 111 seats	31.31%, 27 seats
Seats won	89	43
Seat change	▼22	▲16
Popular vote	435,297	321,601
Percentage	49.68%	36.70%
Swing	▼4.13pp	▲5.39pp
	Third party	Fourth party
Leader	Walter Madeley	Charles Stallard
Party	Labour	Dominion
Leader's seat	Benoni	Pietermaritzburg District
Last election	5.87%, 3 seats	6.32%, 8 seats
Seats won	9	7
Seat change	▲6	▼1
Popular vote	38,206	29,023
Percentage	4.36%	3.31%
Swing	▼1.51pp	▼3.01pp
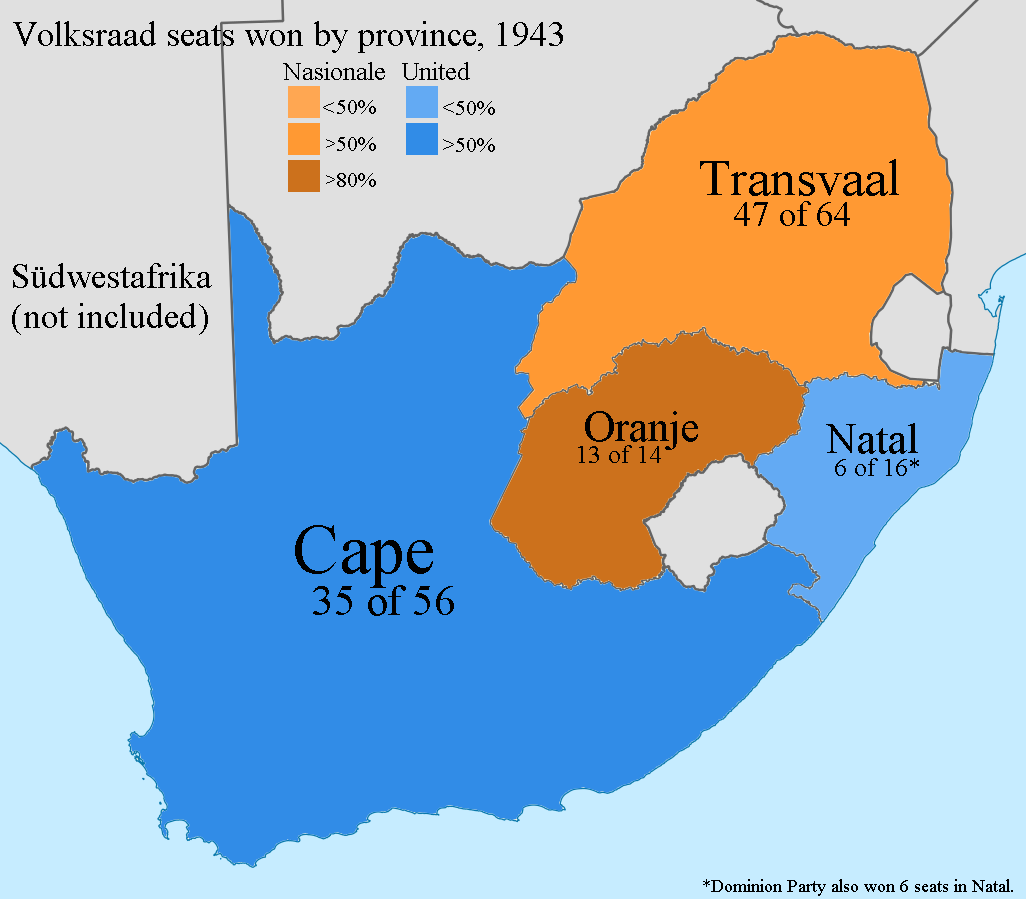
Prime Minister before election
Jan Smuts
United
Elected Prime Minister
Jan Smuts
United

General elections were held in South Africa on 7 July 1943 to elect the 150 members of the House of Assembly. The United Party of Jan Smuts won an absolute majority.

Due to a racially segregated election system and restrictive franchise requirements, the electorate consisted almost exclusively of white people (who were roughly 20% of the population). Very few people of coloured and Asian descent were allowed to vote in the election.

Although the United Party was victorious, special wartime circumstances such as soldiers on active service being allowed to vote and Smuts's status as an international statesman probably exaggerated the depth and level of attachment to the United Party.

The elections might also have understated Afrikaner support for nationalist policies, as many newly urbanised Afrikaners had not registered as voters. In addition, the infighting between the various Afrikaner political factions reduced their support during the election. However, this election was the beginning of the rise of D. F. Malan as the dominant spokesman for Afrikanerdom, which would come to fruition in the 1948 elections.

== Background ==
There were significant changes to the South African party system, during the 1938-1943 Parliament.

The United Party split in 1939, over the issue of South Africa's participation in the Second World War. The Prime Minister since 1924, General J. B. M. Hertzog, advocated neutrality. The then Deputy Prime Minister, General Jan Smuts, supported South African involvement in the war. The cabinet were evenly split on the issue, which had to be resolved by a Parliamentary vote.

Smuts won the vote in the House of Assembly. He was then called upon to form a government. A wartime coalition ministry was appointed. The Smuts cabinet included pro-war members of the United Party, as well as the leaders of the Dominion and Labour parties.

Hertzog and some of his followers left the United Party and created the People Party (VP - Volksparty). This group merged with the Purified National Party (GNP - Gesuiwerde Nasionale Party), to form the Reunited National Party (HNP - Herenigde Nasionale Party). Hertzog was the first leader of the new party, from January 1940, but later in the year Hertzog resigned after falling out with his new colleagues and some of his followers then formed the Afrikaner Party.

Another Nationalist politician and former cabinet minister, Oswald Pirow, formed the New Order. This was at first a faction within the GNP, but later became a new far right party.

== Native representative members ==
The first term of the (white) MPs elected to represent black voters, from special electoral districts in Cape Province under the Representation of Natives Act 1936, expired on 30 June 1942. These seats were not vacated by a dissolution of Parliament, so they were not contested at the 1943 general election for the 150 general roll seats.

The three representative seats were filled by elections on different dates in the second half of 1942 (19 August 1942, 26 October 1942 and 29 October 1942). Three Independent MPs were returned. The term of these members expired on 30 June 1948 (the first 30 June to fall after five years from the date of election).

== Delimitation of electoral divisions ==
The South Africa Act 1909 had provided for a delimitation commission to define the boundaries for each electoral division. The representation by province, under the eighth delimitation report of 1942, is set out in the table below. The figures in brackets are the number of electoral divisions in the previous (1937) delimitation. If there is no figure in brackets then the number was unchanged.

Provinces	Cape	Natal	Orange Free State	Transvaal	Total
Divisions	56 (59)	16	14 (15)	64 (60)	150

The above table does not include the three native representative seats in Cape Province, which were not included in the delimitation of the general roll seats under the South Africa Act 1909.

== Results ==
Party	Votes	%	Seats	+/–
United Party	435,297	49.68	89	–22
Herenigde Nasionale Party	321,601	36.70	43	+16
Labour Party	38,206	4.36	9	+6
Dominion Party	29,023	3.31	7	–1
Afrikaner Party	15,601	1.78	0	New
Socialist Party	6,350	0.72	0	–1
Independents	30,185	3.44	2	+2
Native Representative Members			3	0
Total	876,263	100.00	153	0
Valid votes	876,263	98.94		
Invalid/blank votes	9,360	1.06		
Total votes	885,623	100.00		
Registered voters/turnout	1,114,110	79.49		
Source: African Elections Database

=== By province ===
Party	Cape	Natal	Orange FS	Transvaal	Total
United Party	35	6	1	47	89
Herenigde Nasionale Party	19	0	13	11	43
Labour Party	1	2	0	6	9
Dominion Party	1	6	0	0	7
Afrikaner Party	0	0	0	0	0
Socialist Party	0	0	0	0	0
Independents	0	2	0	0	2
Total	56	16	14	64	150
Source: Keesings
