= Afrikaner Party =

1941–1951 political party in South Africa

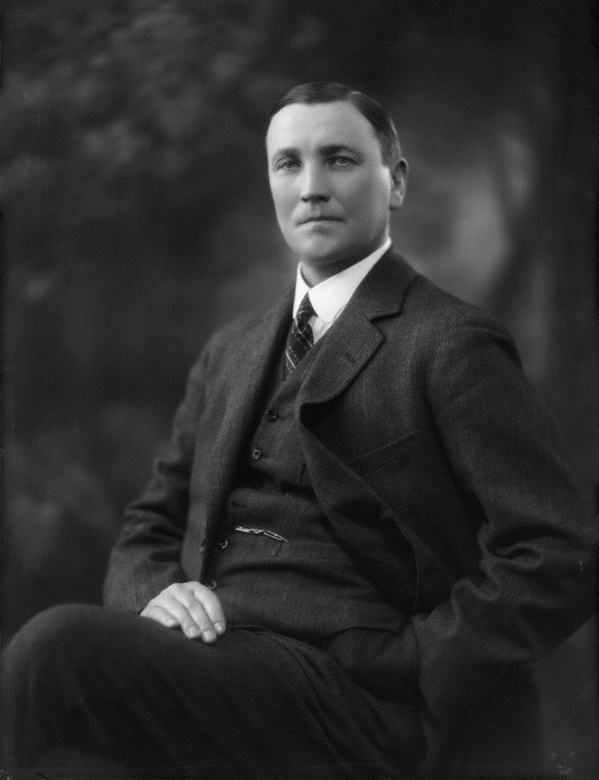
- Founder: Nicolaas Havenga
- Founded: 1941; 85 years ago
- Dissolved: 1951; 75 years ago

The Afrikaner Party (AP) was a South African political party from 1941 to 1951.

== Origins ==
The Afrikaner Party's roots can be traced back to September 1939, when South Africa declared war on Germany shortly after the start of World War II. The then Prime Minister J.B.M. Hertzog and his followers did not agree with this move and broke away from the United Party to form the Volksparty (People's Party).

The Volksparty later split: one faction joined the Gesuiwerde Nasionale Party (Purified National Party) to form the Herenigde Nasionale Party (Re-united National Party) while the other faction became the Afrikaner Party under the leadership of N.C. Havenga.

== Coalition ==
After the 1948 South African general election the Herenigde National Party and Afrikaner Party formed a coalition in order to achieve an absolute majority in parliament. The Afrikaner Party was very much the junior partner in this, however, and in 1951, the two parties amalgamated to become the National Party.

== Election results ==
National Assembly
| Election year | # of total votes | % of overall vote | # of seats won | Rank |
|---|---|---|---|---|
| 1943 | 15,607 ▲ | 1.78% ▲ | 0 | 5/6 ▲ |
| 1948 | 41,885 ▲ | 3.93% ▲ | 9 ▲ | 3/4 ▲ |
