= Reunited National Party =

1940–1951 political party in South Africa

Reunited National Party Herenigde Nasionale Party
- Abbreviation: HNP
- Leader: J. B. M. Hertzog (1940); D. F. Malan (1940–1951)
- Founded: 1940; 86 years ago
- Dissolved: 1951; 75 years ago
- Merger of: Purified National Party; Volksparty
- Merged into: National Party
- Ideology: Afrikaner nationalism; Apartheid (after 1948); Conservatism; Republicanism
- Colours: Orange , white , and blue (South African national colours)
- House of Assembly (1948): 70 / 150

Party flag

The Reunited National Party (Afrikaans: Herenigde Nasionale Party, HNP) was an Afrikaner nationalist and conservative political party in South Africa. It was founded in 1940 from the merger of the Purified National Party (Gesuiwerde Nasionale Party, GNP) led by future prime minister D. F. Malan and a faction of the United Party (UP) led by J. B. M. Hertzog, who split from the party and resigned as prime minister of South Africa in opposition to the country's support for the Allies during World War II. The HNP won a plurality of seats at the 1948 general election despite losing the popular vote to the UP and formed a coalition government with the Afrikaner Party (AP), which it merged with to form the National Party (NP) in 1951; the NP name had previously been used by the party Hertzog merged into the UP.

== History ==
=== 1933–1940: United Party split; formation of the HNP ===
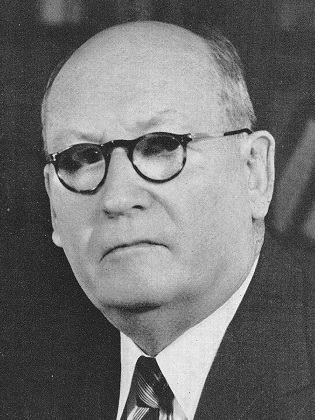
D. F. Malan

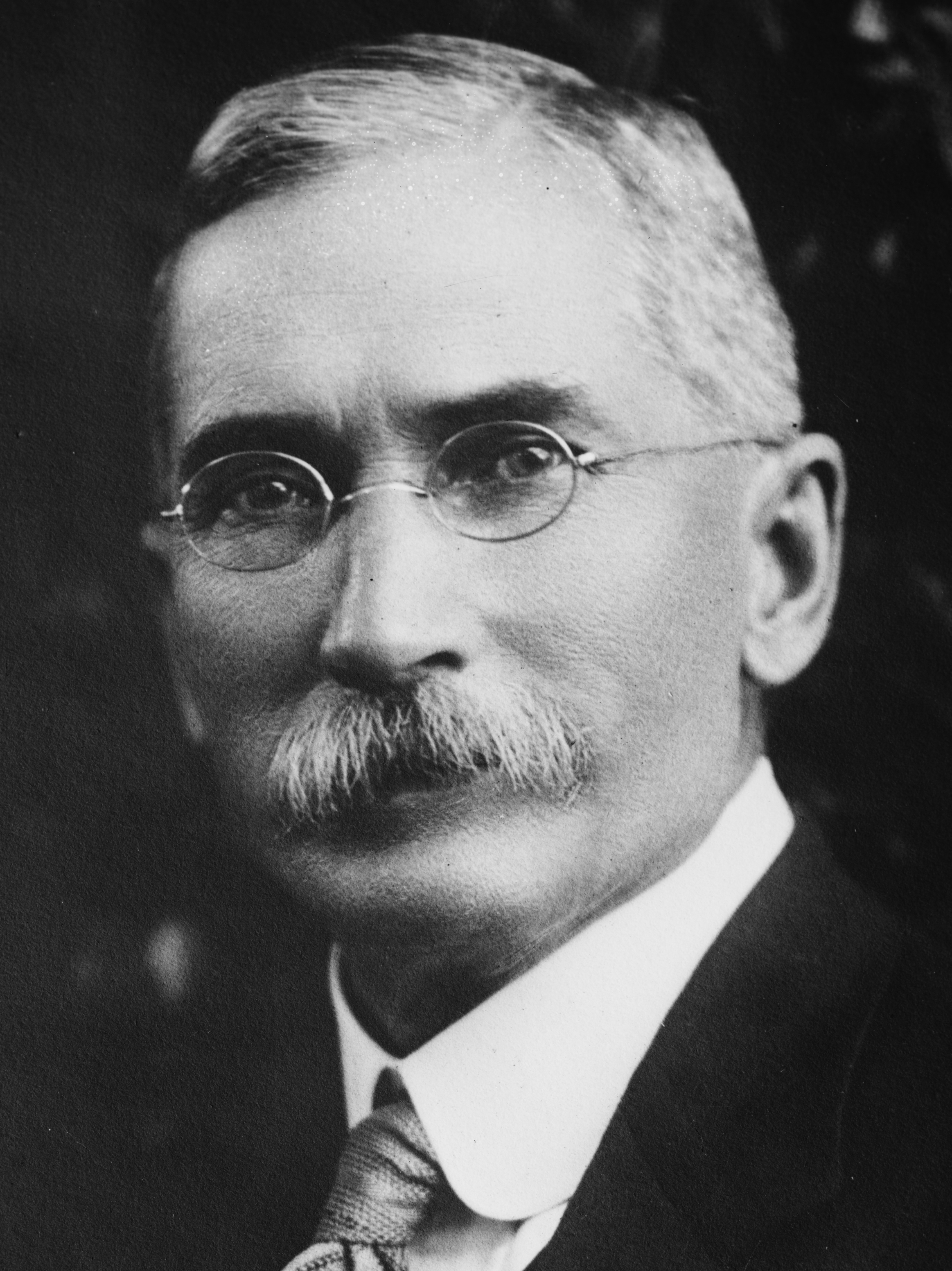
J. B. M. Hertzog

In the lead-up to the 1933 general election and amid the Great Depression in South Africa, NP prime minister Hertzog formed a broad coalition with the South African Party led by former and future prime minister Jan Smuts on 31 March. After a public movement, the parties merged into the UP on 5 December; Malan formed the GNP from National dissidents after both parties approved the merger on 31 June.

Following the Nazi invasion of Poland, the United Kingdom and France declared war against Nazi Germany on 3 September 1939, beginning World War II. This reignited the previously tense issue of neutrality in British wars, and a cabinet meeting occurred at Groote Schuur, an official residence of the prime minister, the day before the declarations of war. Hertzog and five other ministers supported continued neutrality but seven, including Smuts, supported immediate entry into the war against Germany. This was a break from the previous position of Smuts, who a year earlier had endorsed a statement by Hertzog supporting neutrality. While some Hertzog supporters criticised Smuts for failing to notify him of a position change, biographer Keith Hancock responded that Smuts had made at least twenty publicised speeches on his changing position between the statement and the war.

The House of Assembly voted on a resolution compelling the government to sever Nazi ties and abandon neutrality on 4 September; after it passed 80–67 and governor-general Patrick Duncan refused Hertzog's request to hold a snap election, the prime minister resigned on 5 September and Smuts began a second non-consecutive term to replace him the next day. The UP now led by Smuts formed a coalition with the Dominion and Labour parties. While four MPs who had been National members before the merger supported Smuts's ascension to the premiership and his cabinet contained six Afrikaners, most Afrikaners abandoned the UP after the split, triggering a major political realignment which brought South Africa closer to its pre-merger party system.

However we may regret what has occurred, there is no doubt that few other things could so quickly or effectively have consolidated Afrikaans-speaking Afrikanerdom.

— Hertzog after the UP split

After the Hertzog–Smuts union ended, the former remained divided with the GNP on the outcome of the merger; while Hertzog believed union was a good idea which only failed due to the changing position of Smuts, the GNP argued that the split proved Hertzog made a mistake in agreeing to it and expected a confession to that extent. While Hertzog maintained his stance, conciliation between Afrikaners and British South Africans lost appeal to the former group, who also supported a united Afrikaner political front. Hertzog and the GNP were also divided in their positions on republicanism; while the GNP believed that a merged party should advocate for a republic, Hertzog saw republicanism as a movement supported by many but not all Afrikaners and supported the pre-merger NP's policy of individual expression to form a united front against the UP.

On 27 January 1940 a merger agreement between the GNP and Hertzog's faction was published, forming the Herenigde Nasionale Party of Volksparty ('Reunited National Party or People's Party'). While the agreement provided for "best use" of both party manifestos until a unified one was created, it included an explicit statement supporting republicanism after a referendum, describing a republic as "the only effective guarantee that South Africa will not again be drawn into the wars of Great Britain". Despite this statement, the agreement also called for equality between Afrikaners and British South Africans and stated "Membership of the party will not be denied or refused to any national-minded Afrikaner who is prepared to subject himself to the party obligations, but who is not convinced of the desirability of establishing a republic in the existing circumstances" as a concession to Hertzog, who became parliamentary leader of the HNP.

=== 1940–1942: fracturing ===
The HNP won a by-election in the Cape Province constituency of Kuruman in 1940, flipping the seat from the UP with a majority of 803 votes.

On November 6, 1940, the Orange Free State HNP voted on competing proposals for a provincial manifesto in Bloemfontein, one prepared by Hertzog and the other by the party Federal Council. The Federal Council version supported the immediate establishment of a republic and the adoption of "Die Stem van Suid-Afrika" (which became co-official with "God Save the King" in 1938) as the sole national anthem, while failing to ensure equal status and rights for British South Africans, and the vote was seen as a vote of confidence in Hertzog's leadership of the provincial party. After Hertzog's version was overwhelmingly rejected, he abruptly announced his resignation from Free State HNP leadership and left the meeting; C. R. Swart was elected as his successor and criticised Hertzog for capitulating to British South Africans. Discussion of the incident was barred at a Transvaal meeting on December 3.

Hertzog resigned as an MP alongside Nicolaas Havenga and senator J. Brebner on 12 December, criticising the HNP for "following a course which [...] must necessarily lead to the downfall of Afrikanerdom". While MP E. A. Conroy formed the pro-Hertzog Afrikaner Party (AP) in early 1941, Hertzog had retired from politics at that point and his movement lost influence without its leader; only ten of the 38 UP MPs who supported Hertzog during the World War II vote joined Conroy's party, all of which were backbenchers. The HNP won the by-elections in Fauresmith and Smithfield triggered by Havenga and Hertzog's resignations respectively; while the UP did not contest the elections, allowing the AP to focus on opposing the HNP, AP candidates only received at most 44% of the vote.

A pro-Nazi pressure group known as the New Order, led by former defence minister Oswald Pirow, emerged within the HNP in 1941 and came to comprise a majority of the HNP MPs who were previously UP members. The group viewed Hertzog's removal from office as a conspiracy, described by writer F.S. Crafford as the result of "years of planning, concession, and compromise". American academic Newell Stultz described the New Order's goal as to "sweep away democracy and substitute a Christian, white, National-Socialist republic, separated from the British Crown and founded on the principles of state authority ('Staatsgesag') and national discipline". Malan and HNP leadership opposed the New Order for attempting to divide the HNP's members, launching a campaign against political factionism within the party. This culminated in Pirow announcing on 14 January 1942 that while the New Order would remain a part of the HNP, it would form a separate parliamentary group with 16 members, leaving only nine ex-UP MPs.

The party further faced pressure from the Ossewabrandwag (OB), an Afrikaner nationalist paramilitary and cultural organisation which threatened to supplant the HNP or remove its role by encouraging extra-parliamentary political participation. While the HNP and OB signed an agreement on 30 October 1940 that the two entities would not "interfere or meddle with the affairs or in the domain of the other", they returned to conflict soon after due to conflicting views of the HNP's domain, which the party claimed to be all political affairs but the OB claimed to only be party politics, which Stultz described as "an imprecise conception approximately meaning the scope and workings of the parliamentary system". The HNP and OB finally broke on 3 July 1941 after the latter distributed a letter on a proposed republican constitution; after attempts to bring the group under the party's control failed, Malan ordered all HNP members to resign from the OB on 3 October.

In an attempt to reaffirm the HNP's commitment to republicanism amid its conflict with the OB, Malan published the full constitution which had been summarised in the OB's letter on 23 January 1942. Stultz described the constitution as "authoritarian and reactionary" and added, citing author William H. Vatcher, that the constitution surprised British South Africans and likely also moderate Afrikaners.

=== 1943 election ===
Results of the 1943 general election: Labour (9) United (89) / Dominion (7) HNP (43); Inds. (2)/Native reps. (3)

In early 1943 OB commander Johannes Van Rensburg sent letters to Malan, Pirow, and Havenga – who had become the leader of the AP – offering an electoral pact for the general election scheduled later that year where "[i]n each constituency in which the party organizations of Afrikanerdom agree to put forward a mutually acceptable Volk candidate, such candidate will be assured not only of the votes but also of the organizational support of the Ossewa-Brandwag" while expressing its disinterest in participating in the election. While Havenga and Pirow agreed, Malan ignored the offer, thus preventing the pact and causing the OB to withdraw from the election. The New Order also withdrew from the election on 30 March, seeking to reduce division within the Afrikaner nationalist movement, and vowing to "exert all its strength unconditionally against General [Jan] Smuts and Communism".

The AP also sought a pact with the HNP, in which all eight AP incumbents would be supported by the HNP in exchange for the AP supporting other HNP candidates, and negotiations took place between Havenga and Malan in Cape Town during mid-April. The HNP declined the offer due to the AP's seats being likely to flip, Havenga not promising to cooperate with the HNP after the election, and not needing the AP's support in the seats they contested.

On 15 May, Smuts announced that the election would be held on 7 July. While Malan protested Smuts's decision to hold the election before it was expected to be held in August, most parties including the HNP had already began campaigning and the HNP released a political manifesto on 15 June. On 14 June, the HNP nominated candidates in 110 of 150 constituencies, while the AP nominated 24. 12 independent Volkseenheid ('Volk Unity') candidates also ran in the Transvaal province; while the candidates were not formally aligned with each other, Stultz remarked that "they did appear to represent in common a desire for the achievement of a united front of 'national-minded' Afrikaners outside the HNP, and they did receive some support from the Afrikaner Party, the OB, and the New Order". Five Volkseenheid candidates later withdrew amid HNP pressure but remained on the ballot.

The HNP's election manifesto focused on criticising other Afrikaner nationalist groups – which it described as "the wreckers of Afrikanerdom" – over the incumbent government. It also supported republicanism, maintaining "white civilization", and equal rights for British South Africans; the latter point was an attempt to counter AP and UP accusations that the party exclusively supported Afrikaner rights. Regarding World War II, the party's previous position of neutrality lost appeal after Operation Barbarossa failed and Axis forces were removed from northern Africa with South African support; while Malan continued to support withdrawal from the war, he did not guarantee peace with Germany and attempted to appeal to soldiers by stating that his party had "always honoured the soldier, whatever his political convictions may be, who offers his life for his country" and promising to pay pensions to white soldiers.

The results of the election were not known until the end of July due to soldier vote counting. The UP won an increased majority with 89 of 150 seats, while the HNP won 43, an increase of three, and received 321,601 (36.70%) votes. Eight seats were flipped from the HNP to UP, while two went the other way, all eight AP seats flipped to the HNP, and the HNP won six New Order seats. As most HNP gains were from other opposition parties, the broader "antiwar coalition" of the AP, HNP, and New Order lost 23 seats. The governing coalition won all but three of the 68 urban constituencies and 42 of 82 rural ones and only a quarter of Afrikaners who supported the UP in the 1938 election voted against them in 1943. Stultz remarked that the UP was aided by vote splitting – estimating that four Transvaal seats would have been won by the HNP if not for a divided opposition – and some Afrikaners abstaining from the election, citing HNP increases greater than UP losses in later by-elections. Turnout also averaged 303 lower in HNP-won constituencies than government-won ones; 303 more HNP votes in the latter seats would have flipped six and placed 25 within a thousand-vote margin.

Meanwhile, Malan observed that the "one satisfactory aspect of this election" was that "the Opposition is once again one consolidated whole."

— Stultz on the aftermath of the election

Despite its losses, the election positioned the HNP as the only viable opposition to the government. The HNP also won 31.9% of the popular vote in the Witwatersrand, an Transvaal urban area including Johannesburg, a 8.3% increase from the GNP in 1938. While it only won one of 23 seats in the area, it came within 840 votes in five, which were considered the most vulnerable government seats in the Transvaal.

=== 1944–1947: consolidation and moderation ===
After the 1943 results, the HNP shifted its focus from other Afrikaner nationalist movements to Smuts's UP, attempting to follow a more moderate course to win over former UP voters. While it was apparent to the New Order and OB that reconciliation with Malan was necessary for survival, Malan did not wish to cooperate with them. Pirow proposed a pact between the opposition groups three months after the election, which was ignored by the HNP. He further approached the party in the next year, promising unconditional electoral support to the HNP if the pact were accepted. As Malan had little to gain from the agreement, it remained rejected, and the New Order was forced into being a fringe movement in South African politics, although it officially remained a part of the HNP.

While the OB remained as a threat to the HNP, an April 1944 by-election in Wakkerstroom showed that individual OB members were willing to disobey Van Rensburg's orders and support the HNP. This by-election initially presented a chance for reconciliation between the two parties, but the HNP's tone shifted after F. E. Mentz – the MP for Westdene and a HNP figure in the Witwatersrand – was abducted and beaten by six men who were suspected to be OB members on 20 July. On Malan's request, the HNP Federal Council declared that OB membership was incompatible with the HNP on 21 September, and anyone who did not leave the OB would be expelled from the party.

While the impact of the HNP's declaration is unclear, the OB was in steep decline by the May 1945 German surrender in World War II; by the beginning of 1947, the group had little organisation and the liberal Rand Daily Mail reported a membership of no more than 800. Amid this decline in early 1945, the OB mirrored Pirow by advocating for a united opposition parliamentary front. Malan declined, believing that it would force the HNP to recognise the OB as an independent force, and Havenga and Pirow joined him soon after. With a pact declined, the OB's only viable survival path was waiting for a more favourable environment.

The AP fell dormant after the 1943 election and Malan appealed to its members while attempting to moderate the party. After the AP announced in August that it would not stand any candidates in the upcoming provincial elections, Malan said that his party "extended their hand" to AP members, an invitation seconded by Swart. Some AP members saw rejoining the HNP as the only alternative to the UP – which may have also planned to cooperate with the AP – and many members likely switched, as the party did not run any candidates or hold a party congress for the next two years.

The AP's dormancy ended by January 1946, when all party branches were ordered to reassemble and Havenga stated his commitment to the party. The party's return demonstrated that a moderate movement positioned between the UP and HNP was still feasible, and Havenga believed it would grow after the war. Agreeing with this view, Malan saw the AP as kingmaker and believed that neither him nor Smuts would win the next election without their support. As a merger attempt failed in early 1946, the HNP attempted to launch exploratory talks on an electoral pact with the AP later in the year, which Havenga ignored. He stated at the November AP congress that talks failed because the HNP did not agree to equal rights for Afrikaners and British South Africans but he remained open to cooperation with any group that supported "Hertzogite principles".

The two leaders expressed their hope that thereby "our so much desired national unity will once again be established on a firm and lasting foundation, and that all differences which arose as a result of the war or other circumstances will be buried and forgotten for all time."

— Stultz on the March 1947 joint statement by Malan and Havenga

After his attempts to form a pact with the UP failed, Havenga returned to talks with the HNP in March 1947. On 21 March, the AP leader and Malan published a joint statement that as their parties had "no difference in principle or in general policy", they may work together to oust Smuts. The leaders called for a united anti-Smuts front and to restore national unity. They began a series of 25 joint political rallies across the Transvaal on 10 June in Potgietersrus, which was the first time they campaigned together in 15 years.

The AP–HNP agreement again presented an opportunity for rapprochement with the OB, who had been allies of the AP. Nationalist newspaper Die Transvaler called for the OB to dissolve itself two days after the joint statement, while Die Burger believed it should join the New Order in unconditionally supporting Havenga and Malan. As Van Rensburg rejected these calls, Malan attempted to reintegrate the organisation's members while minimising the influence of its leadership. The Cape Province and Transvaal HNP branches both reallowed OB members to join the party, their respective conditions being that members renounce Nazism and that the OB committed to democracy. OB members were not allowed to hold HNP offices or stand as a parliamentary candidate for either party.

=== 1948–1951 ===
The Herenigde Nasionale Party gained popularity after the war and unexpectedly won the elections of 1948 with a majority of seats but a significant minority of the popular vote. Internationally it is known for the implementation of apartheid. After 1948, the HNP merged with the Afrikaner Party, another Afrikaner nationalist party led by one of Hertzog's protégés, and reverted to the short name, the Nasionale Party (National Party), which it retained until shortly after the fall of apartheid during the 1990s.

The initials of the Herenigde Nasionale Party, HNP, were later used by a breakaway party that was established in 1969, the rightwing Herstigte Nasionale Party (Re-established National Party).

== Election results ==
Election	Party leader	Votes	%	Seats	+/–	Position	Result
1943 general	D. F. Malan	321,601	36.70%	43 / 150	▲3 (Note: Change from the seat count when the House of Assembly was dissolved)	2nd	Opposition
1948 general	D. F. Malan	401,834	37.70%	70 / 150	▲27	▲1st	AP–HNP coalition
