= 1948 South African general election =

Election of the Herenigde Nasionale Party to government

- 26 May 1948

All 150 general roll seats in the House of Assembly 76 seats needed for a majority
- Registered: 1,337,534
- Turnout: 80.25% (▲0.76pp)
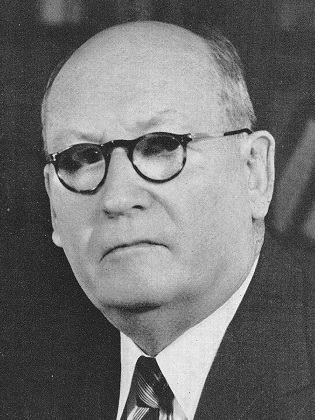

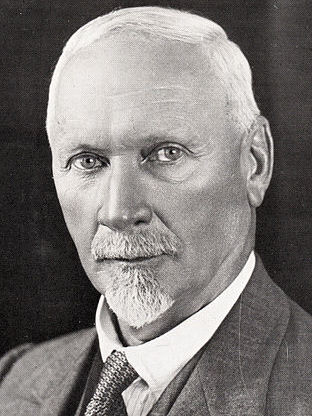

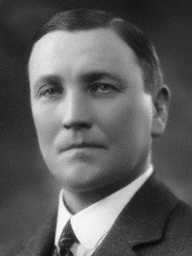
	First party	Second party
Leader	D. F. Malan	Jan Smuts
Party	Reunited National	United
Leader's seat	Piketberg	Standerton (lost re-election)
Last election	36.70%, 43 seats	49.68%, 89 seats
Seats won	70	65
Seat change	▲27	▼24
Popular vote	401,834	524,230
Percentage	37.70%	49.18%
Swing	▲1.00pp	▼0.50pp
	Third party	Fourth party
		Lab
Leader	Nicolaas Havenga	John Christie
Party	Afrikaner	Labour
Leader's seat	Ladybrand	Johannesburg City
Last election	1.78%, 0 seats	4.36%, 9 seats
Seats won	9	6
Seat change	▲9	▼3
Popular vote	41,885	27,360
Percentage	3.93%	2.57%
Swing	▲2.15pp	▼1.79pp
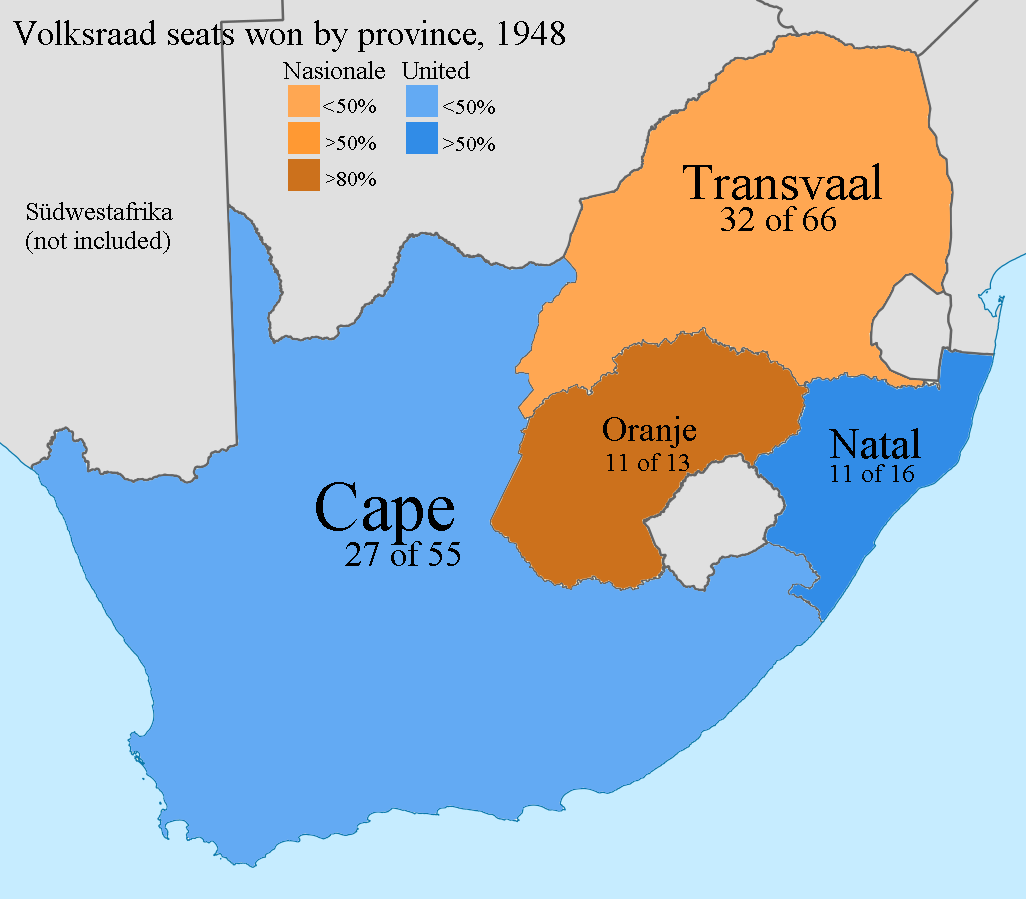
Prime Minister before election
Jan Smuts
United
Elected Prime Minister
D. F. Malan
Reunited National

General elections were held in South Africa on 26 May 1948. They represented a major turning point in the country's history, as despite receiving just under half of the votes cast, the United Party and its leader, incumbent Prime Minister Jan Smuts, were ousted by the Herenigde Nasionale Party (HNP) led by D. F. Malan, a Dutch Reformed cleric.

Due to a racially segregated election system and restrictive franchise requirements, the electorate consisted almost exclusively of white people (who were roughly 20% of the population). Very few Colored people and of Asian descent were allowed to vote in this election. Indigenous Africans had been banned altogether since the late 1930s, with the limited number of Indigenous Africans meeting electoral qualifications voting for seven "own" white MPs separately. During the election campaign, both the UP and the HNP formed coalitions with smaller parties. The UP was aligned with the left-leaning Labour Party, while the Afrikaner Party sought to advance Afrikaner rights by allying with the HNP.

The HNP capitalised on the fears of many White South Africans who felt threatened by black political aspirations, pledging to enforce strict racial segregation in all areas of life. The party called this system "apartheid" (meaning "apartness" or "separation") and promised safety and security from supposed black-on-white crime. In contrast, the United Party offered only vague ideas of gradual racial integration. Widespread white dissatisfaction with post-war domestic and economic conditions, the HNP's stronger organisation, and electoral malapportionment that favoured rural areas where the HNP enjoyed greater support, all contributed to the UP's electoral difficulties.

The elections marked the start of 46 years of National Party (NP) rule in South Africa, leading to the formal introduction of apartheid and the gradual development of a herrenvolk democracy that persisted until the 1994 election.

== Results ==
Together, the HNP and the Afrikaner Party won 79 seats in the House of Assembly against a combined total of 71 won by the UP and the Labour Party. As a result of the first-past-the-post system, the HNP won more seats, even though the UP received over eleven per cent more votes. The nationalist coalition subsequently formed a new government and ushered in the era of formal, legally binding apartheid. In 1951, the HNP and the Afrikaner Party merged, returning to the name National Party (NP).

Party	Votes	%	Seats	+/–
United Party	524,230	49.18	65	–24
Herenigde Nasionale Party	401,834	37.70	70	+27
Afrikaner Party	41,885	3.93	9	+9
Labour Party	27,360	2.57	6	–3
Independents	70,662	6.63	0	–2
Native Representative Members			3	0
Total	1,065,971	100.00	153	0
Valid votes	1,065,971	99.31		
Invalid/blank votes	7,393	0.69		
Total votes	1,073,364	100.00		
Registered voters/turnout	1,337,534	80.25		
Source: African Elections Database

=== By province ===
Party	Natal	Transvaal	Cape	Orange Free State	Total
Herenigde Nasionale Party	1	32	26	11	70
United Party	11	26	27	1	65
Afrikaner Party	2	4	2	1	9
Labour Party	2	4	0	0	6
Source: White

== Reasons for the National Party victory ==
The most important reason for the National Party's (NP) election success was, arguably, its strength with rural voters in 1948. Despite not receiving the majority vote and Smuts gaining 12% more votes, Malan benefited heavily from malapportionment. This allowed Malan to form a government by winning many small constituencies and gaining 5 more seats than the United Party in a narrow victory for the National Party.

Race, though, was one of the central policy issues facing the white electorate. The United Party (UP) and the NP presented voters with differing responses to racial integration in South Africa. Smuts and his followers favoured a pragmatic approach, arguing that racial integration was inevitable and that the government should thus relax regulations which sought to prevent black people from moving into urban areas. Whilst still advocating white dominance, the UP argued in favour of gradually reforming the political system so that black South Africans could, at some unspecified point in the future, exercise some sort of power in a racially integrated South Africa. In contrast to this nebulous position, the HNP advocated a strictly enforced racial segregation and the total disempowerment of black South Africans. There was a growing fear amongst Nationalist Afrikaners of black people taking their jobs, especially post-World War II. Rural to urban movement by blacks was to be discouraged. The UP position was supported by the Fagan Commission while the Sauer Commission informed the HNP's stance.

Another reason for D.F. Malan's success was the National Party's constant portrayal of Jan Smuts as similar to the British, a poisonous likening for many in the electorate. Leading the UP, Smuts proposed more liberal policies, more out of necessity than morality, to be elected. However, the NP likened him to the 'enemy' (Britain), a potent smear for Afrikaner voters who nursed a hatred of the British after the Second Boer War (a war then within the living memory of a third of white South Africans). Smuts's work for Britain and his decision to help Britain in World War II gave substance to the accusation.

=== Economic reasons ===
The apartheid policy proposed by the HNP was to serve the economic interests of certain white South Africans. Farmers from the northern portions of the country relied on cheap black labour to maximise profits while working-class whites living in urban areas feared the employment competition that would follow an urban influx of black South Africans. Many commercial and financial Afrikaner interests based on agriculture saw the value of apartheid in promoting growth in this sector. The UP failed to realise the enormous economic benefits of apartheid to these large and influential groups and did not prioritise segregation as much as the HNP.

Smuts and his cabinet were blamed for many of the hardships that occurred as a result of South Africa's participation in World War II. During the war, petrol was rationed by means of coupons, and bakeries were ordered not to bake white bread so as to conserve wheat. After the war, some of these measures continued, as South Africa exported food and other necessaries to Britain and the Netherlands. South Africa even provided Britain with a loan of 4 million ounces (110 metric tons) of gold. These measures caused local shortages of meat and the unavailability of white bread. The Smuts government was blamed for this, as well as for the rate of inflation and the government's dismal housing record. All these factors provided ammunition for the HNP.

=== Race and ethnicity ===
As regards election tactics, the HNP was extremely adroit at exploiting white fears while campaigning in the 1948 election. Because the UP had seemed to take a fairly lukewarm stance towards both integration and segregation, the HNP was able to argue that a victory for the UP would ultimately lead to a black government in South Africa. HNP propaganda linked black political power to communism and socialism, anathema to many white South Africans at the time. Slogans such as "Swart Gevaar" ("Black Danger"), "Rooi Gevaar" ("Red Peril"), "Die kaffer op sy plek" ("The Kaffir in his place"), and "Die koelies uit die land" ("The coolies out of the country") played upon and amplified white anxieties. Much was made of the fact that Smuts had developed a good working relationship with Joseph Stalin during World War II, when South Africa and the USSR were allies in the fight against Nazi Germany. Smuts had once remarked that he "doffs his cap to Stalin" and the HNP presented this remark as proof of Smuts's latent communist and socialist tendencies.

The Smuts government's controversial immigration program served to further inflame Afrikaner disquiet. Under this program, numerous British immigrants had moved to South Africa and were perceived to have taken homes and employment away from (white) South African citizens. Moreover, it was claimed that the intention behind such plans was to swamp the Afrikaners, who had a higher birth rate than the British diaspora, with British immigrants so that Afrikaners would be outnumbered at the polls in future elections.

=== Republicanism ===
In preparation for the 1948 election, the HNP moderated its stance on republicanism. Because of the immense and abiding national trauma, caused by the Anglo-Boer War, transforming South Africa into a republic and dissolving all ties between South Africa and the United Kingdom had been an important mission for earlier incarnations of the HNP. English speaking South Africans tended to favour a close relationship with the UK, and so the republican project became a source of conflict between the two largest white groups in South Africa. A staunchly pro-republic stance alienated moderate Afrikaners who had supported South Africa's participation in World War II and wished to achieve reconciliation between their own people and English speakers. When the HNP agreed to compromise its fiercely republican standpoint, conceding that South Africa should remain a Dominion in the Commonwealth, many Afrikaner UP supporters switched allegiance.

=== Rural/urban vote weighting ===
Demarcation of electoral district boundaries favoured the HNP. Most of the 70 seats won by the National Party during the 1948 election were in rural areas, whereas most of the 65 seats won by the United Party were in the urban areas. According to the Constitution that South Africa had adopted in 1910, rural constituencies could have up to 30% fewer voters than urban ones, tilting the balance of power in favor of rural voters, which were a core constituency of the National Party. As a result, the average number of votes to win a seat was over 9,000 for the UP compared to just over 5,600 for the NP. Despite winning 140,000 fewer votes than the UP, the NP coalition gained a plurality of seats in Parliament, and was able to form a majority government in coalition with the Afrikaner Party. It has been calculated that if rural and urban votes had been of equal value, the UP would have won 80 seats, the HNP/AP 60 seats, and other parties the remaining seats, thus giving the UP a majority outright and perhaps delaying or preventing apartheid from taking place.

=== Political organisation ===
The UP at the time has been characterised as cumbersome and lacking vigor while the HNP displayed energy and superior organizational skills. World War II had a bonding effect on the UP and white South Africans generally. Once this external uniting force fell away, Smuts lost a great deal of control over the UP as more and more voters considered alternatives to his tired regime; humiliatingly, the Prime Minister lost his parliamentary seat (Standerton) to an HNP challenger. Smuts and his party proved unable to counter the many grievances raised by the HNP in an effective way, and this inability led to the narrow HNP victory.

For its part, the National Party had largely fended off internal schisms between the party's Afrikaner Broederbond-aligned wing and those who were former members of the Ossewabrandwag. Future Prime Ministers Hendrik Verwoerd and B.J. Vorster stood in the 1948 election in the constituencies of Alberton and Brakpan, respectively, both narrowly losing in part due to right-wing factionalization.

After the 1948 election, the ruling coalition succeeded in fully enfranchising the mostly Afrikaans- and German-speaking voters in South West Africa, later known as Namibia upon independence in 1990; the region's six constituencies predominantly returned National Party MPs, strengthening the party's parliamentary majority.
