= Malherbe =

Malherbe may refer to:

== People ==
- Malherbe (surname)
  - François de Malherbe (1555-1628), French poet, reformer of French language
  - Hubert de Malherbe (1964), French designer, retail scenographer, author, and business owner

== Places ==
=== France ===
- La Haye-Malherbe, municipality of Eure
- Malherbe-sur-Ajon, new municipality of Calvados
  - Saint-Agnan-le-Malherbe, a delegated district
- Neuilly-le-Malherbe, former municipality of Calvados merged in 1972 into Vacognes-Neuilly
- Crêt Malherbe, culminating point (946 m) of the Monts du Lyonnais
- Pointe de Malherbe, rocky cape on the Var coast

=== England ===
- Boughton Malherbe, civil parish of Kent
- Cricket Malherbie, village of Knowle St Giles, civil parish of Somerset

=== Algeria ===
- Aghlal, town of the district of Aïn Témouchent, formerly named De Malherbe

=== Space ===
- 260724 Malherbe, asteroid

== Science and literature ==
- Malherbe's parakeet, species of parakeet
- Pilomatricoma, also known as a calcifying epithelioma of Malherbe
- Prix Henry Malherbe, French literary prize

== Other uses ==
- Lycée Malherbe, a secondary school in Caen, France
  - Stade Malherbe Caen, a sporting club originating from the lycée
- Château de Malherbes, château and vineyard in Latresne, Gironde, France
