= Wonderboom (House of Assembly of South Africa constituency) =

South African constituency, 1915–1994

- Former constituency for the South African House of Assembly
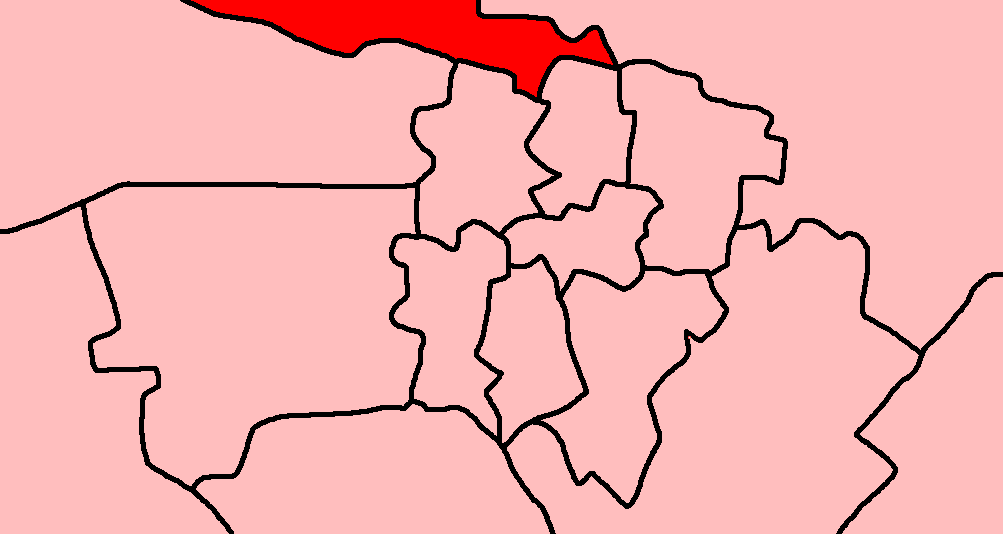
- Location of Wonderboom within Pretoria (1981)
- Province: Transvaal
- Electorate: 30,107 (1989)

Former constituency
- Created: 1915
- Abolished: 1994
- Number of members: 1
- Last MHA: J. J. C. Botha (NP)
- Replaced by: Gauteng

Wonderboom was a constituency in the Transvaal Province of South Africa, which existed from 1920 to 1994. It covered an area in the northern suburbs of Pretoria, the administrative capital of South Africa, centred on the suburb of Wonderboom. Throughout its existence it elected one member to the House of Assembly and one to the Transvaal Provincial Council.

== Franchise notes ==
When the Union of South Africa was formed in 1910, the electoral qualifications in use in each pre-existing colony were kept in place. In the Transvaal Colony, and its predecessor the South African Republic, the vote was restricted to white men, and as such, elections in the Transvaal Province were held on a whites-only franchise from the beginning. The franchise was also restricted by property and education qualifications until the 1933 general election, following the passage of the Women's Enfranchisement Act, 1930 and the Franchise Laws Amendment Act, 1931. From then on, the franchise was given to all white citizens aged 21 or over. Non-whites remained disenfranchised until the end of apartheid and the introduction of universal suffrage in 1994.

== History ==
Wonderboom was first created in 1920, as part of a general increase in representation for the Transvaal. Unlike the three pre-existing Pretoria seats, it was a safe seat for the National Party, which held it almost throughout its existence. In a 1933 by-election, it became the first South African constituency to elect a female MP, Mabel Malherbe, in a contested election - Leila Reitz had won Parktown in the general election earlier that year, but she was unopposed.

Two of its MPs served in cabinet: M. D. C. de Wet Nel, who held various positions under J. G. Strijdom and Hendrik Verwoerd, and Pik Botha, who represented the seat early in his career and later became Foreign Minister under P. W. Botha and F. W. de Klerk. Its last few MPs faced stiff challenges from the Conservative Party, but the NP held the seat until the end of apartheid, by which time it was one of the biggest constituencies in South Africa with more than 30,000 electors.

== Members ==
Election	Member	Party
1920	B. J. Pienaar	National
1921	B. J. Pienaar	National
1924	B. J. Pienaar	National
1929	H. D. van Broekhuizen	National
1933	H. D. van Broekhuizen	National
1933 by	Mabel Malherbe	National
1934	Mabel Malherbe	United
1938	J. A. P. Venter	United
1943	M. D. C. de W. Nel	HNP
1948	M. D. C. de W. Nel	HNP
1953	M. D. C. de W. Nel	National
1958	M. D. C. de W. Nel	National
1961	M. D. C. de W. Nel	National
1966	W. T. Marais	National
1970	Pik Botha	National
1974	Pik Botha	National
1975 by	D. W. Steyn	National
1977	D. W. Steyn	National
1981	D. W. Steyn	National
1987	D. W. Steyn	National
1989	J. J. C. Botha	National
1994	constituency abolished	

== Detailed results ==
=== Elections in the 1920s ===
General election 1920: Wonderboom
Party	Candidate	Votes	%	±%
National	B. J. Pienaar	1,213	57.7	New
South African	J. F. Ludorf	590	28.0	New
Labour	J. E. Riley	301	14.3	New
Majority		623	29.7	N/A
Turnout		2,104	69.2	N/A
National win (new seat)				

General election 1921: Wonderboom
Party	Candidate	Votes	%	±%
National	B. J. Pienaar	1,410	68.6	+10.9
South African	I. N. van Alphen	645	31.4	+3.4
Majority		765	37.2	+7.5
Turnout		2,055	63.7	−5.5
National hold		Swing	+3.8	

General election 1924: Wonderboom
Party	Candidate	Votes	%	±%
National	B. J. Pienaar	1,672	73.3	+4.7
South African	F. L. Leipoldt	602	26.4	−5.0
Rejected ballots		8	0.3	N/A
Majority		1,070	46.9	+9.7
Turnout		2,282	74.0	+10.3
National hold		Swing	+4.9	

General election 1929: Wonderboom
Party	Candidate	Votes	%	±%
National	H. D. van Broekhuizen	1,350	65.7	−7.6
South African	A. H. W. Luderitz	670	32.6	+6.2
Rejected ballots		36	1.7	+0.6
Majority		1,070	33.1	−13.8
Turnout		2,056	78.3	+4.3
National hold		Swing	-6.9	

=== Elections in the 1930s ===
General election 1933: Wonderboom
Party	Candidate	Votes	%	±%
National	H. D. van Broekhuizen	2,407	53.4	−12.3
Independent	P. A. Taljaard	1,527	33.9	New
Roos	E. Roux	528	11.7	New
Rejected ballots		49	1.0	-0.7
Majority		880	19.5	N/A
Turnout		4,511	67.6	−10.7
National hold		Swing	N/A	

Wonderboom by-election, 23 August 1933
Party	Candidate	Votes	%	±%
National	Mabel Malherbe	1,969	51.7	−1.7
Independent	P. A. Taljaard	1,810	47.6	+13.7
Rejected ballots		26	0.7	-0.3
Majority		159	4.2	−15.3
Turnout		3,805	57.2	−10.4
National hold		Swing	-7.7	

General election 1938: Wonderboom
Party	Candidate	Votes	%	±%
United	J. A. P. Venter	2,539	49.2	−4.2
Purified National	A. E. du Toit	2,530	49.0	New
Independent	J. P. Joubert	51	1.0	New
Rejected ballots		49	0.8	-0.2
Majority		9	0.2	N/A
Turnout		5,161	80.1	+12.5
United hold		Swing	N/A	
