= Malherbe (surname) =

Malherbe is a surname of French origin. It is common in South Africa due to the immigration of Huguenots in the late 17th century.

Notable people with the surname include:

== de Malherbe family from Normandy, France ==
- François de Malherbe (1555–1628), French poet, reformer of French language
- Marc-Antoine de Malherbe (1600–1627), duellist, son of the poet François de Malherbe
- Jean-Baptiste-Antoine de Malherbe (1712–1771), archbishop of Tours
- Jean de Malherbe (1911–1983), author in political and economic sciences

== de Malherbe family from Maine, France ==
- Raymond de Malherbe (1826–1891), French politician, senator
- Maria-Dolorès de Malherbe (1894–1966), recognised "Righteous Among the Nations"
- Guy de Malherbe (born 1958), French painter
- Apolline de Malherbe (born 1980), television journalist

== Malherbe family from South Africa ==
- Daniël Francois Malherbe (1881–1969), South-African Afrikaans-language novelist, poet, dramatist and scholar
- Arnaud Malherbe (born 1972), South-African athlete, 400 meters runner
- Frans Malherbe (born 1991), South-African international rugby union player
- Stephanie Malherbe (born 1996), South-African international football player

== Malherbe families from Belgium ==
- Jean-François Malherbe (1950–2015), Belgian philosopher and writer
- André Malherbe (1956–2022), Belgian Grand Prix motocross racer
- Anne Malherbe Gosselin (born 1968), Belgian spouse of Rafael Correa, president of Ecuador from 2007 to 2017

== Others ==
- Alfred Malherbe (1804–1865), French magistrate and naturalist
- Annet Malherbe (born 1957), Dutch actress
- Arnaud Malherbe (director) (born 1972), French script writer and director
- Charles Théodore Malherbe (1853–1911), French violinist, musicologist, music editor and composer
- Delphine de Malherbe (born 1973), French writer and play director
- Didier Malherbe (born 1943), French rock and jazz saxophonist
- Edmond Malherbe (1870–1963), French composer
- Guy Malherbe (born 1946), French politician, mayor and member of the National Assembly
- Henri de Malherbe (fl. 1910–1932), French international rugby union player (list of selections) and chairman of SC Mazamet
- Henry Malherbe (1886–1958), journalist and French writer, winner of the Prix Goncourt in 1917
- Hermeline Malherbe (born 1969), French politician, senator
- Jean Fontaine-Malherbe (c. 1740–1780), French writer
- Jean-François Boursault-Malherbe (1750–1842), French revolutionary and theater director
- Joseph Anne Robert Malherbe (1758–1841), French politician and magistrate
- Mabel Malherbe (1879–1964), South African politician
- Michel Malherbe (encyclopaedist) (born 1930), French civil engineer and encyclopedist
- Michel Malherbe (philosopher) (born 1941), French philosopher
- Óscar Malherbe de León (born 1964), Mexican drug lord
- Pierre-Olivier Malherbe (ca. 1569 - ca. 1616), French explorer
- Suzanne Malherbe (1892–1972), French illustrator and photographer

== See also ==
- Malherbe (disambiguation)
