= Pretoria District South (House of Assembly of South Africa constituency) =

South African constituency, 1910–1929

- Pretoria-Distrik-Suid
- Former constituency for the South African House of Assembly
- Province: Transvaal
- Electorate: 2,274 (1925 by)

Former constituency
- Created: 1910
- Abolished: 1929
- Number of members: 1
- Last MHA: H. D. van Broekhuizen (NP)
- Replaced by: Pretoria District

Pretoria District South (Afrikaans: Pretoria-Distrik-Suid) was a constituency in the Transvaal Province of South Africa, which existed from 1910 to 1929. It covered a rural area to the south of Pretoria, the administrative capital of South Africa. Throughout its existence it elected one member to the House of Assembly and one to the Transvaal Provincial Council.

== Franchise notes ==
When the Union of South Africa was formed in 1910, the electoral qualifications in use in each pre-existing colony were kept in place. In the Transvaal Colony, and its predecessor the South African Republic, the vote was restricted to white men, and as such, elections in the Transvaal Province were held on a whites-only franchise from the beginning. The franchise was also restricted by property and education qualifications until the 1933 general election, following the passage of the Women's Enfranchisement Act, 1930 and the Franchise Laws Amendment Act, 1931. From then on, the franchise was given to all white citizens aged 21 or over. Non-whites remained disenfranchised until the end of apartheid and the introduction of universal suffrage in 1994.

== History ==
Pretoria District South, like most of the rural Transvaal, had a largely Afrikaans-speaking electorate, but it was influenced by its proximity to the capital. The result was a strongly marginal seat, with fierce contests between the South African and National parties. Two of its MPs, C. F. Beyers and Chris Muller, had been involved in the Maritz rebellion - Beyers died in action during the rebellion, while Muller survived and was elected to parliament after the end of World War I. He resigned in 1925, and the resulting by-election was won by H. D. van Broekhuizen, who moved to neighbouring Wonderboom on the seat's abolition in 1929.

== Members ==
| Election | Member | Party |
|---|---|---|
| 1910 | C. F. Beyers | Het Volk |
| 1912 by | Jacobus van der Walt | South African |
| 1915 | Jacobus van der Walt | South African |
| 1920 | Chris Muller | National |
| 1921 | Chris Muller | National |
| 1924 | Chris Muller | National |
| 1925 by | H. D. van Broekhuizen | National |
| 1929 | constituency abolished | |

== Detailed results ==
=== Elections in the 1910s ===
General election 1910: Pretoria District South
| Party | Candidate | Votes | % | ±% |
|---|---|---|---|---|
| Het Volk | C. F. Beyers | Unopposed | | |
| Het Volk win (new seat) | | | | |

Pretoria District South by-election, 30 September 1912
| Party | Candidate | Votes | % | ±% |
|---|---|---|---|---|
| South African | Jacobus van der Walt | Unopposed | | |
| South African hold | | | | |

General election 1915: Pretoria District South
| Party | Candidate | Votes | % | ±% |
|---|---|---|---|---|
| South African | Jacobus van der Walt | 1,104 | 48.5 | N/A |
| National | H. S. Webb | 1,034 | 45.4 | New |
| Labour | W. P. Thorn | 140 | 6.1 | New |
| Majority | | 70 | 3.1 | N/A |
| Turnout | | 2,278 | 80.6 | N/A |
| South African hold | | Swing | N/A | |

=== Elections in the 1920s ===
General election 1920: Pretoria District South
| Party | Candidate | Votes | % | ±% |
|---|---|---|---|---|
| National | Chris Muller | 987 | 51.0 | +5.6 |
| South African | Jacobus van der Walt | 948 | 49.0 | +0.5 |
| Majority | | 39 | 2.0 | N/A |
| Turnout | | 1,935 | 66.6 | −14.0 |
| National gain from South African | | Swing | +2.6 | |

General election 1921: Pretoria District South
| Party | Candidate | Votes | % | ±% |
|---|---|---|---|---|
| National | Chris Muller | 1,227 | 52.2 | +1.2 |
| South African | J. F. Ludorf | 1,123 | 47.8 | −1.2 |
| Majority | | 104 | 4.4 | +2.4 |
| Turnout | | 2,350 | 72.0 | +5.4 |
| National hold | | Swing | +1.2 | |

General election 1924: Pretoria District South
| Party | Candidate | Votes | % | ±% |
|---|---|---|---|---|
| National | Chris Muller | 1,021 | 55.4 | +3.2 |
| South African | J. van der Walt | 812 | 44.1 | −3.7 |
| Rejected ballots | | 9 | 0.5 | N/A |
| Majority | | 209 | 11.3 | +6.9 |
| Turnout | | 1,842 | 82.5 | +10.5 |
| National hold | | Swing | +3.5 | |
