= Banneville-sur-Ajon =

- Part of Malherbe-sur-Ajon
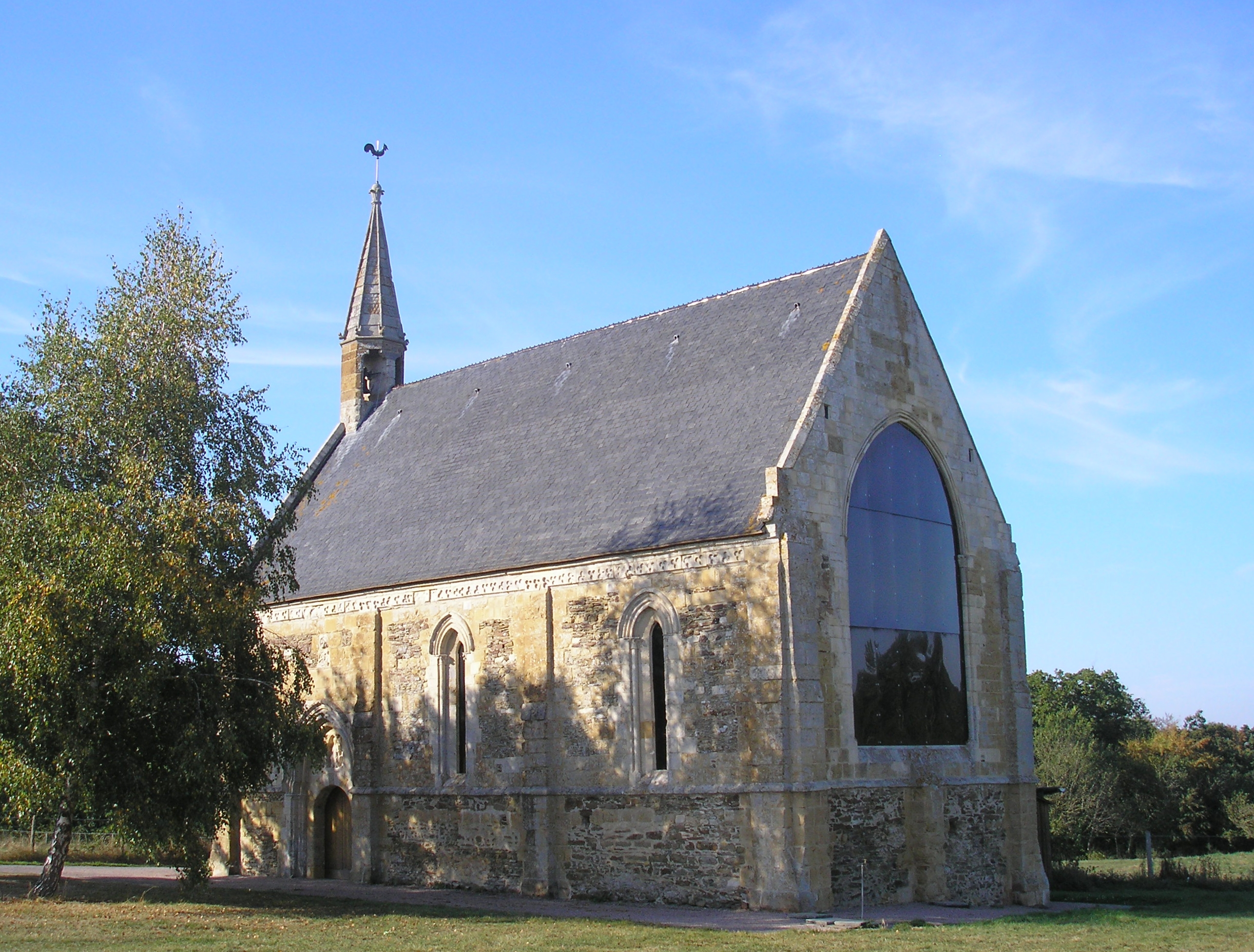
- The Chapel of Saint Clair
- Location of Banneville-sur-Ajon
- Location within France Location within Normandy
- Coordinates: 49°03′49″N 0°34′07″W
- Country: France
- Region: Normandy
- Department: Calvados
- Arrondissement: Vire
- Canton: Les Monts d'Aunay
- Commune: Malherbe-sur-Ajon
- Area^{1}: 5.63 km^{2} (2.17 sq mi)
- Elevation: 141 m (463 ft)
- Highest elevation: 184 m (604 ft)
- Lowest elevation: 84 m (276 ft)
- Population (2019): 438
  - Density: 77.8/km^{2} (201/sq mi)
- Time zone: UTC+01:00 (CET)
  - Summer (DST): UTC+02:00 (CEST)
- Postal code: 14260
- ^{1} French Land Register data, which excludes lakes, ponds, glaciers > 1 km^{2} (0.386 sq mi or 247 acres) and river estuaries.

Banneville-sur-Ajon is a former commune in the Calvados department in the Normandy region of north-western France. On 1 January 2016, it was merged into the new commune of Malherbe-sur-Ajon.

== Geography ==
Banneville-sur-Ajon is located some 20 km south-west of Caen and 7 km south-east of Villers-Bocage. Access to the commune is by the D121A from Saint-Agnan-le-Malherbe in the south which passes through the centre of the commune and the village and continues north to join the D8. The D171 from Landes-sur-Ajon to Préaux-Bocage passes through the north-east of the commune. Apart from the village there are the hamlets of La Fêterie in the south and Gournay in the north. The commune is almost all farmland.

The Ajon river flows through the commune from south-east to north-west continuing to join the Odon south-west of Le Locheur. The Orgeuil river rises in the south of the commune and flows north-east through the length of the commune to join the Ajon. The Ruisseau de la Rette flows from the south to join the Orgeuil.

== Toponymy ==
Banneville-sur-Ajon was Barneville sur Ajon in 1371. René Lepelley attributed the origin of the name to the Germanic anthroponym Benno with the Old French suffix -ville meaning "rural domain".

== Administration ==
List of Successive Mayors

From	To	Name
1995	2001	Jacques Vahe
2001	2014	Annick Viel-Schneider
2014	2016	Marcel Pétré

== Demography ==
The inhabitants of the commune are known as Bannevillais or Bannevillaises in French.

Historical population

Year	Pop.	±% p.a.
1793	508	—
1800	530	+0.61%
1806	524	−0.19%
1821	475	−0.65%
1831	441	−0.74%
1836	458	+0.76%
1841	439	−0.84%
1846	414	−1.17%
1851	412	−0.10%
1856	406	−0.29%
1861	380	−1.31%
1866	375	−0.26%
1872	362	−0.59%
1876	354	−0.56%
1881	362	+0.45%
1886	347	−0.84%
1891	331	−0.94%
1896	314	−1.05%

Year	Pop.	±% p.a.
1901	315	+0.06%
1906	290	−1.64%
1911	273	−1.20%
1921	255	−0.68%
1926	259	+0.31%
1931	243	−1.27%
1936	265	+1.75%
1946	233	−1.28%
1954	243	+0.53%
1962	216	−1.46%
1968	211	−0.39%
1975	224	+0.86%
1982	346	+6.41%
1990	360	+0.50%
1999	389	+0.86%
2007	394	+0.16%
2012	383	−0.56%
2019	438	+1.94%

Source: EHESS and INSEE

== Sites and monuments ==
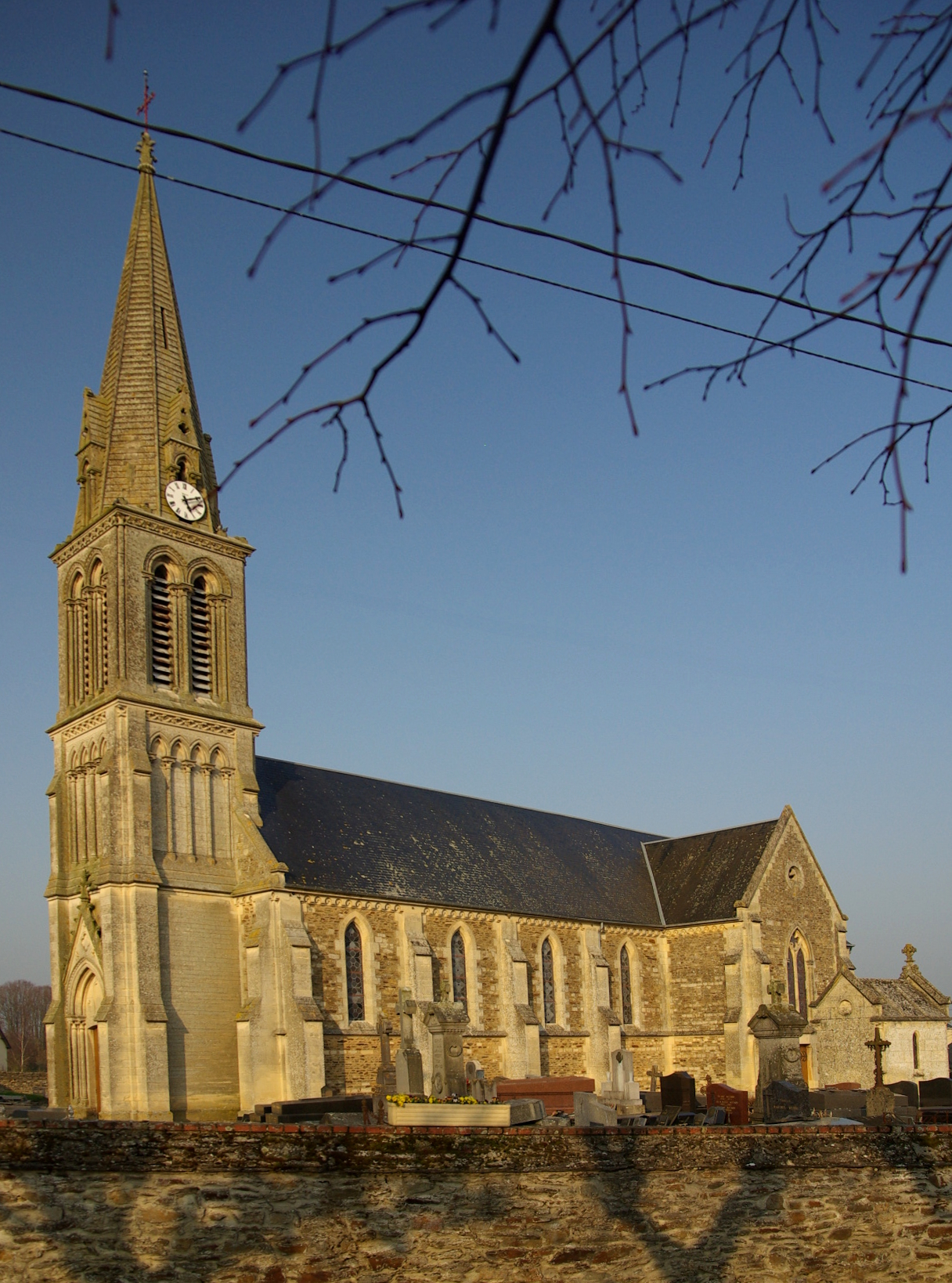
The Church of Saint-Melaine

- The Chapel of Saint-Clair (13th century) is registered as an historical monument. The church is built on a simple rectangular plan. On the tympanum of the south portal there is a figure in bas-relief of Saint Samson on his throne, and inside is a statue of Saint Clair.
- The Church of Saint-Melaine is in neo-Gothic style from the late 19th century.
- A replica of the grotto of Lourdes was built at a place called Le Village at the end of the Second World War.

=== Chapel Picture Gallery ===
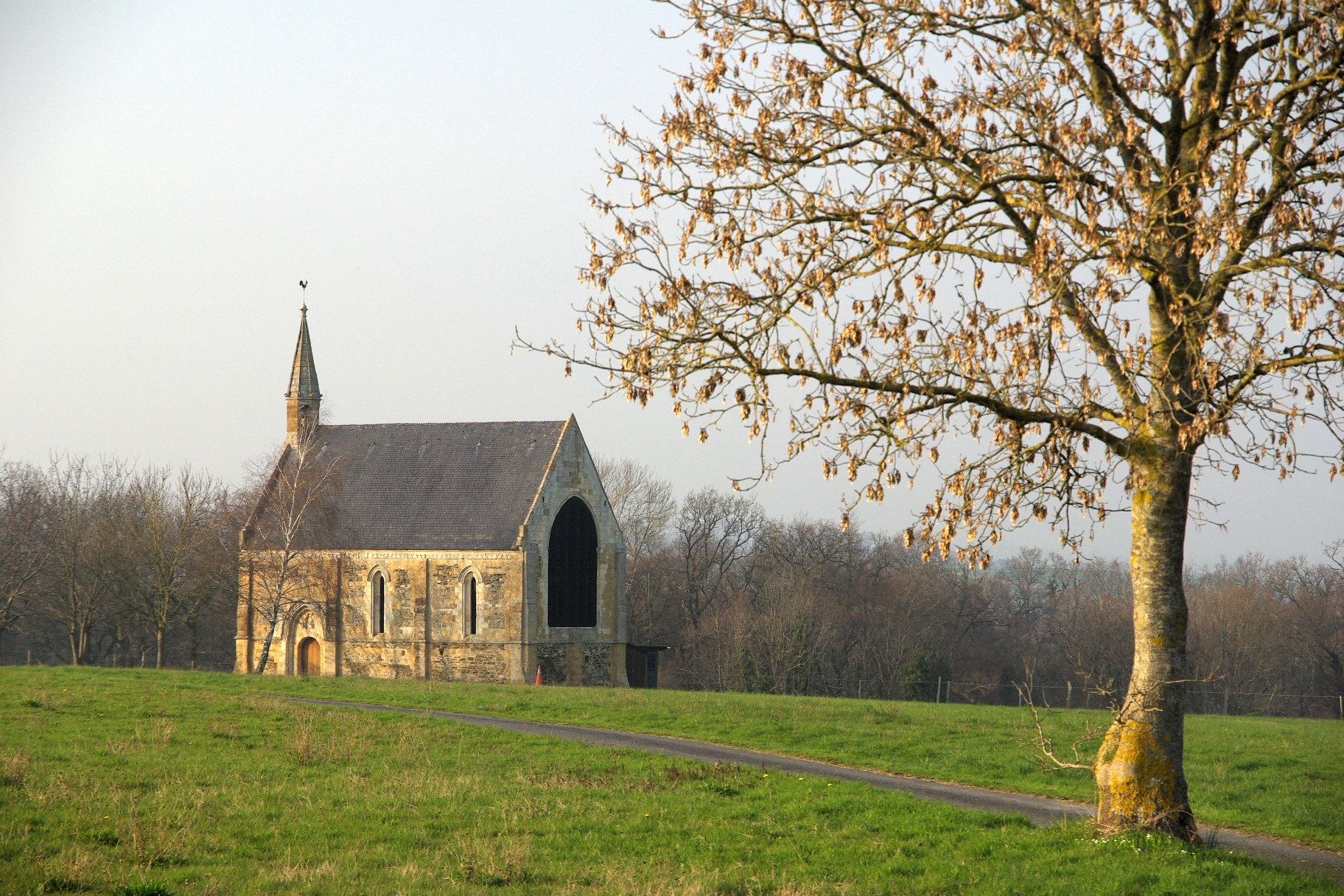
The Chapel of Saint Clair

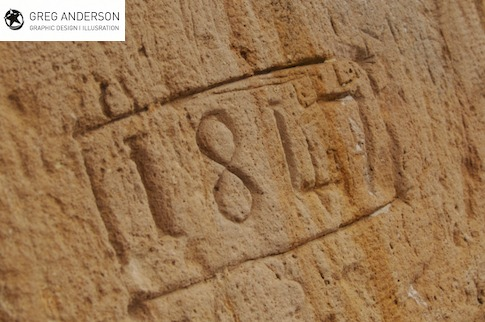
A Detail in the Chapel

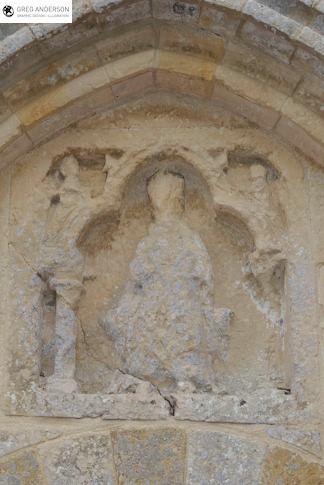
The Chapel

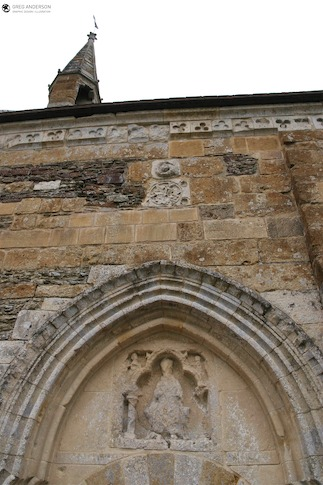
Detail on the Chapel

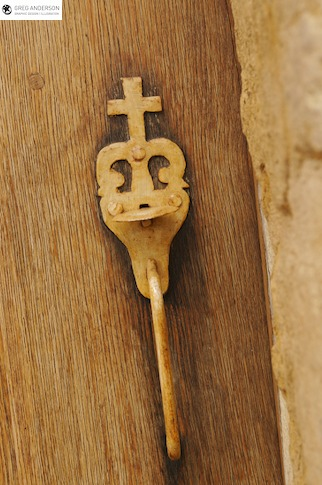
The door handle of the Chapel

== See also ==
- Communes of the Calvados department
