= Georges Poisson =

French art historian (1924–2022)

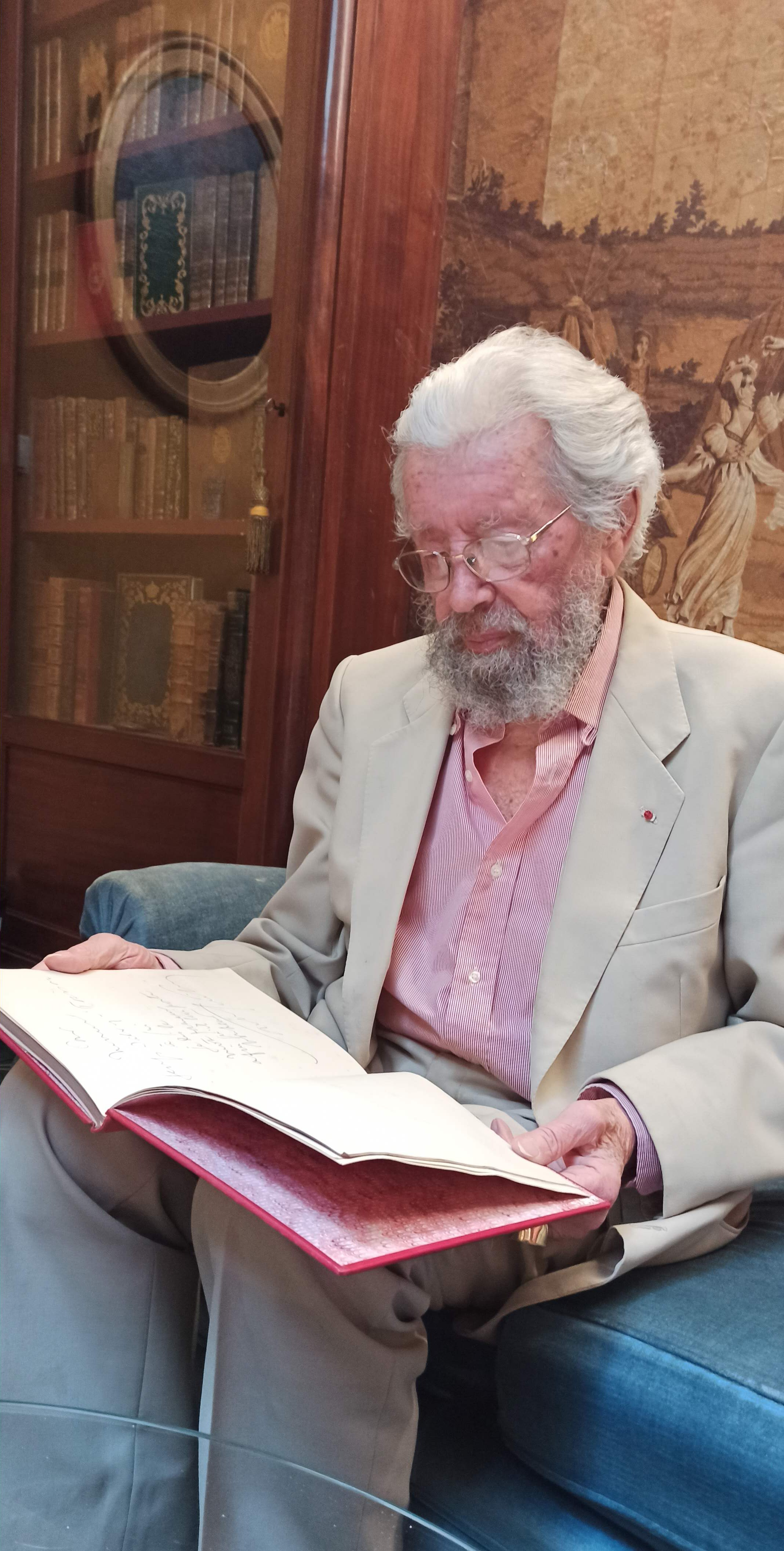
Georges Poisson

Georges Poisson (27 November 1924 – 14 May 2022) was a French art historian.

Poisson was born in Düsseldorf on 27 November 1924. A nephew of demographer Alfred Sauvy, and journalist Titaÿna, Georges Poisson was the son of journalist Claude Salvy (Marie-Madeleine Sauvy).

A curator of the musée de l'Île-de-France at château de Sceaux from 1948, Georges Poisson developed there the collections, created a documentation center, an educational service, organized exhibitions and concerts. At the same time, he carried out reorganization missions to the museums of Meudon (where the organization of the rooms was rethought,), Courbevoie, Dourdan, Blaye, etc. He was the initiator of the gift of bibliophile André Desguines's library to the department of Hauts-de-Seine.

A defender of monuments and sites, he led many successful campaigns: rescue, with Alain Decaux, of the château de Monte-Cristo, restoration of the Great Perspective of Meudon, decisive actions at Chateaubriand's home in the Vallée-aux-Loups (Châtenay-Malabry) and in that of Émile Zola in Médan.

Poisson died on 14 May 2022, at the age of 97.

== Publications ==
- 1945: Normandie, terre meurtrie, Paris, Compagnie des Arts Photomécaniques, 1945
- 1950: Les musées de France, Presses Universitaires de France, series "Que sais-je?", 1950
- 1951: Sceaux, histoire et guide, Paris, Éd. L'Indispensable, 1951
- 1951: Guide du Touriste Lettré, in collaboration with Pierre d'Espezel, Curnonsky, André Thérive etc., Paris, Éd. Ch. Poisson
- 1952: Paris et ses environs, in collaboration with René Mathieu, preface by Jules Romains, Éd. Nagel
- 1952: La vie parisienne vue par les peintres, Paris, Éd. Nathan
- 1954: Urbanisme et architecture, in collaboration, [mélanges publiés en l'honneur du professeur Lavedan], Paris, Éd. Laurens
- 1955: Lisieux et le pays d'Auge, in collaboration with Patrice Boussel, Paris, Éditions du Centurion, series "Plaisir du voyage"
- 1955: La femme dans la peinture moderne, Paris, Plon
- 1955: Les environs de Paris, Paris, Éd. Hachette, series "Guides Bleus"
- 1956: Évocation du Grand Paris, volume I, "La banlieue sud" Paris, Éditions de Minuit
- Nièvre, under the direction of Henry de Ségogne, Paris, Éd. Kléber-Colombes
- 1958: Fontaines de Paris, Éditions du Centurion
- 1958: Les peintres du rêve, Plon
- 1958: Le Val de Marne, (Prix de l’Académie française)
- La Principauté de Monaco, Éditions du Centurion
- 1960: Évocation du Grand Paris, volume II, "La banlieue Nord-Ouest", Éd. de Minuit
- 1962: Histoire souriante de Paris, Éd. Berger et Levrault
- 1963: Les Châteaux de la Loire, Éd. Larousse
- 1964: Napoléon et Paris
- 1965: Moyen Âge en Ile-de-France, Fayard
- 1965: Pays du dimanche : Ile-de-France, 2 Sud, Éd. Arts et Métiers graphiques
- 1966: Monuments de Paris, with Georges Huisman, series "Guides Bleus", Éd. Hachette
- 1967: Histoire du Val d’Oise, supplement to n° 5 of Bulletin d'Information de la Préfecture de Val d'Oise
- 1967: Promenades aux Châteaux de l’Ile-de-France, Éd. André Balland
- 1968: Le Val de Marne, Art et Histoire, Éd. de Minuit, (prix Toutain 1968; prix de l'Académie française).
- 1969: Saint-Simon, Album de la Pléiade, bibliothèque de la Pléiade, éditions Gallimard
- 1973: De Maisons-sur-Seine à Maisons-Laffitte
- 1976: Les musées de France, PUF, series "Que sais-je"
- 1977: Cette curieuse famille d’Orléans
- 1977: Donation André Dunoyer de Segonzac (1965), in collaboration with Maddy Ariès
- 1980: Histoire des grands boulevards, (prix de l’Académie française)
- 1981: Histoire et histoires de Sceaux, preface by Georges Duhamel
- 1981: À la recherche des châteaux perdus, preface by Duchess de La Rochefoucauld
- 1982: Charenton-le-Pont, 5000 ans d’histoire, preface by Alain Griotteray
- 1983: Dix siècles à Montfort l’Amaury, in collaboration with M.H. Hadrot, preface by Jacques de Lacretelle, (prix Georges Goyau; prix de l’Académie française).
- 1984: L’Essonne dans la Seine-et-Oise d’autrefois
- 1985: Les Hauts-de-Seine, 60 ans avant leur naissance
- 1986: Choderlos de Laclos ou l'obstination, Éd. Grasset et Fasquelle, (prix Goncourt de la biographie)
- 1986: Le duc de Saint-Simon (seigneur de La Ferté-Vidame) et le Perche, Éd. des Amis du Perche
- 1987: La curieuse histoire du Vésinet, preface by Alain Decaux
- 1987: Monsieur de Saint-Simon, (Henry Malherbe Prize)
- 1987: Monte-Cristo, un château de roman, preface by Alain Decaux, Éd. Champflour, 122 p.
- 1988: L’Élysée, histoire d’un palais (de la marquise de Pompadour à Valéry Giscard d’Estaing), (prix Biguet; prix de l’Académie française).
- 1989: Paris au temps de la Révolution
- 1990: Guide des statues de Paris, Éd. Hazan
- 1991: Guide des maisons d’Hommes célèbres
- 1992: Histoire de Saint-Maurice
- 1993: Rueil-Malmaison, quinze siècles d’histoire
- 1993: Les Chemins du Roi Soleil
- 1997: Histoire de l’architecture à Paris
- 1998: La Ferté-Vidame, in collaboration with François Dugas du Villard, Michel Lallemand, Gérard Mabille and Philippe Siguret, Éd. des Amis du Perche
- 1999: Histoire de l’Élysée, de Madame de Pompadour à Jacques Chirac, Éd. Perrin, ISBN 2262025673
- 1999: La duchesse de Chevreuse, Éd. Perrin, ISBN 978-2-262-01499-5.
- 1999: Dictionnaire des Monuments d’Ile-de-France, preface by Jean-Paul Huchon, Éd. Hervas, (prix des Vieilles Maisons Françaises)
- 2001: Maintenon, Éd. Norma
- 2002: Les Grands Travaux des Présidents de la Ve République : de Charles de Gaulle à Jacques Chirac, Éd. Parigramme, 2002, 196 p. ISBN 2840962128
- 2002: Napoléon Ier et Paris, l'empereur architecte, Éd. Tallandier, Bibliothèque Napoléonienne, ISBN 2847340114
- 2003: "Les soirées de Médan", Cahiers Rouges n°129 [Zola-Maupassant-Huysmans], preface by Georges Poisson and Léon Hennique, Éditions Grasset
- 2004: Retour des cendres de Napoléon, preface by Jean Tulard, Éd. Tallandier
- 2006: Retour des cendres de l’Aiglon, Éd. du Nouveau Monde, ISBN 2847361847
- 2006: Les secrets de l'Élysée, Éd. Timé, col. "Les plus belles histoires", ISBN 291558673X
- 2007: Sacha Guitry entre en scène, Éd. Timé, col. "Les plus belles histoires", ISBN 2915586969
- 2007: Monsieur de Saint-Simon, Éd. Nouveau Monde, ISBN 2847362339
- 2009: Combats pour le Patrimoine, Éd. Pygmalion, ISBN 2756402052
- 2009: Saint-Simon, Sceaux et l’Ile-de-France, preface by Philippe Hourcade, Société Saint-Simon
- 2009: Le Comte de Chambord, Éd. Pygmalion, ISBN 2756402052
- 2010: L’Élysée : histoire d'un palais des origines à Sarkozy, Éd. Pygmalion, ISBN 2756403008
- 2013: La Grande histoire du Louvre, Éd. Perrin, col. "Synthèses Économiques", ISBN 2262037574
- 2014: Tel était Molière, Actes Sud-Papiers, ISBN 978-2-330-03031-5

== Honours and titles ==
- Commandeur de la Légion d'honneur
- Commandeur of the Ordre des Arts et des Lettres
- Great medal of art history of the Académie d'architecture
- honoris causa doctor of Sōka University at Tokyo
- Honorary President, co-founder of the Société Saint-Simon
