= Latresne =

- Commune
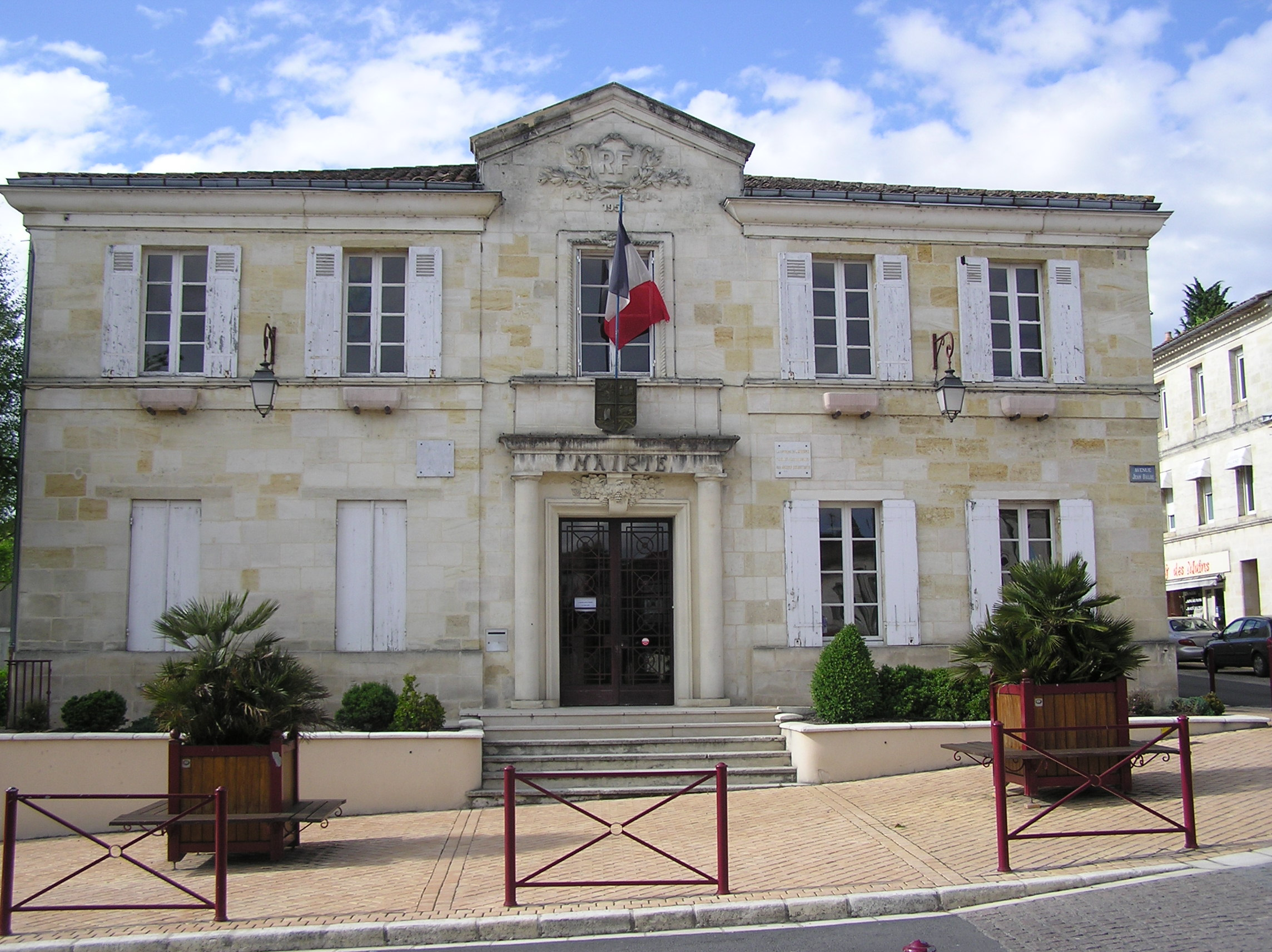
- Town hall

- Coat of arms
- Location of Latresne
- Location within France Location within Nouvelle-Aquitaine
- Coordinates: 44°47′09″N 0°29′43″W
- Country: France
- Region: Nouvelle-Aquitaine
- Department: Gironde
- Arrondissement: Bordeaux
- Canton: Créon
- Intercommunality: Portes de l'Entre Deux Mers

Government
  - Mayor (2020–2026): Ronan Fleho
- Area^{1}: 10.39 km^{2} (4.01 sq mi)
- Elevation: 50 m (160 ft)
- Highest elevation: 72 m (236 ft)
- Lowest elevation: 2 m (6.6 ft)
- Population (2023): 3,714
  - Density: 357.5/km^{2} (925.8/sq mi)
- Time zone: UTC+01:00 (CET)
  - Summer (DST): UTC+02:00 (CEST)
- INSEE/Postal code: 33234 /33360
- ^{1} French Land Register data, which excludes lakes, ponds, glaciers > 1 km^{2} (0.386 sq mi or 247 acres) and river estuaries.

Latresne (French pronunciation: [latʁɛn]; Occitan: La Trèna) is a commune in the Gironde department in Nouvelle-Aquitaine in southwestern France. The 20th-century French jurist and Islamologist Georges-Henri Bousquet (1900–1978) died in Latresne.

== Population ==
Historical population
Year	Pop.	±% p.a.
1968	2,175	—
1975	3,025	+4.83%
1982	3,266	+1.10%
1990	3,142	−0.48%
1999	3,195	+0.19%
2007	3,306	+0.43%
2012	3,324	+0.11%
2017	3,497	+1.02%
2023	3,714	+1.01%
Source: INSEE

== See also ==
- Château de Malherbes
- Communes of the Gironde department
