= Prix Henry Malherbe =

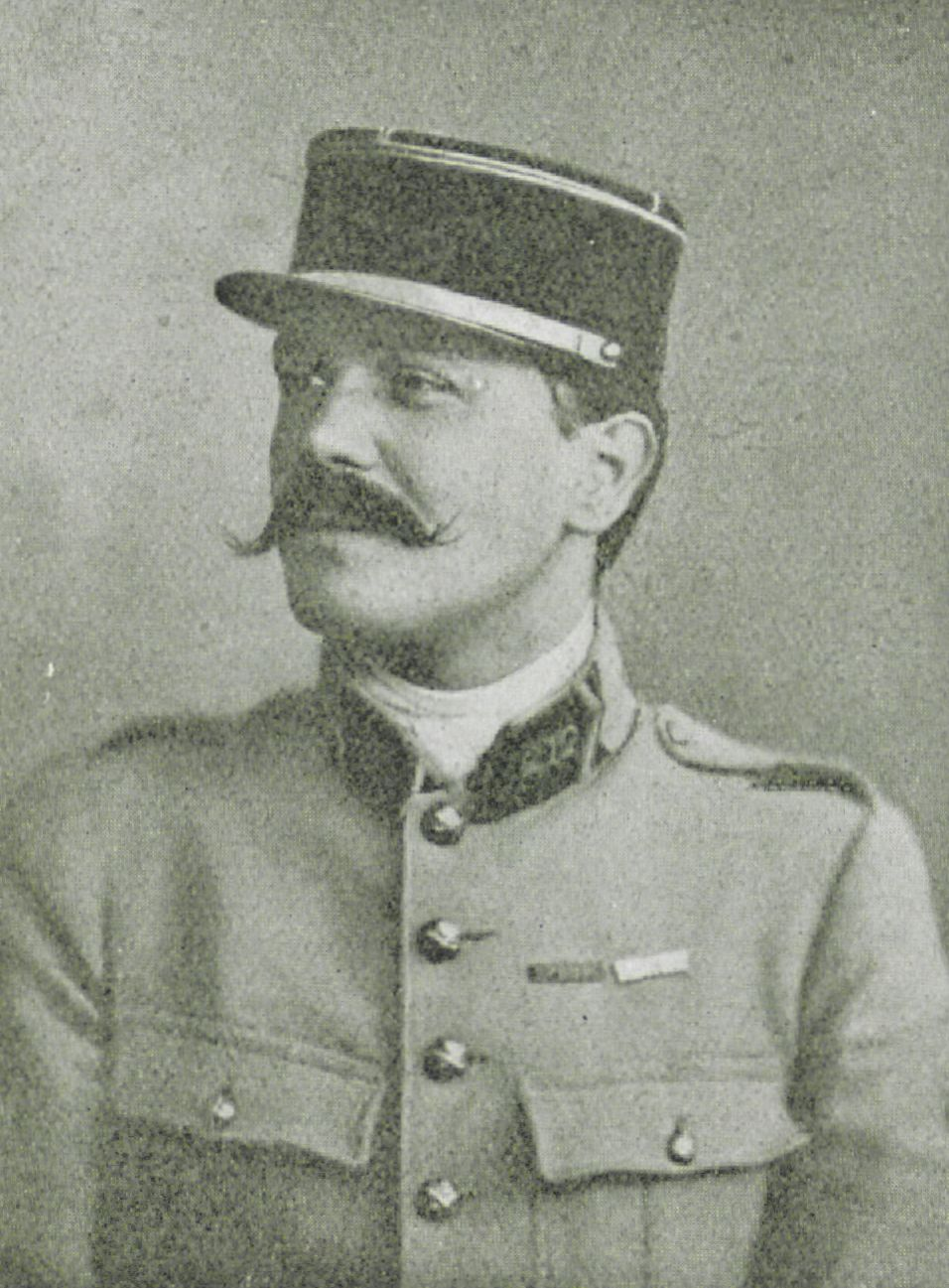
Henry Malherbe

The Henry Malherbe Prize is a French literary award created in 1953 by the Association des écrivains combattants. Named for Henry Malherbe, who received the Prix Goncourt in 1917, it is awarded every year for an essay.

== List of winners ==
- 1963 - Bernard Gavoty
- 1964 - Jean Toulat
- 1965 - André Jean Ducasse
- 1966 - René-Gustave Nobécourt
- 1967 - André Latreille
- 1968 - André Brissaud
- 1969 - Janine Weill
- 1970 - Louise Weiss
- 1971 - Christian Bernadac
- 1972 - Raymond Leopold Bruckberger
- 1973 - Pierre Billotte
- 1974 - Alain Griotteray
- 1975 - Georges Poisson
- 1976 - Michel Droit
- 1977 - Pierre-Paul Grasse
- 1978 - Jean-Émile Charon
- 1979 - André Piettre
- 1980 - Suzanne Labin
- 1981 - André Gillois
- 1982 - Frédérique Hébrard
- 1983 - Jacques Bloch-Morange
- 1984 - Yves Coppens
- 1985 - Jean Hamburger
- 1986 - Jean-André Renoux
- 1987 - Bernard Destremau and Albert Chambon
- 1988 - Claude des Presles
- 1989 - Pierre Deniker
- 1990 - Anne Muratori-Philip
- 1991 - Jean-Jacques Antier
- 1992 - Bernard Pierre
- 1993 - Jacques Chaban-Delmas
- 1994 - Michel Debré
- 1995 - Alain Peyrefitte
- 1996 - Jean-Pierre Bois
- 1998 - Hélène Simon
- 1999 - Claire Daudin
- 2001 - Étienne de Montety
- 2002 - Xavier Boniface
- 2003 - Philippe Masson
- 2004 - Arnaud Tessier
- 2005 - François Kersa
- 2006 - Annie Laurent
- 2008 - Stéphanie Petit
- 2009 - Nicolas Beaupré
- 2010 - Antony Beevor
- 2011 - Valéry Giscard d'Estaing
- 2012 - Paul-François Paoli
- 2013 - François d'Orcival
- 2014 - Alain Gérard
- 2015 - François-Xavier Bellamy
- 2016 - Arnaud Benedetti and Charles-Louis Foulon
- 2017- Jean-Noël Jeanneney
