= Battle of Helvetia =

Second Boer War battle on 29 December 1900

- Part of the Second Boer War
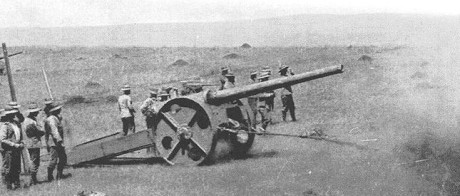
- A 4.7 inch naval gun similar to the Lady Roberts gun, captured at the Battle of Helvetia, South Africa, on 29 December 1900.
Date	29 December 1900
Location	Helvetia near Machadodorp, eastern South African Republic
Result	Boer victory

Belligerents
Transvaal; Orange Free State	Britain

Commanders and leaders
Ben Viljoen; Chris Muller	Major Stapleton Lynch Cotton

Casualties and losses
3 fallen, 5 wounded	11 fallen, 29 wounded, 235 captured

The Battle of Helvetia was an engagement in the Second Boer War fought by Boer and British troops on 29 December 1900 in Helvetia 10 km north of Machadodorp, eastern South African Republic.

== Battle ==
Boer troops under Vechtgeneraal Chris Muller and overall command of General Ben Viljoen won a surprise victory over the British forces of Major Stapleton Lynch Cotton (1860-1928), attacking them from east and west at dark before daybreak. The Boers numbered about 580 men (or 350), while the British forces were only about 350 men strong, however boasting a 120mm (4.7 inch) naval cannon. Muller and his troops took 235 prisoners of war and the cannon. After burning British army stocks, Boer troops fled for oncoming British reinforcements.

== Aftermath ==
Muller later became particularly famous for the capture of this cannon, jokingly called the 'Lady Roberts'. Major Cotton, 1st Battalion King's Liverpool Regiment, was convicted of quitting his post at Helvetia, but acquitted of neglect of good order and military discipline.

== Literature ==
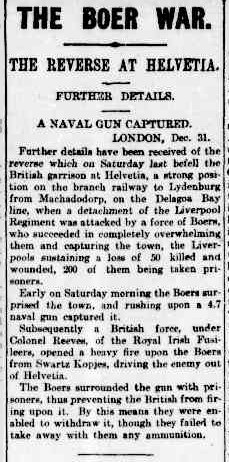
Newspaper report in The Argus (Melbourne), 2 January 1901: The Boer War. The setback in Helvetia.

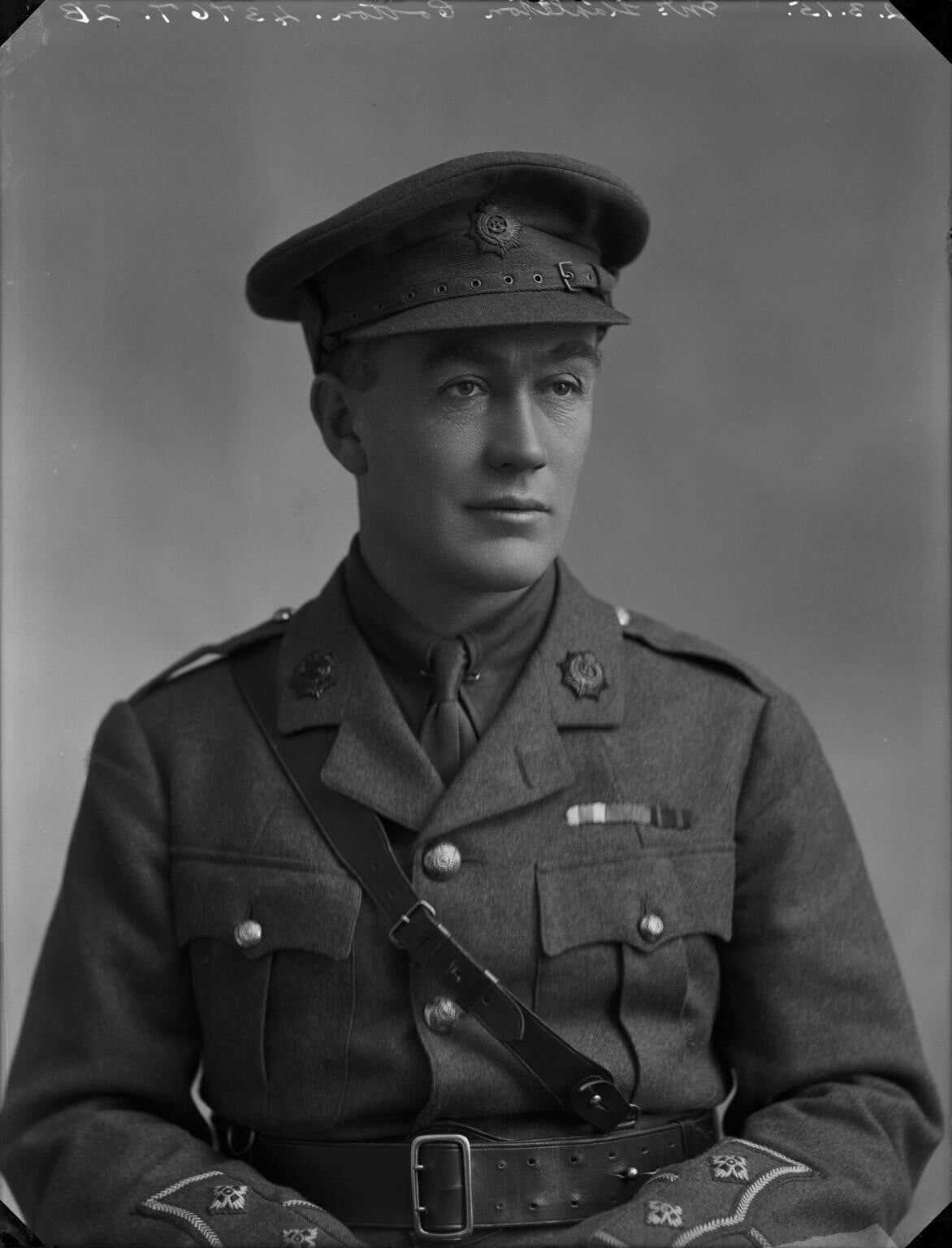
Stapleton Lynch Cotton (1860-1928).

- Amery, Leo S. Chapter IV Nooitgedacht and the Transvaal Outbreak (Dec. 1900—Jan. 1901) in: The Times history of the war in South Africa 1899-1902. At the website angloboerwar.com of David Biggins.
- Grobler, J.E.H.: The War Reporter. Jonathan Ball Publishers. 2004. ISBN 978-1-86842-186-2.
- Pakenham, Thomas (1979). The Boer War. New York: Random House. ISBN 0-394-42742-4 – via archive.org. Page 493.
- Viljoen, B. J. (1902). CHAPTER XXVIII. CAPTURE OF "LADY ROBERTS." from My Reminiscences of the Anglo-Boer War. Project Gutenberg. p. 285.

== See also ==
- Military history of South Africa
