= Georges-Henri Bousquet =

French jurist, economist and Islamologist

Georges-Henri Bousquet (21 June 1900 in Meudon – 23 January 1978 in Latresne) was a 20th-century French jurist, economist and Islamologist. He was a professor of law at the Faculty of Law of the University of Algiers where he was a specialist in the sociology of North Africa (Berbers, Islam). He is also known for his translation work of the great Muslim authors, Al-Ghazali, a theologian who died in 1111 and Tunisian historian Ibn Khaldun (1332–1406). He was known as a polyglot, spoke several European languages (Dutch, his second mother tongue, English, German, Italian, but also Spanish, Danish, Norwegian) and Eastern ones (Arabic, Malay).

== Biography ==
After studying law, economics and political science in Paris, Bousquet was appointed in 1927 as a lecturer in economics at the Faculty of Law of Algiers. By this time, he learned Arabic and became interested in Islamic studies while preparing the agrégation in political economy, which he passed in 1932. He became a professor and continued his academic career in Algiers for three decades, as an economist and scholar of Islam. The titles of his chair were successively Économie et sociologie nord-africaine (in 1947), to become Histoire comparée des coutumes de l'Islam et économie et sociologie algériennes one year later and finally Droit musulman et sociologie nord-africaine. After the independence of Algeria, Bousquet moved to Bordeaux to complete his academic career: he taught both Muslim sociology and the history of economic thought.

== Publications ==
- 1924: Les tendances nouvelles de l'école autrichienne, Revue d'économie politique, septembre-octobre
- 1929: Joseph Schumpeter: l'œuvre scientifique de quelques économistes étrangers, Revue d'économie politique
- 1930: Introduction à la science économique, Paris, Giard
- 1932: Les bases du système économique, Paris, Giard
- 1933: Les trois notions de l'équilibre économique, Econometrica, 1 (2), août
- 1936: La production et son marché, Paris, Giard
- 1941: L'islam maghrébin. Introduction à l'étude générale de l'islam
- 1949: Les grandes pratiques rituelles de l'islam, Paris : PUF
- 1950:
  - a. dir., Préface et notes éditoriales, Adam Smith. Textes choisis, Paris : Dalloz-Sirey
  - b. L'Islam et la limitation volontaire des naissances, brèves réflexions sur un grand problème social, Population (Institut national d'études démographiques), n°1, January–March, pp. 121–128
  - c. Précis de Droit musulman, principalement malékite et algérien, Alger, La Maison des Livres, 2éd., 2 tomes
  - d. L'islam maghrébin, Alger : La Maison des livres
- 1953: La Morale de l'Islam et son éthique sexuelle, Paris : A. Maisonneuve (Constantine, impr. de Attali)
- 1955: with J. Crisafulli, dir., nouvelle édition analysée avec bibliographie, introduction et notes du livre de Ferdinando Galiani, De la Monnaie, Paris, Librairie M. Rivière
- 1956: Le montant total des richesses d'une nation est-il une grandeur constante ? Le paradoxe de Graslin, Revue économique, Vol 7, n°4, pp. 605–613
- 1957: Les Berbères : histoire et institutions, Paris : Presses universitaires de France, Collection Que sais-je ?
- 1958:
  - a. Un centenaire: l'œuvre de H. H. Gossen et sa véritable structure, Revue d'économie politique, Vol 68, pp499–523
  - b. Histoire de l'économie mathématique jusqu'à Cournot, Metroeconomica, 10, pp121–135
- 1958: A. C. Pigou, Paris : Dalloz-Sirey
- 1959: Un précurseur totalement inconnu de l'étude mathématique du revenu national : Joseph Lang, Revue économique, Vol 10, n°2, pp. 268–274
- 1960:
  - a. Pareto, 1848-1923, le savant et l'homme, Lausanne : Payot et Cie
  - b. Clément Colson, Paris : Dalloz-Sirey
  - c. Esquisse d'une histoire de la science économique en Italie. des origines à Francesco Ferrara, Paris : M. Rivière
- 1962: traduction en français du texte de Joseph Schumpeter écrit en 1914, Epochen der Dogmen und Methoden Geschichte, In: Grundriss der Sozialökonomik, Section I, Tübingen, pp. 81 sqq, In: Esquisse d'une histoire de la science économique, des origines au début du XXe siècle, Paris : Dalloz
- 1963: Le droit musulman, Paris : Armand Collin
- 1964: L'autobibliographie inédite de Léon Walras (1906), Revue économique, Vol 15, n°2, pp295–304
- 1965: Études sur Pareto et les doctrines économiques, politiques, sociales et sociologiques de son époque offertes à M. Georges-Henri Bousquet... à l'occasion de son 65e anniversaire, Genève : Droz
- 1966:
  - a. Deux visions de l'ensemble économique. Francesco Ferrara et E. von Böhm-Bawerk, Revue économique, Vol 17, n°3, pp337–361
  - b. L'éthique sexuelle de l'Islam, Desclée de Brouwer
  - c. review of the book of Marcel van Meerhaeghe, De economie van Vlaanderen, Revue d'économie politique, vol. 76, No. 2 (March–April 1966), p. 375
- 1967:
  - a. Les Mormons, Paris : Presses universitaires de France, Collection Que sais-je ?, 2nd édition mise à jour
  - b. Le hasard. Son rôle dans l'histoire des sociétés, Annales. Économies, Sociétés, Civilisations, Vol 22, n°2, pp. 419–428
- 1970:
  - a. commentaire du livre de Jacques Rueff, Les Dieux et les Rois. Regards sur le pouvoir créateur, Revue économique, Vol 21, n°1, pp166–169
  - b. Commentaire du livre de Jacques Rueff, Des sciences physiques aux sciences morales (un essai de 1922, reconsidéré en 1969), Revue économique, Vol 21, n°6, pp1048–1049
- 1972: commentaire sur le recueil de textes de Carl Menger, volume II in German, Gesammelte Werke, published by Friedrich Hayek, Revue économique, Vol 23, n°1, January, p. 166
- 1973: commentaire du livre d'Erich Schneider, Joseph A. Schumpeter, Leben und Werk eines grossen Sozialökonomen, Revue économique, Vol 24, n°4, pp. 714–715
