= Annie Laurent =

French political scientist

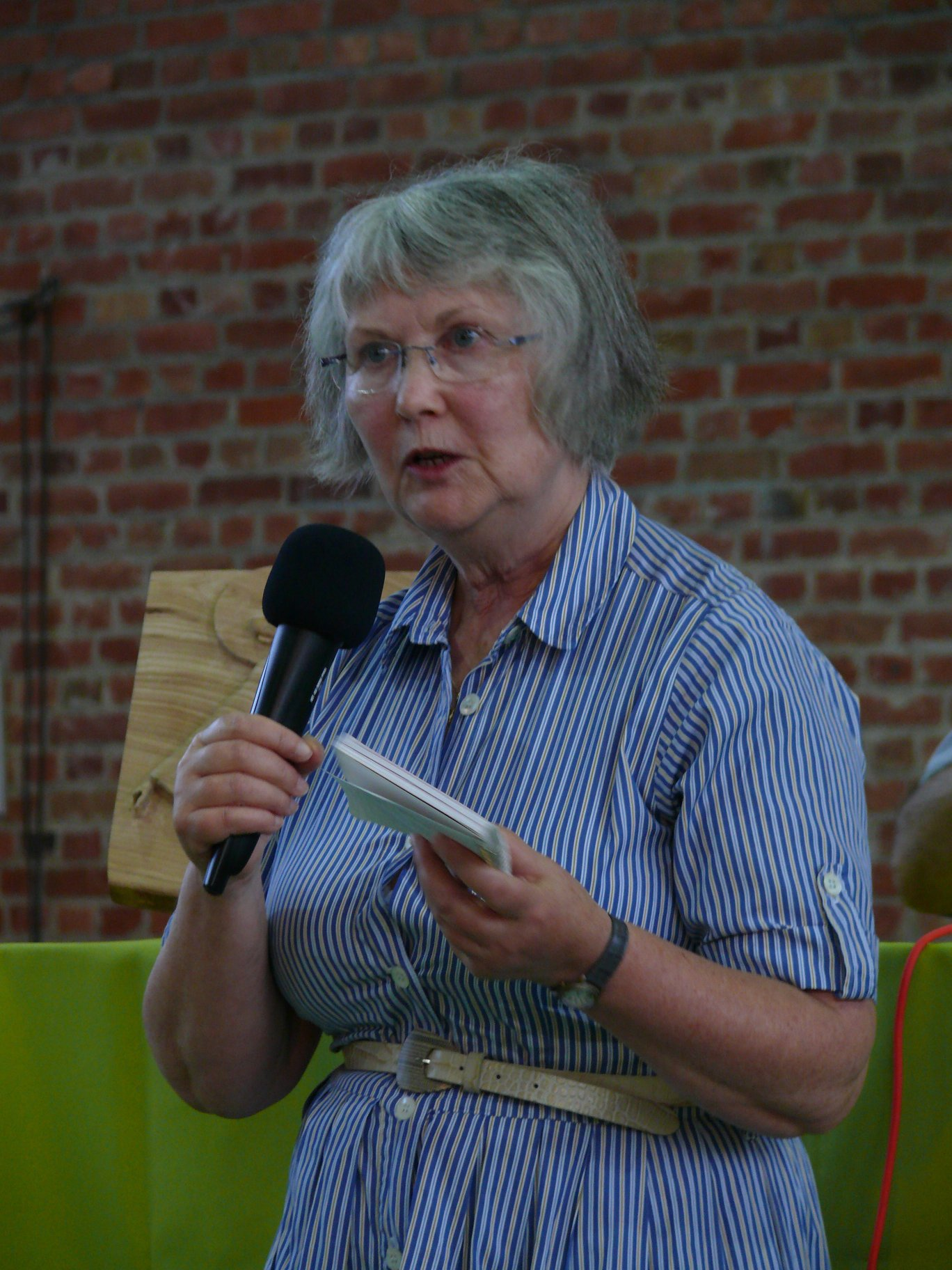
- Born: June 3, 1949 (age 77)
- Occupations: Journalist; Political scientist

Annie Laurent (born June 3, 1949) is a French journalist and political scientist.

== Career ==
In 1983 Laurent obtained a master's degree in international law, and 1986 she graduated with a doctorate in political science from the University of Paris II Panthéon-Assas under the supervision of Pierre-Marie Dupuy.

In 1980, Laurent and Renée Conan (fr) interviewed women who were anti-nuclear activists in Plogoff, and published the book Femmes de Plogoff in 1981.

Between 1988 and 1992, Laurent edited the periodical Libanoscopie in Lebanon.

Pope Benedict XVI appointed her an expert to the Synode spécial des évêques pour le Moyen-Orient, which was held in Rome in October 2010. In 2009 she founded the association Clarifier, a Catholic proselytism organisation.

Laurent's book L'Europe malade de la Turquie was the 2006 winner of the Prix Henry Malherbe.

== Selected works ==
- Femmes de Plogoff (1981)
- Vivre avec l'islam ? : Réflexions chrétiennes sur la religion de Mahomet (1996)
- L'Europe malade de la Turquie (2005)
