= Château de Malherbes =

Coordinates: 44°48′00″N 0°29′39″W

The Château de Malherbes is a château and vineyard located in the commune of Latresne in Gironde, Nouvelle-Aquitaine, France.
