= Parktown (House of Assembly of South Africa constituency) =

- Former constituency for the South African House of Assembly
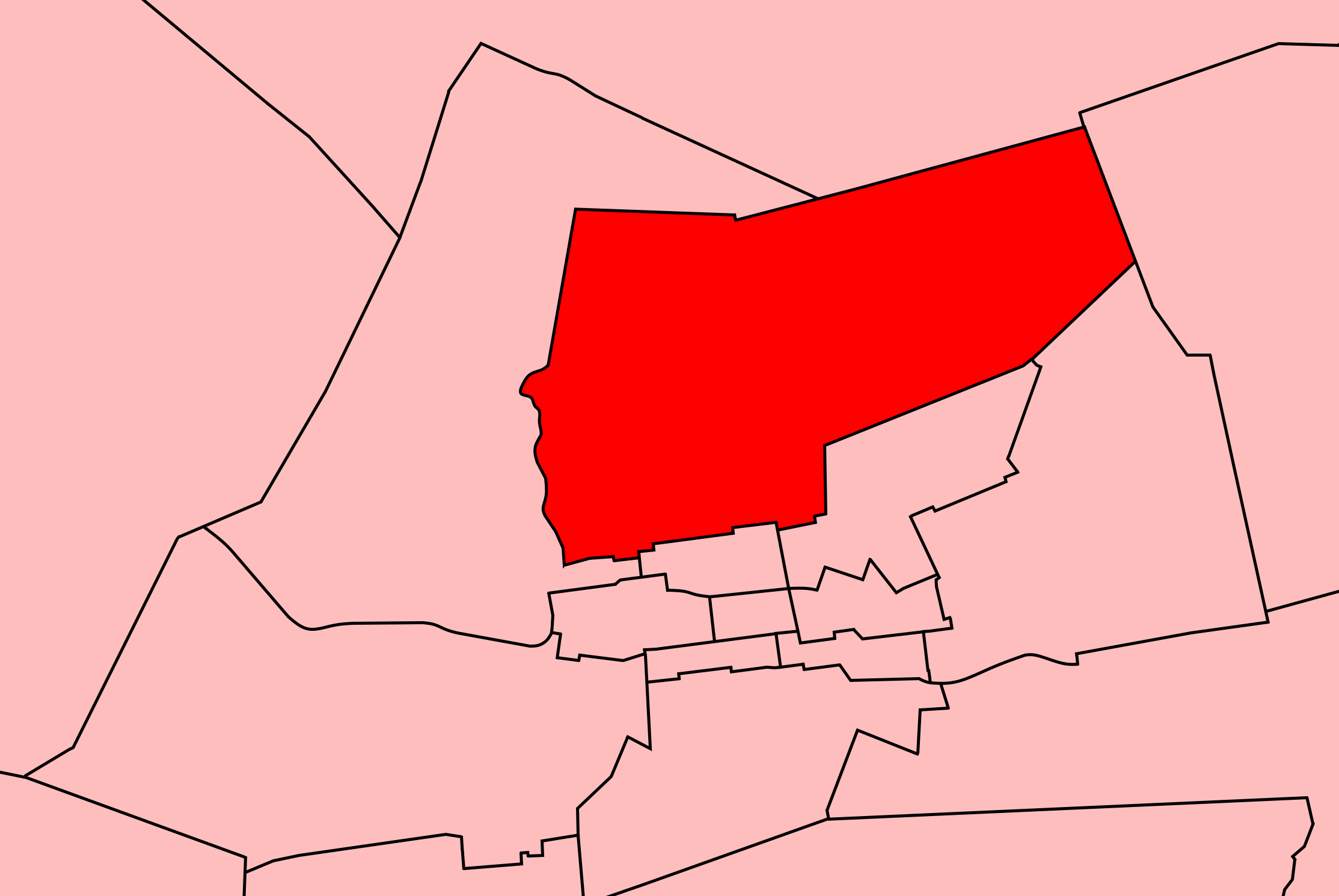
- Location of Parktown within Johannesburg (1915)
- Province: Transvaal
- Electorate: 18,010 (1989)

Former constituency
- Created: 1915
- Abolished: 1994
- Number of members: 1
- Last MHA: Zach de Beer (DP)
- Created from: Braamfontein
- Replaced by: Gauteng

Parktown was a constituency in the Transvaal Province of South Africa, which existed from 1915 to 1994. It covered parts of the inner northern suburbs of Johannesburg centred on the suburb of Parktown. Throughout its existence it elected one member to the House of Assembly and one to the Transvaal Provincial Council.

== Franchise notes ==
When the Union of South Africa was formed in 1910, the electoral qualifications in use in each pre-existing colony were kept in place. In the Transvaal Colony, and its predecessor the South African Republic, the vote was restricted to white men, and as such, elections in the Transvaal Province were held on a whites-only franchise from the beginning. The franchise was also restricted by property and education qualifications until the 1933 general election, following the passage of the Women's Enfranchisement Act, 1930 and the Franchise Laws Amendment Act, 1931. From then on, the franchise was given to all white citizens aged 21 or over. Non-whites remained disenfranchised until the end of apartheid and the introduction of universal suffrage in 1994.

== History ==
Like most of Johannesburg's northern suburbs, Parktown had a largely English-speaking and liberal electorate. Among other things, it was notable for being the first constituency to elect a woman - Leila Reitz - to serve in parliament, in 1933, at the first election after women were granted the vote. Reitz, like all her predecessors, was elected for the South African Party, and joined the United Party on its formation in 1934 - that party would supply her successors for thirty years after her resignation in 1943. In 1974, it was one of a handful of north Johannesburg seats to reject the UP in favour of the more outspokenly anti-apartheid Progressive Party, and in 1977 it elected its final MP - Zach de Beer, who at the time represented the Progressive Party's successor, the Progressive Federal Party. In 1988, de Beer became leader of the PFP, and went into the final whites-only general election as co-leader of the new Democratic Party, which aimed to unite the liberal opposition to the governing National Party - this met with only marginal success, but de Beer held his seat by a strong margin, and represented it until the end of apartheid.

== Members ==
Election	Member	Party
1915	Richard Feetham	Unionist
1920	Richard Feetham	Unionist
1921	Richard Feetham	SAP
1923 by	Willie Rockey	SAP
1924	Willie Rockey	SAP
1929	Willie Rockey	SAP
1933	Leila Reitz	SAP
1934	Leila Reitz	United
1938	Leila Reitz	United
1943	J. R. Stratford	United
1948	E. J. W. Henderson	United
1953	J. P. Cope	United
1958	J. P. Cope	United
1961	Samuel Emdin	United
1966	Samuel Emdin	United
1970	Samuel Emdin	United
1974	R. M. de Villiers	Progressive
1977	Zach de Beer	PFP
1981	Zach de Beer	PFP
1987	Zach de Beer	PFP
1989	Zach de Beer	Democratic
1994	Constituency abolished	

== Detailed results ==
=== Elections in the 1910s ===
General election 1915: Parktown
Party	Candidate	Votes	%	±%
Unionist	Richard Feetham	2,001	80.3	New
National	Oswald Pirow	299	12.0	New
Labour	A. W. Barlow	192	7.7	New
Majority		1,702	68.3	N/A
Turnout		2,492	74.4	N/A
Unionist win (new seat)				

=== Elections in the 1920s ===
General election 1920: Parktown
Party	Candidate	Votes	%	±%
Unionist	Richard Feetham	Unopposed		
Unionist hold				

General election 1921: Parktown
Party	Candidate	Votes	%	±%
South African	Richard Feetham	Unopposed		
South African hold				

Parktown by-election, 26 September 1923
Party	Candidate	Votes	%	±%
South African	Willie Rockey	1,797	77.8	N/A
Labour	J. George	508	22.0	New
Rejected ballots		6	0.2	N/A
Majority		1,289	55.8	N/A
Turnout		2,311	61.3	N/A
South African hold		Swing	N/A	

General election 1924: Parktown
Party	Candidate	Votes	%	±%
South African	Willie Rockey	1,985	78.2	N/A
Labour	G. Hills	550	21.7	New
Rejected ballots		3	0.1	N/A
Majority		1,435	56.5	N/A
Turnout		2,538	72.5	N/A
South African hold		Swing	N/A	

General election 1929: Parktown
Party	Candidate	Votes	%	±%
South African	Willie Rockey	1,702	84.1	+5.9
National	S. Kramer	309	15.3	New
Rejected ballots		13	0.6	+0.5
Majority		1,397	68.8	N/A
Turnout		2,024	70.0	−2.5
South African hold		Swing	N/A	

=== Elections in the 1930s ===
General election 1933: Parktown
Party	Candidate	Votes	%	±%
South African	Leila Reitz	Unopposed		
South African hold				

General election 1938: Parktown
Party	Candidate	Votes	%	±%
United	Leila Reitz	4,261	72.4	N/A
Independent	F. Brickman	1,181	20.1	New
Labour	F. A. W. Lucas	419	7.1	New
Rejected ballots		21	0.4	N/A
Majority		3,080	52.4	N/A
Turnout		5,882	75.8	N/A
United hold		Swing	N/A	
