= Chris Muller =

Boer general (1865–1945)

Christiaan Hendrik Muller
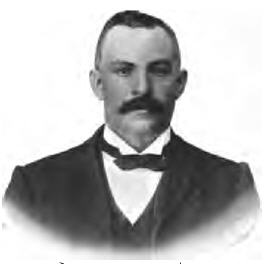
- Born: Christiaan Hendrik Muller; 4 January 1865; Adelaide, Somerset East district, Cape Colony
- Died: 14 January 1945 (aged 80); Johannesburg
- Occupations: Boer general, commander of the boer forces in the eastern transvaal, bank director,
- Predecessor: Ben Viljoen
- Parent(s): Helgard Muller (Mossel Bay, 1849-1918) and Anna Debora Pienaar (Potchefstroom, 1860-Potchefstroom, 1890)

Christiaan Hendrik Muller (Chris, "Ou Raaltjie", 4 January 1865 – 14 January 1945) was a Boer general during the Anglo-Boer War (1899–1902). He succeeded General Ben Viljoen as the sole leader of the Boer forces in the Eastern Transvaal after Viljoen was captured by British troops on 25 January 1902 and sent to St. Helena as a prisoner of war.

== Biography ==
Muller was born in the Cape Colony, South Africa, but grew up in the Orange Free State and later in Transvaal of the South African Republic where he fought in military campaigns against natives. In the Anglo-Boer War (1899–1902) he initially was a corporal in the Boksburg command, but later on he was promoted to general in virtue of his excellent weapon skills.

With General Ben Viljoen Muller led the Boers in the Battle of Helvetia on 29 December 1900, 10 km north of Machadodorp. They won a surprise victory over the British forces of Major Stapleton Lynch Cotton (1860–1928), attacking them at night from east and west. The Boers numbered about 580 men, while the British forces were only about 350 men strong, however boasting a 120mm (4.7-inch) naval cannon. Taking 235 prisoners of war, Muller later became particularly famous for the capture of this cannon, jokingly called the 'Lady Roberts'. On 12 June 1901 Muller and his troops overpowered about 350 men of the Australian 5th Victorian Mounted Rifles at Wilmansrust, Transvaal seizing ammunition, pom-pom guns, clothing and food, much needed by the Boers at that point.

He joined in the peace negotiations leading to the Treaty of Vereeniging in 1902 concluding the Anglo-Boer War. After the war, Muller was the director of the South African Landbank founded in 1912. In 1914 he was involved in the Maritz Rebellion but also was a member of the Parliament of South Africa for a number of years.

Muller died in 1945 in Johannesburg.

== Bibliography ==
- Grobler, J. E. H. The War Reporter: the Anglo-Boer war through the eyes of the burghers, Johannesburg: Jonathan Ball Publishers, 2004. ISBN 978-1-86842-186-2. Pages 99, 102, 114, 118, 120–121, 131, 134, 137, 145, 147, and 149.
- Breytenbach, J. H. (1973). Die stryd in Natal, Jan. – Feb. 1900 [The battle in Natal, Jan. – Feb. 1900]. Die Geskiedenis van die Tweede Vryheidsoorlog in Suid-Afrika, 1899–1902 (in Afrikaans). Vol. III. Pretoria: Die Staatsdrukker. ISBN 9780797012394. OCLC 612581136. Page 551 (assistant field cornet).
- Muller, Christiaan H.: Oorlogsherinneringe van generaal Chris. H. Muller, Nasionale Pers, Kaapstad 1936. In Afrikaans.
- Rosenthal, Eric (Ed.): Ensiklopedie van Suidelike Afrika, Frederick Warne, London, 1967. In Afrikaans.
- Schoeman JM (1972). "Muller, Christiaan Hendrik". In De Kock WJ, Krüger DW (eds.). Dictionary of South African Biography Vol II (1st ed.). Cape Town and Johannesburg: Tafelberg-Uitgewers. pp. 501–502. ISBN 0624003698. OCLC 1063845175.
