= Henry Malherbe =

French writer (1886–1958)

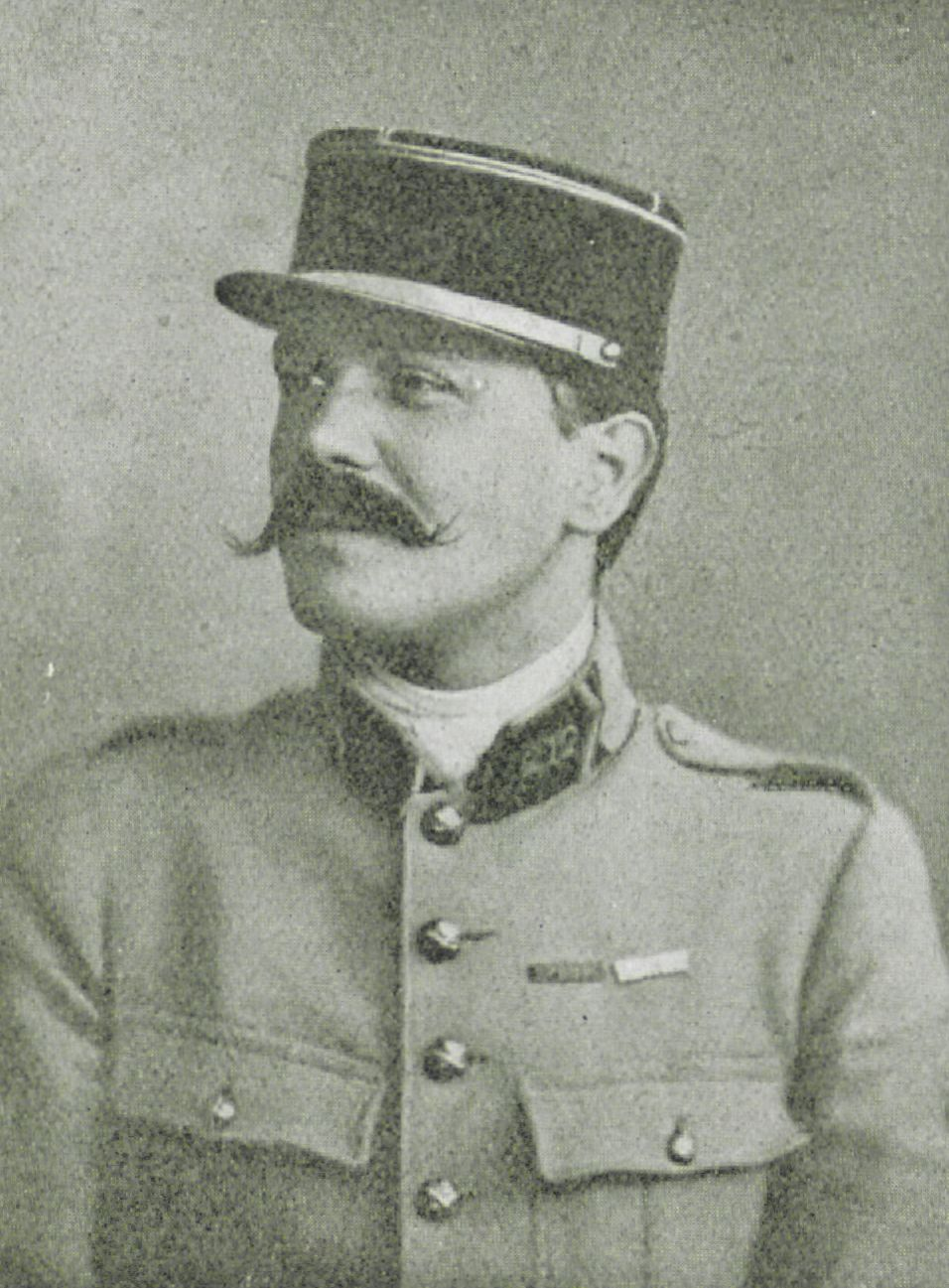
A portrait of Henri Émile Hermand Malherbe

Henri Émile Hermand Malherbe, also known as Henry Malherbe or Henry Croisilles (4 February 1886 (Note: Some sources give 1887 as his year of birth.) – 17 March 1958) was a French writer.

== Life and career ==
Malherbe was born in Bucharest. In Paris he wrote for Le Temps, the magazine Excelsior, and later for La Revue des vivants, ("organe de la génération de la guerre"), of which he was co-director with Henry de Jouvenel.

Malherbe fought in the First World War. In 1919 he was a co-founder and first president of the Association des écrivains combattants. (Note: The association’s website states that it consists of eminent men of letters who have carried arms for France. Its presidents after Malherbe include Roland Dorgelès, Claude Farrère, Maurice Genevoix and Erwan Bergot. In addition to Sir Winston Churchill as an honorary member, writers honoured by the association include Raymond Léopold Bruckberger, Jean Bernard, Paul Guth, Maurice Schumann and Pierre Messmer.) In 1953 the association established the Henry Malherbe Prize for essays in his honour. In 1917 Malherbe won the Prix Goncourt for the novel La flamme au poing, (literally, "The Flame in the Fist", published in English translation in 1918 as The Flame that is France). In 1918 the reviewer in the magazine North American Review wrote:

In The Flame That Is France we have to do with the work of a poet. That M. Malherbe writes in prose does not, of course, alter this fact. His musings over deep things, his fragmentary, intense picturings of action or character, have the meaning of poetry and are expressed in its language. … for his accounts of agony, grief, death, the grappling of the mind with horror – he finds words of bare simplicity. But always in the intensity, the impassioned calmness, of his realizations he is a poet.

=== Music ===
Malherbe took a particular interest in musical matters. His interview with Claude Debussy in 1911 is quoted extensively by the composer's biographer Léon Vallas; his criticisms of the Conservatoire de Paris for what he saw as its reactionary agenda and declining standards were reported in Britain and the US, in The Times and by Richard Aldrich, music critic of The New York Times. As a critic, Malherbe was less inclined than some of his colleagues to take new works at face value: he spotted, as many other critics did not, what he called "the heated eroticism" that lay below the seemingly "innocent neoclassical surface" of Francis Poulenc's 1924 ballet Les biches.

In his book about Bizet's Carmen, published in 1951, Malherbe offered what the journal Hommes et mondes called an analysis "of rare lucidity" of the origins, libretto and score of the opera, and presented hitherto unpublished information about the circumstances of the composer's early death; in this Malherbe raised the possibility that unhappy in love and in despair at "the conspiracy of critics who had condemned Carmen", Bizet may not have died of illness but had killed himself.

Malherbe's other books on music attracted some adverse comment from his contemporaries for his propensity to speculate about his subjects. His biography of Schubert (1949) was criticised in Music & Letters for "sketches circumstantially describing scenes for which we have not a shred of evidence. … M. Malherbe allows himself again and again to be carried away by his enthusiasm into writing bookstall fiction." His 1938 Richard Wagner révolutionnaire also suffered from some "rather fictitious" biography, according to the Revue De Musicologie.

=== Later years ===
Malherbes was appointed a Commandeur de la Légion d'Honneur in April 1953. He died in Paris in 1958, at the age of 72.

== Works ==
- Paul Hervieu E. Sansot & cie, 1912
- La Flamme au poing. A. Michel. 1917. "Henry Malherbe."
- Le Jugement dernier, Éditions de la Sirène, 1920
- La Rocque : un chef, des actes, des idées, suivi de documents sur les doctrines de la rénovation nationale Librairie Plon, 1934
- La passion de la Malibran, A. Michel, 1937
- Richard Wagner révolutionnaire A. Michel, 1938
- Aux États-Unis, printemps du monde, A. Michel, 1945
- Franz Schubert, son amour, ses amitiés, A. Michel, 1949
- Carmen Michel, 1951

=== English Translations ===
- The flame that is France. Translated by Van Wyck Brooks. New York: Century. 1918. "Henry Malherbe."

== Notes, references and sources ==
=== Sources ===
- Blake, Jody (1999). Le tumulte noir: modernist art and popular entertainment in Jazz-Age Paris, 1900-1930. Penn State Press. ISBN 978-0-271-01753-2.
- Vallas, Léon (1933). Claude Debussy: His Life and Works. Translated by Maire O'Brien; Grace O'Brien. Oxford: Oxford University Press. OCLC 458329645.
