= Leila Reitz =

South African politician (1887–1959)

Member of the House of Assembly of South Africa for Parktown
- In office 1933–1943

Personal details
- Born: 13 December 1887 Cape Town, Cape Colony
- Died: 27 December 1959 (aged 72) Wynberg, Cape Town, Province of the Cape of Good Hope, Union of South Africa
- Party: South African Party; United Party
- Spouse: Deneys Reitz (m. 1920, d. 1944)
- Children: 2
- Education: University of Cambridge; University of Cape Town

Leila Agnes Buissinné Reitz (née Wright, 13 December 1887 – 27 December 1959) was a South African politician who served as the first woman elected to Parliament in South Africa. She represented Parktown in the House of Assembly of South Africa from 1933 until 1943.

== Early life and education ==
Reitz was born to an English-speaking family in Cape Town in 1887. Her father was a doctor. She obtained an arts degree from the South African College and in 1910 was awarded a scholarship to study history at the University of Cambridge in England. In 1914 she returned to South Africa to lecture history at the University of Cape Town.

== Career ==
Following the passage of the Women's Enfranchisement Act, 1930 which granted white women aged over 21 the right to vote, Reitz contested the 1933 South African general election and was elected to represent Parktown, in Johannesburg. In her maiden speech, Reitz stated that poor white families "constitute a danger to the moral life of the moral life of our country, a danger to themselves, a danger to our social order, our national character, and, in the end a danger to white civilisation itself," emphasising that poor white citizens must be "lifted" up.

During her parliamentary career Reitz served as a member of the Interdepartmental Committee on Destitute, Neglected, Maladjusted and Delinquent Children and Young Persons and as Honorary Vice-President of the National Conference on Social Work. She spoke in the House of Assembly on the "adverse effect" that legal disabilities of married women had on the South African community. When the Aliens Act, 1937, was passed, Reitz and Bertha Solomon succeeded in securing an exemption from the need to register as "aliens" for South-African born women married to foreign nationals.

She left politics in 1943 to accompany her husband, Deneys Reitz, to London after he was appointed South African High Commissioner to the United Kingdom.

== Personal life ==
Reitz met the soldier and adventurer Deneys Reitz in Cape Town on his return from the Western Front in 1919. They married in 1920 and had two sons. Following her husband's death in 1944, she retired to Cape Town and died in 1959 aged 72. She is commemorated at Mariepskop alongside to her husband and younger son, Claude Michael.
