= Malherbe-sur-Ajon =

- Commune
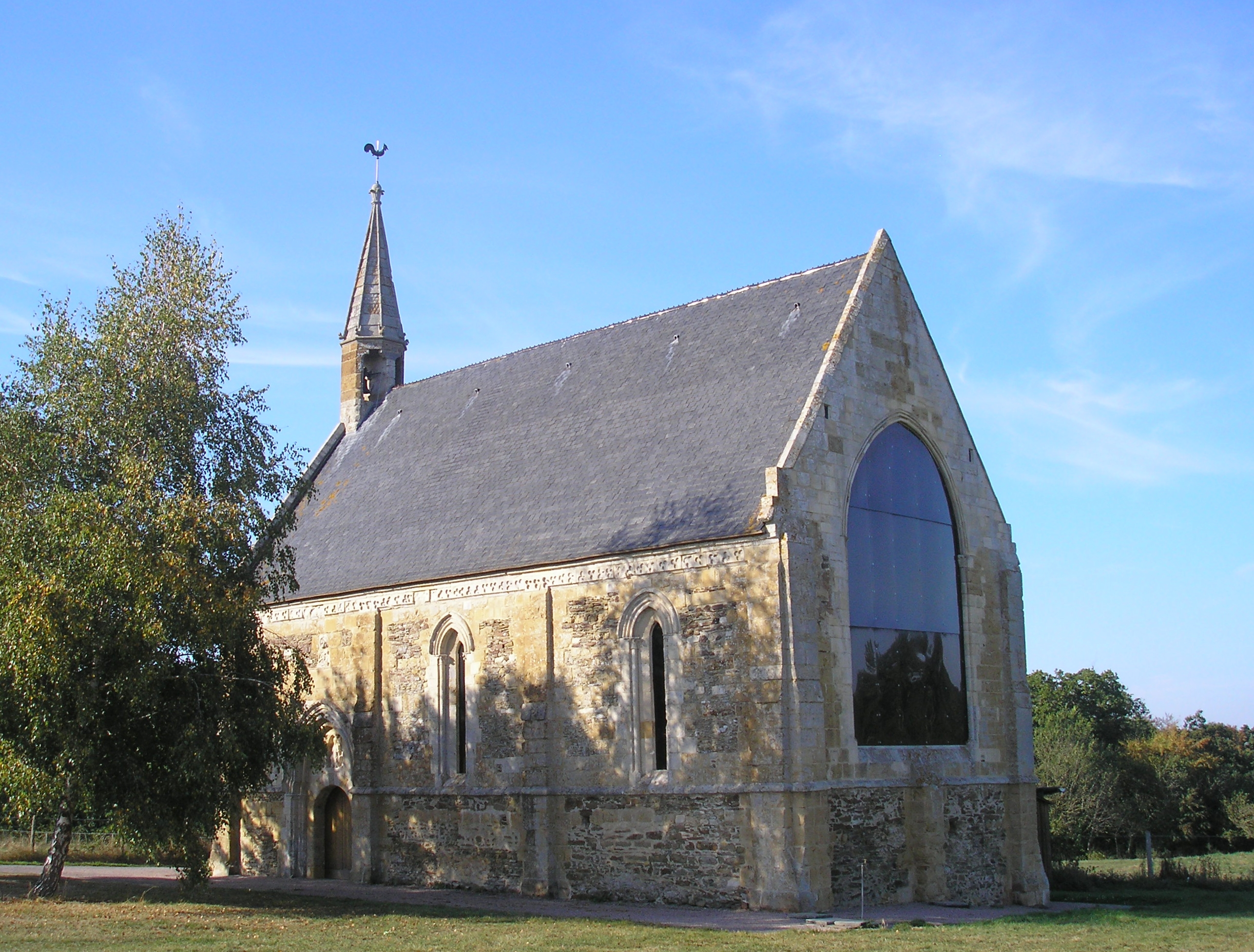
- The chapel in Banneville-sur-Ajon
- Location of Malherbe-sur-Ajon
- Location within France Location within Normandy
- Coordinates: 49°03′47″N 0°34′08″W
- Country: France
- Region: Normandy
- Department: Calvados
- Arrondissement: Vire
- Canton: Les Monts d'Aunay

Government
  - Mayor (2020–2026): Marcel Petre
- Area^{1}: 11.77 km^{2} (4.54 sq mi)
- Population (2023): 578
  - Density: 49.1/km^{2} (127/sq mi)
- Time zone: UTC+01:00 (CET)
  - Summer (DST): UTC+02:00 (CEST)
- INSEE/Postal code: 14037 /14260
- ^{1} French Land Register data, which excludes lakes, ponds, glaciers > 1 km^{2} (0.386 sq mi or 247 acres) and river estuaries.

Malherbe-sur-Ajon (French pronunciation: [malɛʁb syʁ aʒɔ̃]) is a commune in the department of Calvados, northwestern France. The municipality was established on 1 January 2016 by merger of the former communes of Banneville-sur-Ajon and Saint-Agnan-le-Malherbe.

== Geography ==
The commune is made up of the following collection of villages and hamlets, Malherbe-sur-Ajon, La Fêterie and Courqueret.

A single river the Ajon flows through the commune, In addition to two streams the Ruisseau de la Vallee Aubray and the Ruisseau de Buharet traverse the commune.

== See also ==
- Communes of the Calvados department
