= Suzanne Labin =

Suzanne Labin (6 May 1913 – 22 January 2001) was a French Socialist writer and political scientist, known particularly for her anti-communism, anti-totalitarianism and pro-democracy writings.

== Writings and reviews ==
In reviewing of her book The secret of democracy, Time magazine wrote:

Suzanne Labin writes with a hatpin. This young (thirtyish) French political scientist impales totalitarian myths and neutralist delusions, prods lukewarm intellectuals who rarely rise to the defense of democracy, or if they do, praise it with faint damns. Author Labin has small use for so-called thinkers who don the smoked glasses of a spurious objectivity and report that they can see no difference between Western freedom and Eastern tyranny except "shades of grey." She believes that it is worth restating the great central truth, or "secret," of democracy, i.e., that it is the first, last, best and only hope of 20th century mankind.

— Time

Dale Pontius wrote in the Annals of the American Academy of Political and Social Science:

Suzanne Labin's The Secret of Democracy, translated from the French, is one of the most thoughtful tracts of our time. Miss Labin has the happy facility of seeing the essential and finding rich and forceful expression. She asks the important questions about both democratic and totalitarian rule. Armed with acute use of the most penetrating literature on politics, and her own searching robes, she demolishes the dictatorships and demonstrates the calm realities of democracy. Political judgment, a use of psychoanalytic insights, and historic perspective join forces in Miss Labin with an ability to write memorable language.

— Dale Pontius

== Selected bibliography ==
- Stalin's Russia, London, Victor Gollancz Ltd., 1949. 492 pages. Translated by Edward Fitzgerald. With a Foreword by Arthur Koestler
- The Secret of Democracy, New York, The Vanguard Press, 1955. 258 pages
- The technique of Soviet propaganda, 1959. 31 pages
- The technique of Soviet propaganda. A study presented by the Subcommittee to Investigate the Administration of the Internal Security Laws of the Committee on the Judiciary, United States Senate, Eighty-sixth Congress, second session, Washington, U.S. Govt. Print. Off., 1960. v-38 pages
- The anthill: The human condition in Communist China, London, Stevens & Sons Limited - New York, Frederick A. Praeger, 1960. 443 pages. Translated by Edward Fitzgerald
- The unrelenting war: a study of the strategy and techniques of communist propaganda and infiltration, New York, American-Asian Educational Exchange, 1960. 47 pages. Edited by Moshe Decter. With an introduction by Charles Edison
- Counter attack;: A plan to win the political warfare of the Soviets, New York, American-Asian Educational Exchange, 1962. 52 pages
- Vietnam: an eye-witness account, Springfield, Crestwood Books, 1964. viii-98 pages. Introduction by Bryton Barron
- The techniques of Soviet propaganda: A study presented by the Subcommittee to Investigate the Administration of the Internal Security Act and other Internal Security Laws of the Committee on the Judiciary, United States Congress, Eighty-ninth Congress, first session, Washington, U.S. Govt. Print. Off., 1965. vi-64 pages
- Embassies of subversion, New York, American Afro-Asian Educational Exchange, 1965. 47 pages. Introduction by Thomas J. Dodd, U.S.S.
- Sellout in Vietnam?, Arlington, Crestwood Books, 1966. 98 pages. Introduction by Bryton Barron
- Red foxes in the chicken coop: How to Win against Communism, Arlington, Crestwood Books, 1966. 267 pages. Introduction by Eugene Lyons
- The techniques of Soviet propaganda: A study presented by the Subcommittee to Investigate the Administration of the Internal Security Act and other Internal Security Laws of the Committee on the Judiciary, United States Congress, Ninetieth Congress, first session, Washington, U.S. Govt. Print. Off., 1967. vi-63 pages
- Promise and reality: fifty years of Soviet-Russian 'achievements', London, European Freedom Council (British Section), 1967. 32 pages. Edited by John Graham with a foreword by Dowager Lady Birdwood
- Fifty years: The USSR versus the USA, New York, Twin Circle Publishing Company, 1968. 236 pages
- Vietnam assessment, Saigon, The Vietnam Council on Foreign Relations, 1972. 25 pages
- Hippies, drugs, and promiscuity, New Rochelle, Arlington House, 1972. 264 pages. Translated by Stephanie Winston
- Chile, the crime of resistance, Richmond, Foreign Affairs Pub. Co., 1982. xiii-282 pages
- Cultivating Thinking in English and the Language Arts, Crestwood Books, 1991
