= Titaÿna =

French journalist and writer

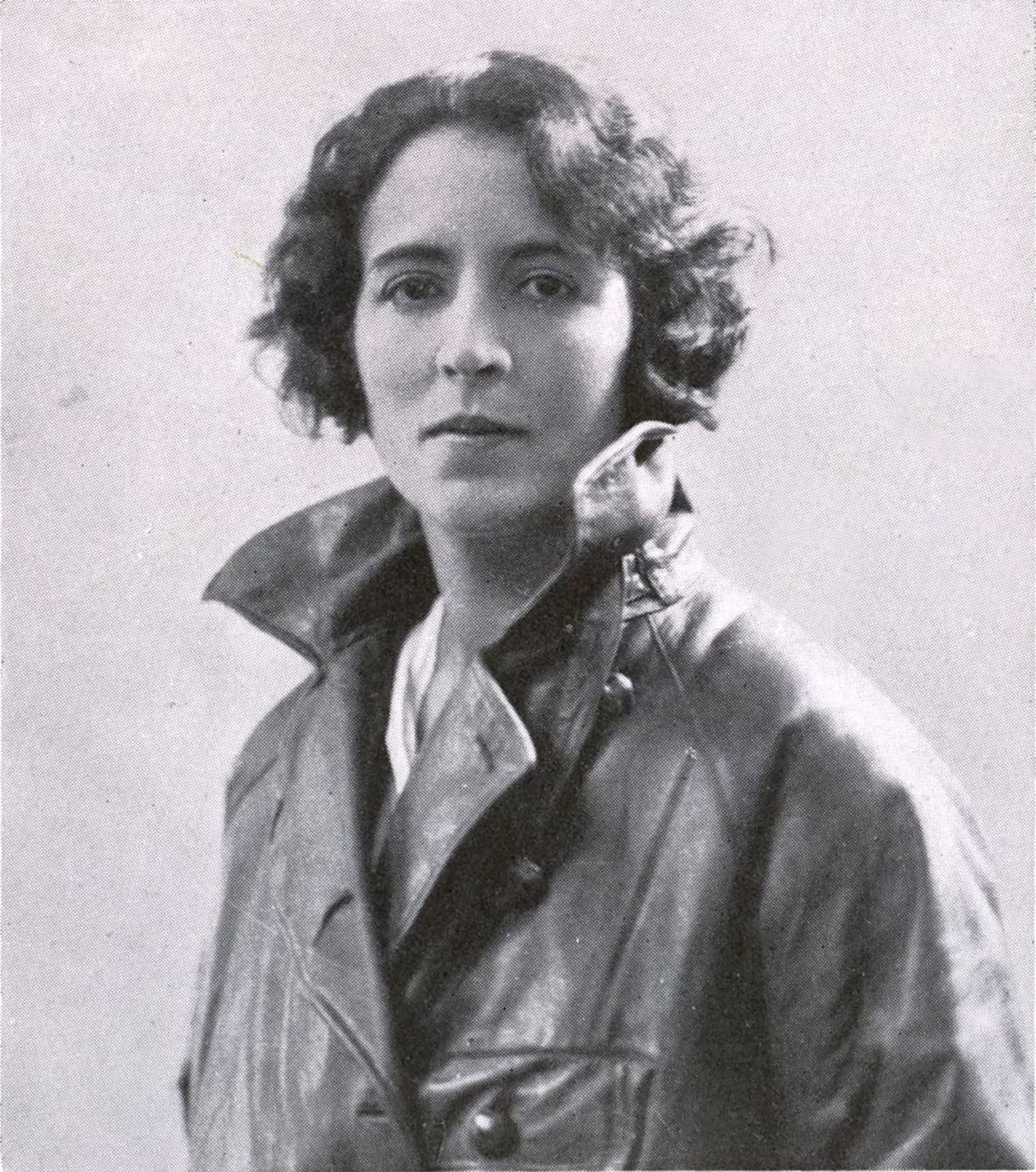
Photographs by Henri Manuel (1935)

Titaÿna (real name Élisabeth Sauvy, 22 November 1897 — 16 October 1966) was a French journalist and writer. She is considered one of the most significant female reporters in the first half of the 20th century.

== Biography ==
Sauvy was born in 1897 in Villeneuve-de-la-Raho in southern France. She was an older sister of the sociologist Alfred Sauvy. She moved to Paris, got married and very quickly divorced. She also started writing. The origin of the penname Titaÿna, which Sauvy was using, is unclear, though it is often hypothesized to originate from Catalan legends.

Between 1925 and 1939, Titaÿna was traveling around the world, mainly in Oceania, and at the same time she was reporting for Paris-soir. She also published a number of books based on her materials. Titaÿna received a license to fly an airplane, and is sometimes considered an aviation pioneer.

Titaÿna met and interviewed, among others, Adolf Hitler (in 1936), Benito Mussolini, Mustafa Kemal Atatürk, and Hubert Lyautey. However, at the end of the 1930s, her journalist career was already on the decline. After the German occupation of France in 1940 she took a collaborationalist stance. She was indeed accused in collaboration and after the war was imprisoned for about a year and left for the United States, where she lived until her death. Titaÿna died in 1966 in San Francisco.

In 1994, journalist Benoît Heimermann wrote a book about Titaÿna. The second edition was published in 2011.

== Books ==
- Simplement, Paris, Ernest Flammarion (1923).
- La bête cabrée, Paris, Aux Éditeurs associés - Les Éditions du Monde moderne, collection "le roman nouveau" (1925)m preface by Pierre Mac-Orlan.
- Mon tour du monde, Paris, Louis Querelle (1928).
- Voyage autour de ma maîtresse, Paris, Ernest Flammarion (1928).
- Voyage autour de mon amant, Paris, Ernest Flammarion (1928).
- Bonjour la Terre, Paris, Louis Querelle (1929).
- Loin, Paris, Ernest Flammarion (1929).
- La Caravane des morts, Paris, Éditions des Portiques (1930).
- Chez les mangeurs d'homme (Nouvelles-Hébrides), Paris, Éditions Duchartre, collection "Images" (1931), photographs by A.-P. Antoine and R. Lugeon.
- La Japonaise, Paris, Nouvelle société d'édition, collection "Elles" (1931).
- Nuits chaudes, Paris, Gallimard, collection "Succès" (1932).
- Une femme chez les chasseurs de têtes (Bornéo et Célèbes), Paris, Éditions de la nouvelle revue critique, collection "La Vie d'Aujourd'hui" (1934).
- Les ratés de l'aventure, Paris, Éditions de France (1938). Éditions Marchially (2020), ISBN 9791095582571.
- Une femme chez les chasseurs de têtes et autres reportages, Paris, Union Générale d’Éditions - 10/18, collection "Grands Reporters" (1985), preface by Francis Lacassin), ISBN 978-2081254251.
- Une femme chez les chasseurs de têtes, followed by Mes mémoires de reporter (inédit), Paris, Éditions Marchially (2016), ISBN 979-10-95582-02-1.

== Sources ==
- Heimermann, Benoît (2011). Titaÿna (in French). Arthaud. ISBN 978-2081254251.
