= Mabel Malherbe =

South African politician

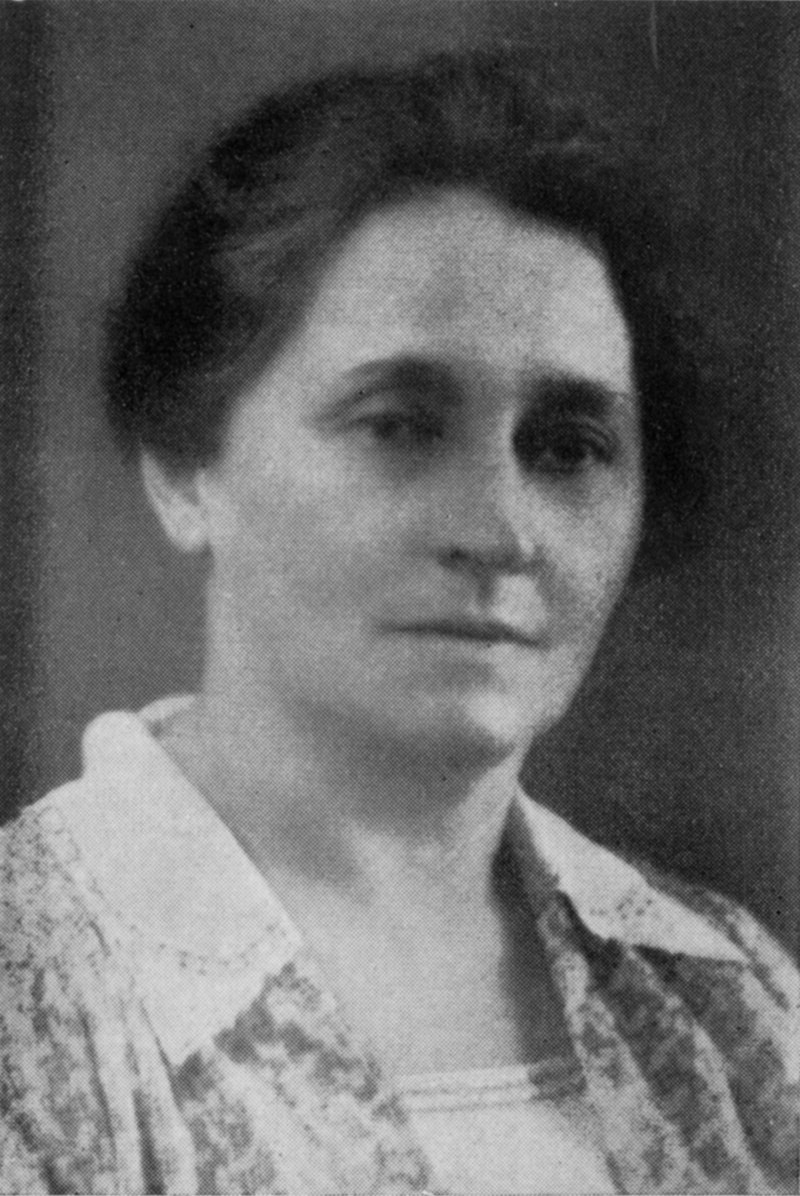

Personal details
- Born: 9 August 1879 Pretoria, Transvaal, South Africa
- Died: 1 February 1964 (aged 84)
- Party: National Party; United Party; Afrikaner Party

Mabel Catherine Malherbe (9 August 1879 – 1 February 1964) was a South African politician and activist for women's suffrage. She was the first woman mayor of Pretoria from 1931 to 1932. She also became the first woman to be a member of the South African Parliament in 1934.

== Biography ==
A descendant of George Rex of Knysna, Mable Catherine Rex was born on 9 August 1879. She spent her childhood first in Pretoria, South African Republic, then later in Rustenburg, before completing her studies in Rondebosch in the Cape Colony. Following the outbreak of the Second Boer War, she joined the Red Cross. It was whilst working for the Red Cross that she met Kenne Nicholaas De Kock Malherbe, whom she married in 1903.

With the help of Mrs Koopmans-De Wet, she left for the Netherlands where she spent three years training as a nurse. On her return to Pretoria in 1904, she began carrying out charity work and became an eminent member of a number of associations for Akfrikaner women, serving as the executive for the Federation of South African Women from 1917.

As a delegate for the South African National Council of women, Malherbe attended the International Woman's Conference in Geneva, Switzerland. In 1919 she founded the Afrikaans-Hollandse Leesunie and created an influential monthly womans magazine, Die Boerevrou, the first woman's magazine in afrikaans.

As a woman active in politics before women had the right to vote, she participated in the creation of the female branch of the National Party in the Transvaal in 1915. At the heart of the Nasionale Vroueparty (National Party, female branch), she campaigned for women's suffrage. In the context of the era, only white South African women would be given the right to vote, which happened in 1931.

Elected to the Municipal Council of Pretoria for six years, she became the first female mayor in South Africa (1931-1932). In June 1933, she was elected on to the provincial council of the Transvaal as a representative of the National Party. Later, in 1934, she became the first woman elected to the South African parliament, where she represented the district of Wonderboom. Loyal to James Barry Hertzog, she joined the United Party during the merger of the National Party and the South African Party. During her parliamentary term, she fought to not only advance the rights of women, but also for others marginalised due to difficult economic situations.

In 1939, she quit the United Party alongside Hertzog and other parliamentarians opposed to entering the war. Like them, she rejoined the National Party under the leadership of Daniel Francois Malan for a short time, before participating in the foundation of the Afrikaner Party alongside Nicolaas Havenga and those who still remained loyal to Hertzog.

In 1953, Mabel Catherine was awarded an honorary doctorate in literature from the University of Pretoria.

died on 1 February 1964.
