= Broekie van Broekhuizen =

South African rugby union player (b. 1872, d. 1953)

- Born: Herman Dirk van Broekhuizen; 17 June 1872 Ryse, Netherland
- Died: 4 August 1953 (aged 81)
- School: Grey College

Rugby union career
- Position: Forward
Provincial / State sides
Years	Team	Apps	(Points)
1896	Western Province	0	(0)
International career
Years	Team	Apps	(Points)
1896	South Africa	1	(0)
- Correct as of 27 May 2019

Broekie van Broekhuizen (17 June 1872 – 4 August 1953) was a South African international rugby union player who played as a forward.

He made 1 appearance for South Africa against the British Lions in 1896.
