= Saint-Agnan-le-Malherbe =

- Part of Malherbe-sur-Ajon
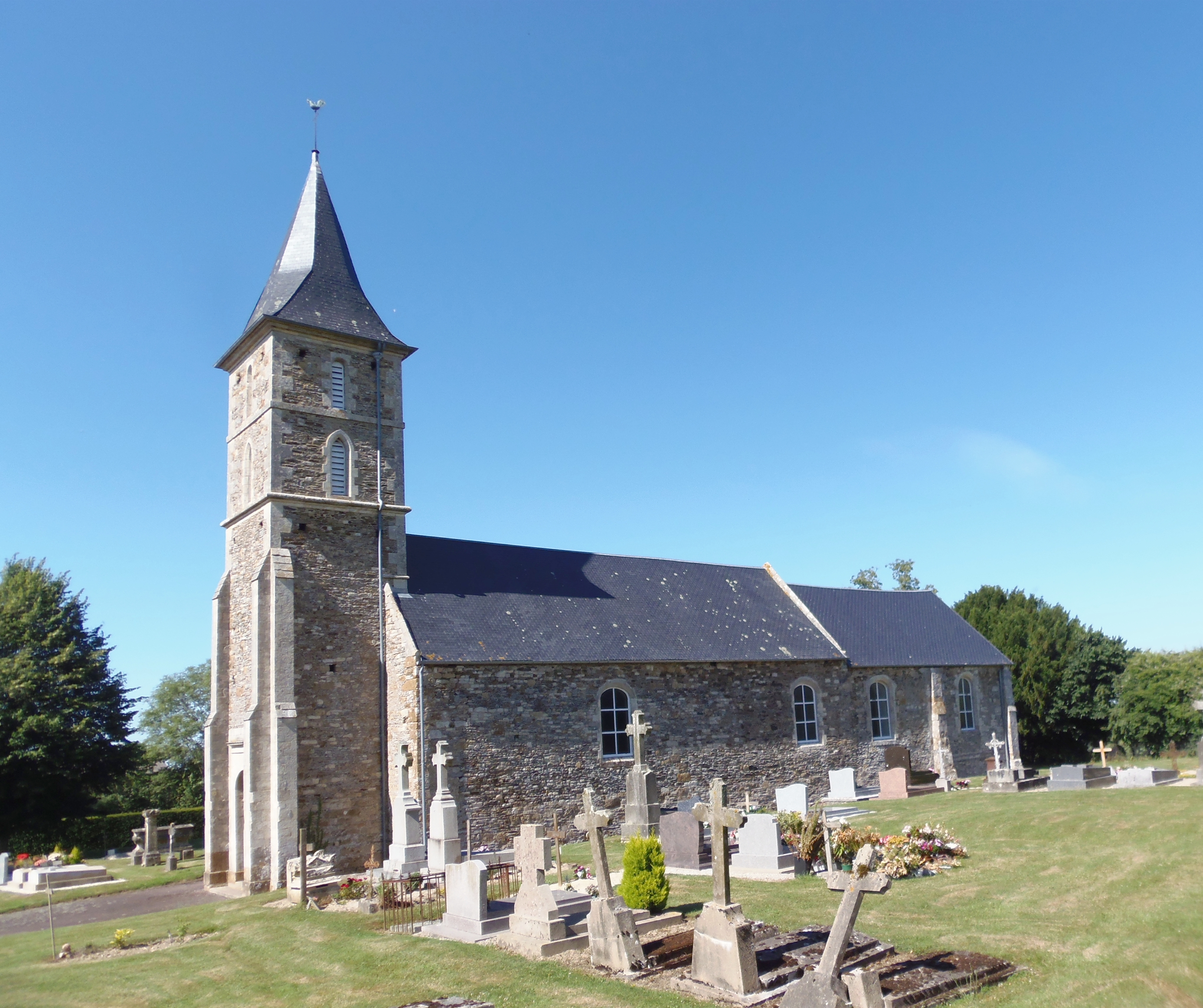
- Location of Saint-Agnan-le-Malherbe
- Location within France Location within Normandy
- Coordinates: 49°02′31″N 0°34′53″W
- Country: France
- Region: Normandy
- Department: Calvados
- Arrondissement: Vire
- Canton: Les Monts d'Aunay
- Commune: Malherbe-sur-Ajon
- Area^{1}: 6.14 km^{2} (2.37 sq mi)
- Elevation: 200 m (660 ft)
- Highest elevation: 228 m (748 ft)
- Lowest elevation: 114 m (374 ft)
- Population (2019): 127
  - Density: 20.7/km^{2} (53.6/sq mi)
- Time zone: UTC+01:00 (CET)
  - Summer (DST): UTC+02:00 (CEST)
- Postal code: 14260
- ^{1} French Land Register data, which excludes lakes, ponds, glaciers > 1 km^{2} (0.386 sq mi or 247 acres) and river estuaries.

Saint-Agnan-le-Malherbe (French pronunciation: [sɛ̃.t‿aɲɑ̃ lə malɛʁb]) is a former commune in the Calvados department in the Normandy region in northwestern France. On 1 January 2016, it was merged into the new commune of Malherbe-sur-Ajon.

== See also ==
- Communes of the Calvados department
