= Third cabinet of John Vorster =

Third Vorster Cabinet
- 5th Cabinet of the Republic of South Africa (since the 1961 Constitution)
- 1974–1978
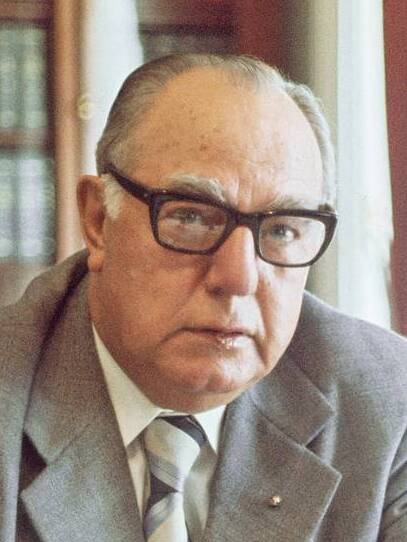
- Johannes Vorster (1960)
- Date formed: 29 April 1974
- Date dissolved: 9 October 1978 (4 years, 5 months and 10 days)

People and organisations
- State President: Jacobus Fouché (until 1975); Jan de Klerk (acting, 1975); Nicolaas Diederichs (from 1975); Marais Viljoen (acting, 1978)
- Prime Minister: Johannes Vorster
- Member parties: National Party
- Status in legislature: Majority
- Opposition parties: United Party (until 1977); Progressive Federal Party
- Opposition leaders: De Villiers Graaff (until 1977); Colin Eglin (from 1977)

History
- Elections: 1974 election; 1977 election
- Predecessor: Vorster II
- Successor: Botha I

== Cabinet ==
Ministry/Portfolio	Minister/Incumbent	Start	End
Prime Minister	Johannes Vorster	29 April 1974	10 October 1978
Foreign Affairs	Hilgard Muller; Pik Botha	29 April 1974; May 1977	May 1977; 10 October 1978
Defense	Pieter Botha	29 April 1974	10 October 1978
Finance	Nicolaas Diederichs; Owen Horwood	29 April 1974; February 1975	February 1975; 10 October 1978
Home Affairs	Connie Mulder; Alwyn Schlebusch	29 April 1974; August 1978	August 1978; 10 October 1978
Information	Connie Mulder	29 April 1974	August 1978
Justice, Police and Prisons	Jimmy Kruger	29 April 1974	10 October 1978
Transport	Lourens Muller	29 April 1974	10 October 1978
Labour	Marais Viljoen; Stephanus Petrus Botha	29 April 1974; 22 January 1976	22 January 1976; 10 October 1978
Mining	Piet Koornhof; Stephanus Petrus Botha	29 April 1974; 22 January 1976	22 January 1976; 10 October 1978
Immigration	Piet Koornhof; Alwyn Schlebusch	29 April 1974; 22 January 1976	22 January 1976; 10 October 1978
Sport and Recreation	Piet Koornhof	29 April 1974	10 October 1978
Economic Affairs	Owen Horwood; Chris Heunis	29 April 1974; February 1975	February 1975; 10 October 1978
Bantu Administration, Education and Development from January 1978: Bantu Education and Development	Michiel Coenraad Botha; Willem Cruywagen	29 April 1974; January 1978	January 1978; 10 October 1978
Plural Development	Connie Mulder	January 1978	10 October 1978
National Education	Johannes van der Spuy; Piet Koornhof; Willem Cruywagen	29 April 1974; 22 January 1976; January 1978	22 January 1976; January 1978; 10 October 1978
Public Works	Abraham du Plessis; Alwyn Schlebusch	29 April 1974; 1976	1975; 10 October 1978
Agriculture	Hendrik Schoeman	29 April 1974	10 October 1978
Environment, Water Affairs and Forestry	Stephanus Petrus Botha; Abraham Raubenheimer	29 April 1974; 1976	1976; 10 October 1978
Social Welfare and Pensions	Johannes van der Spuy; Frederik Willem de Klerk	29 April 1974; January 1978	January 1978; 10 October 1978
Post, Telegraphs and Telecommunication	Marais Viljoen; Johannes van der Spuy; Frederik Willem de Klerk	29 April 1974; 22 January 1976; January 1978	22 January 1976; January 1978; 10 October 1978
Health	Schalk van der Merwe	29 April 1974	10 October 1978
Planning and Statistics	Jannie Loots; Schalk van der Merwe	29 April 1974; 23 January 1976	23 January 1976; 10 October 1978
Tourism and Indian Population Affairs	Chris Heunis; Marais Steyn	29 April 1974; February 1975	February 1975; 10 October 1978
Community Development	Abraham du Plessis; Marais Steyn	29 April 1974; February 1975	February 1975; 10 October 1978
Coloured Affairs, Rehoboth Homeland and Nama; 1976: Coloured Affairs	Schalk van der Merwe; Hennie Smit	29 April 1974; 1976	1976; 10 October 1978
