= First cabinet of P. W. Botha =

First Botha Cabinet
- 6th Cabinet of the Republic of South Africa (since the 1961 Constitution)
- 1978–1984
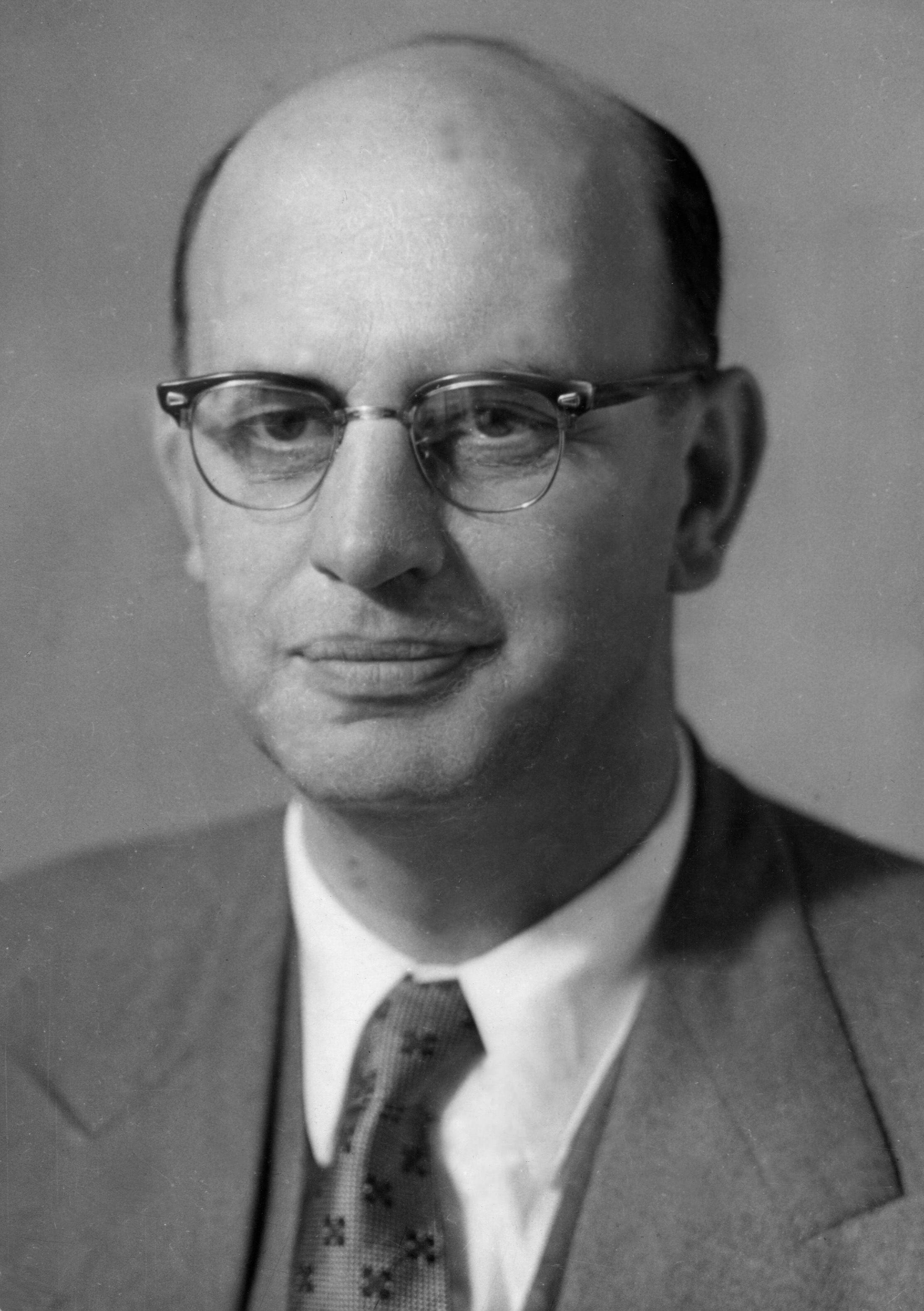
- Pieter Botha (1962)
- Date formed: 9 October 1978
- Date dissolved: 3 September 1984 (5 years, 10 months and 25 days)

People and organisations
- State President: Johannes Vorster (until 1979); Marais Viljoen (from 1979)
- Prime Minister: Pieter Botha
- Member parties: National Party
- Status in legislature: Majority
- Opposition parties: Progressive Federal Party
- Opposition leaders: Frederik van Zyl Slabbert

History
- Election: 1981 election
- Predecessor: Vorster III
- Successor: Botha II

When Pieter Botha first became Prime Minister of South Africa in 1978, he appointed members of the National Party to all positions in his first cabinet.

== Cabinet ==
Portfolio	Minister	Party	Period
Prime Minister	Pieter Botha	NP	1978–1984
Vice President	Alwyn Schlebusch	NP	1981–1984
Minister of Agriculture and Fisheries	Hendrik Schoeman; Sarel Hayward	NP	1978–1982; 1982–1984
Minister of Constitutional Development	Chris Heunis	NP	1982–1984
Minister of Cooperation and Development	Piet Koornhof	NP	1978–1984
Minister of Defense	Pieter Botha; Magnus Malan	NP	1978–1980; 1980–1984
Minister of Education and Training	Ferdi Hartzenberg; Dawie de Villiers	NP	1979–1982; 1982
Minister of (National) Education	Gerrit Viljoen	NP	1980–1984
Minister of Environment and Energy	Chris Heunis; Frederik de Klerk; Braam Raubenheimer; Cornelis van der Merwe; Sarel Hayward	NP	1978–1979; 1979–1980; 1980; 1981–1982; 1982–1984
Minister of Finance	Owen Horwood	NP	1978–1984
Minister of Foreign Affairs	Pik Botha	NP	1978–1984
Minister of Health	Schalk van der Merwe	NP	1978
Minister of Home Affairs	Alwyn Schlebusch; Chris Heunis; Frederik de Klerk	NP	1978–1980; 1980–1982; 1982–1984
Minister of Justice	Jimmy Kruger; Alwyn Schlebusch; Kobie Coetsee	NP	1978–1979; 1979–1980; 1980–1984
Minister of Labour	Fanie Botha	NP	1979–1983
Minister of Mining	Fanie Botha; Frederik de Klerk; Pietie du Plessis; Daniel Steyn	NP	1978–1979; 1979–1982; 1982–1983; 1983–1984
Minister of Plural Development	Stephanus François Kotzé	NP	1980–1984
Minister of Police and Prisons; Minister of Law and Order	Jimmy Kruger; Louis le Grange	NP	1978–1979; 1979–1984
Minister of Public Works	Louis Le Grange; Andries Treurnicht	NP	1978–1979; 1979–1980
Minister of Posts and Telegraphs	Henni Smit; Frederik de Klerk; Lourens Munnik	NP	1978; 1978–1979; 1982–1984
Minister of Sport and Recreation	Piet Koornhof; Frederik de Klerk	NP	1978; 1978–1979
Minister of Statistics	Andries Treurnicht	NP	1979–1982
Minister of Tourism	Louis Le Grange; Andries Treurnicht	NP	1978–1979; 1979–1980
Minister of Trade and Industry	Dawie de Villiers	NP	1980–1984
Minister of Transport	Lourens Muller; Chris Heunis; Hendrik Schoeman	NP	1978–1979; 1979–1980; 1980–1984
Minister of Water and Forestry	Braam Raubenheimer	NP	1978–1980
Minister of Welfare; Minister of Health, Welfare and Pensions	Frederik de Klerk; Schalk van der Merwe; Lourens Munnik; Cornelis van der Merwe	NP	1978; 1978–1979; 1980–1982; 1982–1984
