= Second Botha cabinet =

Second Botha cabinet may refer to two South African cabinets:

- Second cabinet of Louis Botha (1915–1920)
- Second cabinet of P. W. Botha (1984–1989)

== See also ==
- First Botha cabinet
