= Frank Waring =

South African politician and rugby union player

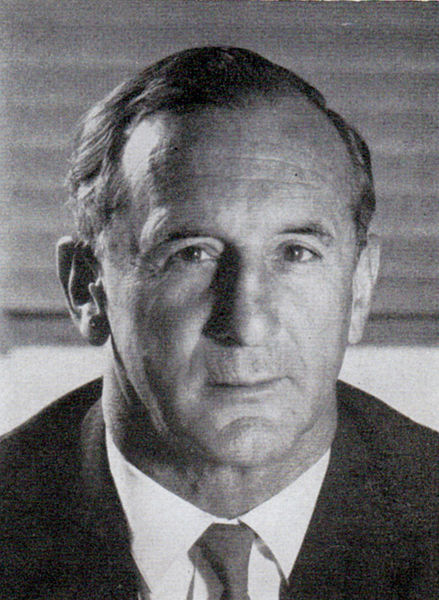
- Full name: Frank Walter Waring
- Born: 7 November 1908 Cape Town, South Africa
- Died: 24 January 2000 (aged 91) Cape Town, South Africa
- Height: 1.77 m (5 ft 10 in)
- Weight: 69 kg (152 lb)
- University: University of Cape Town
- Occupation: Politician

Rugby union career
- Position: Centre
Provincial / State sides
Years	Team	Apps	(Points)
- Western Province
International career
Years	Team	Apps	(Points)
1931–33	South Africa	7	(6)

Frank Walter Waring (7 November 1908 – 24 January 2000) was a South African politician who served as a cabinet minister during the 1960s and 1970s. He was also an international rugby union player in the 1930s.

== Early life ==
Waring attended Wynberg Boys' High School and South African College Schools while growing up in Cape Town.

== Rugby union ==
An attacking centre, Waring played varsity rugby for the University of Cape Town and was a Western Province representative. He was capped seven times for the Springboks during the early 1930s. His first international call up was on their 1931–32 tour of Britain and Ireland, where he featured as an outside centre in two of the four international matches, scoring a try on debut against Ireland. He got his next opportunity when the Wallabies visited South Africa in 1933 and he appeared in all five Test matches, as the Springboks beat the tourists 3–2.

== Politics ==
Waring represented the Orange Grove constituency in the House of Assembly between 1943 and 1958. At first a member of the United Party, Waring switched to the National Party to contest a 1962 by–election for the Vasco constituency, and was elected unopposed. He held several ministerial portfolios during the prime ministership of Hendrik Verwoerd and along with Alfred Ernest Trollip was one of only two native English speakers to serve on his cabinet. When Verwoerd was assassinated in 1966, Waring helped apprehend the assassin Dimitri Tsafendas by getting him in a neck-lock. He was later Minister of Indian Affairs and Minister of Sports under John Vorster.

== Personal life ==
Waring was married to newspaper columnist Joyce Waring (nee Barlow). One of their daughters, Adrienne Koch, served as mayor of Paarl. He died of complications from Alzheimer's disease in 2000, aged 91.

== See also ==
- List of South Africa national rugby union players
