= First Botha cabinet =

First Botha cabinet may refer to two South African cabinets:

- First cabinet of Louis Botha (1910–1915)
- First cabinet of P. W. Botha (1978–1984)

== See also ==
- Second Botha cabinet
