= Second cabinet of P. W. Botha =

Second Botha Cabinet
- 7th Cabinet of the Republic of South Africa (since the 1961 Constitution)
- 1984–1989
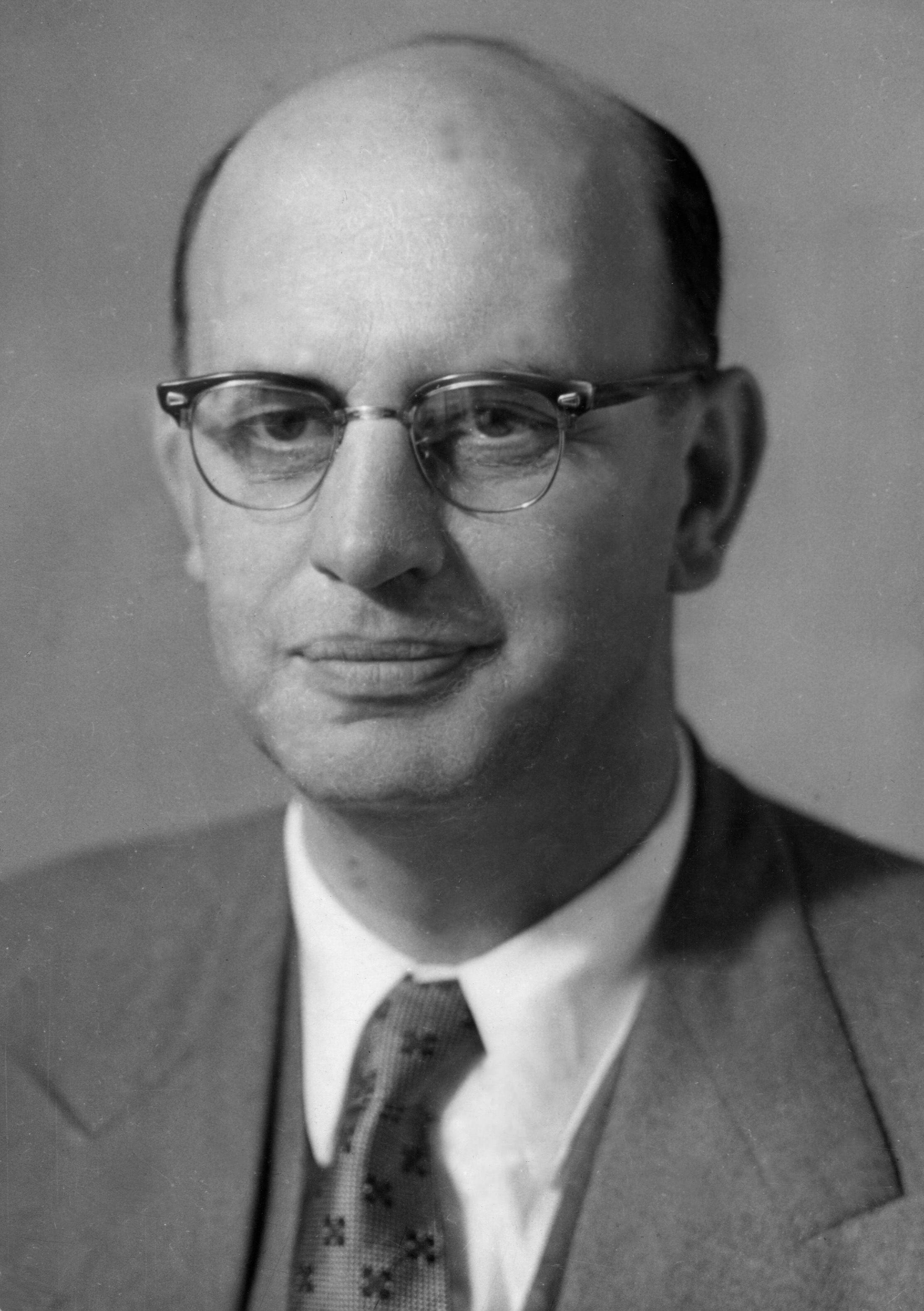
- Pieter Botha (1962)
- Date formed: 3 September 1984
- Date dissolved: 14 August 1989 (4 years, 11 months and 11 days)

People and organisations
- State President: Pieter Botha; Chris Heunis (acting)
- No. of ministers: 19 ministers
- Member parties: National Party
- Status in legislature: Majority
- Opposition parties: Conservative Party
- Opposition leaders: Andries Treurnicht

History
- Election: 1987 election
- Predecessor: Botha I
- Successor: De Klerk

The second cabinet of Pieter Botha was formed following his assumption of the position of State President of South Africa on 3 September 1984. It was dissolved on 6 September 1989, after Botha's incapacitation following a stroke in January of that year. After Botha's resignation in February, he was replaced by Chris Heunis as acting state president for the remaining few months of the cabinet's term. Heunis was replaced with Frederik de Klerk, who was elected leader of the National Party on 2 February and inaugurated as state president on 20 September.

== Cabinet ==
Ministry/Portfolio	Minister/Incumbent	Party	Period
State President of South Africa	Pieter Botha; Chris Heunis (acting)	NP	1984–89; 1989
Minister of Agriculture and Fisheries	Greyling Wentzel	NP	1984–89
Minister of Constitutional Development and Planning	Chris Heunis	NP	1984–89
Minister of Defence	Magnus Malan	NP	1984–89
Minister of Economic Affairs and Technology	Daniel Steyn	NP	1984–89
Minister of Education and Culture	Piet Clase	NP	1984–89
Minister of Environment and Water Affairs	Gert Kotze	NP	1984–89
Minister of Finance	Barend du Plessis	NP	1984–89
Minister of Foreign Affairs	Pik Botha	NP	1984–89
Minister of Health and Population Development	Willie van Niekerk	NP	1984–89
Minister of Home Affairs	Frederik Willem de Klerk; Stoffel Botha	NP	1984–1985; 1985–1989
Minister of Justice	Kobie Coetsee	NP	1984–89
Minister of Law and Order	Adriaan Vlok	NP	1984–89
Minister of Manpower	Pietie du Plessis	NP	1984–89
Minister of Mining and Energy	Daniel Steyn	NP	1984–89
Minister of Posts and Telecommunications	L.A.P.A. Munnik	NP	1984–86
Minister of Public Works and Land Affairs	L.A.P.A. Munnik	NP	1984–86
Minister of Trade and Industry	Dawie de Villiers	NP	1984–89
Minister of Transport	Eli Louw	NP	1984–89
Minister of Indian Affairs	Amichand Rajbansi	NPP	1984–89
Minister of Coloureds' Affairs	Allan Hendrickse	LP	1984–89
