= Orange Grove (House of Assembly of South Africa constituency) =

- Former constituency for the South African House of Assembly
- Province: Transvaal
- Electorate: 15,019 (1977)

Former constituency
- Created: 1938
- Abolished: 1981
- Number of members: 1
- Last MHA: Rupert Lorimer (PFP)

Orange Grove was a constituency in the Transvaal Province of South Africa, which existed from 1938 to 1981. It covered parts of the inner northern suburbs of Johannesburg centred on the suburb of Orange Grove. Throughout its existence it elected one member to the House of Assembly and one to the Transvaal Provincial Council.

== Franchise notes ==
When the Union of South Africa was formed in 1910, the electoral qualifications in use in each pre-existing colony were kept in place. In the Transvaal Colony, and its predecessor the South African Republic, the vote was restricted to white men, and as such, elections in the Transvaal Province were held on a whites-only franchise from the beginning. The franchise was also restricted by property and education qualifications until the 1933 general election, following the passage of the Women's Enfranchisement Act, 1930 and the Franchise Laws Amendment Act, 1931. From then on, the franchise was given to all white citizens aged 21 or over. Non-whites remained disenfranchised until the end of apartheid and the introduction of universal suffrage in 1994.

== History ==
Like most of Johannesburg's northern suburbs, Orange Grove had a largely English-speaking and liberal electorate. Its first MP, Colin Bain-Marais, had previously represented Boksburg North as an independent, but stood for the United Party in Orange Grove. So too did his successor, former Springbok Frank Waring, who would later defect to the National Party and become one of their first natively English-speaking cabinet ministers. However, that was after his time in Orange Grove, which he left in 1958 giving way to Etienne George Malan. In 1974, Malan was one of several inner-city United Party MPs to be defeated by challengers from the more liberal Progressive Party - in this case, Rupert Lorimer, who would represent the seat for the remainder of its existence. When the seat was abolished in 1981, Lorimer stood unsuccessfully in Durban North, but was eventually able to return as MP for nearby Bryanston in 1987.

== Members ==
Election	Member	Party
1938	Colin Bain-Marais	United
1943	Frank Waring	United
1948	Frank Waring	United
1953	Frank Waring	United
1958	E. G. Malan	United
1961	E. G. Malan	United
1966	E. G. Malan	United
1970	E. G. Malan	United
1974	Rupert Lorimer	Progressive
1977	Rupert Lorimer	PFP
1981	Constituency abolished	

== Detailed results ==
=== Elections in the 1930s ===
General election 1938: Orange Grove
Party	Candidate	Votes	%	±%
United	Colin Bain-Marais	4,549	68.2	New
Dominion	P. A. Moore	1,783	26.7	New
Labour	J. Liebman	311	4.7	New
Rejected ballots		30	0.4	N/A
Majority		2,766	41.5	N/A
Turnout		6,673	78.8	N/A
United win (new seat)				
