= 245th Siege Battery, Royal Garrison Artillery =

245th Siege Battery, RGA
- Cap Badge of the Royal Regiment of Artillery
- Active: 29 August 1916–1919
- Country: United Kingdom
- Branch: British Army
- Role: Siege Artillery
- Part of: Royal Garrison Artillery
- Garrison/HQ: Harwich
- Engagements: Battle of Messines; Third Battle of Ypres; German Spring Offensive; Second Battle of Villers-Bretonneux; Hundred Days Offensive

245th Siege Battery was a heavy howitzer unit of Britain's Royal Garrison Artillery (RGA) raised in Essex and Suffolk during World War I. It saw active service on the Western Front at Messines and Ypres, against the German Spring Offensive, at Villers-Bretonneux and in the final Allied Hundred Days Offensive.

== Mobilisation ==
On the outbreak of war in August 1914, units of the part-time Territorial Force (TF) were invited to volunteer for Overseas Service and the majority of the Essex and Suffolk Royal Garrison Artillery did so. This unit had mobilised as part of No 14 (Essex & Suffolk) Coastal Fire Command at Landguard Fort, charged with defending the Haven ports of Harwich, Felixstowe and Ipswich and the associated naval base. By October 1914, the campaign on the Western Front was bogging down into Trench warfare and there was an urgent need for batteries of siege artillery to be sent to France. The WO decided that the TF coastal gunners were well enough trained to take over many of the duties in the coastal defences, releasing Regular RGA gunners for service in the field. Soon the TF RGA companies that had volunteered for overseas service were also supplying trained gunners to RGA units serving overseas and providing cadres to form complete new units.

In August 1915 Harwich was chosen as one of the depots for forming these units, under the command of Major G.W. Horsfield of the Essex & Suffolk RGA.The rest of the personnel were returning wounded Regulars, men of the Special Reserve, 'Kitchener's Army' volunteers, 'Lord Derby men' and later conscripts. 245th Siege Battery, RGA, was formed at Harwich on 29 August 1916 with a cadre of 3 officers and 78 ORs from the Essex & Suffolk RGA under Army Council Instruction 1739 of 7 September 1916.

== Western Front ==
=== Messines ===
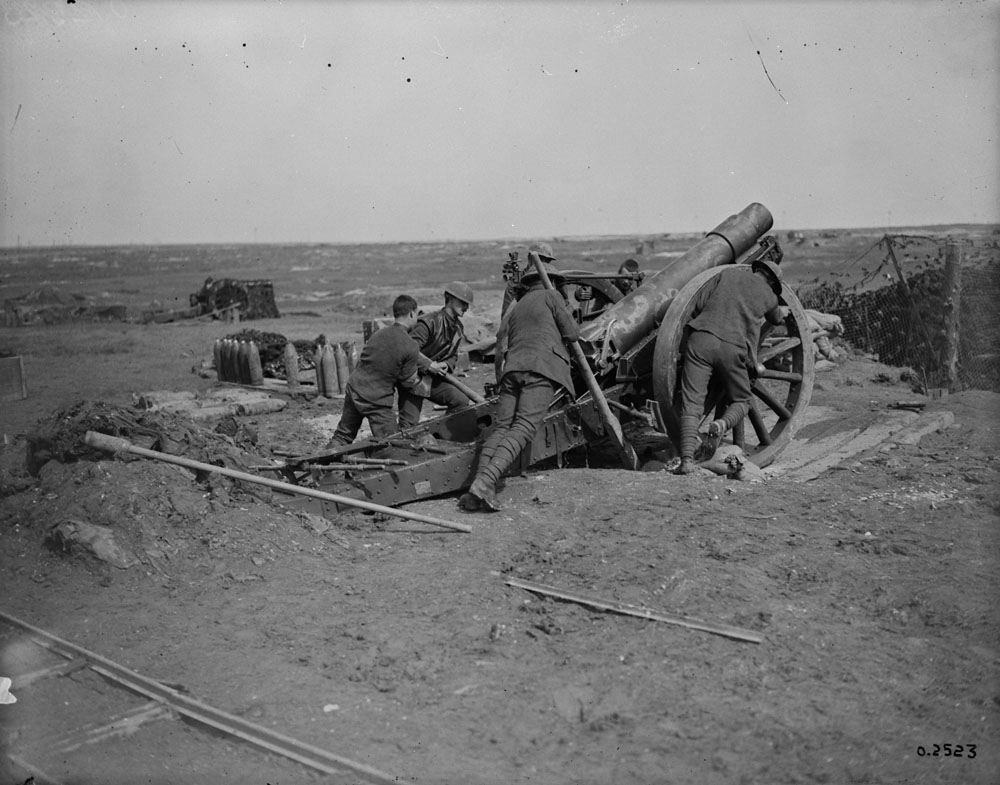
Crew positioning a 6-inch 26 cwt howitzer.

The battery went out to the Western Front on 29 January 1917, equipped with four 6-inch 26 cwt howitzers and joined 52nd Heavy Artillery Group (HAG) serving under Second Army in the Ypres sector.

It was a quiet period in this sector: 52nd HAG at Bac St Maur occasionally shelled Fleurbaix south of Armentières, provided cover for infantry raids, or carried out counter-battery (CB) tasks. Second Army was gathering artillery for the Battle of Messines and on 24 May the battery transferred to 17th HAG. At this point the battery was under the command of Major J.V. Verschoyle-Campbell and its officers included 2/Lt (later Maj-Gen) Harold Arthur ('Dog') Hounsell.). On 7 June 17 HAG carried out CB fire for II ANZAC Corps when it attacked following the explosion of huge mines. The results of the limited attack were spectacular, with the whole Messines–Wytschaete Ridge being captured. German retaliatory fire was intense and casualties among the RGA were high: on 13 June Maj Verschoyle-Campbell was wounded (he was later awarded the Distinguished Service Order for keeping his guns in action under heavy shelling and gas bombardment.).

In June 1917 the strength of 245th Siege Bty was increased when the personnel for an additional section joined from 339th Siege Bty. 339th Siege Bty had been formed on 15 January 1917 at Tynemouth. The personnel went out to the Western Front on 29 May and joined II Anzac Corps Heavy Artillery (HA) on 5 June. Immediately on arrival one section was posted to 245th Siege Bty, the other to 295th. However, the two additional guns for the section did not reach 245th Siege Bty until February 1918.

=== Ypres ===
On 17 July HAG moved to Fifth Army. 245th Siege Bty remained with Second Army in 42nd HAG (4 July). Both armies were preparing for the Flanders offensive (the Third Battle of Ypres). Although the preliminary bombardment had begun on 16 June, the Germans had air superiority and better observation posts (OPs), and a number of British batteries were kept hidden ('silent') including 245th Siege Bty near Knoll Farm, south-east of Zillebeke. The attack (the Battle of Pilckem Ridge) was launched on 31 July and during the afternoon 73rd HAG of Fifth Army took command of 245th Siege Bty, which opened CB fire in support of II Corps. II Corps had the hardest task, and it received the heaviest German retaliatory fire; its divisions made little progress through the shattered woods onto the plateau in front of them. Deadlocked, the corps was unable to continue towards its second and third objectives. Heavy rain in the evening halted any further moves.

In early August the batteries of 73rd HAG went silent once more. Then on 10 August they supported II Corps in a morning attack to improve its position, but this was a failure. Meanwhile, the massed guns prepared the way for the next assault (the Battle of Langemarck) on 16 August. This was also a failure and resulted in heavy casualties both to the infantry and the batteries east of Zillebeke. II Corps made another attack on 22 August at Inverness Copse, which was only partially successful.

On 23 August 245th Siege Bty came under the command of 43rd HAG, a headquarters that had not been involved in the earlier actions. By now the battery was commanded by Maj (later Brigadier Alec Wildey. On 26 and 27 August the group carried out neutralising CB fire for II and XIX Corps, which were engaged in actions at Inverness Copse and Zonnebeke. Enemy retaliation was fierce, and working parties trying to lay a new armoured telephone line to 245th Siege Bty at Knoll Farm were harassed by shellfire and suffered casualties; the line was not completed until 29 August, and was then frequently cut by shellfire. The battery temporarily took over two surviving guns of 73rd Siege Bty, which had been badly shelled and had gone for rest. 245th Siege Bty continued in its role of neutralising hostile batteries.

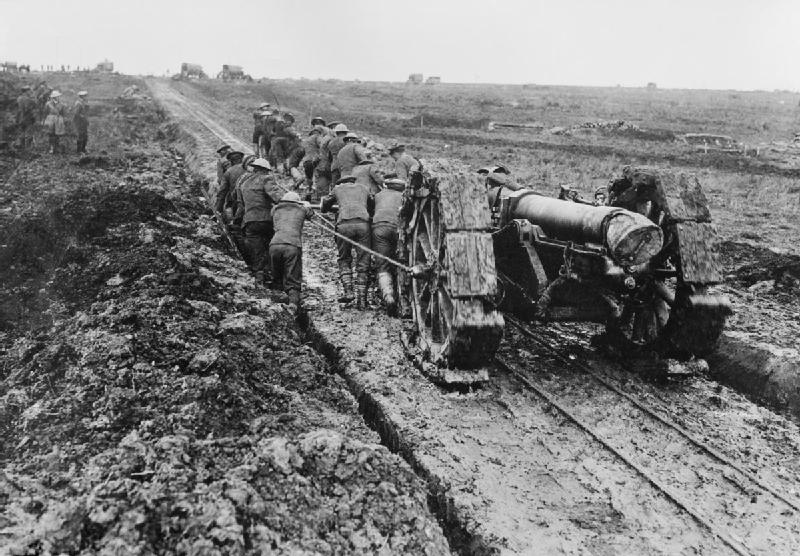
6-inch howitzer being moved through mud on the Western Front.

As the Ypres offensive bogged down, Second Army took over its direction in September and 43rd HAG was reinforced and transferred to X Corps in that army as Northern Counter-Battery Double Group. The attack on the Gheluvelt Plateau by X Corps on 20 September during the Battle of the Menin Road Ridge was successful because the objectives were limited and the heavy artillery support was overwhelming. 43rd HAG's batteries fired neutralising CB tasks all day, some on new targets spotted by aircraft, and hostile fire was weak, though 245th Siege Bty suffered a few casualties. The CB fire continued over the following days to disrupt German attempts at counter-attacks.

From the night of 24/25 September 43rd HAG's batteries concentrated on Gheluvelt to prepare for the attack planned for 26 September (the Battle of Polygon Wood), but reverted to CB fire when the Germans put in a spoiling attack between the Menin Road and Polygon Wood on 25 September. Second Army's attack still went in as scheduled at 05.50 on 26 September. 43rd HAG fired its CB neutralising tasks all day, and the German counter-attacks were crushed by the massed artillery. The group continued its CB support for X Corps' partially successful attacks on 4 October at the Battle of Broodseinde and 9 October Battle of Poelcappelle. X Corps carried out a feint attack with full artillery support when the neighbouring II ANZAC Corps attacked on 12 October at the First Battle of Passchendaele. By now the tables were turned: British batteries were clearly observable from the Passchendaele Ridge and were subjected to hostile CB fire, while their own guns sank into the mud and became difficult to move and fire. To be able to supply them with ammunition the heavy guns had to stay strung out one behind the other along the few available roads, making them an easy target. The battery was suffering almost daily casualties from shellfire and gas – Maj Wildey had been wounded on 28 September – and by 17 October it was down to an effective strength of 4 officers and 83 other ranks (ORs) against an establishment of 7 officers and 188 ORs.

The battery transferred to the command of 51st HAG on 20 October, but continued the bombardments as Second Army renewed the attack on the ridge (the Second Battle of Passchendaele) on 26 October. It transferred again to 41st HAG on 29 October, and finally went to rest on 5 November.

=== Winter 1917–18 ===
245th Siege Bty remained at rest until 21 November, then joined 6th HAG on 24 November. This group HQ was out of the line at Bomy with its batteries undergoing training, but on 30 November it received urgent orders to move to Third Army with 245th Siege Bty. 6th HAG HQ joined VII Corps HA at Villers-Faucon and the battery was in position by the night of 2 December; other batteries then joined the group. By 4 December 245th Siege Bty was in action, firing continuously in support of Third Army's troops who had been trying to ward off the fierce German counter-attack following the Battle of Cambrai. The fighting died down after a few days and routine activity resumed. 245th Siege Bty attempted some CB shoots, but the weather was too poor for observation aircraft. On 31 December the battery carried out some firing to support V Corps' attack on Welch Ridge.

By now HAG allocations were becoming more fixed, and they were converted into permanent RGA brigades during the winter. 6th HAG became 6th Brigade on 27 December, defined as a 'Mixed' brigade with a variety of different calibre guns. 245th Siege Bty remained with this brigade until 1919.

On 1 January 1918 245th Siege Bty came under heavy CB fire from 5.9-inch guns directed by a German aircraft; some casualties were caused but no guns damaged. After further shelling, the battery moved one section to a new forward position. It continued its own registration shoots when weather permitted, carried out harassing fire (HF), supported trench raids, and responded to SOS calls when the Germans retaliated. 245th Siege Bty finally received two new 6-inch howitzers to bring it up to its six-gun establishment in February 1918.

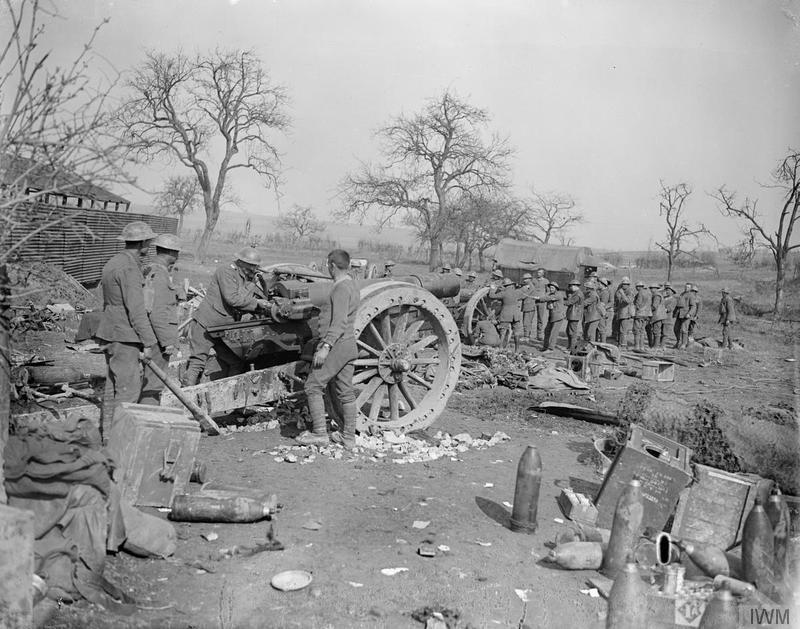
6-inch howitzers and crews in 1918.

=== Spring Offensive ===
The long-anticipated German Spring Offensive opened at 04.30 on 21 March with a violent bombardment, and 15 minutes later 6th Bde replied with its pre-planned CB programme, including gas shelling. Soon afterwards, most of the telephone lines had been cut by shellfire, but were later restored to 245th Siege Bty and the observation post (OP) exchange, though the morning mist prevented any observation. In the morning the guns fired on anticipated German forming-up areas, then fired on SOS lines. By now the positions of VII Corps' right hand division (16th (Irish) Division) had been smashed, and the Germans were pouring through: shortly after midday the gunners saw their infantry forming up in trenches near their gun positions. At 13.15 all the batteries' forward sections were pulled back to their main positions. The batteries began to pull out at 20.30, when 245th Siege Bty had to abandon three guns, one destroyed by shellfire and two others because horse teams had bolted.

Next day the batteries came into action in their new position and fired until the afternoon when they were ordered to retire, and then withdrew again early on 23 March. At this point 245th Siege Bty was north of Mont Saint-Quentin, where 16th (Irish) Division was covering Péronne and the Somme crossings. The battery was combined with 111th Siege Bty (also with three 6-inch howitzers) and 109th Heavy Bty (six 60-pounder guns) to form a mobile brigade attached to 16th (Irish) Division. After the stand on Mont St-Quentin the gunners and the remnants of 16th (Irish) Division and 39th Division withdrew through Péronne across the Bristol Bridge before it was blown up late in the afternoon. However, 245th Siege Bty had been forced to abandon and destroy two more of its howitzers for lack of transport. It handed its last gun over to 111th Siege Bty and the personnel marched back to Bray-sur-Somme with 6th HAG's HQ. On 30 March they went to Vaux-en-Amiénois, near Amiens to re-arm and refit.

=== Villers-Bretonneux ===
245th Siege Bty was back with 6th Bde by mid-April in the Villers-Bretonneux sector supporting Australian Corps and III Corps in Fourth Army. The Germans were still attacking, and launched a thrust at the town (the Second Battle of Villers-Bretonneux) on 24 April. Forewarned, the British heavy artillery began their counter-preparation simultaneously with the opening of the German bombardment at 03.45. When the direction of the German thrust became clear, all of 6th Bde's batteries that could be brought to bear were turned on the woods and roads leading to Villers-Bretonneux. In the confusion, 245th Siege Bty reported that a British RE8 aircraft had attacked it, firing three full drums of ammunition. The Australians and part of 58th (2/1st London) Division made a surprise counter-attack at 22.00 that night, without a preliminary bombardment, but once launched their attack was supported by a standing barrage on the town and on enemy assembly areas, lifting at 23.00 to provide a protective barrage 500 yards (460 m) beyond the objective. Although the full moon was obscured by clouds, the attackers were guided by the burning buildings in Villers-Bretonneux. The town was 'mopped up' next morning.

6th Brigade supported small actions by 3rd and 4th Australian Divisions in early May, otherwise the batteries spent the next few weeks in CB tasks, sometimes with sound-ranging, or firing when enemy movements were observed. On 23 May the Germans put down a heavy barrage east of the River Ancre catching the forward section of 245th Siege Bty, which had several horses hit and was unable to withdraw its guns. Although several gunners were incapacitated by gas, the section later got the guns back to Heilly and then (when they were safe from air observation) back into their normal positions. 6th Brigade was relieved on 15 June and 245th Siege Bty moved back to Bailleul, behind the lines. After a rest period, the batteries moved on 25 June to join XIX Corps with Second Army and were billeted at Zegerscappel; 245th Siege Bty had completed registering its guns by 30 June.

=== Hundred Days Offensive ===
Second Army's front was relatively quiet during the early summer. 6th Brigade's batteries carried out routine CB tasks, or supported minor operations such as one carried out by 6th Division on 14 July. The Germans had good OPs on Mont Kemmel and their aircraft were active, and on 31 July 245th Siege Bty was caught up in a German area shoot: the officer commanding, Maj Claude Penrose, and another officer were wounded. Major Penrose died the following day and is buried at Esquelbecq Military Cemetery.

The Allied Hundred Days Offensive opened on 8 August, but on Second Army' s front there was merely a small operation by 41st Division to strengthen its position, which 6th Bde supported. Second Army began its operations on 18 August: 245th Siege Bty came under attack, some 4–500 shells landing in and around it, with a few men wounded and one gun out of action. Three days later the brigade fired in support of X Corps' attack on the Dranouter Ridge. On 28 August 6th Bde was formally transferred to X Corps. Allied successes further south caused the Germans to begin giving ground in front of Second Army, retiring from Mont Kemmel on 31 August. X Corps followed up, capturing Neuve-Église on 1 September and Wulverghem next day. 6th Brigade's batteries moved forwards a section at a time, so as not to block the roads, and then put down harassing fire on Messines Ridge.

The Allies launched a fresh attack all along the front starting on 26 September. Second Army joined in on 28 September (the Fifth Battle of Ypres), with X Corps poised to seize any advantage that was presented while its artillery supported the attacks with CB and HF shoots all along Messines Ridge. German artillery responses wilted under the heavy CB fire. Patrols from X Corps pushed up onto the lightly held ridge and next day 245th Siege Bty moved up to Wulverghem and had section in action by 06.00 as X Corps pushed on towards the Ypres–Comines Canal. As the batteries moved up, 245th Siege Bty had one of its worst days of the war, four men being killed outright during the night of 9/10 October (they are all buried at Somer Farm Cemetery). On 13 October 6th Bde fired on Bousbecque in the preparation for next day's Battle of Courtrai, during which it fired a barrage before reverting to CB fire on every known enemy battery in range. Soon new battery positions had to be reconnoitred as the advance gathered pace. 6th Brigade was now operating directly with 34th Division as it pushed towards Menin and the River Lys. On 25 October 245th Siege Bty shelled bridges on the River Schelded that the enemy was retreating over, and later harassed their roads. On 31 October 6th Bde was part of the massed artillery supporting XIX Corps' successful establishment of bridgeheads on the Schelde (the 'Action of Tiegham'), the 6-inch howitzers being moved close up to the enemy. By the night of 8/9 November the enemy had withdrawn from the line of the Schelde, and as the infantry pursued 6th Bde's 6-inch batteries were unable to keep up. Hostilities ended on 11 November when the Armistice with Germany came into force.

== Disbandment ==
After the Armistice 6th Bde was billeted at newly liberated Renaix. At the end of November it marched into Germany with the occupation forces and at the end of the year was billeted at Schlebusch as part of the British Army of the Rhine. Demobilisation began in January 1919 and batteries soon became depleted in numbers. 245th Siege Bty was reduced to a cadre in March and was formally disbanded later in the year. The Commonwealth War Graves Commission lists 26 members of the battery who died in service; there may be others where the unit was not specified.
