= Brakpan (House of Assembly of South Africa constituency) =

Past constituency of Transvaal Province, South Africa

- Former constituency for the South African House of Assembly
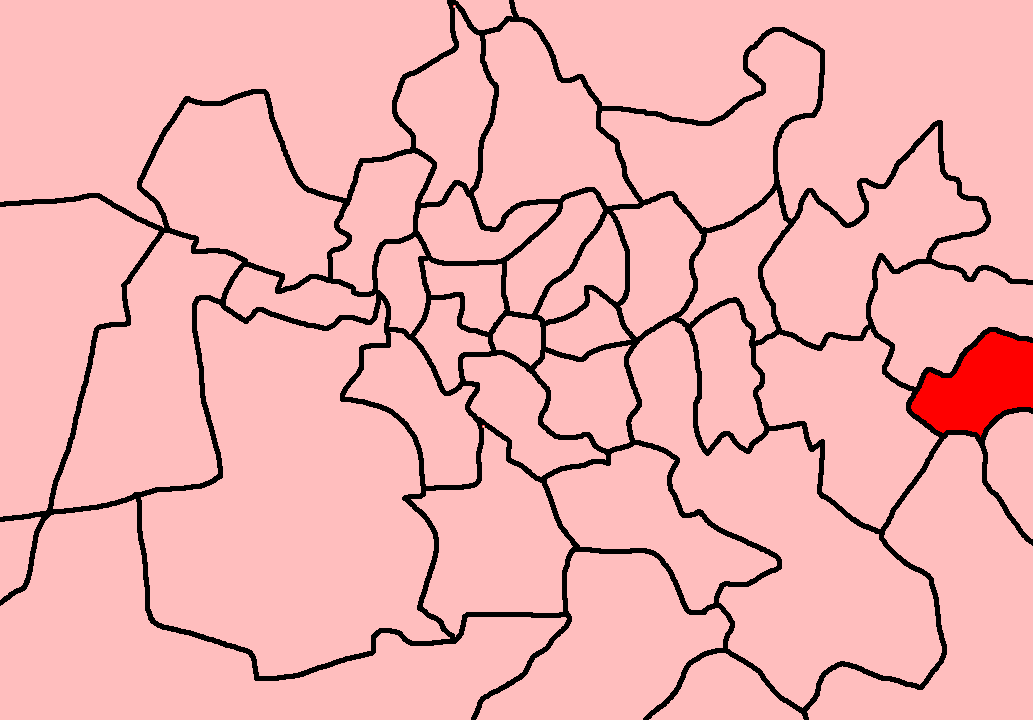
- Location of Brakpan within the Witwatersrand (1981)
- Province: Transvaal
- Electorate: 21,727 (1989)

Former constituency
- Created: 1920
- Abolished: 1994
- Number of members: 1
- Last MHA: F. J. le Roux (CP)
- Replaced by: Gauteng

Brakpan was a constituency in the Transvaal Province of South Africa, which existed from 1915 to 1994. It covered a part of the East Rand centred on the town of Brakpan. Throughout its existence it elected one member to the House of Assembly and one to the Transvaal Provincial Council.

== Franchise notes ==
When the Union of South Africa was formed in 1910, the electoral qualifications in use in each pre-existing colony were kept in place. In the Transvaal Colony, and its predecessor the South African Republic, the vote was restricted to white men, and as such, elections in the Transvaal Province were held on a whites-only franchise from the beginning. The franchise was also restricted by property and education qualifications until the 1933 general election, following the passage of the Women's Enfranchisement Act, 1930 and the Franchise Laws Amendment Act, 1931. From then on, the franchise was given to all white citizens aged 21 or over. Non-whites remained disenfranchised until the end of apartheid and the introduction of universal suffrage in 1994.

== History ==
The mines of the Witwatersrand were an early stronghold of South African trade unionism, and this made Brakpan fertile ground for the Labour Party - though not quite as safe as neighbouring seats like Benoni or Jeppes. It was held by the party from 1921 to 1929, and then became a swing seat between the National and United parties. Its United Party MP from 1938 to 1953, Alfred Ernest Trollip, later defected to the National Party and became one of its first English-speaking cabinet ministers.

In 1953, the NP took the seat, and it was safe for them for the next thirty years. In 1982, however, a hardline pro-apartheid faction around Transvaal NP leader and former cabinet minister Andries Treurnicht broke off to form the Conservative Party, and Brakpan MP François Jacobus le Roux defected to the new party. He held it in 1987 and 1989, against strong challenges from his former party, and represented the seat until the end of apartheid.

== Members ==
Election	Member	Party
1920	J. H. Munnik	National
1921	R. B. Waterston	Labour
1924	R. B. Waterston	Labour
1929	A. S. van Hees	National
1933	P. J. G. Zeeman	National
1938	A. E. Trollip	United
1943	A. E. Trollip	United
1948	A. E. Trollip	United
1953	P. W. du Plessis	National
1958	P. W. du Plessis	National
1961	G. P. C. Bezuidenhout	National
1966	G. P. C. Bezuidenhout	National
1970	G. P. C. Bezuidenhout	National
1972 by	F. J. le Roux	National
1974	F. J. le Roux	National
1977	F. J. le Roux	National
1981	F. J. le Roux	National
1982	F. J. le Roux	Conservative
1987	F. J. le Roux	Conservative
1989	F. J. le Roux	Conservative
1994	Constituency abolished	

== Detailed results ==
=== Elections in the 1920s ===
General election 1920: Brakpan
Party	Candidate	Votes	%	±%
National	J. H. Munnik	1,158	50.2	New
Labour	W. Hills	808	35.0	New
South African	D. S. Leech	343	14.9	New
Majority		350	15.2	N/A
Turnout		2,309	71.2	N/A
National win (new seat)				

General election 1921: Brakpan
Party	Candidate	Votes	%	±%
Labour	R. B. Waterston	1,326	50.2	+15.2
National	J. H. Munnik	1,314	49.8	−0.4
Majority		12	0.4	N/A
Turnout		2,640	69.7	−1.5
Labour gain from National		Swing	+7.8	

General election 1924: Brakpan
Party	Candidate	Votes	%	±%
Labour	R. B. Waterston	1,447	70.7	+20.5
South African	G. J. Joubert	591	28.9	New
Rejected ballots		10	0.4	N/A
Majority		856	41.8	N/A
Turnout		2,048	78.6	+8.9
Labour hold		Swing	N/A	

General election 1929: Brakpan
Party	Candidate	Votes	%	±%
National	A. S. van Hees	1,618	62.5	New
South African	R. C. Hitchcock	921	35.6	+6.7
Labour (N.C.)	J. Allen	38	1.5	New
Rejected ballots		13	0.4	+-0
Majority		697	26.9	N/A
Turnout		2,590	81.6	+3.0
National gain from Labour		Swing	N/A	

=== Elections in the 1930s ===
General election 1933: Brakpan
Party	Candidate	Votes	%	±%
National	P. J. G. Zeeman	1,117	24.5	−38.0
Labour (N.C.)	J. F. J. van Rensburg	1,009	22.1	+20.6
Independent	W. Hills	920	20.2	New
Industrial and Commercial Workers' Union	F. W. Pate	594	13.0	New
Independent	W. B. Gale	567	12.4	New
Independent	R. V. Acton	335	7.4	New
Rejected ballots		19	0.4	+-0
Majority		108	2.4	N/A
Turnout		4,561	73.3	−8.3
National hold		Swing	N/A	

General election 1938: Brakpan
Party	Candidate	Votes	%	±%
United	Alfred Ernest Trollip	3,377	48.0	+23.5
Purified National	S. D. de Kock	2,276	32.4	New
Labour	F. W. Lippiatt	1,346	19.1	−3.0
Rejected ballots		34	0.5	+0.1
Majority		1,101	15.7	N/A
Turnout		7,033	74.7	+1.4
United hold		Swing	N/A	
