= Trollip =

Trollip is a surname. Notable people with the surname include:

- Alfred Ernest Trollip (1895–1972), South African politician
- Athol Trollip (born 1964), South African politician
