= Department of Indian Affairs (South Africa) =

South African apartheid department for Indian affairs

The Department of Indian Affairs was a government department of South Africa established during the apartheid era to administer policies and programs specifically related to the Indian South African population. It was created in August 1961 after Indians were officially recognised as a permanent part of South Africa's population, marking a shift away from earlier policies that had focused on sending Indians back to India. The department handled matters such as education, welfare, and local governance for Indian communities, operating within the framework of racial segregation. It also oversaw the advisory National Indian Council, formed in 1964 with nominated members to represent Indian interests.

== History ==
Indian South Africans trace their origins to indentured labourers who arrived from India starting in 1860 to work on sugar plantations in Natal, with additional "passenger Indians" following as traders and professionals. For much of the early 20th century, government policies aimed at restricting Indian rights and encouraging repatriation, including discriminatory laws on land ownership, trade, and immigration. By 1961, amid growing acceptance of the permanence of the Indian population, the department was established under the government of Hendrik Verwoerd to administer "Indian own affairs" separately from other racial groups. This included oversight of education, leading to improvements such as the founding of the University of Durban-Westville in 1972.

The department's role expanded with the introduction of the tricameral parliament in 1984, which created the House of Delegates for Indian representation. However, many Indians boycotted the system, viewing it as an extension of apartheid. The department was dissolved in the early 1990s as apartheid ended and South Africa transitioned to democracy in 1994.

== List of ministers ==
Parties

National Party (5)
National People's Party (1)

No.	Portrait	Name	Took office	Left office	Prime Minister(s) / President(s)
1		Willie Maree	1961	1966	Hendrik Verwoerd (1961–1966)
2		Alfred Ernest Trollip	1966	1968	John Vorster (1966–1978)
3		Frank Waring	1968	1972	John Vorster (1966–1978)
4		Owen Horwood	1972	29 April 1974	John Vorster (1966–1978)
5		Chris Heunis	30 April 1974	1975	John Vorster (1966–1978)
Portfolio reorganised ahead of the Tricameral Parliament. (1975–1984)
5		Amichand Rajbansi	1984	1989	P. W. Botha (1984–1989)
