= Barend du Plessis =

South African politician (born 1940)

Minister of Finance
- In office 1984–1992
- Preceded by: Owen Horwood
- Succeeded by: Derek Keys

Minister of Education and Training
- In office 1983–1984

Personal details
- Born: 19 January 1940 (age 86) Johannesburg, Transvaal, Union of South Africa
- Citizenship: South African citizenship
- Party: National Party
- Education: Potchefstroom University for Christian Higher Education
- Profession: Teacher

Barend Jacobus du Plessis (born 19 January 1940 in Johannesburg) is a South African retired politician and a former member of the now-dissolved National Party, as well as Minister of Finance in 1984–1992.

== Early life and education ==
Du Plessis grew up in Boksburg where he began his education at Pioneer Primary School and matriculated at Voortrekker High School in 1956. He obtained his BSc degree in 1960 from the Potchefstroom University for Christian Higher Education (now North – West University) and in 1961 he completed his Transvaal Higher Education degree. During his studies, he played an active role in the Transvaal Education Training College Union. Although the organisation dealt mainly with students and training issues, it could be seen as his first steps into the political arena. He was elected president of the student council, which enabled him to travel overseas to The Netherlands, West Germany, and Belgium, where he met other student leaders. He also campaigned for the Nationalists in the 1960 republic referendum.

== Career ==
=== Early career ===
In 1962, he started as a mathematics teacher at the Helpmekaar Boys School in Johannesburg, and the Johannesburg Technical College. Later, he was appointed an administrative officer at the South African Broadcasting Corporation (SABC). Du Plessis was next promoted to the data processing unit, where he trained in computer technology. He was promoted and transferred to the office of the Director General as an administrative secretary. After his resignation from the SABC in 1968, he went to work at IBM until 1974. Here he received training in banking and finance, while also attending the IBM Graduate School of Banking Business at Princeton University in the United States.

=== Political career ===
Du Plessis's father was an active member of the National Party and a political career was always a part of his aspirations. He had already worked for the National Party during elections and the Republic referendum of 1960. In 1966, he became an official member of the National Party. After entering his first step in community service in 1972 as an elected official to the Johannesburg City Council, he rapidly advanced himself and was chosen as vice mayor in 1974. He also ran as the NP candidate in the Florida constituency in the same year and won the seat from the United Party.

In his capacity as a cabinet minister, he served as a member of the Elected Committee on Public Accounts from 1976-81. He was also elected as secretary of the National Party Study Group on Finance from 1979-81. He was also the Information Officer for the National Party from 1977-81. In 1982, he was elected chairman of the committee that studied South African Broadcasting, but remained interested in finance and economics and was eventually elected Minister of Foreign Affairs and Information. Until this appointment, he served as director for twelve companies.

As a minister, he was concerned with the Government's relationship with the press. In his first few weeks, he made some controversial statements regarding the SABC 's broadcasting Conservative Party propaganda and reporting on government affairs. He was also present, along with Pik Botha, Minister of Foreign Affairs, at the negotiations with Angolan leaders.

On 23 November 1983, he was appointed the Minister of Education and Training in P. W. Botha's Cabinet, being succeeded the following year by Frederik Willem de Klerk. Here he encountered school boycotts in Atteridgeville, Pretoria, where he personally negotiated with the student leaders to deal to their problems. In an effort to ease tensions after the death of a student during police action, he consulted with Bishop Desmond Tutu, but by May 1984, six Atteridgeville and Saulsville schools closed. He sought to understand the role of the black community and to reorganise schools and pointed out that any parent or student had a direct communication with him as minister.

In 1984, during the budget speech of his department in Parliament senior black teachers attended the debate. He declared that there would be no racial restrictions in the future in the Department of Education.

Barend du Plessis was appointed the Minister of Finance in August 1984. He succeeded Dr. Owen Horwood, inheriting an extremely complex task. South Africa was in financial trouble as a result of various factors including the decline in value of gold. The rand/dollar exchange rate was at an all-time low and the land was shrouded in a general drought; with exports dropping significantly. In 1985, he was charged with the task of restructuring South African international credit so foreign banks could extend short-term credit to South Africa. He served as Finance Minister in the latter part of P. W. Botha's cabinet and in the first part of F. W. de Klerk's administration. He later became the chairman of the National Party 's Federal Information Committee and member of the Executive National Party in the Transvaal.

After P. W. Botha fell ill in 1989, he successfully contested interim president Chris Heunis and Foreign Minister Pik Botha in the struggle for the leadership of the National Party but was beaten in the final round by De Klerk, son of former interim president Jan de Klerk, by a 69–61 figure. Du Plessis was recalled to De Klerk's cabinet but left his post in 1992.

== Personal life ==
He is married to Antoinette van den Berg and has four children.

Political offices
| Preceded by Owen Horwood | Minister of Finance; 1984–1992 | Succeeded by Derek Keys |
