= 1993 raid on Mthatha =

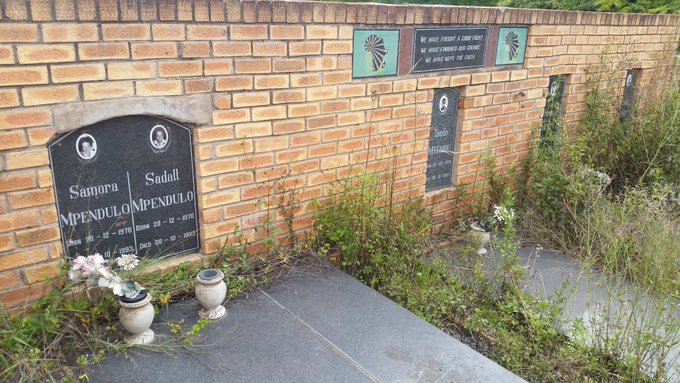
The graves of the children who died in the 1993 Mthatha raid

On 8 October 1993, Mzwandile Mfeya (12 years), Sandiso Yose (12 years), twins Samora and Sadat Mpendulo (16 years) and Thando Mtembu (17 years) were shot dead in a South African Defence Force (SADF) raid on an alleged base of the Azanian People's Liberation Army (APLA), the Pan Africanist Congress' military wing, at the Mpendulo family home in the Northcrest suburb of Mthatha. The house belonged to a PAC member Sigqibo Mpendulo, the father of Samora and Sadat. According to PAC and police sources in the Transkei, the five victims were killed in their beds. The raid was authorised by President F. W. de Klerk.

== Background ==
In the early 1990s, APLA conducted a series of attacks on civilian targets from operational bases in the Transkei. Operations in the Western Cape had particularly strong links to APLA structures in the Transkei. Weaponry was also sourced from some members of Transkei security forces. For example, the Amnesty Committee heard that the hand grenades used in the St James' and Heidelberg attacks originated from a batch of grenades supplied to the Transkei Defence Force. Transkei also provided refuge for APLA operatives after operations. In most cases it was APLA personnel from the Transkei that were deployed to execute attacks, in conjunction with locally trained operatives. Local PAC structures provided logistical support to the operatives.

In March 1993, APLA robbed the University of Transkei in Mthatha. A policeman was killed, two others were wounded and R500,000 was stolen. A member of the SAP was shot and seriously wounded by APLA members at a roadblock in Botshabelo, near Bloemfontein, during July 1993. On 26 July 1993 members of APLA opened fire on a congregation in St James Church in Kenilworth, in Cape Town, killing 11 people and injuring 50 others. All these attacks were linked to bases in the Transkei. General George Meiring, chief of the army at the time of the attack, said in a section 29 investigative enquiry that more than 50 APLA attacks had been launched across the Transkei border in the period preceding October 1993 and that the role of the Transkei in providing both a safe haven for the APLA high command and APLA operatives, and in providing military training, had been confirmed by a Goldstone Commission enquiry.

According to 1997 TRC Final Report on the 1993 Mthatha Raid, "The State Security Council (SSC) had discussed the increase in bases and APLA attacks originating from Transkei in August 1993. During September, the SADF received information from the SAP regarding the use of the Mpendulo residence as an APLA arms facility and base from which attacks in the Eastern and Western Cape were launched. According to this intelligence, some 18 APLA operatives stayed at the house. General Meiring indicated that he relied on then director of operations Brigadier Castleman, and a senior staff officer for intelligence, Colonel Gibson for the planning of the raid at the Mpendulo residence. With the approval of Minister Kobie Coetsee, an army reconnaissance mission was launched on 2 October 1993. This confirmed the SAP's intelligence but, on Meiring's admission, was unable to confirm whether weapons were indeed stored there. Further, the reconnaissance mission withdrew at approximately 20h00 on 7 October, hours after authority had been given "to conduct a limited strike on the house" in order "to neutralise the target"."

This authorisation emanated from a meeting of the SSC attended by, inter alia, Ministers Kriel, Coetsee, Pik Botha and then State President F. W. de Klerk. In describing his role in authorising the raid, F. W. de Klerk said in his autobiography The Last Trek-- a New Beginning: The Autobiography that he had been informed by his advisors (advised by two police informants) that the Mpendulo residence was a base for APLA terrorists. De Klerk did not engage the then head of state in Transkei, Bantu Holomisa, because he felt Holomisa, confronted with the new information, would find a way to move the APLA caders to a safe place. "I accordingly authorised the defence force to raid the house, but stipulated that minimum force should be used and that care should be taken to avoid serious injuries and casualties."

== The Raid ==
The strike was conducted by the 45 Parachute Brigade, under the command of Colonel Hannes Venter. According to Meiring, the attack took place at 02:00. When the attacking force reached the house, the house was dark. The door was kicked open and because of security reasons, they did not switch on the lights but used flash lights. They were prepared to find as many as 12 people. There were actually only five persons in the house and all were killed because they "brandished" weapons. The police docket indicates that 78 cartridges and 26 projectiles were found in the house. Four of the five victims were shot in the head.

== Aftermath ==
On 22 September 1995, the newly-structured South African National Defence Force (SANDF) admitted that it destroyed weapons used in the Mthatha Raid. The post-apartheid South African cabinet led by the then Justice Minister Dullah Omar compensated the families of the deceased and the payment of R238 000 to all the claimants. In 1997, the Truth and Reconciliation Committee declared the Mthatha Raid a gross violation of human rights. The commission further found the failure of the SANDF to produce the weapons allegedly seized at the Mpendulo residence for forensic examination as proof that they did not exist.

== See also ==
- APLA
- Langa Massacre
- Pan Africanist Congress
- Marikana massacre
- Sharpeville massacre
- Bisho massacre
