= Schlebusch =

Schlebusch is a district in the south-east of the municipality of Leverkusen in the German state of North Rhine-Westphalia. It has an area of 10.31 km^{2} and in May 2013 had a population of 26,149. Its principal street is the Mülheimer Straße, which until 2014 formed part of Bundesstraße 51.

The settlement gives its name to a family. Reputedly derived from a German word for a thorn bush, the family name was originally von Schlebusch which may indicate a title. The first recorded bearer of this surname, in 1174, was Arnoldus de Rode von Schlebuschrode. The Schlebusch family was from the Ritterklasse (originating from a knighthood) meaning they were noble, but not necessarily titled.

The Schlebusch family living in South Africa today descends from a single ancestor, Johannes Antonius Schlebusch, who had two sons and a daughter. He and his wife, Geertruyda Anna Timmer, arrived in South Africa from Amsterdam in 1805 (his grandfather moved from the Cologne region to Amsterdam). Today several thousand Schlebusch descendants live in South Africa. A small group of this family (Jan Louis Schlebusch and two of his sisters) emigrated to Argentina in the early 1900s. Alwyn Schlebusch was Vice President of South Africa from 1981 to 1984.
