= Lourens Muller =

South African politician

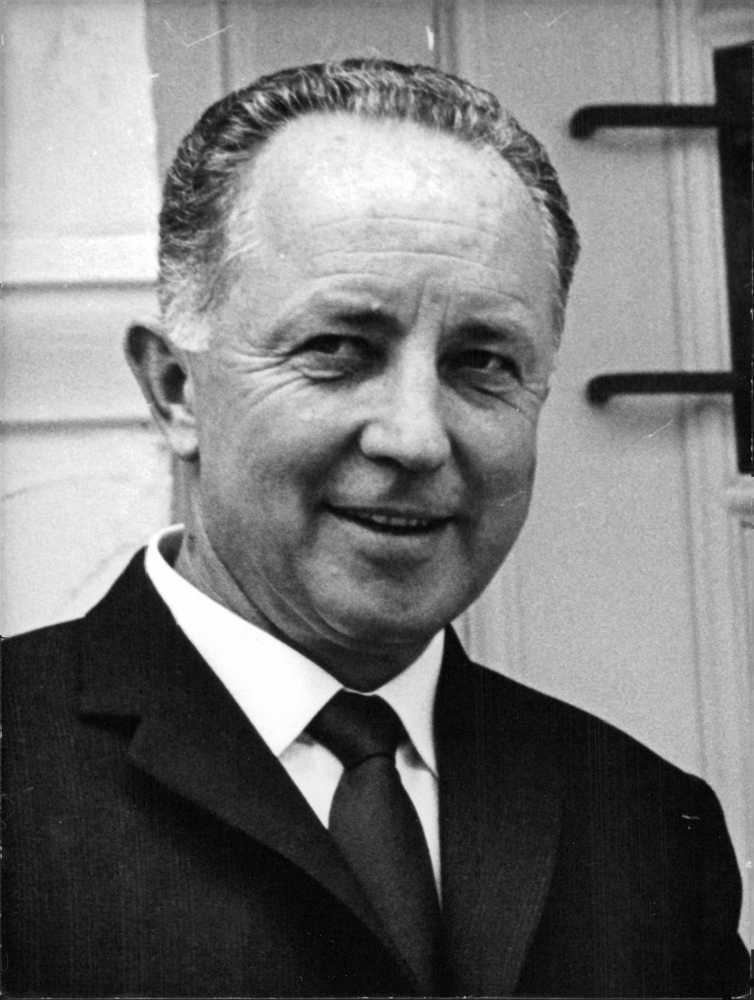

Minister of Transport
- In office 29 April 1974 – February 1979
- Prime Minister: John Vorster; P. W. Botha
- Preceded by: Ben Schoeman
- Succeeded by: Chris Heunis

Minister of Economic Affairs
- In office 22 April 1970 – 29 April 1974
- Prime Minister: John Vorster
- Preceded by: Jan Haak
- Succeeded by: Owen Horwood

Minister of Home Affairs
- In office 9 August 1968 – 22 April 1970
- Prime Minister: John Vorster
- Preceded by: P. K. Le Roux
- Succeeded by: Marais Viljoen

Minister of Police
- In office 9 August 1968 – 29 April 1974
- Prime Minister: John Vorster
- Preceded by: John Vorster
- Succeeded by: Jimmy Kruger as Minister of Justice, Police and Prisons

Personal details
- Born: Stefanus Lourens Muller; 27 September 1917 Beaufort West, Cape Province, South Africa
- Died: 30 April 2005 (aged 87) Somerset West, Western Cape South Africa
- Resting place: Robertson
- Party: National Party (1961–1980)
- Other political affiliations: Conservative Party (from 1982)
- Spouse: Hanlie van Niekerk (divorced)
- Occupation: Politician, lawyer, railwayman

Stefanus Lourens Muller (1917–2005) was a South African politician and cabinet minister.

== Biography ==
Lourens Muller was born in Beaufort West in the Cape Province in 1917. Muller worked for South African Railways before studying law and practicing as a lawyer in Robertson. He was married to the soprano singer Hanlie van Niekerk, but divorced soon afterwards. In 1961, he was elected to parliament as the National Party candidate in the constituency of Ceres. Muller initially worked under the Justice ministry, then held several ministerial posts under prime minister John Vorster with whom he had developed a close political alliance. Under the Vorster and Botha governments, Muller held the ministries of Police, Economic Affairs, Home Affairs and Transport.

After Vorster's resignation as State President in the aftermath of the information scandal, Muller was widely considered the favourite to succeed him. The position instead went to Marais Viljoen.

Muller was dismissed from the government by prime minister P. W. Botha, after a growing series of disagreements. After his dismissal, Muller left the National Party in 1980 and later became a founding member of Andries Treurnicht's Conservative Party. In 1981, Muller would retire from parliament at that year's general election. He died after a period of illness in 2005. He had been treated at a clinic in Somerset West before his death.

Political offices
Preceded by Ben Schoeman	Minister of Transport; 1974–1979	Succeeded by Chris Heunis
Preceded by Jan Haak	Minister of Economic Affairs; 1970–1974	Succeeded by Owen Horwood
Preceded by P. K. Le Roux	Minister of Home Affairs; 1968–1970	Succeeded by Marais Viljoen
Preceded by John Vorster	Minister of Police; 1968–1974	Succeeded by Jimmy Kruger
