= Rupert Lorimer =

South African politician

Rupert John Lorimer (died 3 January 2019) was a South African politician who represented the Progressive Party and Democratic Party in the House of Assembly. He was first elected to Parliament in April 1974 as a member of the Progressive Party. During the negotiations to end apartheid, he was appointed to help enforce the National Peace Accord as a peace monitor in the Transvaal. He died on 3 January 2019, aged 87.

Lorimer's children became post-apartheid politicians in the Democratic Alliance: his son is James Lorimer, who served in the National Assembly, and his daughter is Kate Lorimer, who served in the Gauteng Provincial Legislature.
