= Vice State President of South Africa =

- Coat of Arms of South Africa
- Formation: 1 January 1981
- First holder: Alwyn Schlebusch
- Final holder: Alwyn Schlebusch
- Abolished: 14 September 1984
- Succession: Deputy President of South Africa

The Vice State President of South Africa (Afrikaans: Adjunk-staatspresident van Suid-Afrika) was a position established between 1981 and 1984. Alwyn Schlebusch was the only holder of the position.

The position was created under constitutional reforms in 1981, which abolished the Senate, and created a President's Council, chaired by the Vice State President, to advise on the drafting of a new constitution. The post was abolished when the 1983 Constitution came into effect, combining the ceremonial post of State President with that of Prime Minister, to create an executive post, with only provision for an Acting State President.

The executive position of Deputy President of South Africa was established in 1994.

== Vice State President of South Africa ==
Party

National Party

No.	Portrait	Name (Birth–Death)	Term of office			State President	Political party
No.	Portrait	Name (Birth–Death)	Took office	Left office	Time in office	State President	Political party
1		Alwyn Schlebusch (1917–2008)	1 January 1981	14 September 1984	3 years, 257 days	Marais Viljoen	National Party

== See also ==
- State President of South Africa
