= Chris Heunis =

South African politician

Jan Christiaan Heunis DMS

Acting State President of South Africa
- In office 19 January 1989 – 15 March 1989
- Preceded by: Pieter Willem Botha
- Succeeded by: Pieter Willem Botha

Minister of Constitutional Development
- In office 1982–1989
- President: Pieter Willem Botha

Minister of Home Affairs
- In office 1980–1982
- Prime Minister: Pieter Willem Botha

Minister of Transport
- In office February 1979 – June 1979

Minister of the Environment
- In office November 1978 – June 1979

Personal details
- Born: 20 April 1927 Uniondale, Cape Province, Union of South Africa
- Died: 27 January 2006 (aged 78) Somerset West, Western Cape, Republic of South Africa
- Party: National Party
- Occupation: Lawyer

Jan Christiaan "Chris" Heunis (locally /ˈhjɜːnɪs/), DMS (20 April 1927 – 27 January 2006) was a South African Afrikaner lawyer, politician, member of the National Party and cabinet minister in the governments of John Vorster and P. W. Botha.

He was born in 1927 in Uniondale in the Cape Province (now the Western Cape). After studying in George, he continued his studies in law and became a lawyer in 1951. At the same time, he pursued a political career and became head of the National Party in George District and a member of the municipal council. In 1959, he was elected to the Provincial Council.

Heunis was elected to the House of Assembly in 1970, and in 1974 became Minister of Indian Affairs and Tourism in the government of John Vorster. In 1975, he became Minister of Economic Affairs. In 1979, as part of the P. W. Botha Government, he participated in the preparation of a new constitution, and in 1982, became Minister of Constitutional Reform. In this role, he put in place the Tricameral Parliament, gave the right to vote to the Coloureds and Indians, in separate chambers of the South African Parliament. He convinced the leader of the Labour Party, Allan Hendrickse, to agree to this reform.

During this time, he took part in confidential informal interviews in Port Elizabeth between two NP representatives, and two representatives from the ANC. In September 1986, Heunis was unanimously voted leader of the NP in the Cape Province, taking over from President P. W. Botha.

At the beginning of 1989, he assumed the functions of State President for the interim for 55 days when P. W. Botha suffered a stroke. He was one of the candidates for leadership of the National Party, along with Pik Botha, Barend du Plessis and Frederik de Klerk, but was beaten in the second round of elections. He narrowly avoided defeat in the 1987 election, in which he faced a challenge from former NP MP and diplomat Denis Worrall, but held the seat by 39 votes.

Later, Heunis retired from political life, and did not participate in the elections of 1989, and returned to his law practice in Somerset West with his son Jakkie Heunis. He received an honorary doctorate in philosophy from the University of Stellenbosch, honorary lieutenant-colonel of the police, honorary citizen of George, decorated with the Grand Cordon of the order of the Republic of China, and was father of four boys and one girl. He died in January 2006 in Somerset West after a long illness.

Political offices
Preceded by New post	Minister of Constitutional Development; 1982–1989	Succeeded by Gerrit Viljoen
Preceded by Alwyn Schlebusch	Minister of Home Affairs; 1980–1982	Succeeded by Frederik de Klerk
Preceded by Lourens Muller	Minister of Transport; 1979–1980	Succeeded by Hendrik S. Schoeman
Preceded by Fanie Botha	Minister of Energy; February–June 1979	Succeeded by Frederik de Klerk
Preceded by Schalk van der Merwe	Minister of the Environment; November 1978 – June 1979	Succeeded by Frederik de Klerk
Preceded by Owen Horwood	Minister of Economic Affairs; 1975–1980	Succeeded by Dawie de Villiers
Preceded by Owen Horwood	Minister of Tourism and Indian Affairs; 1974–1975	Succeeded by Marais Steyn
