= Jimmy Kruger =

South African politician (1917–1987)

President of the Senate
- In office 19 June 1979 – 31 December 1980
- President: John Vorster; Marais Viljoen
- Prime Minister: P. W. Botha
- Preceded by: Marais Viljoen
- Succeeded by: Position abolished Kobie Coetsee (1994)

Minister of Justice, Police and Prisons
- In office 29 April 1974 – 19 June 1979
- Prime Minister: John Vorster; P. W. Botha
- Preceded by: Petrus Cornelius Pelser as Minister of Justice; Lourens Muller as Minister of Police
- Succeeded by: Alwyn Schlebusch as Minister of Justice; Louis le Grange as Minister of Police

Personal details
- Born: James Thomas Kruger; 20 December 1917 Bethlehem, Orange Free State, South Africa
- Died: 9 May 1987 (aged 69) Irene, Transvaal, South Africa
- Party: National Party (1962–1980)
- Other political affiliations: Conservative Party (1982–1987)
- Spouse: Susan Kruger (m. 1943)
- Children: 2
- Education: University of the Witwatersrand
- Occupation: Politician, lawyer

James Thomas Kruger (20 December 1917 – 9 May 1987) was a South African lawyer and politician of Welsh descent who was part of the conservative National Party-led government which championed apartheid. He rose to the position of Minister of Justice and the Police in the cabinet of Prime Minister John Vorster from 1974 to 1979. He was also President of the Senate from 1979 until 1980, when it was abolished.

== Background ==
Kruger was born in Bethlehem, Orange Free State, South Africa to Welsh parents and was adopted by Afrikaner parents. He obtained his matric from a high school in Ventersdorp and then became a miner. He trained as a surveyor at a gold mine in Brakpan before taking an exam as a mining surveyor. Later he would work as surveyor engineer in Barberton.

== Education ==
Kruger studied part-time for an Afrikaans teaching degree from the University of South Africa (UNISA) and later attended the University of the Witwatersrand where he obtained a law degree in 1954. He began practising as a lawyer in 1955.

== Political career ==
In 1962 he became a member of the Transvaal Provincial Council. As National Party candidate, he became a member of the House of Assembly in the South African parliament from 1966. In 1972, Kruger was made a deputy cabinet minister in the police, health and welfare portfolio. In 1974 he was upgraded to a full minister for the police, prisons and justice portfolio. In June 1979, the ceremonial post of President of the Senate but retired in 1980 when the Senate was abolished.

=== Steve Biko ===
He was responsible for the banning of Black Consciousness Movement leader Steve Biko; when Biko died in police custody, the police claimed that Biko had died during a hunger strike. This account was challenged by the white South African journalist Donald Woods, a personal friend of Biko. Kruger's response to Biko's death was: "Dit laat my koud." ("It leaves me cold."). Kruger later began to recant his earlier statements, while claiming that Biko had authored pamphlets calling for "blood and body in the streets." Woods came under increasing scrutiny for his articles, and finally, following the publication of an article calling on Kruger to resign, he was banned under direct orders from Kruger. Not long afterwards, Woods and his family fled the country for a life of exile in England.

In response to international pressure, the South African government ordered an inquest to investigate the cause of Biko's death; the presiding magistrate concluded that Biko had died of brain damage caused by head injury; however, no one was held responsible for, or prosecuted for, Biko's death. Even so, it was the end of Kruger's career. Having decided that his performance had severely compromised the country's credibility abroad, the government ordered him to resign, and he lost not only his cabinet post, but his membership in the ruling party, as well. In 1982, Kruger joined the Conservative Party of Andries Treurnicht in protest against the racial reforms of the Botha Government. Kruger spent the rest of his life in political obscurity.

== Marriage ==
Kruger was married to Susan Kruger after whom the Robben Island ferry the Susan Kruger was named in 1977.

== Death ==
Kruger died at his home in Irene after recently having heart surgery. He was survived by his wife, Susanna and two sons, Eugene and Eitel.

== Cultural references ==
In the film Cry Freedom (1987), which was based on Woods's role in the anti-apartheid struggle, Kruger was portrayed by English actor John Thaw.

In the film Goodbye Bafana (2007), Kruger was portrayed by South African actor Norman Anstey.

== See also ==
- South Africa under apartheid
