= Piet Koornhof =

South African politician (1925–2007)

Piet Koornhof, DMS

South Africa Ambassador to the United States
- In office 1 May 1987 – 6 March 1991
- Preceded by: Johannes Beukes
- Succeeded by: Harry Schwarz

Minister of Cooperation and Development
- In office 9 October 1978 – September 1984
- Prime Minister: P. W. Botha
- Succeeded by: Gerrit Viljoen

Minister of Mining Minister of Sports and Recreation
- In office 29 April 1974 – 10 October 1978
- Prime Minister: John Vorster
- Preceded by: Carel de Wet

Minister of Immigration Minister of Energy and Mining
- In office 23 August 1972 – 29 April 1974
- Prime Minister: John Vorster

Personal details
- Born: 2 August 1925 Leeudoringstad, Transvaal, South Africa
- Died: 12 November 2007 (aged 82) Stellenbosch, Western Cape, South Africa
- Party: National→UDM→ANC

Pieter G. J. Koornhof, DMS (2 August 1925 – 12 November 2007) was a South African politician. As an apartheid-era National Party cabinet minister, he held various portfolios in the cabinets of B.J. Vorster and P.W. Botha. He was regarded as one of the most reform‐minded ministers in the government. He later served as South Africa Ambassador to the United States. After the end of apartheid, he joined the African National Congress in 2001.

== Early life and education ==
Piet Koornhof was born on 2 August 1925 in Leeudoringstad in the Western Transvaal. He studied theology at the University of Stellenbosch, and completed his studies at Oxford after being awarded a Rhodes Scholarship. His doctoral dissertation focussed on the "inevitable urbanisation" of black people in Africa.

== Political career ==
After returning to South Africa, he joined the National Party in 1956. He became a researcher for Hendrik Verwoerd, the Prime Minister of South Africa, and was appointed director of the Federasie van Afrikaanse Kultuurvereniginge, an institute for the advancement of Afrikaner culture. In 1962, he became secretary of the Afrikaner Broederbond and in 1964 was elected Member of Parliament for Primrose.

In 1968, he became Deputy Minister of Bantu Affairs and Bantu Education in the government of B.J. Vorster. In 1972, he became Minister of Energy and in 1973 combined this post with that of Minister of Sports. In this position, he announced the creation of separate sports teams for different races. He then served as Minister of Energy from 1972 to 1976.

In 1977 he shocked colleagues in his party with his suggestion that black citizens be given political rights in a new constitutional system for the country. He proposed that they be included in the Tricameral Parliament.

In one of his first moves as Prime Minister, PW Botha appointed Koornhof as minister responsible for black affairs. Between 1978 and 1984, Koornhof was involved in the implementation of apartheid laws by the forced removal of thousands of blacks from residential areas declared as white-only. Botha had led a campaign to demolish Crossroads, a high-density township in Cape Town in 1978. Amid significant opposition, Botha and Koornhof agreed to "indefinitely delay" the demolitions.

In July 1981, he reassured the white electorate that racially desegregated public spaces in white areas would not be "swamped" or "crowded out". He suggested racially segregated bridges and keeping facilities open to all races on weekdays and racially segregated on weekends, for the exclusive use of whites. Beeld accused Koornhof of resurrecting "prehistoric debates" of the early apartheid era and questioned how the white minority can gain the support of nonwhites "if in 1981 we speak of separate bridges a la 1948."

He nevertheless launched significant studies into potential constitutional models for South Africa. During this time he was specifically vocal in advocating the Swiss canton model, in which a heterogeneous population could be governed under a system free of the oppression of any one dominant group that typically plagues a "Winner Takes All" system. After informing P.W. Botha, the State President before F. W. de Klerk, that peace in South Africa would arrive only through releasing Nelson Mandela, he was relegated to an insignificant post as Ambassador to the United States.

From 1986 to 1991, he served as South Africa's last ambassador to the US who was also a National Party member. While ambassador in the United States he made an important speech at a conference in Palm Springs, Florida in which he foresaw the inevitable demise of Apartheid. His successor as ambassador in Washington was Harry Schwarz, a prominent leader of the Progressive Federal Party, and later the Democratic Party.

Throughout his career, Koornhof was seen as a moderate, at least compared to others in the apartheid government, and as a warm, larger than life personality with many contradictions.

== Life after politics ==
In 1993, he made the headlines when, at the age of 68, he left his wife for a young coloured woman with whom he subsequently had five children.

In the new dispensation that followed non-racial elections in South Africa in 1994, he agreed to testify before the Truth and Reconciliation Commission set up by the new South African government and chaired by the Archbishop of Cape Town, Desmond Tutu. He was one of the few former apartheid ministers to acknowledge the atrocities committed under their control during apartheid.

In 1998, Piet Koornhof and his son, Gerhard Koornhof, until then members of the National Party, announced that they were joining a new multiracial party, the United Democratic Movement of Bantu Holomisa. In 2001 he joined the African National Congress.

On several occasions Koornhof's marital problems came to the fore, especially during his 12-year separation from his wife, during which he lived together with his girlfriend. He later returned to his wife.

He died in 2007 at the age of 82 and was cremated in Stellenbosch. He received eulogies from across the political spectrum in South Africa, from his former companions in the National Party, members of the ANC, the United Democratic Movement and the Inkatha Freedom Party.
