= Alfred Ernest Trollip =

South African politician

The Honourable Alfred Ernest Trollip
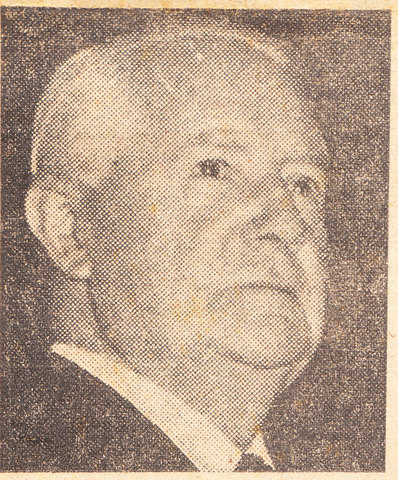
- Trollip in 1971

Minister of Labour & Immigration
- In office 8 October 1961 – 30 March 1966
- President: Charles Robberts Swart
- Prime Minister: Hendrik Verwoerd
- Preceded by: Jan de Klerk
- Succeeded by: Marais Viljoen

Minister of Indian Affairs
- In office 1966–1968
- President: C.R. Swart • Tom Naudé • Jim Fouché
- Prime Minister: John Vorster

Personal details
- Born: 16 July 1895 Johannesburg, South African Republic
- Died: 12 March 1972 (aged 76) Pretoria, Transvaal, South Africa
- Party: National Party
- Other political affiliations: United Party
- Spouse: Isobel Allen Mitchell
- Children: 2
- Relatives: Athol Trollip
- Education: University of the Witwatersrand
- Occupation: Politician • Lawyer

Alfred Ernest Trollip (16 July 1895 – 12 March 1972) was a South African lawyer and politician. Trollip was elected to the House of Assembly as the United Party member for the electoral district of Brakpan in 1938, up until 1953. He then represented the electoral district of Bezuidenhout in Johannesburg from 1953 to 1958, then an Administrator of Natal from 1958 to 1961. Thereafter, he joined the National Party in 1961, as a member of the Senate and served as a cabinet minister, specifically as Minister of Labour & Immigration from 1961 to 1966 and then as Minister of Indian Affairs from 1966 to 1968.

== Early life and education ==
Trollip was born on 16 July 1895 in Johannesburg, Transvaal Colony. He attended Jeppe High School, later enrolling at the University of the Witwatersrand to study law. At age 22, shortly after qualifying, he began practicing as an attorney in Brakpan.

== Political career ==
=== United Party MP (1938–1958) ===
Trollip was elected to the Union Parliament as the United Party MP for Brakpan in 1938 and later represented Bezuidenhout from 1953 to 1958. He served on the Transvaal Provincial Council prior to entering Parliament.

=== Administrator of Natal (1958–1961) ===
Trollip served as Administrator (provincial head) of Natal Province from 1958 until November 1961. His term coincided with the period of the 1960 republican referendum.

=== NP & Cabinet Minister (1961–1968) ===
In 1961, Trollip left the United Party and joined the National Party. He became a senator for the NP and entered Hendrik Verwoerd's cabinet as Minister with responsibility for Labour/Immigration and Employment from 1961 to 1966. Under John Vorster's government he served as Minister for Immigration and Indian Affairs from 1966 to 1968. Contemporary government records list Trollip's ministerial functions and statutory instruments he signed while in office.

== Later life and death ==
Trollip retired from ministerial office in 1968 due to health reasons. He died on 12 March 1972 in Pretoria.
