= Alwyn Schlebusch =

South African politician

- Schlebusch c. 1984

Vice State President of South Africa
- In office 1 January 1981 – 14 September 1984
- President: Marais Viljoen
- Prime Minister: Pieter Willem Botha

Speaker of Parliament of South Africa
- In office 1974–1976
- Preceded by: Klopper, H.
- Succeeded by: Loots, J.

Personal details
- Born: Alwyn Louis Schlebusch; 16 September 1917 Lady Grey, Cape Province, South Africa
- Died: 7 January 2008 (aged 90) Pretoria, Gauteng, South Africa
- Party: National
- Spouse(s): Isabella Elizabeth Krause and Jeanette Rouen
- Children: 4
- Education: University of Pretoria
- Occupation: Politician

Alwyn Schlebusch's coat of arms (1971)

Alwyn Louis Schlebusch (16 September 1917 – 7 January 2008) was a South African politician, the only holder of the title Vice State President of South Africa from 1 January 1981 to 14 September 1984. He was an Afrikaner with a surname of German origin. He was born in Lady Grey, Eastern Cape. He was the son of Charel Johannes Schlebusch and Elizabeth Cornelia Myburgh and eldest brother of Charel Johannes Schlebusch, Elsie Cornelia Schlebusch and Anna Christina Schlebusch.

== Career ==
Schlebusch was appointed chair of the eponymous Schlebusch Commission in 1972, which had the power to cut foreign funding and seize the assets of anti-apartheid organizations, such as the Christian Institute of Southern Africa.

The position of Vice State President was created when the Senate was abolished in 1981. During his tenure, Schlebusch chaired the President's Council, which advised on the creation of a new constitution. The post was abolished when the new constitution came into effect, replacing the ceremonial post of State President with an executive State President, with only provision for an Acting State President.

Before holding the post, Schlebusch was mayor of Hennenman in the 1940s, before being elected to the House of Assembly as MP for Kroonstad from 1962 to 1980, Minister of Public Works and Immigration in 1976, and Minister of Justice and Internal Affairs in 1979. Schlebusch succeeded Jimmy Kruger in the portfolio and was viewed as a considerably more moderate figure, notably he was instrumental in compelling the Pretoria Bar Association to admit black lawyers.

Subsequently, he held the position of Minister in the Office of the President in 1986. He died on 7 January 2008. He was survived by a son and two daughters, 14 grandchildren and 5 great grandchildren. His wife, Isabel, died in 1996 of cancer. She founded the "Toktokkie" cancer campaign in South Africa.

Academic offices
Preceded by Hilgard Muller	Chancellor of the University of Pretoria; 1984–1986	Succeeded by Anton Rupert
