= F. W. de Klerk =

President of South Africa from 1989 to 1994

Staatspresident F. W. de Klerk OMG DMS
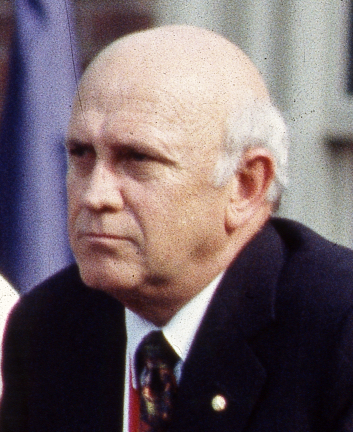
- De Klerk in 1993

State President of South Africa
- In office 15 August 1989 (Note: Acting: 15 August – 20 September 1989) – 10 May 1994
- Preceded by: P. W. Botha
- Succeeded by: Nelson Mandela (as President)

Deputy President of South Africa
- In office 10 May 1994 – 30 June 1996 Serving with Thabo Mbeki
- President: Nelson Mandela
- Preceded by: position established
- Succeeded by: Thabo Mbeki (solely)

Leader of the Opposition
- In office 1 July 1996 – 8 September 1997
- President: Nelson Mandela
- Preceded by: Constand Viljoen
- Succeeded by: Marthinus van Schalkwyk

President of the National Party
- In office 2 February 1989 – 8 September 1997
- Preceded by: Pieter Willem Botha
- Succeeded by: Marthinus van Schalkwyk (New National Party)
Ministerial offices 1978‍–‍1989
Minister of National Education and Planning
In office 17 September 1984 – 15 August 1989
President	Pieter Willem Botha
Preceded by	Gerrit Viljoen (National Education)
Succeeded by	Gene Louw (Education and Culture)
Minister of Home Affairs
In office 1982–1985
President	Pieter Willem Botha (1984–1985)
Prime Minister	Pieter Willem Botha (1982–1984)
Preceded by	Chris Heunis
Succeeded by	Stoffel Botha
Minister of Mines and Energy
In office 1979–1982
Prime Minister	Pieter Willem Botha
Preceded by	Stephanus Petrus Botha
Succeeded by	Pietie du Plessis
Minister of Sport and Recreation
In office 1978–1979
Prime Minister	Pieter Willem Botha
Preceded by	Piet Koornhof
Succeeded by	Gerrit Viljoen (National Education)
Minister of Posts and Telecommunications
In office 1978–1979
Prime Minister	Johannes Vorster; Pieter Willem Botha
Preceded by	Hendrik Smit
Succeeded by	Johannes Petrus van der Spuy
Minister of Social Welfare and Pensions
In office January 1978 – October 1978
Prime Minister	Johannes Vorster
Preceded by	Johannes Petrus van der Spuy
Succeeded by	Schalk van der Merwe

Personal details
- Born: Frederik Willem de Klerk; 18 March 1936 Johannesburg, Transvaal, Union of South Africa
- Died: 11 November 2021 (aged 85) Cape Town, Western Cape, South Africa
- Party: National (1972–1997)
- Other political affiliations: New National (1997–2005)
- Spouses: Marike Willemse (m. 1959; div. 1996) Elita Georgiades (m. 1999)
- Children: 3
- Parent: Jan de Klerk (father)
- Education: Potchefstroom University (BA, LLB)
- Occupation: Attorney; politician
- Awards: Nobel Peace Prize (1993)
- Website: Foundation

Frederik Willem de Klerk (Note: /də ˈklɜːrk, də ˈklɛərk/ də-KLURK, də-KLAIRK, Afrikaans: [ˈfriədərək ˈvələm də ˈklɛrk]) (18 March 1936 – 11 November 2021) was a South African politician who served as the final apartheid state president of South Africa from 1989 to 1994 and as deputy president from 1994 to 1996. As South Africa's last head of state from the era of white-minority rule, he and his government dismantled the apartheid system and introduced universal suffrage. Ideologically a social conservative and an economic liberal, he led the National Party (NP) from 1989 to 1997.

Born in Johannesburg to an influential Afrikaner family, de Klerk studied at Potchefstroom University before pursuing a career in law. Joining the NP, to which he had family ties, he was elected to parliament and sat in the white-minority government of P. W. Botha, holding a succession of ministerial posts. As a minister, he supported and enforced apartheid, a system of racial segregation that privileged white South Africans. After Botha resigned in 1989, de Klerk replaced him, first as leader of the NP and then as State President. Although observers expected him to continue Botha's defence of apartheid, de Klerk decided to end the policy. He was aware that growing ethnic animosity and violence was leading South Africa into a racial civil war. Amid this violence, the state security forces committed widespread human rights abuses and encouraged violence between the Xhosa and Zulu people, although de Klerk later denied sanctioning such actions. He permitted anti-apartheid marches to take place, legalised a range of previously banned anti-apartheid political parties, and freed imprisoned anti-apartheid activists such as Nelson Mandela. He also dismantled South Africa's nuclear weapons program.

De Klerk negotiated with Mandela to fully dismantle apartheid and establish a transition to universal suffrage. In 1993, he publicly apologised for apartheid's harmful effects. He oversaw the 1994 non-racial election in which Mandela led the African National Congress (ANC) to victory; de Klerk's NP took second place. Along with Thabo Mbeki, De Klerk then became one of the two deputy presidents in Mandela's ANC-led coalition, the Government of National Unity. In this position, de Klerk supported the government's continued liberal economic policies but opposed the Truth and Reconciliation Commission set up to investigate past human rights abuses; instead, he wanted total amnesty for political crimes. His working relationship with Mandela was strained, although he later spoke fondly of him. In May 1996, after the NP objected to the new constitution, de Klerk withdrew it from the coalition government. His party disbanded the following year and reformed as the New National Party. In 1997, de Klerk retired from active politics and thereafter lectured internationally.

De Klerk was a controversial figure. He received many awards—for instance sharing the Nobel Peace Prize with Mandela—for his role in dismantling apartheid and bringing universal suffrage to South Africa. Conversely, anti-apartheid activists criticised him for offering only a qualified apology for apartheid and for ignoring the human rights abuses of his state security forces, while pro-apartheid supporters contended that by abandoning apartheid, he betrayed the interests of the country's Afrikaner minority.

== Early life and education ==
=== Childhood: 1936–1954 ===
F. W. de Klerk was born on 18 March 1936, into a rich political family in Mayfair, a suburb of Johannesburg, Transvaal Province, Union of South Africa. His parents were Johannes "Jan" de Klerk and Hendrina Cornelia Coetzer—"her forefather was a Kutzer who stems from Austria." He was his parents' second son, having a brother, Willem de Klerk, who was eight years his senior. De Klerk's first language was Afrikaans and the earliest of his distant ancestors to arrive in what is now South Africa did so in the late 1680s.

De Klerk had a secure and comfortable upbringing, and his family had played a leading role in Afrikaner society; they had longstanding affiliations with South Africa's National Party. His paternal great-grandfather, Jan van Rooy, had been a Senator, while his paternal grandfather, Willem, had been a clergyman who fought in the Second Boer War and stood twice, unsuccessfully, as a National Party candidate. His paternal aunt's husband was J. G. Strijdom, a former Prime Minister. His own father, Jan de Klerk, was also a senator, served as the secretary of the National Party in Transvaal, president of the senate for seven years, acting state president, and as a member of the country's cabinet for fifteen years under three prime ministers. In this environment, de Klerk was exposed to politics from childhood. He and family members would be encouraged to hold family debates; his more conservative opinions would be challenged by his brother Willem, who was sympathetic to the more liberal, "enlightened" faction of the National Party. Willem became a political analyst and later split from the National Party to found the liberal Democratic Party.

The name "de Klerk" is derived from Le Clerc, Le Clercq and De Clercq, and is of French Huguenot origin (meaning "clergyman" or "literate" in old French). De Klerk noted that he was also of Dutch descent, with an Indian ancestor from the late-1690s or early 1700s. He was also said to have been descended from the Khoi interpreter known as Krotoa or Eva.

When de Klerk was twelve years old, the apartheid system was officially institutionalised by the South African government; his father had been one of its originators. He therefore was, according to his brother, "one of a generation that grew up with the concept of apartheid". He was inculturated in the norms and values of Afrikaner society, including festivals like Kruger Day, loyalty to the Afrikaner nation, and stories of the "age of injustice" that the Afrikaner faced under the British. He was brought up in the Gereformeerde Kerk, the smallest and most socially conservative of South Africa's three Dutch Reformed Churches.

The de Klerk family moved around South Africa during his childhood, and he changed schools seven times over seven years. He eventually became a boarder at the Hoërskool Monument (Monument High School) in Krugersdorp, where he graduated with a first-class pass in 1953. He was nevertheless disappointed not to get the four distinctions he was hoping for.

=== University and legal career ===
Between 1954 and 1958, de Klerk studied at Potchefstroom University, graduating with both a Bachelor of Arts and a Bachelor of Law. He later noted that during this legal training, he "became accustomed to thinking in terms of legal principles". While studying there, he became editor of the student newspaper, vice-chair of the student council, and a member of the Afrikaanse Studentebond's (a large South African youth movement) national executive council. At university, he was initiated into the Broederbond, a secret society for the Afrikaner social elite. As a student, he played both tennis and hockey and was known as "something of a ladies' man". At the university, he began a relationship with Marike Willemse, the daughter of a professor at the University of Pretoria. The couple married in 1959, when de Klerk was 23 and his wife was 22.

After university, de Klerk pursued a legal career, becoming an articled clerk with the firm Pelser in Klerksdorp. Relocating to Pretoria, he became an articled clerk for another law firm, Mac-Robert.

In 1962, he set up his own law partnership in Vereeniging, Transvaal, which he built into a successful business over ten years.

During this period, he involved himself in a range of other activities. He was the national chair of the Junior Rapportryers for two years, and chair of the Law Society of Vaal Triangle. He was also on the council of the local technikon, on the council of his church, and on a local school board.

=== Early political career ===
In 1972, his alma mater offered him a chair in its law faculty, which he accepted. Within a matter of days he was also approached by members of the National Party, who requested that he stand for the party at Vereeniging. De Klerk's candidature was successful and in November he was elected to the House of Assembly. There, he established a reputation as a formidable debater. He took on a number of roles in the party and government. He became the information officer of the Transvaal National Party, responsible for its propaganda output, and helped to establish a new National Party youth movement. He joined various party parliamentary study groups, including those on the Bantustans, labour, justice, and home affairs. As a member of various parliamentary groups, de Klerk went on several foreign visits, to Israel, West Germany, the United Kingdom, and the United States. It was in the latter in 1976 that he observed what he later described as the pervasive racism of US society, later noting that he "saw more racial incidents in one month there than in South Africa in a year". In South Africa, de Klerk also played a senior role in two select committees, one formulating a policy on opening hotels to non-Whites and the other formulating a new censorship law that was less strict than the one that had preceded it.

In 1975, Prime Minister John Vorster predicted that de Klerk would one day become leader of South Africa. Vorster planned to promote de Klerk to the position of a deputy minister in January 1976, but instead the job went to Andries Treurnicht. In April 1978, de Klerk was promoted to the position of Minister of Social Welfare and Pensions. In this role, he restored full autonomy to sporting control bodies which had for a time been under the jurisdiction of the government. As minister of Post and Telecommunications, he finalised contracts that oversaw the electrification of that sector. As Minister of Mining, he formalised a policy on coal exports and the structuring of Eskom and the Atomic Energy Corporation. He then became Minister of the Interior, he oversaw the repeal of the Mixed Marriages Act.

In 1981, de Klerk was awarded the Decoration for Meritorious Service for his work in the government. As education minister between 1984 and 1989, he upheld the apartheid system in South Africa's schools, and extended the department to cover all racial groups.

For most of his career, de Klerk had a very conservative reputation, and was seen as someone who would obstruct change in South Africa. He had been a forceful proponent of apartheid's system of racial segregation and was perceived as an advocate of the white minority's interests. While serving under P. W. Botha's government, de Klerk was never part of Botha's inner circle.

== State presidency (1989–1994) ==
P. W. Botha resigned as leader of the National Party after an apparent stroke, and de Klerk defeated Botha's preferred successor, finance minister Barend du Plessis, in the race to succeed him. On 2 February 1989, he was elected leader of the National Party. He defeated main rival Barend du Plessis to the position by a majority of eight votes, 69–61. Soon after, he called for the introduction of a new South African constitution, hinting that it would need to provide greater concession to non-white racial groups. After becoming party leader, de Klerk extended his foreign contacts. He travelled to London, where he met with British prime minister Margaret Thatcher. Although she opposed the anti-apartheid movement's calls for economic sanctions against South Africa, at the meeting she urged de Klerk to release the imprisoned anti-apartheid activist Nelson Mandela. He also expressed a desire to meet with representatives of the US government in Washington, D.C., although American secretary of state James Baker informed him that the US government considered it inopportune to have de Klerk meet with President George H. W. Bush.

=== Becoming State President of South Africa ===
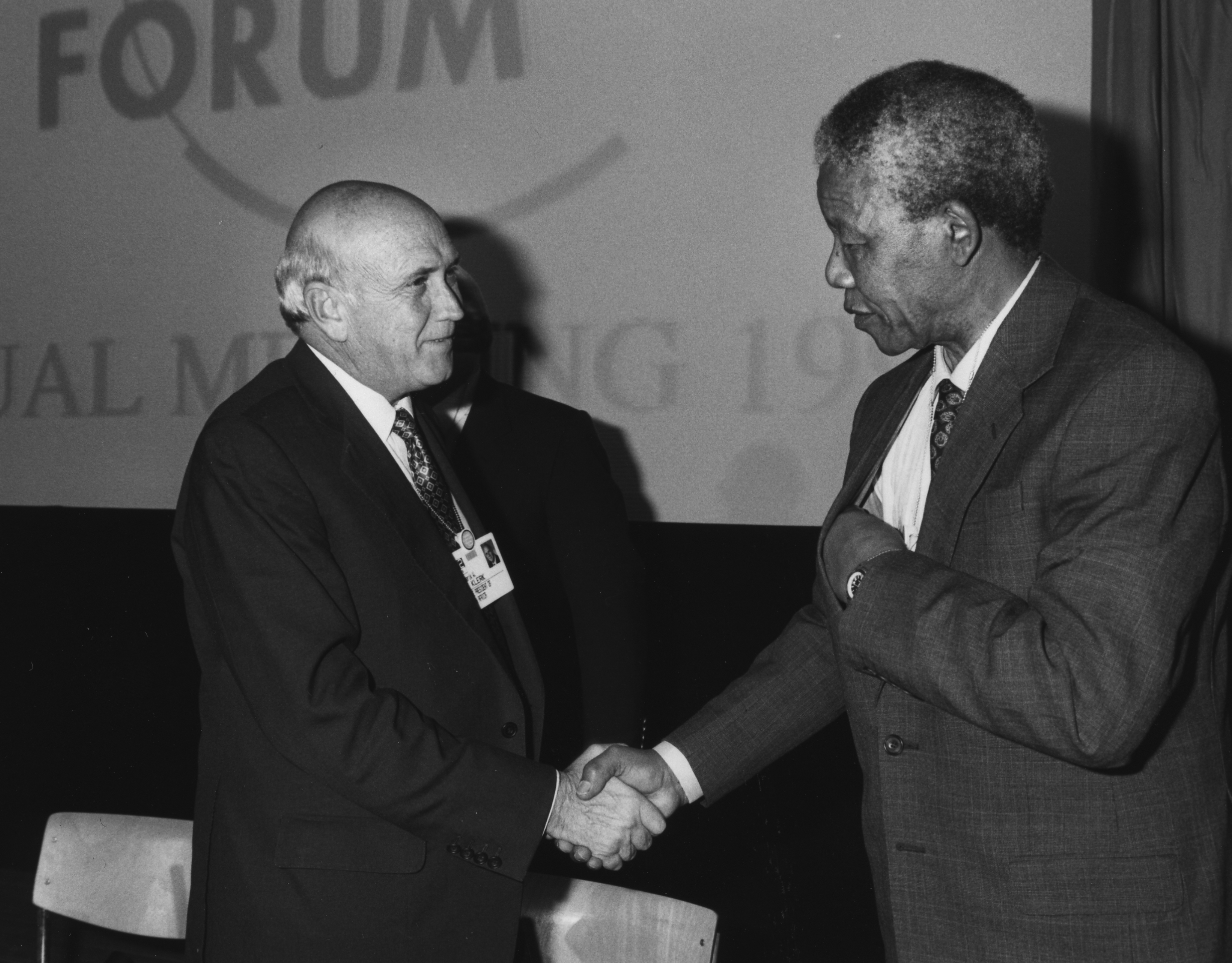
de Klerk and Nelson Mandela shake hands at the Annual Meeting of the World Economic Forum held in Davos, January 1992

Botha resigned on 14 August 1989, and de Klerk was named acting State President of South Africa until 20 September, when he was elected to a full five-year term as State President. After he became acting State President, ANC leaders spoke out against him, believing that he would be no different from his predecessors; he was widely regarded as a staunch supporter of apartheid. The prominent anti-apartheid activist Desmond Tutu shared this assessment, stating: "I don't think we've got to even begin to pretend that there is any reason for thinking that we are entering a new phase. It's just musical chairs". Tutu and Allan Boesak had been planning a protest march in Cape Town, which the security chiefs wanted to prevent. De Klerk nevertheless turned down their proposal to ban it, agreeing to let the march proceed and stating that "the door to a new South Africa is open, it is not necessary to batter it down". The march took place and was attended by approximately 30,000 people. Further protest marches followed in Grahamstown, Johannesburg, Pretoria, and Durban. De Klerk later noted that his security forces could not have prevented the marchers from gathering: "The choice, therefore, was between breaking up an illegal march with all of the attendant risks of violence and negative publicity, or of allowing the march to continue, subject to conditions that could help to avoid violence and ensure good public order." This decision marked a clear departure from the Botha era.

As State President, he authorised the continuation of secret talks in Geneva between his National Intelligence Service and two exiled ANC leaders, Thabo Mbeki and Jacob Zuma. In October, he personally agreed to meet with Tutu, Boesak, and Frank Chikane in a private meeting in Pretoria. That month, he also released a number of elderly anti-apartheid activists then imprisoned, including Walter Sisulu. He also ordered the closure of the National Security Management System. In December he visited Mandela in prison, speaking with him for three hours about the idea of transitioning away from white-minority rule. The collapse of the Eastern Bloc and the dissolution of the Soviet Union meant that he no longer feared that Marxists would manipulate the ANC. As he later related, the collapse of "the Marxist economic system in Eastern Europe... serves as a warning to those who insist on persisting with it in Africa. Those who seek to force this failure of a system on South Africa should engage in a total revision of their point of view. It should be clear to all that it is not the answer here either."

History has placed a tremendous responsibility on the shoulders of this country's leadership, namely the responsibility of moving our country away from the current course of conflict and confrontation... The hope of millions of South Africans is fixed on us. The future of southern Africa depends on us. We dare not waver or fail.

— de Klerk's speech to Parliament, February 1990

On 2 February 1990, in an address to the country's parliament, he introduced plans for sweeping reforms of the political system. A number of banned political parties, including the ANC and Communist Party of South Africa, would be legalised, although he emphasised that this did not constitute an endorsement of their socialist economic policies nor of violent actions carried out by their members. All of those who were imprisoned solely for belonging to a banned organisation would be freed, including Nelson Mandela; the latter was released a week later. He also announced the lifting of the Separate Amenities Act of 1953, which governed the segregation of public facilities. The vision set forth in de Klerk's address was for South Africa to become a Western-style liberal democracy; with a market-oriented economy which valued private enterprise and restricted the government's role in economics.

De Klerk later related that "that speech was mainly aimed at breaking our stalemate in Africa and the West. Internationally we were teetering on the edge of the abyss." Throughout South Africa and across the world, there was astonishment at de Klerk's move. Foreign press coverage was largely positive and de Klerk received messages of support from other governments. Tutu said that "It's incredible... Give him credit. Give him credit, I do." Some black radicals regarded it as a gimmick and that it would prove to be without substance. It was also received negatively by some on the white right-wing, including in the Conservative Party, who believed that de Klerk was betraying the white population. De Klerk believed that the sudden growth of the Conservatives and other white right-wing groups was a passing phase reflecting anxiety and insecurity. These white right-wing groups were aware that they would not get what they wanted through the forthcoming negotiations, and so increasingly tried to derail the negotiations using reactionary violence. The white-dominated liberal Democratic Party, meanwhile, found itself in limbo, as de Klerk embraced much of the platform it had espoused, leaving it without a clear purpose.

Further reforms followed; membership of the National Party was opened up to non-whites. In June, parliament approved new legislation that repealed the Natives Land Act, 1913 and Native Trust and Land Act, 1936. The Population Registration Act, which established the racial classificatory guidelines for South Africa, was rescinded.

In 1990, de Klerk gave orders to end South Africa's nuclear weapons programme; the process of nuclear disarmament was essentially completed in 1991. The existence of the nuclear programme was not officially acknowledged before 1993.

=== Negotiations toward universal suffrage ===
I believe the new political order will and must contain the following elements: a democratic constitution, universal suffrage, no domination, equality before an independent judiciary, the protection of minorities and individual rights, freedom of religion, a healthy economy based on proven economic principles and private initiative, and a dynamic programme for better education, health services, housing and social conditions for all... I am not talking of a rosy and tranquil future, but I believe the broad mainstream of South Africans will gradually build up South Africa into a society that will be worth living and working in.

— de Klerk on a post-apartheid society

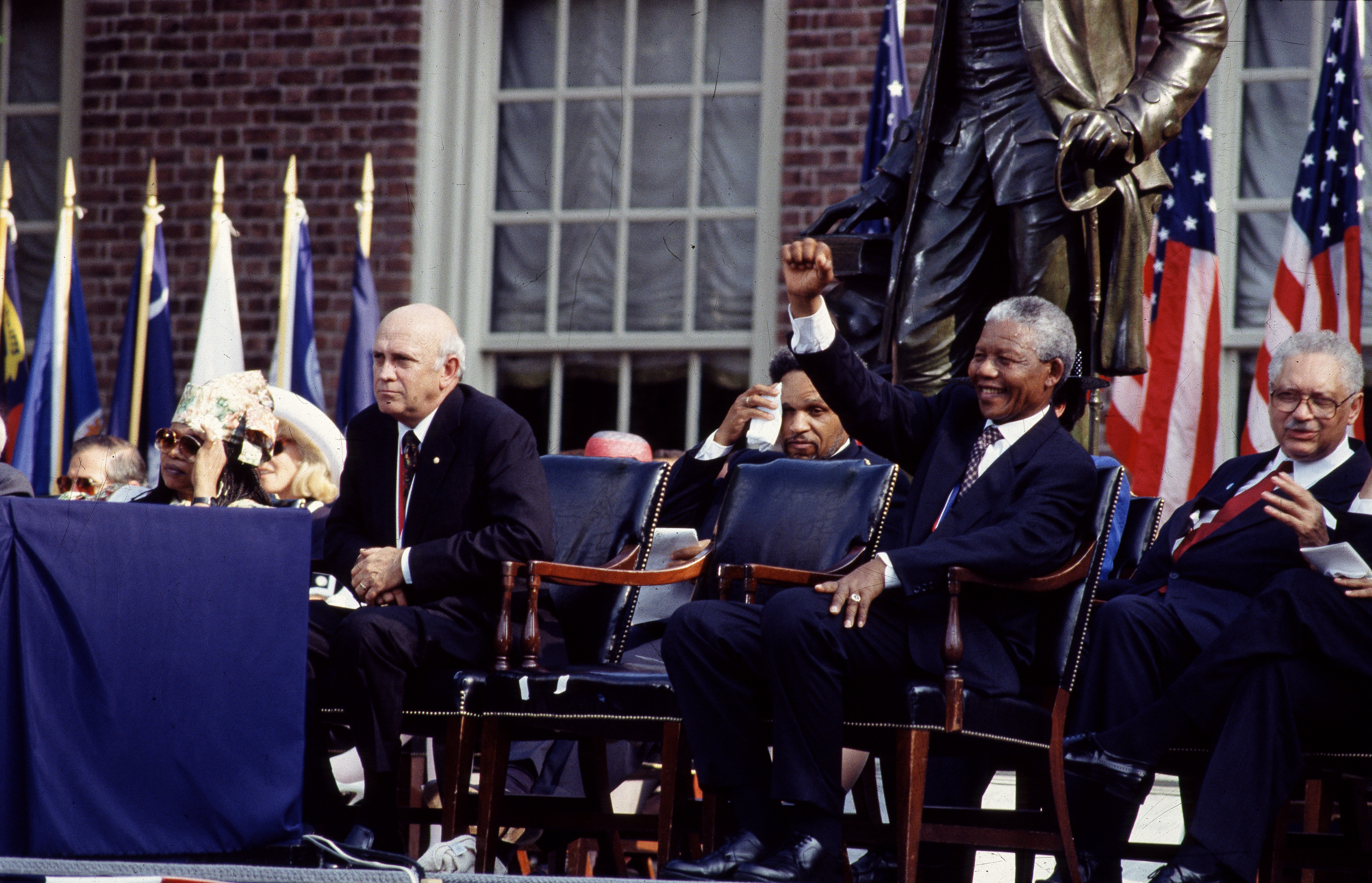
de Klerk and Nelson Mandela, near the close of negotiations, in Philadelphia, Pennsylvania to receive jointly the Liberty Medal, July 1993

His presidency was dominated by the negotiation process, mainly between his NP government and the ANC, which led to the democratisation of South Africa. On 17 March 1992, de Klerk held a whites-only referendum on ending apartheid. More than two thirds of voters made a "yes" vote to continue negotiations to end apartheid.

Nelson Mandela was distrustful of the role played by de Klerk in the negotiations, particularly as he believed that de Klerk was knowledgeable about 'third force' attempts to foment violence in the country and destabilise the negotiations. De Klerk's possible role in the 'third force' came to the attention of the Truth and Reconciliation Commission, but was ultimately never clarified. De Klerk was accused by writer Anthony Sampson of complicity in the violence among the ANC, the Inkatha Freedom Party and elements of the security forces. He also accused de Klerk of permitting his ministers to build their own criminal empires.

On 17 July 1992, the Boipatong massacre by the Inkatha Freedom Party occurred, killing 45 people. The massacre caused a resurgence of international pressure against South Africa over claims of police collusion, leading to a weaker position at the negotiation tables for the National Party. The Goldstone Commission concluded there was no evidence of police collusion in the massacre.

On 30 April 1993, de Klerk issued an apology for the actions of the apartheid government, stating that: "It was not our intention to deprive people of their rights and to cause misery, but eventually apartheid led to just that. Insofar as to what occurred we deeply regret it... Yes we are sorry". Tutu urged people to accept the apology, stating that "saying sorry is not an easy thing to do... We should be magnanimous and accept it as a magnanimous act", although Tutu was privately frustrated that de Klerk's apology had been qualified and had not gone so far as to call apartheid an intrinsically evil policy.

De Klerk authorised the raid on Mthatha against suspected Azanian People's Liberation Army (APLA) fighters on 8 October 1993 that killed three teenagers and two twelve year olds. The Minister of Defence said the raid had been undertaken to pre-empt attacks by the APLA on civilians and that one of the victims had brandished a weapon. The Truth and Reconciliation Commission concluded the raid was a "gross violation of human rights"

On 10 December 1993, de Klerk and Mandela were jointly awarded the Nobel Peace Prize in Oslo for their work in ending apartheid.

South Africa held its first universal elections in 1994 from 26 to 29 April. The ANC won the election with 62 per cent, while the National Party received 20 per cent. De Klerk became deputy president in the national unity government under Nelson Mandela.

== Deputy presidency (1994–1996) ==
De Klerk had been unhappy that changes had been made to the inauguration ceremony, rendering it multi-religious rather than reflecting the newly elected leader's particular denomination. When he was being sworn in, and the chief justice said "So help me God", de Klerk did not repeat this, instead stating, in Afrikaans: "So help me the triune God, Father, Son, and Holy Spirit".

Mandela reappointed de Klerk's finance minister, Derek Keys, and retained Chris Stals, a former member of the Broederbond, as the Governor of the South African Reserve Bank. De Klerk supported the coalition's economic policies, stating that it "accepted a broad framework of responsible economic policies".

De Klerk's working relationship with Mandela was often strained, with the former finding it difficult adjusting to the fact that he was no longer State President. De Klerk also felt that Mandela deliberately humiliated him, while Mandela found de Klerk to be needlessly provocative in cabinet. One dispute occurred in September 1995, after Mandela gave a Johannesburg speech criticising the National Party. Angered, de Klerk avoided Mandela until the latter requested they meet. The two ran into each other, and they publicly argued in the streets. Mandela later expressed regret for their disagreement but did not apologise for his original comments. De Klerk was also having problems from within his own party, some of whose members claimed that he was neglecting the party while in the government.

Many in the National Party—including many members of its executive committee—were unhappy with the other parties' agreed upon new constitution in May 1996. The party had wanted the constitution to guarantee that it would be represented in the government until 2004, although it did not do so. On 9 May, de Klerk withdrew the National Party from the coalition government. The decision shocked several of his six fellow Afrikaner cabinet colleagues; Pik Botha, for example, was left without a job as a result. Roelf Meyer felt betrayed by de Klerk's act, while Leon Wessels thought that de Klerk had not tried hard enough to make the coalition work. De Klerk declared that he would lead the National Party in vigorous opposition to Mandela's government to ensure "a proper multi-party democracy, without which there may be a danger of South Africa lapsing into the African pattern of one-party states".

=== Truth and Reconciliation Commission ===
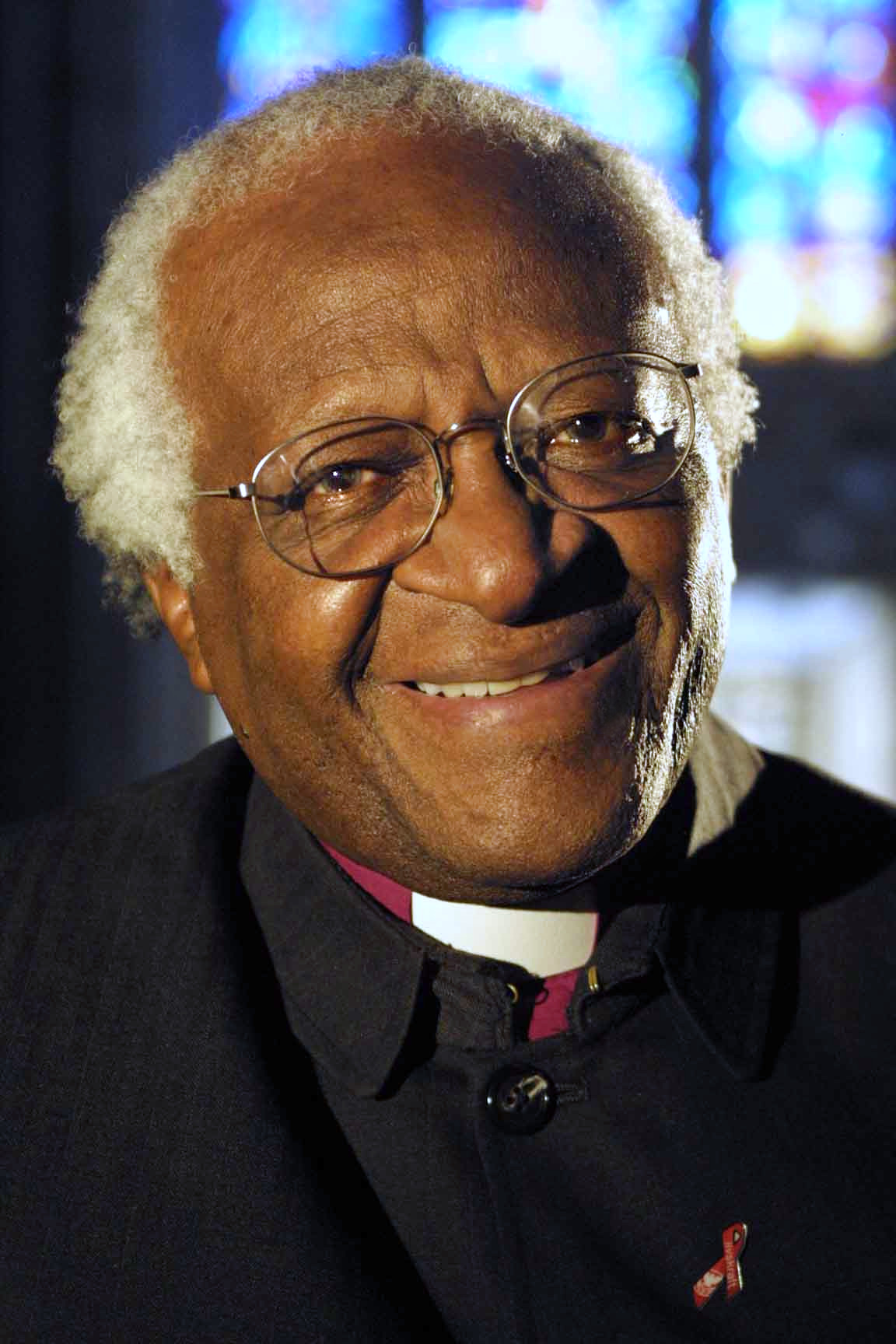
The chair of the TRC, Desmond Tutu, was frustrated that de Klerk did not take responsibility for the actions of the state security services in the early 1990s

In de Klerk's view, his greatest defeat in the negotiations with Mandela had been his inability to secure a blanket amnesty for all those working for the government or state during the apartheid period. De Klerk was unhappy with the formation of the Truth and Reconciliation Commission (TRC). He had hoped that the TRC would be made up of an equal number of individuals from both the old and new governments, as there had been in the Chilean human rights commission. Instead, the TRC was designed to broadly reflect the wider diversity of South African society, and contained only two members who had explicitly supported apartheid, one a member of a right-wing group that had opposed de Klerk's National Party. De Klerk did not object to Tutu being selected as the TRC's chair for he regarded him as politically independent of Mandela's government, but he was upset that the white Progressive Party MP Alex Boraine had been selected as its deputy chair, later saying of Boraine: "beneath an urbane and deceptively affable exterior beat the heart of a zealot and an inquisitor."

De Klerk appeared before the TRC hearing to testify for Vlakplaas commanders who were accused of having committed human rights abuses during the apartheid era. He acknowledged that security forces had resorted to "unconventional strategies" in dealing with anti-apartheid revolutionaries, but that "within my knowledge and experience, they never included the authorization of assassination, murder, torture, rape, assault or the like". After further evidence of said abuses was produced by the commission, de Klerk stated that he found the revelations to be "as shocking and as abhorrent as anybody else" but insisted that he and other senior party members were not willing to accept responsibility for the "criminal actions of a handful of operatives", stating that their behaviour was "not authorized [and] not intended" by his government. Given the widespread and systemic nature of the abuses that had taken place, as well as statements by security officers that their actions had been sanctioned by higher ranking figures, Tutu questioned how de Klerk and other government figures could not have been aware of them. Tutu had hoped that de Klerk or another senior white political figure from the apartheid era would openly accept responsibility for the human rights abuses, thereby allowing South Africa to move on; this was something that de Klerk would not do.

The TRC found de Klerk guilty of being an accessory to gross violations of human rights on the basis that as State President he had been told that P. W. Botha had authorised the bombing of Khotso House but had not revealed this information to the committee. De Klerk challenged the TRC on this point, and it backed down. When the final TRC report was released in 2002, it made a more limited accusation: that de Klerk had failed to give full disclosure about events that took place during his presidency and that in view of his knowledge about the Khotso House bombing, his statement that none of his colleagues had authorised gross human rights abuses was "indefensible". In his later autobiography, de Klerk acknowledged that the TRC did significant damage to his public image.

== Later life ==
In 1994, de Klerk was elected to the American Philosophical Society.

In 1997, de Klerk was offered the Harper Fellowship at Yale Law School. He declined, citing protests at the university. De Klerk did, however, speak at Central Connecticut State University the day before his fellowship would have begun.

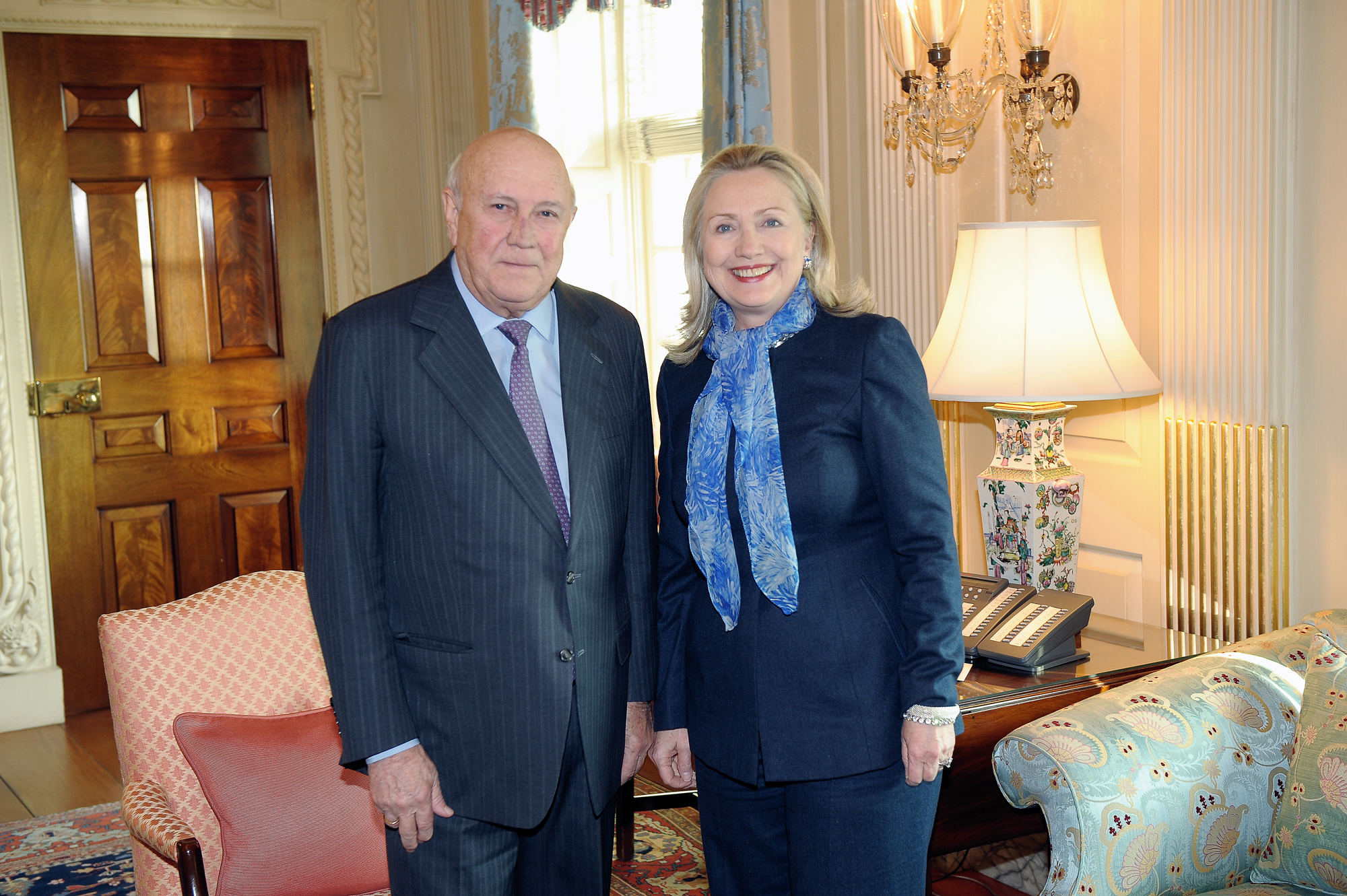
de Klerk with U.S. secretary of state Hillary Clinton in 2012

In 1999, de Klerk and his wife of 38 years, Marike de Klerk, were divorced following the discovery of his affair with Elita Georgiades, then the wife of Tony Georgiades, a Greek shipping tycoon who had allegedly given de Klerk and the NP financial support. Soon after his divorce, de Klerk and Georgiades were married. His divorce and remarriage scandalised conservative South African opinion, especially among the Calvinist Afrikaners. In 1999, his autobiography, The Last Trek – A New Beginning, was published. In 2002, following the murder of his former wife, the manuscript of her own autobiography, A Place Where the Sun Shines Again, was submitted to de Klerk, who urged the publishers to remove a chapter dealing with his infidelity.

In 2000, de Klerk established the pro-peace FW de Klerk Foundation of which he was the chairman. De Klerk was also chairman of the Global Leadership Foundation, headquartered in London, which he set up in 2004, an organisation which works to support democratic leadership, prevent and resolve conflict through mediation and promote good governance in the form of democratic institutions, open markets, human rights and the rule of law. It does so by making available, discreetly and in confidence, the experience of former leaders to today's national leaders. It is a not-for-profit organisation composed of former heads of government and senior governmental and international organisation officials who work closely with heads of government on governance-related issues of concern to them.

On 3 December 2001, Marike de Klerk was found stabbed and strangled to death in her Cape Town flat. De Klerk, who was on a brief visit to Stockholm, Sweden, to celebrate the 100-year anniversary of the Nobel Prize foundation, immediately returned to mourn his dead ex-wife. The atrocity was condemned by South African president Thabo Mbeki and Winnie Mandela, who openly spoke in favour of Marike de Klerk. On 6 December 21-year-old security guard Luyanda Mboniswa was arrested for the murder. On 15 May 2003, he received two life sentences for murder, as well as three years for breaking into Marike de Klerk's apartment.

In 2005, de Klerk quit the New National Party and sought a new political home after the NNP merged with the ruling ANC. That same year, while giving an interview to US journalist Richard Stengel, de Klerk was asked whether South Africa had turned out the way he envisioned it back in 1990. His response was:

There are a number of imperfections in the new South Africa where I would have hoped that things would be better, but on balance I think we have basically achieved what we set out to achieve. And if I were to draw balance sheets on where South Africa stands now, I would say that the positive outweighs the negative by far. There is a tendency by commentators across the world to focus on the few negatives which are quite negative, like how are we handling AIDS, like our role vis-à-vis Zimbabwe. But the positives – the stability in South Africa, the adherence to well-balanced economic policies, fighting inflation, doing all the right things in order to lay the basis and the foundation for sustained economic growth – are in place.

In 2008, he repeated in a speech that "despite all the negatives facing South Africa, he was very positive about the country".

In 2006, he underwent surgery for a malignant tumor in his colon. His condition deteriorated sharply, and he underwent a tracheotomy after developing respiratory problems. He recovered and on 11 September 2006 gave a speech at Kent State University Stark Campus.

In January 2007, de Klerk was a speaker promoting peace and democracy in the world at the "Towards a Global Forum on New Democracies" event in Taipei, Taiwan, along with other dignitaries including Poland's Lech Wałęsa and Taiwan's president Chen Shui-Bian.

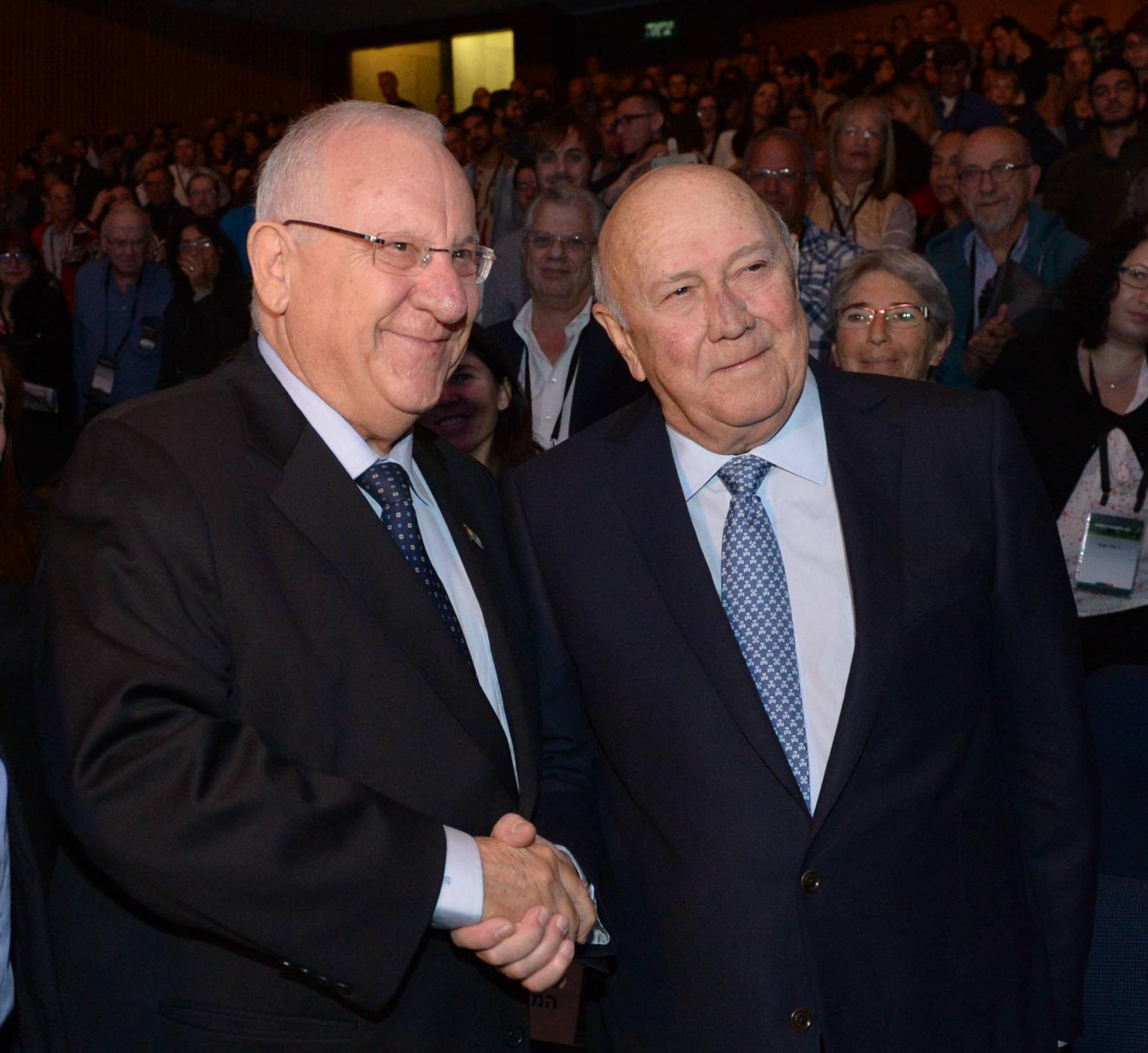
de Klerk with Israeli president Reuven Rivlin in 2015

De Klerk was an Honorary Patron of the University Philosophical Society of Trinity College Dublin, and Honorary Chairman of the Prague Society for International Cooperation. He also received the gold medal for Outstanding Contribution to Public Discourse from the College Historical Society of Trinity College, Dublin, for his contribution to ending apartheid.

De Klerk was also a member of the advisory board of the Global Panel Foundation based in Berlin, Copenhagen, New York, Prague, Sydney and Toronto—founded by the Dutch entrepreneur Bas Spuybroek in 1988, with the support of Dutch billionaire Frans Lurvink and former Dutch Foreign Minister Hans van den Broek. The Global Panel Foundation is known for its behind-the-scenes work in public policy and the annual presentation of the Hanno R. Ellenbogen Citizenship Award with the Prague Society for International Cooperation.

De Klerk was a member of the advisory board of the WORLD.MINDS Foundation, based in Switzerland. WORLD.MINDS is known for establishing close personal ties between leaders in government, science and business.

After the inauguration of Jacob Zuma as South Africa's president in May 2009, de Klerk said he was optimistic that Zuma and his government can "confound the prophets of doom".

In a BBC interview broadcast in April 2012, he said he lived in an all-white neighbourhood. He had five servants, three coloured and two black: "We are one great big family together; we have the best of relationships." About Nelson Mandela, he said, "When Mandela goes it will be a moment when all South Africans put away their political differences, will take hands, and will together honour maybe the biggest known South African that has ever lived."

De Klerk received a pacemaker in July 2013.

Upon hearing of the death of Mandela, de Klerk said: "He was a great unifier and a very, very special man in this regard beyond everything else he did. This emphasis on reconciliation was his biggest legacy." He attended the memorial service for him on 10 December 2013.

In 2015, de Klerk wrote to The Times newspaper in the UK criticising a campaign to remove a statue of Cecil Rhodes from Oriel College, Oxford. He was subsequently criticised by some activists who described it as "ironic" that the last apartheid president should be defending a statue of a man labelled by critics as the "architect of apartheid". South Africa's far-left Economic Freedom Fighters called for him to be stripped of his Nobel Peace Prize. In 2020, de Klerk told an interviewer that "the idea that apartheid was a crime against humanity was and remains an agitprop project initiated by the Soviets and their ANC/SACP allies to stigmatize white South Africans by associating them with genuine crimes against humanity." This generated controversy in South Africa, and further calls for the removal of his Nobel Prize. De Klerk's Foundation retracted his statement several days later.

=== Illness and death ===
Allow me in this last message to share with you the fact that since the early 80s, my views changed completely. It was as if I had a conversion. And in my heart of hearts, I realized that apartheid was wrong. I realized that we had arrived at a place which was morally unjustifiable. My conversion, to which I refer didn't end with the admission to myself of the total unacceptability of apartheid. It motivated us in the National Party to take the initiatives we took from the time that I became leader of the National Party. And more specifically, during my presidency. We did not only admit the wrongness of apartheid, we took far-reaching measures to ensure negotiation and a new dispensation which could bring justice to all.

— de Klerk's final message

On 19 March 2021, a day after his 85th birthday, it was announced that de Klerk had been diagnosed with mesothelioma. He died from complications of the disease in his sleep at his home in Fresnaye, Cape Town on 11 November 2021, at the age of 85. He was the last surviving State President of South Africa.

After his death, a video message from de Klerk was released from the FW de Klerk Foundation, apologising "without qualification" for the harm caused from apartheid and pleading that the government and all South Africans would embrace the constitution in a balanced manner while also promoting economic growth, guarding the independence and impartiality of the courts, as well as promoting non-racialism and non-discrimination in South Africa.

On 16 November 2021, President Cyril Ramaphosa declared a four-day mourning period for de Klerk and ordered for all of the national South African flags to fly at half-mast from 17 to 21 November "as a mark of respect." Though the de Klerk family determined that he would have a private cremation and funeral, the South African government agreed to hold a state memorial service for de Klerk "in which government leaders, leaders of political parties and representatives of civil society will participate" at a later date. The state memorial service was held in Cape Town on 12 December 2021, and saw Ramaphosa deliver the keynote speech.

== Political positions ==
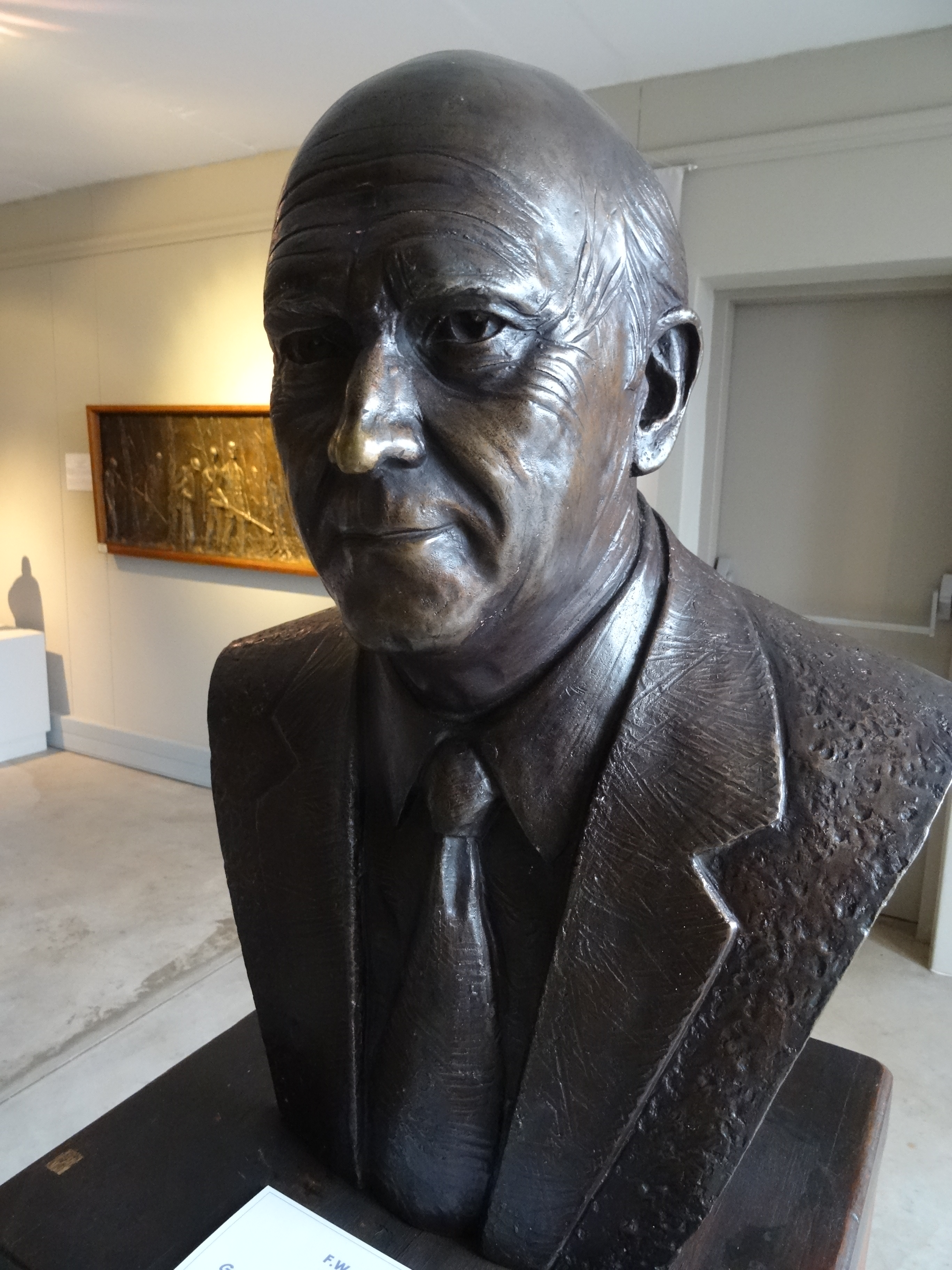
Bust of de Klerk at the Voortrekker Monument, Pretoria

De Klerk was widely regarded as a politically conservative figure in South Africa. At the same time, he was flexible rather than dogmatic in his approach to political issues. He often hedged his bets and sought to accommodate divergent perspectives, favouring compromise over confrontation.

Within the National Party, he continually strove for unity, coming to be regarded—according to his brother—as "a party man, a veritable Mr National Party". To stem defections from the right-wing end of the National Party, he made "ultra-conservative noises". This general approach led to the perception that he was "trying to be all things to all men".

De Klerk stated that within the party, he "never formed part of a political school of thought, and I deliberately kept out of the cliques and foments of the enlightened and conservative factions in the party. If the policy I propounded was ultra-conservative, then that was the policy; it was not necessarily I who was ultra-conservative. I saw my role in the party as that of an interpreter of the party's real median policy at any stage."

De Klerk stated that "The silver thread throughout my career was my advocacy of National Party policy in all its various formulations. I refrained from adjusting that policy or adapting it to my own liking or convictions. I analyzed it as it was formulated, to the letter."

For much of his career, de Klerk believed in apartheid and its system of racial segregation. According to his brother, de Klerk underwent a "political conversion" that took him from supporting apartheid to facilitating its demolition. This change was not "a dramatic event" however, but "was built... on pragmatism – it evolved as a process."

He did not believe that South Africa would become a "non-racial society", but rather sought to build a "non-racist society" in which ethnic divisions remained; in his view "I do not believe in the existence of anything like a non-racial society in the literal sense of the word", citing the example of the United States and United Kingdom where there was no legal racial segregation but that distinct racial groups continued to exist.

De Klerk accepted the principle of freedom of religion, although still believed that the state should promote Christianity.

De Klerk wrote in opposition to gender-based violence, arguing that "holding perpetrators accountable, irrespective of how long ago the crime was committed, is essential to stamping out impunity and preventing future atrocities".

== Personality and personal life ==
Glad and Blanton stated that de Klerk's "political choices were undergirded by self-confidence and commitment to the common good." His brother Willem stated that de Klerk's demeanour was marked by "soberness, humility and calm", that he was an honest, intelligent, and open-minded individual, and that he had a "natural cordiality" and a "solid sense of courtesy and good manners". He felt that de Klerk's "charisma" came not from an "exceptionally strong individualism" but from "his rationality, logic and balance". He was, according to de Klerk, "a man of compromise rather than a political innovator or entrepreneur".

Willem stated that "he keeps an ear to the ground and is sensitive to the slightest tremors", and that it was this which made him "a superb politician". Willem also stated that his brother was "a team-man who consults others, takes them into his confidence, honestly shares information with his colleagues, and has a knack of making people feel importance and at peace".

His former wife Marike described de Klerk as being "extremely sensitive to beautiful things", exhibiting something akin to an artistic temperament.

Willem also noted that "in the most profound sense", de Klerk was driven by his concern for Afrikanerdom and "the survival of his own people in their fatherland". De Klerk was deeply upset that many Afrikaners did not realise that his reforms to dismantle apartheid were carried out with the intention of preserving a future for the Afrikaner people in South Africa. De Klerk was a Christian and a member of the Reformed Churches in South Africa.

With Marike, de Klerk had three children: Susan, who became a teacher, Jan, who became a farmer in Western Transvaal, and Willem, who went into public relations. Willem stated that de Klerk had a close relationship with his children, and that he was "a loving man who hugs and cuddles".

De Klerk was a heavy smoker but gave up smoking towards the end of 2005. He also enjoyed a glass of whisky or wine while relaxing. He enjoyed playing golf and hunting, as well as going for brisk walks.

De Klerk's Nobel Prize medal was stolen from his home in November 2022.

== Reception and legacy ==
Glad and Blanton stated that de Klerk, along with Mandela, "accomplished the rare feat of bringing about systemic revolution through peaceful means." His brother noted that de Klerk's role in South African history was "to dismantle more than three centuries of white supremacy", and that in doing so his was "not a role of white surrender, but a role of white conversion to a new role" in society. In September 1990, Potchefstroom University for Christian Higher Education awarded de Klerk an honorary doctorate.

South Africa's Conservative Party came to regard him as its most hated adversary.

De Klerk was sub-Saharan Africa's last white president until Guy Scott became caretaker President of Zambia from 2014 to 2015.

== Notes ==
Political offices
Preceded by P. W. Botha	State President of South Africa; 1989–1994	Succeeded by Nelson Mandela as President of South Africa
New title	Deputy President of South Africa; 1994–1996; Served alongside: Thabo Mbeki	Succeeded by Thabo Mbeki
