= Owen Horwood =

South African politician (1916–1998)

Owen Pieter Faure Horwood DMS

Minister of Finance
- In office 1975–1984
- Prime Minister: B.J. Vorster→P.W. Botha
- Preceded by: Nico Diederichs
- Succeeded by: Barend du Plessis

Minister of Trade and Industry
- In office 1974–1975
- Prime Minister: B.J. Vorster

Minister of Tourism and Indian Affairs
- In office 1972 – 29 April 1974
- Prime Minister: B.J. Vorster

Personal details
- Born: 6 December 1916 Pietermaritzburg, Natal, Union of South Africa
- Died: 13 September 1998 (aged 81) Stellenbosch, Western Cape, South Africa
- Party: National Party

Owen Pieter Faure Horwood, DMS (6 December 1916 – 13 September 1998) was a South African economist, politician, leader of the National Party in the province of Natal and Finance Minister 1975 to 1984. He was married to Helen Watt, who was the sister of Janet Smith - the wife of Ian Smith, the Prime Minister of Rhodesia.

After matriculating at Paarl Boys’ High School, Horwood studied at the University of Cape Town where he obtained his B.Com degree and a post-graduate diploma in actuarial science. He worked in Cape Town until 1947 when he was appointed Senior Lecturer in Commerce at the University of Cape Town. In 1954, he became an associate professor at that university and in 1956, Professor in Economics at the University College of Rhodesia and Nyasaland in Salisbury.

Horwood was then appointed professor of economics on the Durban campus of the University of Natal, but his conservative, pro-apartheid views were not known to his colleagues or students. In 1965, Horwood became principal and vice-chancellor of the University, a generally liberal, anti-apartheid institution. Horwood soon became unpopular at the University, where he was considered authoritarian. In 1970, after major disputes with the study body and the University's governing council, he resigned from the University and was quickly appointed to the South African Senate by the National Party. The then prime minister B.J. Vorster appointed him to the cabinet as Minister of Tourism and Indian Affairs in 1972. He was elected leader of the National Party in Natal and held that position until 1984. In 1974, he was appointed Minister of Trade and Industry, and in February 1975 Minister of Finance. On his retirement from politics, he held the position of executive chairman of Nedbank until 1993.

Horwood retired from politics in 1984 and moved from Gauteng to Stellenbosch in 1997. He died of a heart attack in 1998 in Stellenbosch.

Political offices
Preceded by Nicolaas Johannes Diederichs	Minister of Finance; 1975–1984	Succeeded by Barend du Plessis
