= First cabinet of D. F. Malan =

First Malan Cabinet
- 10th Cabinet of the Union of South Africa (since the 1909 South Africa Act)
- 1948–1953
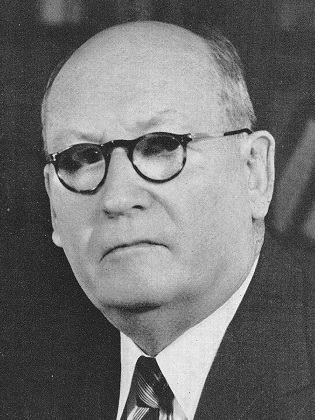
- Daniël Malan
- Date formed: 26 May 1948
- Date dissolved: 15 April 1953 (4 years, 10 months and 20 days)

People and organisations
- Monarch: King George VI (until 1952); Queen Elizabeth II
- Governor-General: Gideon van Zyl (until 1951); Ernest Jansen
- Prime Minister: Daniël Malan
- Member parties: National Party
- Status in legislature: Majority
- Opposition parties: United Party
- Opposition leaders: Jan Smuts

History
- Election: 1948 election
- Predecessor: Smuts III
- Successor: Malan II

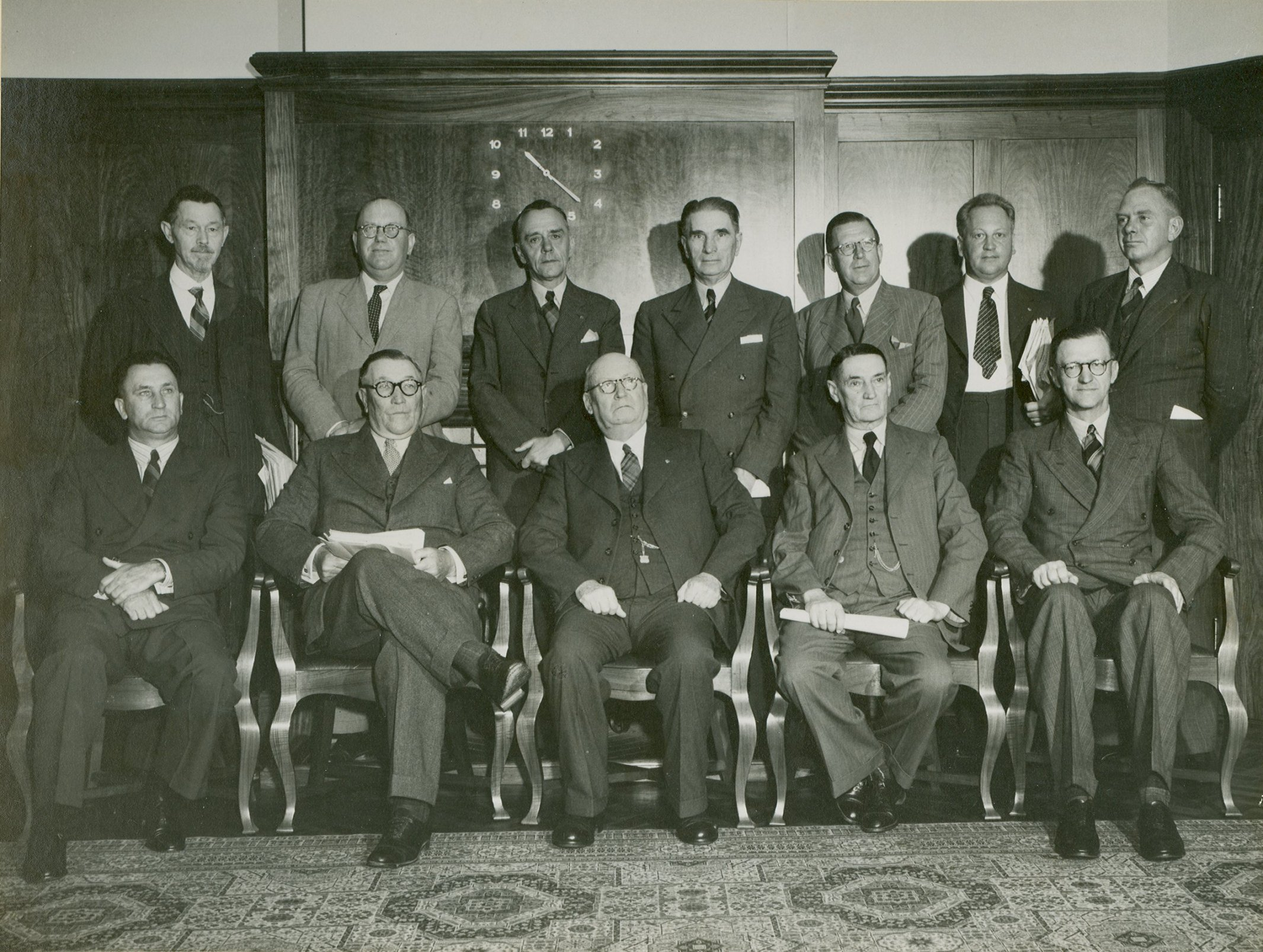
(c.1948) Front (left to right): J. G. Strydom, N. C. Havenga, D. F. Malan, E. G. Jansen, and C. R. Swart. Back (left to right): A. J. Stals, P. O. Sauer, E. H. Louw, S. P. le Roux, T. E. Dönges, F. C. Erasmus, and B. J. Schoeman.

The National Party under Daniël Malan was elected by a majority of seats, but a minority of votes, in the 1948 South African general election.

== Shuffle ==
- The Minister of Education, Health and Social Welfare was replaced by Dr. Karl Bremer on 12 February 1951. The previous Minister, The Hon. A.J. Stals MP, died shortly after in March of the same year.
- The Minister of Natural Affairs was replaced by Hendrik Verwoerd in 1950.

== Cabinet ==
Post	Minister	Term		Party
Prime Minister	Dr. Daniël Malan	1948	–	NP
Minister of Agriculture	The Hon. S. P. le Roux MP	1948	–	NP
Minister of Defence	The Hon. F. C. Erasmus MP	1948	–	NP
Minister of Economic Affairs	The Hon. E. H. Louw MP	1948	–	NP
Minister of Education, Arts and Science	The Hon. J. H. Viljoen MP	1950	–	NP
Minister of Education, Arts and Science	The Hon. Charles Swart MP	1949	1950	NP
Minister of Finance	The Hon. N. C. Havenga MP	1948	–	AP; NP
Minister of Foreign Affairs	Dr. Daniël Malan	1948	–	NP
Minister of Forestry	The Hon. F. C. Erasmus MP	1956	–	NP
Minister of Forestry	The Hon. S. P. le Roux MP	1948	1949	NP
Minister of Health	The Hon. Karl Bremer MP	1951	1953	NP
Minister of Health	The Hon. A. J. Stals MP	1948	1951	NP
Minister of Interior Affairs	The Hon. Eben Dönges MP	1948	–	NP
Minister of Justice	The Hon. Charles Swart MP	1948	–	NP
Minister of Labour	The Hon. B. J. Schoeman MP	1948	–	NP
Minister of Lands and Irrigation	The Hon. Johannes Strydom MP	1948	–	NP
Minister of Mines	The Hon. J. H. Viljoen MP	1950	1953	NP
Minister of Mines	The Hon. E. H. Louw MP	1948	1949	NP
Minister of Native Affairs	The Hon. Hendrik Verwoerd MP	1950	–	HNP
Minister of Native Affairs	The Hon. Ernest Jansen MP	1948	1950	HNP
Minister of Posts and Telegraphs	The Hon. Tom Naudé MP	1950	–	NP
Minister of Posts and Telegraphs	The Hon. F. C. Erasmus MP	1948	1950	HNP
Minister of Public Works	The Hon. B. J. Schoeman MP	1948	–	NP
Minister of Transport	The Hon. P. O. Sauer MP	1948	–	NP

== Sources ==
- Bekker, Anton E. (2005). Eben Donges Balansstaat (PDF). Sun Press. ISBN 978-1-919980-68-3. Archived from the original (PDF) on 4 March 2016.
