= Second cabinet of D. F. Malan =

Second Malan Cabinet
- 11th Cabinet of the Union of South Africa (since the 1909 South Africa Act)
- 1953–1958
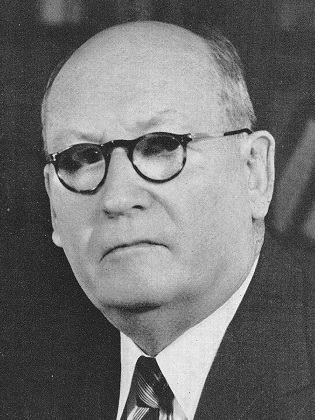
- Daniël Malan
- Date formed: 15 April 1953
- Date dissolved: 16 April 1958 (5 years and 1 day)

People and organisations
- Monarch: Queen Elizabeth II
- Governor-General: Ernest Jansen
- Prime Minister: Daniël Malan (retired 1954); Johannes Strydom
- Member parties: National Party
- Status in legislature: Majority
- Opposition parties: United Party
- Opposition leaders: Jacobus Strauss

History
- Election: 1953 election
- Predecessor: Malan I
- Successor: Strydom

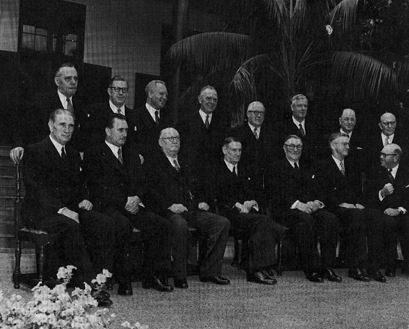
(c.1953) Front (left to right): S. P. le Roux, J. G. Strydom, D. F. Malan, E. G. Jansen, N. C. Havenga, C. R. Swart, and P. O. Sauer. Back (left to right): E. H. Louw, T. E. Donges, F. C. Erasmus, B. J. Schoeman, J. F. Naude, H. Verwoerd, J. H. Viljoen, and K. Bremer.

== Malan's retirement ==
Daniël Malan announced his retirement to a "dumbfounded" cabinet on 12 October 1954. It was thought to be linked to his health. The party favourite, Eric Louw, was suggested by Die Burger to take over. But in the ensuing months, a race broke out between Nicolaas Havenga and Johannes Strydom – who wanted to accelerate the "nationalist objectives."

On 30 November 1954, Johannes Strydom was announced as Daniël Malan's successor.

== Cabinet ==
Post	Minister	Term		Party
Prime Minister	Johannes Strydom	1954	–	NP
Prime Minister	Dr. Daniël Malan	1948	1954	NP
Deputy Prime Minister	Adv. Charles Swart	1954	1958	NP
Deputy Prime Minister	N. C. Havenga	1948	1954	NP
Minister of Agriculture	The Hon. S. P. le Roux MP	1948	1958	NP
Minister of Defence	The Hon. F. C. Erasmus MP	1948	–	NP
Minister of Economic Affairs	The Hon. E. H. Louw MP	1948	1954	NP
Minister of Education, Arts and Science	The Hon. J. H. Viljoen MP	1950	1957	NP
Minister of Finance	The Hon. Tom Naudé MP	1956	1958	NP
Minister of Finance	The Hon. E. H. Louw MP	1954	1956	NP
Minister of Finance	The Hon. N. C. Havenga MP	1948	1954	NP
Minister of Foreign Affairs	The Hon. E. H. Louw MP	1955	–	NP
Minister of Foreign Affairs	Johannes Strydom	1954	1955	NP
Minister of Foreign Affairs	Dr. Daniël Malan	1948	1954	NP
Minister of Forestry	The Hon. F. C. Erasmus MP	1956	–	NP
Minister of Forestry	The Hon. J. H. Viljoen MP	1954	1956	NP
Minister of Health	The Hon. J. H. Viljoen MP	1956	1957	NP
Minister of Health	The Hon. Tom Naudé MP	1954	1956	NP
Minister of Health	The Hon. A. J. R. van Rhijn MP	1953	1954	NP
Minister of Interior Affairs	The Hon. Eben Dönges MP	1948	1958	NP
Minister of Justice	The Hon. Charles Swart MP	1948	–	NP
Minister of Labour	The Hon. Jan de Klerk MP	1954	–	NP
Minister of Labour	The Hon. B. J. Schoeman MP	1948	1954	NP
Minister of Lands and Irrigation	The Hon. P. O. Sauer MP	1954	–	NP
Minister of Lands and Irrigation	The Hon. Johannes Strydom MP	1948	1954	NP
Minister of Native Affairs	The Hon. Hendrik Verwoerd MP	1950	–	NP
Minister of Posts and Telegraphs	The Hon. Albert Hertzog MP	1954	–	NP
Minister of Posts and Telegraphs	The Hon. Tom Naudé MP	1950	1954	NP
Minister of Public Works	The Hon. Jan de Klerk MP	1954	1958	NP
Minister of Public Works	The Hon. B. J. Schoeman MP	1950	1954	NP
Minister of Social Welfare	The Hon. J. J. Serfontein MP	1954	–	NP
Minister of Social Welfare	The Hon. J. H. Viljoen MP	1953	1954	NP
Minister of Transport	The Hon. B. J. Schoeman MP	1954	–	NP
Minister of Transport	The Hon. P. O. Sauer MP	1948	1954	NP

== Sources ==
- "List of Persons". Foreign Relations of the United States. XI (Africa and South Asia). 1954.
- "Inventory of the private collection of CR Swart" (PDF). University of Free State Archive. Archived from the original (PDF) on 6 June 2015.
- "Inventory of the private collection of FC Erasmus" (PDF). University of Free State Archive.
- "Inventory of the private collection of EH Louw" (PDF). University of Free State Archive.
- "Inventory of the private collection of JH Viljoen" (PDF). University of Free State Archive.
- "Inventory of the private collection of J de Klerk" (PDF). University of Free State Archive. Archived from the original (PDF) on 4 March 2016.
- "Inventory of the private collection of BJ Schoeman" (PDF). University of Free State Archive.
- "Inventory of the private collection of JJ Serfontein" (PDF). University of Free State Archive. Archived from the original (PDF) on 4 March 2016.
- "Inventory of the private collection of H Verwoerd" (PDF). University of Free State Archive.
- "Rules – SA Gov". Rulers.
- The Commonwealth at the Summit: Communiqués of Commonwealth Heads. Commonwealth Secretariat. 1987. ISBN 9780850923179.
