= Minister of Home Affairs (South Africa) =

Minister in the government of South Africa

South Africa Minister of Home Affairs
- Flag of South Africa

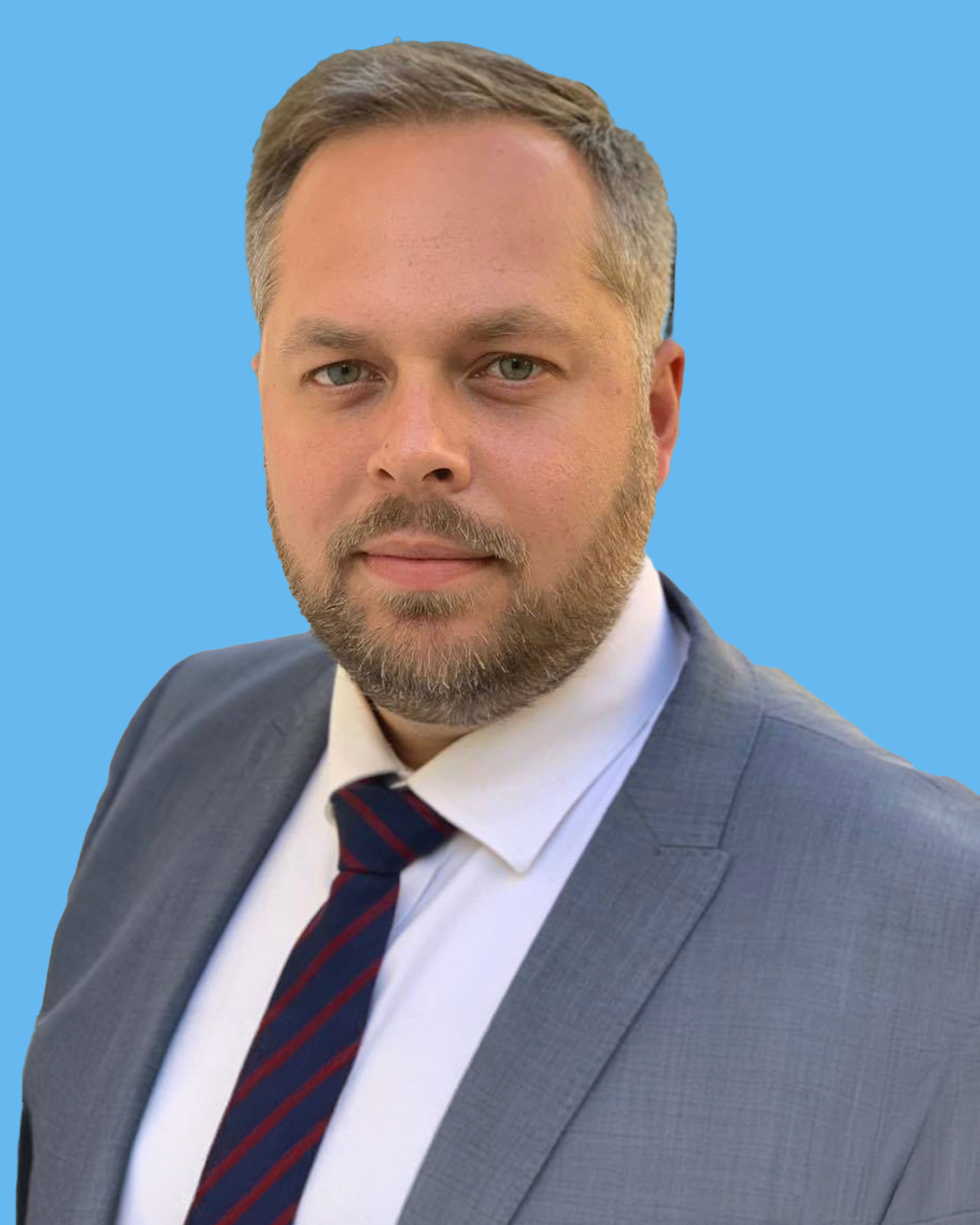
- Incumbent; Leon Schreiber since 30 June 2024
- Department of Home Affairs
- Style: The Honourable
- Appointer: Cyril Ramaphosa
- Inaugural holder: Jan Smuts
- Formation: 31 May 1910
- Deputy: Njabulo Nzuza
- Salary: R2,211,937
- Website: Department of Home Affairs

The minister of home affairs is the minister in the Cabinet of South Africa with responsibility for the Department of Home Affairs. This position is currently filled by Leon Schreiber, who was appointed by President Cyril Ramaphosa on 30 June 2024. The position includes responsibility for immigration, refugee and asylum policy, for the civil registry, and for the issuing of identity documents and passports.

== List of past ministers ==
=== Interior affairs, 1910–1984 ===
Name	Portrait	Term		Party	Prime Minister
Jan Smuts		1910	1912	SAP	Louis Botha (I) (II)
Abraham Fischer		1912	1913	SAP	Louis Botha (I) (II)
Jan Smuts		1913	1919	SAP	Louis Botha (I) (II)
Thomas Watt		1919	1921	SAP	Louis Botha (I) (II)
Thomas Watt		1919	1921	SAP	Jan Smuts (takes office after Botha dies)
Thomas Watt		1919	1921	SAP	Jan Smuts (I) (II)
Patrick Duncan		1921	1924	SAP	Jan Smuts (I) (II)
D.F. Malan		19 June 1924	17 May 1933	NP	J.B.M. Hertzog (I) (II)
J.F.H Hofmeyer		17 May 1933	1936	UP	J.B.M. Hertzog (III) (IV)
Richard Stuttaford		1936	1939	UP	J.B.M. Hertzog (III) (IV)
Harry Lawrence		1939	17 July 1943	UP	J.B.M. Hertzog (III) (IV)
Harry Lawrence		1939	17 July 1943	UP	Jan Smuts (takes office after Hertzog resignation)
C.F. Clarkson		17 July 1943	26 May 1948	UP	Jan Smuts (III)
T.E. Dönges		26 May 1948	16 April 1958	HNP	D.F. Malan (I) (II)
Tom Naudé		16 April 1958	8 October 1961	NP	Strydom (I)
Tom Naudé		16 April 1958	8 October 1961	NP	Hendrik Verwoerd (takes office after Strydom's death)
Jan de Klerk		8 October 1961	30 March 1966	NP	Hendrik Verwoerd (I) (II)
P.K. le Roux		30 March 1966	10 April 1968	NP	Hendrik Verwoerd (I) (II)
Lourens Muller		10 April 1968	1970	NP	
Lourens Muller		10 April 1968	1970	NP	B.J. Vorster (takes office after Verwoerd's death)
Marais Viljoen		1970	1970	NP	B.J. Vorster (I) (II) (III)
Theo Gerdener		1970	1972	NP	B.J. Vorster (I) (II) (III)
Connie Mulder		1972	1978	NP	B.J. Vorster (I) (II) (III)
Alwyn Schlebusch		1978	1980	NP	B.J. Vorster (I) (II) (III)
Jan Christiaan Heunis		1980	1982	NP	B.J. Vorster (I) (II) (III)
Jan Christiaan Heunis		1980	1982	NP	P.W. Botha (I)
F.W. de Klerk		1982	1984	NP	P.W. Botha (I)

=== Internal affairs, 1984–1994 ===
Name	Portrait	Term		Party	President (since 1984)
F.W. de Klerk		1984	1985	NP	P.W. Botha (I) (II)
Stoffel Botha		1985	6 September 1989	NP	P.W. Botha (I) (II)
Gene Louw		6 September 1989	1992	NP	F.W. de Klerk (I)
Louis Pienaar		1992	1993	NP	F.W. de Klerk (I)
Danie Schutte		1993	10 May 1994	NP	F.W. de Klerk (I)

=== Home affairs, 1994–present ===
Name	Portrait	Term	Party	President
Mangosuthu Buthelezi		10 May 1994 – 13 July 2004	IFP	Nelson Mandela (Government of National Unity)
Nosiviwe Mapisa-Nqakula		13 July 2004 – 21 April 2009	ANC	Thabo Mbeki Kgalema Motlanthe (after Mbeki resigned from office)
Nkosazana Dlamini-Zuma		22 April 2009 – 3 October 2012	ANC	Jacob Zuma
Naledi Pandor		4 October 2012 – 6 May 2014	ANC	Jacob Zuma
Malusi Gigaba		7 May 2014 – 30 March 2017	ANC	Jacob Zuma
Hlengiwe Mkhize		30 March 2017 – 17 October 2017	ANC	Jacob Zuma
Ayanda Dlodlo		17 October 2017 – 26 February 2018	ANC	Jacob Zuma
Malusi Gigaba		27 February 2018 - 13 November 2018	ANC	Cyril Ramaphosa
Siyaboga Cwele		22 November 2018 - 29 May 2019	ANC	Cyril Ramaphosa
Aaron Motsoaledi		30 May 2019 – 30 June 2024	ANC	Cyril Ramaphosa
Leon Schreiber		30 June 2024 – Present	DA	Cyril Ramaphosa
