= Minister of Defence and Military Veterans =

Ministerial position in the Cabinet of South Africa

South Africa Minister of Defence and Military Veterans
- Coat of Arms

- Flag of South Africa

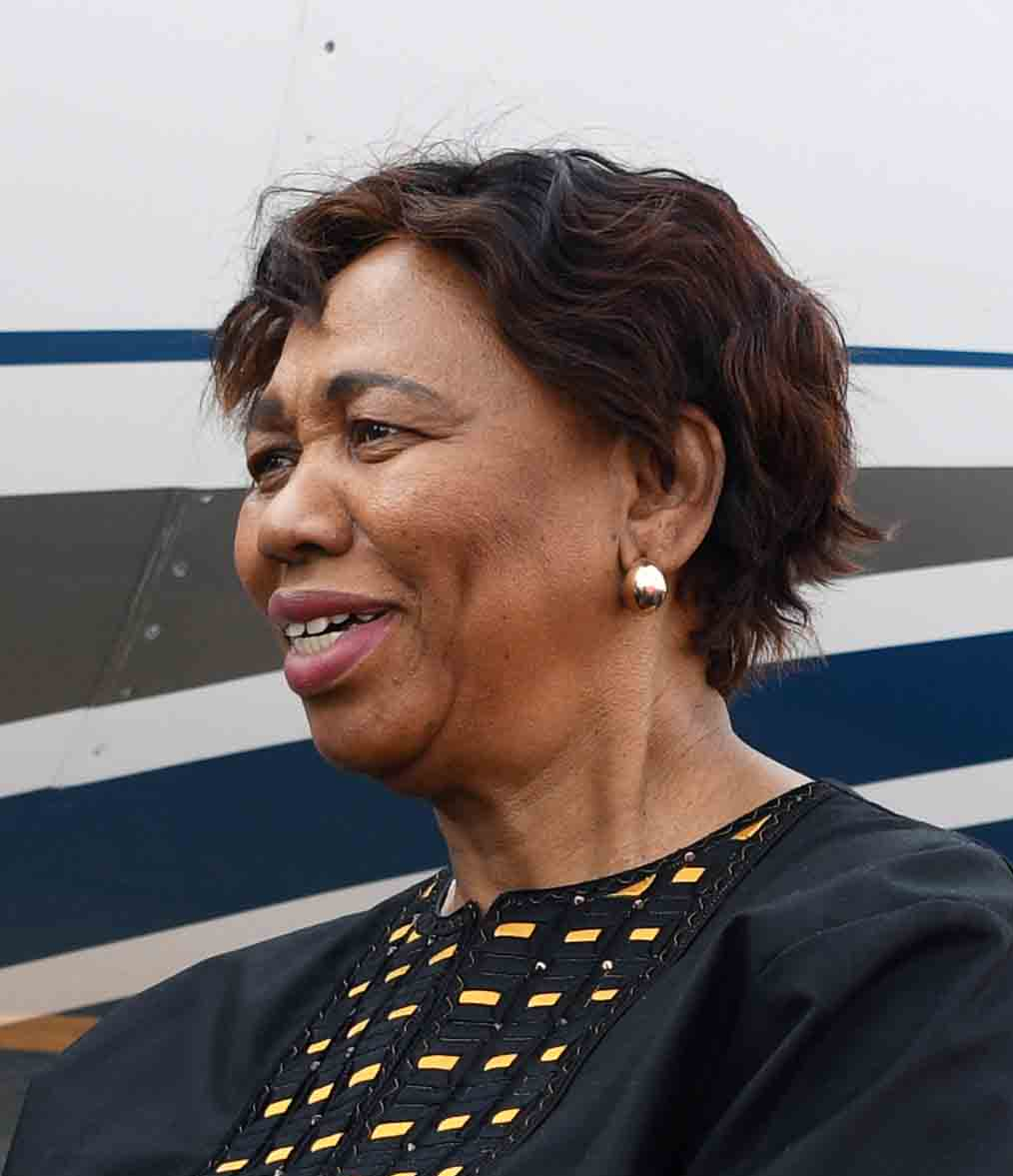
- Incumbent; Angie Motshekga since 30 June 2024
- Department of Defence; Department of Military Veterans
- Style: The Honourable
- Appointer: Cyril Ramaphosa
- Inaugural holder: Lindiwe Sisulu
- Formation: 10 May 2009
- Deputy: Deputy Minister of Defence and Military Veterans
- Salary: R 2,211,937
- Website: Department of Defence; Department of Military Veterans

The minister of defence and military veterans (formerly the minister of defence) is a minister in the Government of South Africa, who is responsible for overseeing the Department of Defence, the Department of Military Veterans and the South African National Defence Force.

== List of ministers ==
Name	Portrait	Term		Party	President (since 1984)
Jan Smuts		15 September 1910	27 August 1919	SAP	Louis Botha (I) (II)
Hendrik Mentz		28 August 1919	19 June 1924	SAP	Louis Botha (I) (II)
Hendrik Mentz		28 August 1919	19 June 1924	SAP	Jan Smuts (takes office after Botha dies)
Hendrik Mentz		28 August 1919	19 June 1924	SAP	Jan Smuts (I) (II)
Frederic Creswell		20 June 1924	17 May 1933	LP	J.B.M. Hertzog (I) (II)
Oswald Pirow		18 May 1933	4 September 1939	NP	J.B.M. Hertzog (I) (II)
Oswald Pirow		18 May 1933	4 September 1939	UP	J.B.M. Hertzog (III) (IV)
Jan Smuts		5 September 1939	26 May 1948	UP	
Jan Smuts		5 September 1939	26 May 1948	UP	Jan Smuts (takes office after Hertzog resignation)
Jan Smuts		5 September 1939	26 May 1948	UP	Jan Smuts (III)
F.C. Erasmus		26 May 1948	12 December 1959	HNP	D.F. Malan (I) (II)
F.C. Erasmus		26 May 1948	12 December 1959	NP	Strydom (I)
J.J. Fouché		12 December 1959	30 March 1966	NP	Strydom (I)
J.J. Fouché		12 December 1959	30 March 1966	NP	Hendrik Verwoerd (takes office after Strydom's death)
J.J. Fouché		12 December 1959	30 March 1966	NP	Hendrik Verwoerd (I) (II)
P.W. Botha		30 March 1966	28 April 1981	NP	Hendrik Verwoerd (I) (II)
P.W. Botha		30 March 1966	28 April 1981	NP	B.J. Vorster (takes office after Verwoerd's death)
P.W. Botha		30 March 1966	28 April 1981	NP	B.J. Vorster (I) (II) (III)
Magnus Malan		29 April 1981	1991	NP	P.W. Botha (I) (II)
Magnus Malan		29 April 1981	1991	NP	F.W. de Klerk (I)
Roelf Meyer		1991	1992	NP	F.W. de Klerk (I)
Gene Louw		1992	1993	NP	F.W. de Klerk (I)
Kobie Coetsee		1993	9 May 1994	NP	F.W. de Klerk (I)
Joe Modise		10 May 1994	25 June 1999	ANC	Nelson Mandela (Government of National Unity)
Mosiuoa Lekota		24 June 1999	19 September 2008	ANC	Thabo Mbeki (I) (II)
Charles Nqakula		20 September 2008	21 April 2009	ANC	Kgalema Motlanthe (takes office after Mbeki resigns)
Lindiwe Sisulu		22 April 2009	12 June 2012	ANC	Jacob Zuma (I) (II)
Nosiviwe Mapisa-Nqakula		12 June 2012	2013	ANC	Jacob Zuma (I) (II)

=== Minister of Defence and Military Veterans, 2013–present ===
Name	Portrait	Term		Party	President
Nosiviwe Mapisa-Nqakula		2013	5 August 2021	ANC	Jacob Zuma (I) (II); Cyril Ramaphosa (I) (II)
Thandi Modise		5 August 2021	19 June 2024	ANC	Cyril Ramaphosa (II shuffled)
Angie Motshekga		30 June 2024	incumbent	ANC	Cyril Ramaphosa (III shuffled)
