= Cabinet of J. G. Strijdom =

Strydom Cabinet
- 12th Cabinet of the Union of South Africa (since the 1909 South Africa Act)
- 1958–1961
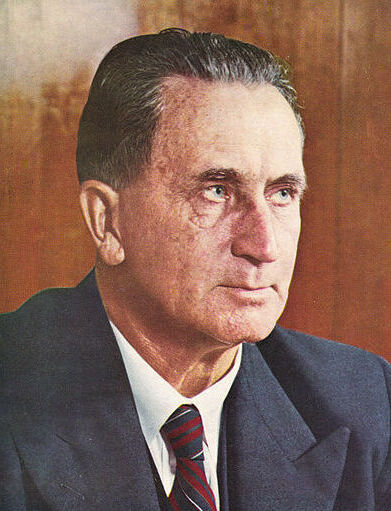
- Hans Strydom (c. 1958)
- Date established: 16 April 1958
- Date dissolved: 8 October 1961 (3 years, 5 months and 22 days)

Leadership and composition
- Monarch: Queen Elizabeth II
- Prime Minister: Johannes Strydom (died 1958); Hendrik Verwoerd
- Member parties: National Party
- Status in legislature: Majority
- Opposition parties: United Party
- Opposition leaders: De Villiers Graaff

Formation and history
- Election: 1958 election
- Predecessor: Malan II
- Successor: Verwoerd I

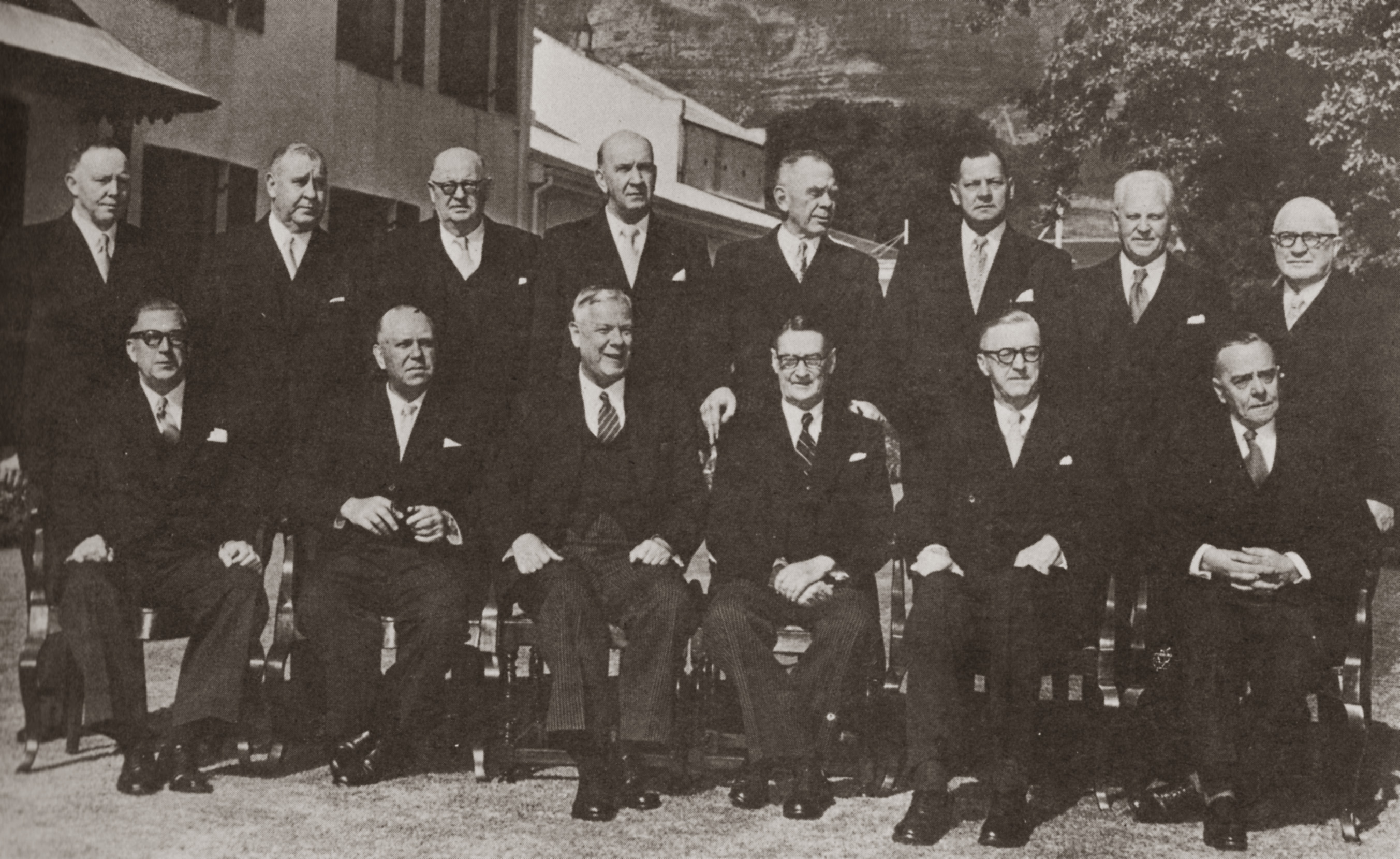
(c.1958) Front (left to right): Eben Dönges, Paul Sauer, Hendrik Verwoerd, E. G. Jansen, C. R. Swart, and Eric Louw. Back (left to right): J. J. Serfontein, M. D. C. de Wet, A. J. R. van Rhijn, Jan de Klerk, Ben Schoeman, P. K. le Roux, F. C. Erasmus, and Tom Naudé.

The cabinet of J. G. Strijdom refers to the ministers who comprised the government of South African apartheid-era prime minister Johannes Gerhardus Strijdom from 1958 until he was succeed as prime minister by Hendrik Verwoerd. Included in the cabinet was Nico Diederichs, future president of South Africa following the severing of ties with the British Monarchy.

== Cabinet ==
Post	Minister	Term		Party
Prime Minister	Hendrik Verwoerd	1958	–	NP
Prime Minister	Johannes Strydom	1958	1958	NP
Deputy Prime Minister	Hendrik Verwoerd	1958	1958	NP
Minister of Defence	The Hon. Jacobus Fouché MP	1959	–	NP
Minister of Defence	The Hon. F. C. Erasmus MP	1948	1959	NP
Minister of Economic Affairs	The Hon. Nicolaas Diederichs MP	1958	–	NP
Minister of Education, Arts and Science	The Hon. J. J. Serfontein MP	1958	1961	NP
Minister of Finance	The Hon. Eben Dönges MP	1958	–	NP
Minister of Foreign Affairs	The Hon. E. H. Louw MP	1955	–	NP
Minister of Forestry (merged with Water Affairs in 1959)	The Hon. F. C. Erasmus MP	1956	1959	NP
Minister of Health	The Hon. Albert Hertzog MP	1958	–	NP
Minister of Interior Affairs	The Hon. Tom Naudé MP	1958	1961	NP
Minister of Justice	The Hon. F. C. Erasmus MP	1959	–	NP
Minister of Justice	The Hon. Charles Swart MP	1948	1959	NP
Minister of Labour	The Hon. Jan de Klerk MP	1954	1961	NP
Minister of Lands and Irrigation	The Hon. P. O. Sauer MP	1954	–	NP
Minister of Posts and Telegraphs	The Hon. Albert Hertzog MP	1954	–	NP
Minister of Public Works	The Hon. P. O. Sauer MP	1958	–	NP
Minister of Social Welfare and Pensions (renamed in 1958)	The Hon. J. J. Serfontein MP	1954	–	NP
Minister of Transport	The Hon. B. J. Schoeman MP	1954	–	NP
Minister of Water Affairs and Agricultural Technical Services	The Hon. P. K. le Roux MP	1958	–	NP

== Sources ==
- "Inventory of the private collection of CR Swart" (PDF). University of Free State Archive. Archived from the original (PDF) on 6 June 2015.
- "Inventory of the private collection of FC Erasmus" (PDF). University of Free State Archive.
- "Inventory of the private collection of EH Louw" (PDF). University of Free State Archive.
- "Inventory of the private collection of JH Viljoen" (PDF). University of Free State Archive.
- "Inventory of the private collection of J de Klerk" (PDF). University of Free State Archive. Archived from the original (PDF) on 4 March 2016.
- "Inventory of the private collection of BJ Schoeman" (PDF). University of Free State Archive.
- "Inventory of the private collection of JJ Serfontein" (PDF). University of Free State Archive. Archived from the original (PDF) on 4 March 2016.
- "Inventory of the private collection of H Verwoerd" (PDF). University of Free State Archive.
- "Rules – SA Gov". Rulers.
