= Betsie Verwoerd =

Wife of Hendrik Frensch Verwoerd

Spouse of the Prime Minister of South Africa
- In role 2 September 1958 – 6 September 1966
- Preceded by: Susan de Klerk
- Succeeded by: Tini Vorster

Personal details
- Born: 17 May 1901 Middelburg, Cape Colony
- Died: 29 February 2000 (aged 98) Orania, Northern Cape, South Africa
- Party: National Party
- Spouse: Hendrik Verwoerd (m. 1927; died 1966)
- Children: 7

Elizabeth "Betsie" Verwoerd (née Schoombee; 17 May 1901 – 29 February 2000) was the spouse of the Prime Minister of South Africa from 2 September 1958 until the assassination of her husband Hendrik Verwoerd on 6 September 1966.

Betsie was of Danish descent and born on 17 May 1901 to Wynand Johannes and Anna Francina Susanna (née Naude) Schoombee in Middelburg in the Cape Colony.

Betsie met her future husband while both were attending Stellenbosch University in the early 1920s. They were married in Hamburg, Germany, where Verwoerd was studying, on 7 January 1927. The couple spent their honeymoon travelling Europe, visiting the United Kingdom and the United States. They returned to the Union of South Africa in 1928. They had five sons (Wilhelm Johannes Verwoerd, born 5 September 1929; Daniel Wynand Verwoerd, 19 November 1933; Hendrik Frans Verwoerd, born 11 August 1940; Christiaan Andries Verwoerd, 10 September 1942; and Wynand Schoombee Verwoerd, 28 June 1947) and two daughters (Anna Verwoerd, born 9 March 1932; and Elsabet Verwoerd, 26 July 1936). Anna Verwoerd married Carel Boshoff, who later founded the Afrikaner settlement of Orania.

Between 1938 and 1941, Betsie Verwoerd served as a kommandant in the Ossewabrandwag, an Afrikaner nationalist organisation that was later opposed to South Africa's entry into World War II. Her husband was never a member, and though he initially welcomed the group, he would go on to criticise its "Nazi tendencies".

Her husband was assassinated on 6 September 1966. Afterwards, she occasionally performed such official duties as opening the Hendrik Verwoerd Dam (later renamed Gariep Dam) in 1972.

In 1992, she moved to Orania, the Afrikaner settlement founded by her son-in-law. She was visited by the first black president of South Africa, Nelson Mandela, at her home in 1995.

Betsie Verwoerd died at her home on 29 February 2000 at the age of 98. Nelson Mandela expressed his sadness at her death, stating he had been impressed with her "pure Afrikaner hospitality" when he visited her in 1995.

After her death, her house in Orania was converted into a museum. A primary school in Randfontein was previously named in her honour; it was later renamed Laerskool Westgold. A street in Goodwood, Cape Town, still retains her name.
