= Humansdorp (House of Assembly of South Africa constituency) =

South African constituency, 1910–1994

- Former constituency for the South African House of Assembly
- Province: Cape of Good Hope
- Electorate: 17,816 (1989)

Former constituency
- Created: 1910
- Abolished: 1994
- Number of members: 1
- Last MHA: (UP)
- Replaced by: Eastern Cape

Humansdorp was a constituency in the Cape Province of South Africa, which existed from 1910 to 1994. It covered a rural area along the Indian Ocean coast, centred on the town of Humansdorp. Throughout its existence it elected one member to the House of Assembly and one to the Cape Provincial Council.

== Franchise notes ==
When the Union of South Africa was formed in 1910, the electoral qualifications in use in each pre-existing colony were kept in place. The Cape Colony had implemented a “colour-blind” franchise known as the Cape Qualified Franchise, which included all adult literate men owning more than £75 worth of property (controversially raised from £25 in 1892), and this initially remained in effect after the colony became the Cape Province. As of 1908, 22,784 out of 152,221 electors in the Cape Colony were “Native or Coloured”. Eligibility to serve in Parliament and the Provincial Council, however, was restricted to whites from 1910 onward.

The first challenge to the Cape Qualified Franchise came with the Women's Enfranchisement Act, 1930 and the Franchise Laws Amendment Act, 1931, which extended the vote to women and removed property qualifications for the white population only – non-white voters remained subject to the earlier restrictions. In 1936, the Representation of Natives Act removed all black voters from the common electoral roll and introduced three “Native Representative Members”, white MPs elected by the black voters of the province and meant to represent their interests in particular. A similar provision was made for Coloured voters with the Separate Representation of Voters Act, 1951, and although this law was challenged by the courts, it went into effect in time for the 1958 general election, which was thus held with all-white voter rolls for the first time in South African history. The all-white franchise would continue until the end of apartheid and the introduction of universal suffrage in 1994.

== History ==
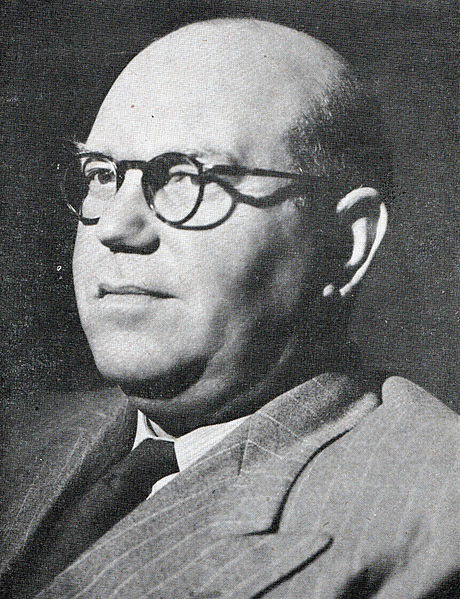
Paul Sauer

Like many constituencies in the rural Cape, the electorate of Humansdorp was largely Afrikaans-speaking and conservative, and with the exception of the inaugural Union election in 1910, the seat was held throughout its existence by the National Party. Its most prominent MP was Paul Sauer, who chaired the Sauer Commission which formulated many of the key policies of apartheid enacted by the post-1948 NP governments. Sauer retired in 1966, but his party colleagues continued to hold the seat by wide margins until the end of apartheid.

== Members ==
Election	Member	Party
1910	J. H. Rademeyer	SAP
1915	Charl W. Malan	National
1920	Charl W. Malan	National
1921	Charl W. Malan	National
1924	Charl W. Malan	National
1929	Charl W. Malan	National
1933	Paul Sauer	National
1934	Paul Sauer	GNP
1938	Paul Sauer	GNP
1943	Paul Sauer	HNP
1948	Paul Sauer	HNP
1953	Paul Sauer	National
1958	Paul Sauer	National
1961	Paul Sauer	National
1966	G. F. Malan	National
1970	G. F. Malan	National
1974	G. F. Malan	National
1977	G. F. Malan	National
1981	W. D. Meyer	National
1987	W. D. Meyer	National
1989	W. D. Meyer	National
1994	constituency abolished	

== Detailed results ==
=== Elections in the 1910s ===
General election 1910: Humansdorp
Party	Candidate	Votes	%	±%
South African	J. M. Rademeyer	1,168	54.3	New
Ind. South African	J. A. L. de Waal	983	45.7	New
Majority		185	8.6	N/A
South African win (new seat)				

General election 1915: Humansdorp
Party	Candidate	Votes	%	±%
National	Charl W. Malan	1,494	53.4	New
South African	J. M. Rademeyer	1,302	46.6	−7.7
Majority		192	6.8	N/A
Turnout		2,796	92.2	N/A
National gain from South African		Swing	N/A	

=== Elections in the 1920s ===
General election 1920: Humansdorp
Party	Candidate	Votes	%	±%
National	Charl W. Malan	1,687	58.9	+5.5
South African	J. M. Rademeyer	1,175	41.1	−5.5
Majority		512	17.8	+11.0
Turnout		2,862	84.3	−7.9
National hold		Swing	+5.5	

General election 1921: Humansdorp
Party	Candidate	Votes	%	±%
National	Charl W. Malan	1,674	59.3	+0.4
South African	J. M. Rademeyer	1,150	40.7	−0.4
Majority		512	18.6	+0.8
Turnout		2,824	62.0	−22.3
National hold		Swing	+0.4	

General election 1924: Humansdorp
Party	Candidate	Votes	%	±%
National	Charl W. Malan	1,824	59.1	−0.2
South African	J. A. L. de Waal	1,241	40.2	−0.5
Rejected ballots		20	0.7	N/A
Majority		583	18.9	+0.3
Turnout		3,085	85.9	+23.9
National hold		Swing	+0.2	

General election 1929: Humansdorp
Party	Candidate	Votes	%	±%
National	Charl W. Malan	1,788	54.1	−5.0
South African	J. P. du Plessis	1,444	43.7	+3.5
Rejected ballots		71	2.2	+1.5
Majority		344	10.4	−8.5
Turnout		3,303	91.0	+5.1
National hold		Swing	-4.3	

=== Elections in the 1930s ===
General election 1933: Humansdorp
Party	Candidate	Votes	%	±%
National	Paul Sauer	Unopposed		
National hold				

General election 1938: Humansdorp
Party	Candidate	Votes	%	±%
Purified National	Paul Oliver Sauer	3,322	56.5	N/A
United	L. A. F. Slabbert	2,539	43.2	New
Rejected ballots		20	0.3	N/A
Majority		783	13.3	N/A
Turnout		5,881	92.9	N/A
Purified National hold		Swing	N/A	
