= First cabinet of Hendrik Verwoerd =

South African Cabinet (1961–1966)

First Verwoerd Cabinet
- 1st Cabinet of the Republic of South Africa (since the 1961 Constitution)
- 1961–1966
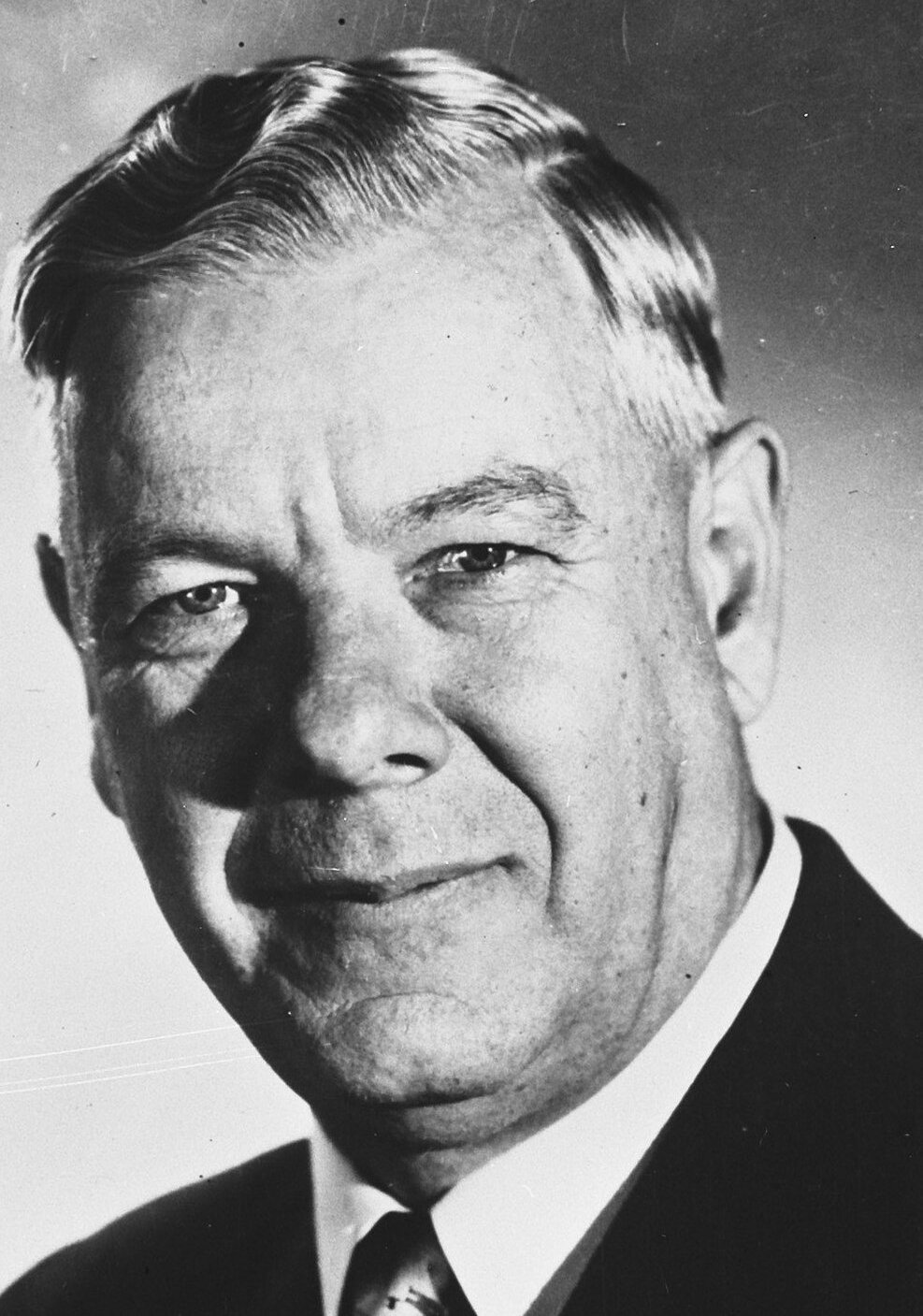
- Hendrik Verwoerd (1960)
- Date formed: 8 October 1961
- Date dissolved: 30 March 1966 (4 years, 5 months and 22 days)

People and organisations
- State President: Charles Swart
- Prime Minister: Hendrik Verwoerd
- Member parties: National Party
- Status in legislature: Majority
- Opposition parties: United Party
- Opposition leaders: De Villiers Graaff

History
- Election: 1961 election
- Predecessor: Strydom
- Successor: Verwoerd II

The first cabinet of Hendrik Verwoerd refers to the ministers who initially comprised the government of South African apartheid-era prime minister Hendrik Verwoerd following that country's severing of remaining of governmental ties with the United Kingdom and associated abolition of the South African Monarchy. Included in the cabinet was Albert Hertzog, future founder of the offshoot re-established National Party, the spiritual successor to the World War II era Reunited National Party founded by his father and associated with former prime-minister D. F. Malan.

Cabinet post	Minister	Start	End
Prime Minister	Hendrik Verwoerd	8 October 1961	30 March 1966
Minister of Agriculture; From 1964: Lands and land affairs	Paul Sauer; D. C. H. Uys	8 October 1961; August 1964	August 1964; 30 March 1966
Minister of Bantu Administration and Development	M. D. C. de Wet Nel	8 October 1961	30 March 1966
Minister of Bantu Education	W. A. Maree	8 October 1961	30 March 1966
Minister of Defense	Jacobus Fouché	8 October 1961	30 March 1966
Minister of Economy	Nicolaas Diederichs	8 October 1961	30 March 1966
Minister of Education, Art and Science	Jan de Klerk	8 October 1961	30 March 1966
Minister of Finance	Eben Dönges	8 October 1961	30 March 1966
Minister of Foreign Affairs	Eric Louw; Hilgard Muller	8 October 1961; 9 January 1964	9 January 1964; 30 March 1966
Minister of Forestry	Paul Sauer; W. A. Maree; Frank Waring	8 October 1961; August 1964; 1965	August 1964; 1965; 30 March 1966
Minister of Health	Albert Hertzog	8 October 1961	30 March 1966
Minister of Housing and Community Development	Pieter Botha	8 October 1961	30 March 1966
Minister of Indian Affairs	W. A. Maree	8 October 1961	30 March 1966
Minister of Information	Frank Waring	8 October 1961	30 March 1966
Minister of Interior (Home Affairs)	Jan de Klerk	8 October 1961	30 March 1966
Minister of Justice	Johannes Vorster	8 October 1961	30 March 1966
Minister of Labour	Alfred Trollip	8 October 1961	30 March 1966
Minister of Mining	Nicolaas Diederichs; Jan Haak	8 October 1961; August 1964	August 1964; 30 March 1966
Minister of Post and Telegraphs	Albert Hertzog	8 October 1961	30 March 1966
Minister of Public Works	Paul Sauer; Pieter Willem Botha	8 October 1961; August 1964	August 1964; 30 March 1966
Minister of Social Security and Pensions	Jan Serfontein	8 October 1961	30 March 1966
Minister of Tourism	Frank Waring	1963	30 March 1966
Minister of Trade and Industry	D. C. H. Uys	8 October 1961	30 March 1966
Minister of Transport	Ben Schoeman	8 October 1961	30 March 1966
Minister of Water and Agricultural Technical Services	P. K. Le Roux	8 October 1961	30 March 1966
