= First cabinet of John Vorster =

First Vorster Cabinet
- 3rd Cabinet of the Republic of South Africa (since the 1961 Constitution)
- 1966–1970
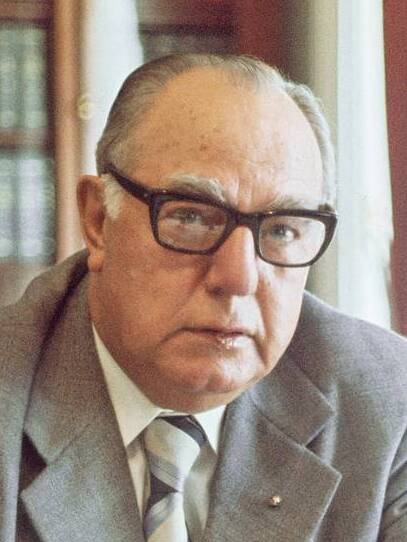
- Johannes Vorster (1978)
- Date formed: 13 September 1966
- Date dissolved: 22 April 1970 (3 years, 7 months and 9 days)

People and organisations
- State President: Charles Swart (until 1967); Tom Naudé (acting, 1967–1968); Jacobus Fouché (from 1968)
- Prime Minister: Johannes Vorster
- Member parties: National Party
- Status in legislature: Majority
- Opposition parties: United Party
- Opposition leaders: De Villiers Graaff

History
- Election: 1966 election
- Predecessor: Verwoerd II
- Successor: Vorster II

Following the assassination of Prime Minister Dr. Hendrik Verwoerd in parliament on 6 September 1966, Adv. Johannes Vorster became the next Prime Minister of South Africa. He appointed members of the National Party to the following positions in his first Cabinet:

== Cabinet ==
Ministry/Portfolio	Minister/Incumbent	Start	End
Prime Minister	Johannes Vorster	13 September 1966	22 April 1970
Minister of Agriculture	Jacobus Fouché; D. C. H. Uys	13 September 1966; 10 April 1968	10 April 1968; 22 April 1970
Minister of Bantu Administration, Bantu; Education and Development	M. C. Botha	13 September 1966	22 April 1970
Minister of Defense	Pieter Botha	13 September 1966	22 April 1970
Minister of Economic Development	Nicolaas Diederichs; Jan Haak	13 September 1966; 1967	1967; 22 April 1970
Minister of Education, Art and Science	Jan de Klerk	29 April 1974	August 1978
Minister of Finance	Eben Dönges; Nicolaas Diederichs	13 September 1966; 24 February 1967	24 February 1967; 22 April 1970
Minister of Foreign Affairs	Hilgard Muller	13 September 1966	22 April 1970
Minister of Forestry	Frank Waring; Fanie Botha	13 September 1966; 9 August 1968	9 August 1968; 22 April 1970
Minister of Health	Albert Hertzog; Carel de Wet	13 September 1966; 9 August 1968	9 August 1968; 22 April 1970
Minister of Home Affairs	P. K. Le Roux; Lourens Muller	13 September 1966; 1968	1968; 22 April 1970
Minister of Immigration	Alfred Trollip; Connie Mulder	13 September 1966; 1968	1968; 22 April 1970
Minister of Indian Affairs	Alfred Trollip; Frank Waring	13 September 1966; 9 August 1968	9 August 1968; 22 April 1970
Minister of Information	Jan de Klerk; Connie Mulder	13 September 1966; 1967	1968; 22 April 1970
Minister of Justice and Prisons	Johannes Vorster; Petrus Cornelius Pelser	13 September 1966	22 April 1970
Minister of Labour	Marais Viljoen	13 September 1966	22 April 1970
Minister of Land and Land Administration	D. C. H. Uys	13 September 1966	22 April 1970
Minister of Mining	Jan Haak; Carel de Wet	13 September 1966; 9 August 1968	9 August 1968; 22 April 1970
Minister of Police	Johannes Vorster	13 September 1966	22 April 1970
Minister of Posts, Telegraphs and Telecommunication	Albert Hertzog; Matthys van Rensburg	13 September 1966; 9 August 1968	9 August 1968; 22 April 1970
Minister of Public Works and Community Development	W. A. Maree; Blaar Coetzee	13 September 1966; 9 August 1968	9 August 1968; 22 April 1970
Minister of Social Affairs and Pensions	W. A. Maree; Connie Mulder	13 September 1966; 9 August 1968	9 August 1968; 22 April 1970
Minister of Sport	Frank Waring	13 September 1966	22 April 1970
Minister of Tourism	Frank Waring	13 September 1966	22 April 1970
Minister of Transport	Ben Schoeman	13 September 1966	22 April 1970
Minister of Water Affairs	Jacobus Fouché; D. C. H. Uys; Fanie Botha	13 September 1966; 9 August 1968	9 August 1968; 22 April 1970
