= Second cabinet of Hendrik Verwoerd =

Second Verwoerd Cabinet
- 2nd Cabinet of the Republic of South Africa (since the 1961 Constitution)
- 1966
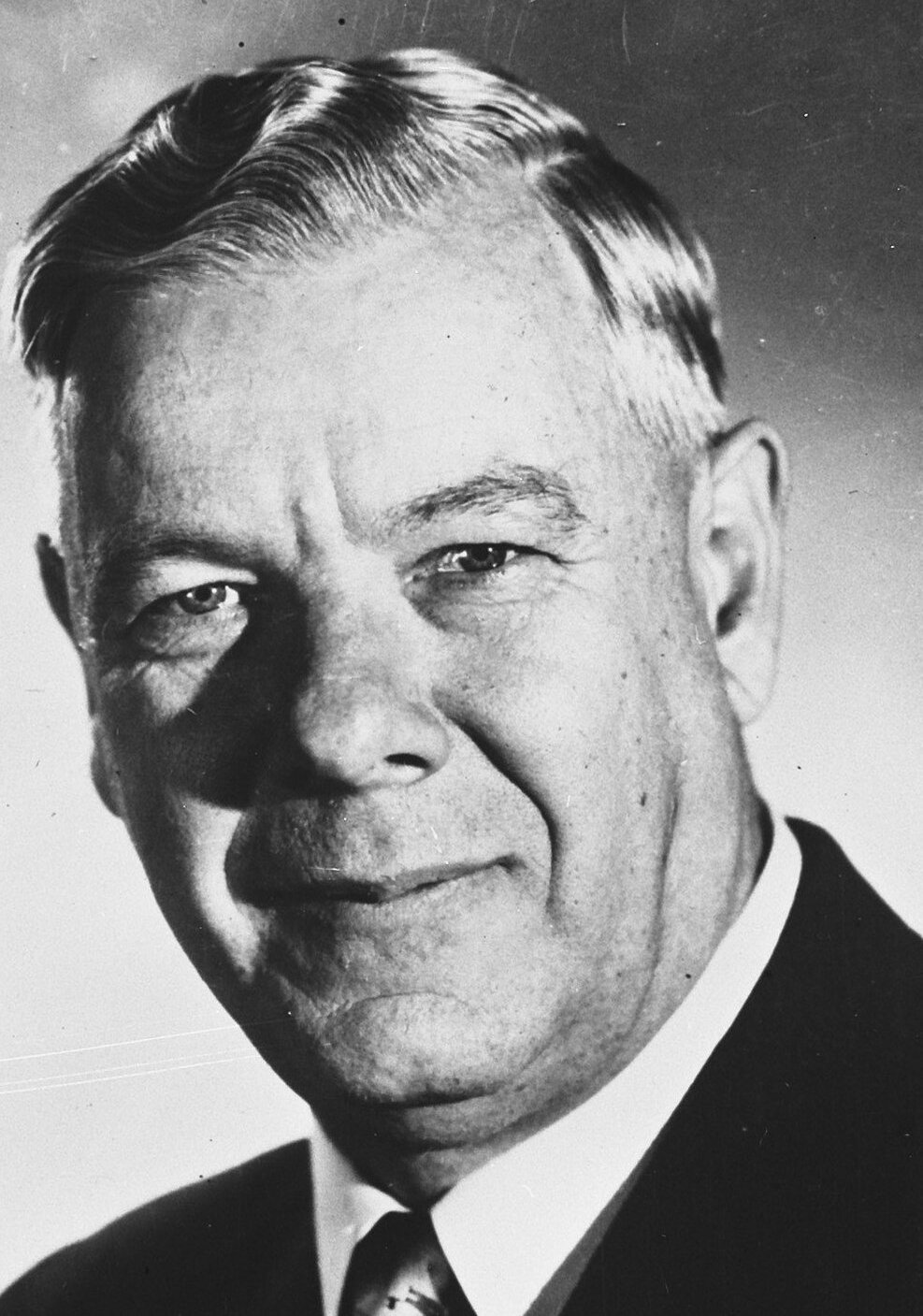
- Hendrik Verwoerd (1960)
- Date formed: 30 March 1966
- Date dissolved: 6 September 1966 (5 months and 7 days)

People and organisations
- State President: Charles Swart
- Prime Minister: Hendrik Verwoerd
- Member parties: National Party
- Status in legislature: Majority
- Opposition parties: United Party
- Opposition leaders: De Villiers Graaff

History
- Election: 1966 election
- Predecessor: Verwoerd I
- Successor: Vorster I

The second cabinet of Hendrik Verwoerd refers to the ministers who comprised the second government of South African apartheid-era prime minister Hendrik Verwoerd following the dissolution of the first Verwoerd government. Mere months after the second Verwoerd government was inaugurated, Verwoerd was murdered and succeeded as prime minister by John Vorster.

| Cabinet post | Minister | Start | End |
|---|---|---|---|
| Prime Minister | Hendrik Verwoerd | 1 April 1966 | 6 September 1966 |
| Minister of Foreign Affairs | Hilgard Muller | 1 April 1966 | 6 September 1966 |
| Minister of Defense | Pieter Botha | 1 April 1966 | 6 September 1966 |
| Minister of Finance | Eben Dönges | 1 April 1966 | 6 September 1966 |
| Minister of Interior | P. K. Le Roux | 1 April 1966 | 6 September 1966 |
| Minister of Justice; Minister of Police | Johannes Vorster | 1 April 1966 | 6 September 1966 |
| Minister of Transport | Ben Schoeman | 1 April 1966 | 6 September 1966 |
| Minister of Labour; Minister of Minorities | Marais Viljoen | 1 April 1966 | 6 September 1966 |
| Minister of Mining | Jan Haak | 1 April 1966 | 6 September 1966 |
| Minister of Economy | Nicolaas Diederichs | 1 April 1966 | 6 September 1966 |
| Minister of Bantu Administration and Development; Minister of Bantu Education | M. C. Botha | 1 April 1966 | 6 September 1966 |
| Minister of Public Works; Minister of Social Security and Pensions | W. A. Maree | 1 April 1966 | 6 September 1966 |
| Minister of Education, Arts and Science; Minister of Information | Jan de Klerk | 1. April 1966 | 6. September 1966 |
| Minister of Forestry, Tourism and Sport | Frank Waring | 1 April 1966 | 6 September 1966 |
| Minister of Agricultural Credit and Land Administration | D. C. H. Uys | 1 April 1966 | 6 September 1966 |
| Minister of Water and Agricultural Technical Services | Jacobus Fouché | 1 April 1966 | 6 September 1966 |
| Minister of Post and Telegraphy; Minister of Health | Albert Hertzog | 1 April 1966 | 6 September 1966 |
| Minister of Immigration; Minister of Indian Affairs | Alfred Trollip | 1 April 1966 | 6 September 1966 |
