= Prime Minister of South Africa =

Head of government (1910–1984)

- Eerste Minister van Suid-Afrika (Afrikaans)
- Coat of Arms of South Africa

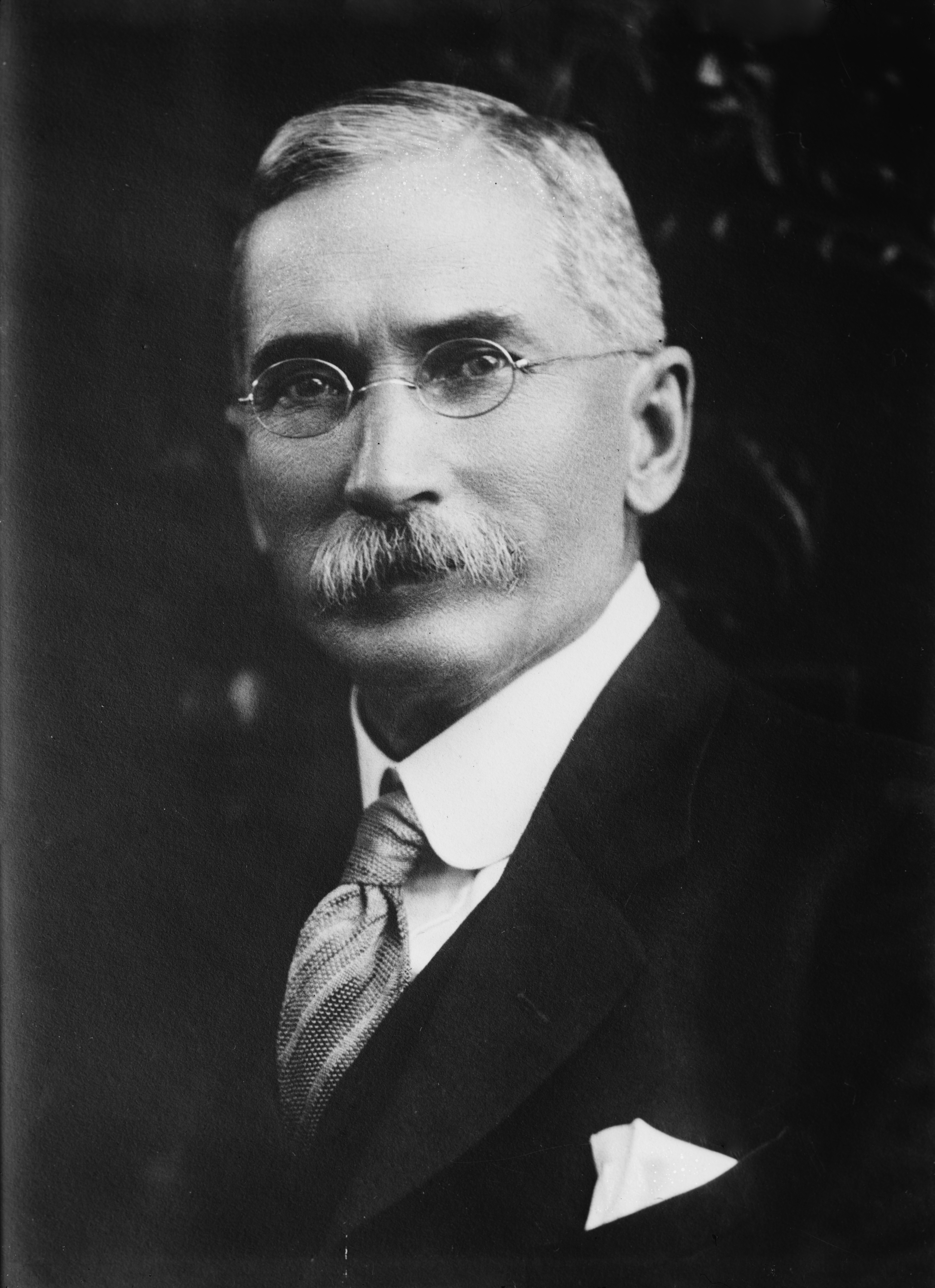
- Longest serving: J. B. M. Hertzog; 30 June 1924 – 5 September 1939
- Style: The Right Honourable (until 1961)
- Type: Head of government
- Member of: Cabinet; House of Assembly
- Appointer: Governor-General of South Africa (1910–1961) State President of South Africa (1961–1984)
- Term length: Whilst commanding the confidence of the House of Assembly
- Formation: 31 May 1910; 116 years ago
- First holder: Louis Botha
- Final holder: P. W. Botha
- Abolished: 14 September 1984; 42 years ago
- Superseded by: Executive State President of South Africa

The prime minister of South Africa (Afrikaans: Eerste Minister van Suid-Afrika) was the head of government in South Africa between 1910 and 1984.

== History of the office ==
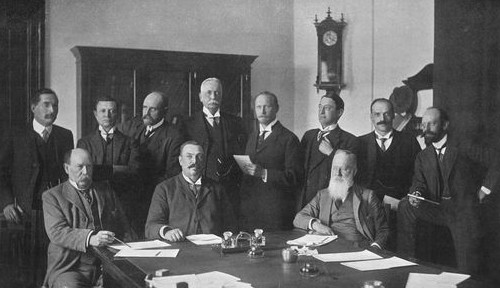
The first Prime Minister of South Africa, Louis Botha (sitting at the centre of the desk), with his 1st Cabinet, 1910.

The position of Prime Minister was established in 1910, when the Union of South Africa was formed. He was appointed by the monarch’s representative in the country—the governor-general until 1961 and the state president after South Africa became a republic in 1961. In practice, he was the leader of the majority party or coalition in the House of Assembly. With few exceptions, the governor-general/state president was bound by convention to act on the prime minister's advice. Thus, the prime minister was the country's leading political figure and de facto chief executive, with powers similar to those of his British counterpart.

The first prime minister was Louis Botha, a former Boer general and war hero during the Second Boer War.

The position of Prime Minister was abolished in 1984, when the State President was given executive powers after a new constitution was adopted – effectively merging the role of Prime Minister and State President. The last Prime Minister of South Africa, P. W. Botha, became the first executive State President after the constitutional reform in 1984 after Marais Viljoen's retirement.

In post-apartheid South Africa, the Inkatha Freedom Party has called for a return to a Westminster-style split executive with a Prime Minister as head of government, which is part of its overarching goal of avoiding a single-party South African state.

== List of prime ministers of South Africa ==
Parties

South African Party
United Party
National Party

No.	Portrait	Name (Birth–Death) Constituency	Term of office			Elected (Parliament)	Political party	Government
No.	Portrait	Name (Birth–Death) Constituency	Took office	Left office	Time in office	Elected (Parliament)	Political party	Government
1		Louis Botha (1862–1919); MP for Standerton, Transvaal Province (until 1915); MP for Losberg, Transvaal Province (from 1915)	31 May 1910	27 August 1919	9 years, 88 days	1910 (1st); 1915 (2nd)	South African Party	L. Botha I–II
1		Louis Botha (1862–1919); MP for Standerton, Transvaal Province (until 1915); MP for Losberg, Transvaal Province (from 1915)	First South African Prime Minister. Formation of the Union of South Africa. World War I. Conquest of the German South West Africa. Crushed the Maritz rebellion. Ratified the Treaty of Versailles. Died in office.					
2		Jan Smuts (1870–1950); MP for Pretoria West, Transvaal Province	3 September 1919	30 June 1924	4 years, 301 days	— (2nd); 1920 (3rd); 1921 (4th)	South African Party	Smuts I–II
2		Jan Smuts (1870–1950); MP for Pretoria West, Transvaal Province	Attended 1921 Imperial Conference. Attempted to broker an armistice and peace deal between the British and Irish nationalists in the Irish War of Independence. Crushed the Rand Rebellion, which caused a political backlash and he lost 1924 general election to National Party. Created coalition with National Party and returned as Deputy Prime Minister and Minister of Justice after the 1933 general election.					
		J. B. M. Hertzog (1866–1942); MP for Smithfield, Orange Free State Province	30 June 1924	5 September 1939	15 years, 67 days	1924 (5th); 1929 (6th); 1933 (7th); 1938 (8th)	National Party (until 1934); United Party (from 1934)	Hertzog I–II–III–IV
3		J. B. M. Hertzog (1866–1942); MP for Smithfield, Orange Free State Province	30 June 1924	5 September 1939	15 years, 67 days	1924 (5th); 1929 (6th); 1933 (7th); 1938 (8th)	National Party (until 1934); United Party (from 1934)	Hertzog I–II–III–IV
3		J. B. M. Hertzog (1866–1942); MP for Smithfield, Orange Free State Province	Replaced Dutch as second official language by Afrikaans in 1925. Instated a new national flag in 1928. Approved women's suffrage for white women with the Women's Enfranchisement Act, 1930. Adoption of the Statute of Westminster 1931. Removed Black voters from the common voters roll. Created coalition with South African Party to form the United Party. Resigned after the United Party caucus refused to accept his stance of neutrality in World War II.					
(2)		Jan Smuts (1870–1950); MP for Standerton, Transvaal Province	5 September 1939	4 June 1948	8 years, 273 days	— (8th); 1943 (9th)	United Party	Smuts III
(2)		Jan Smuts (1870–1950); MP for Standerton, Transvaal Province	World War II. Ratified the UN Charter. Issued the Fagan Report, which stated that complete racial segregation in South Africa was not practical and that restrictions on African migration into urban areas should be abolished. Lost the 1948 general election to National Party.					
4		D. F. Malan (1874–1959); MP for Piketberg, Cape Province	4 June 1948	30 November 1954	6 years, 179 days	1948 (10th); 1953 (11th)	National Party	Malan I–II
4		D. F. Malan (1874–1959); MP for Piketberg, Cape Province	Came to power on the program of apartheid and began the comprehensive implementation of the segregationist policy.					
5		J. G. Strijdom (1893–1958); MP for Waterberg, Transvaal Province	30 November 1954	24 August 1958	3 years, 267 days	— (11th); 1958 (12th)	National Party	Strydom
5		J. G. Strijdom (1893–1958); MP for Waterberg, Transvaal Province	Tried to cut ties with United Kingdom. Removal of Coloured voters from the common voters roll. Extended 'treason trial' of 156 activists (including Nelson Mandela) involved in the Freedom Charter. Severed diplomatic relations with the Soviet Union. Died in office.					
6		H. F. Verwoerd (1901–1966); MP for Heidelberg, Transvaal Province	2 September 1958	6 September 1966	8 years, 4 days	— (12th); 1961 (13th); 1966 (14th)	National Party	Verwoerd I–II
6		H. F. Verwoerd (1901–1966); MP for Heidelberg, Transvaal Province	Start of the South African Border War. The Wind of Change speech by British PM Harold Macmillan. Proclaimed South Africa a Republic outside the Commonwealth of Nations on 31 May 1961 after the 1960 referendum. Abolished the separate Black voters roll. Launched the bantustan programme. Assassinated.					
7		B. J. Vorster (1915–1983); MP for Nigel, Transvaal Province	13 September 1966	2 October 1978	12 years, 19 days	— (14th); 1970 (15th); 1974 (16th); 1977 (17th)	National Party	Vorster I–II–III
7		B. J. Vorster (1915–1983); MP for Nigel, Transvaal Province	Abolished the Coloured voters roll. South African Border War escalated into a full-scale conflict. He managed policy of détente with African countries, and accepted to let black African diplomats living in white areas. He alienated an extremist faction of his National Party when it accepted the presence of Māori players and spectators during the 1970 New Zealand rugby union tour of South Africa. He unofficially supported, but refused to recognize officially, the neighbouring state of Rhodesia, which was ruled by a white minority government that had unilaterally declared independence from United Kingdom. In 1974, under pressure from US Secretary of State Henry Kissinger he pressured Ian Smith, the Prime Minister of Rhodesia, to accept in principle that white minority rule could not continue indefinitely. Resigned.					
8		P. W. Botha (1916–2006); MP for George, Cape Province	9 October 1978	14 September 1984	5 years, 341 days	— (17th); 1981 (18th); 1984 (19th)	National Party	P. W. Botha
8		P. W. Botha (1916–2006); MP for George, Cape Province	Remained Minister of Defence until 1980. Improved relations with the West. Authorized radical constitutional reform in 1983, including the creation of the Tricameral Parliament, which give a limited political voice to the country's Coloured and Indian population groups. The majority Black population group was still excluded. Began a secret nuclear weapons program in collaboration with Israel, which culminated in the production of six nuclear bombs. Creation of police counter-insurgency unit, Koevoet. Resignation of Vorster as State President in the wake of the Muldergate Scandal. Abolished the position of Prime Minister in 1984 and became executive State President.					

== See also ==
- State President of South Africa
- President of South Africa
- Governor-General of South Africa
