= Charl W. Malan =

South African politician (1883–1933)

Charl Wynand Marais "Charlie" Malan (spelt Charles in some sources; 9 August 1883 – 6 February 1933) was a South African politician. He was Minister of Railways and Harbours from 1924 until his death.

He was a brother of F. S. Malan.
