= Frans Erasmus =

South African politician

François Christiaan Erasmus
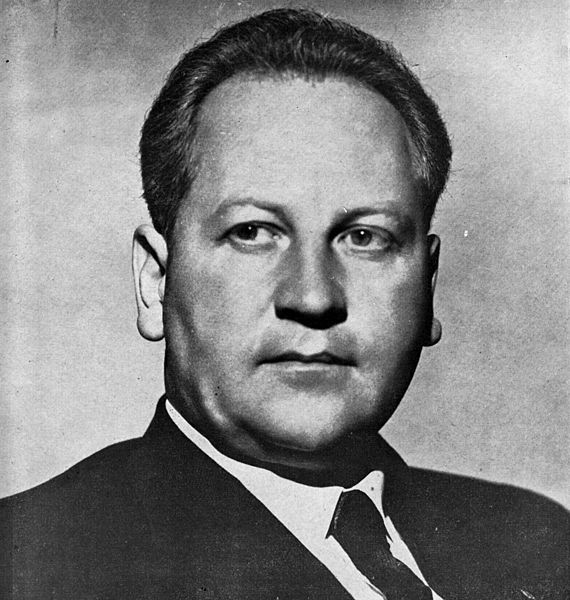

Minister of Justice
- In office 12 December 1959 – 10 August 1961
- Prime Minister: Hendrik Verwoerd
- Preceded by: Charles Robberts Swart
- Succeeded by: B. J. Vorster

Minister of Defence
- In office 4 June 1948 – 12 December 1959
- Prime Minister: D. F. Malan; J. G. Strijdom; Hendrik Verwoerd
- Preceded by: Jan Smuts
- Succeeded by: Jacobus Johannes Fouché

Personal details
- Born: 19 January 1896 Houtenbeck, Merweville District, Cape Colony
- Died: 1 July 1967 (aged 71) De Mond, Bredasdorp District, South Africa
- Party: National
- Spouses: Christina Wiese; Cornelia Margaretha (Corrie) Naudé (m. 1946)

François Christiaan Erasmus (19 January 1896 – 1 July 1967) was a South African National Party politician and Minister of Defence from June 1948 to 1959 as well as Minister of Justice from 1959 to August 1961.

== Early life ==
He was born on 19 January 1896 at Houtenbeck in the Merweville district of the Cape Colony to Marthinus Frederik Erasmus and his wife Hester Maria Jacoba Maritz. He was educated at the University of Cape Town and obtained a Bachelor of Laws degree.

== Career ==
In 1927 he was appointed Deputy Attorney-General of South West Africa. In 1928, he returned to South Africa and became the assistant-secretary of the National Party in the Cape Province. In 1930, he was appointed organising secretary of the same party. Afterwards he entered politics and was elected to Parliament in 1933 as the member for Moorreesburg. He joined D.F. Malan's cabinet as the Minister of Defence in 1948. He modernised the South African Defence Force by establishing the training gymnasiums for officers in the army, navy and air force. He was also involved in the establishment of the South African Military Academy. He negotiated the Simonstown Agreement, the return of the naval base from Royal Navy control.

During World War II, Erasmus became a general in the Ossewabrandwag.

He was widely considered to be incompetent and was very unpopular because of his broad changes to the military to remove what he called the "British Influence". This included the removal of items such as the Red Tabs (Rooi Luise) and the retrenchment or firing of numerous English-speaking officers and the appointment of Afrikaner ones in their place.

He was appointed Minister of Justice in 1959, in the Hendrik Verwoerd cabinet. After his term as Minister of Justice, which ended upon acceptance of his own request for retirement, he was appointed Ambassador to Italy from 1961 until 1965. He retired from public service at that time due to his declining health.

== Marriage ==
Erasmus first married Christina Wiese of Melsetter in the then Southern Rhodesia. They had a son and a daughter. On 9 January 1946 he married Cornelia Margaretha (Corrie) Naudé of Lydenburg. They had three daughters.

== Honours ==
A Strike Craft SAS Frans Erasmus of the South African Navy was named after him.

Political offices
Preceded by Jan Smuts	Minister of Defence (South Africa); 1948–1959	Succeeded by Jacobus Johannes Fouché
Preceded by Charles Robberts Swart	Minister of Justice; 12 December 1959–10 August 1961	Succeeded by B. J. Vorster
