= J. G. Strijdom =

Prime Minister of South Africa from 1954 to 1958

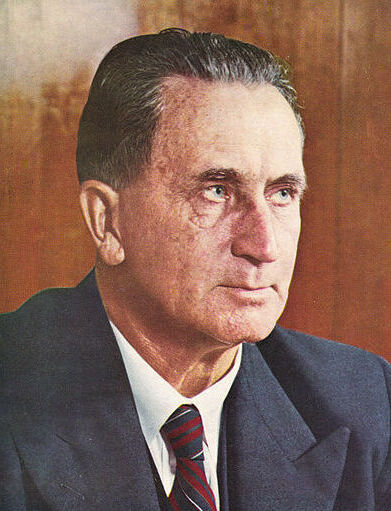
- Strijdom in the 1950s

5th Prime Minister of South Africa
- In office 30 November 1954 – 24 August 1958
- Monarch: Elizabeth II
- Governor-General: Ernest George Jansen
- Preceded by: Daniël Malan
- Succeeded by: Hendrik Verwoerd

President of the National Party
- In office 1953 – 24 August 1958
- Preceded by: Daniël Malan
- Succeeded by: Hendrik Verwoerd

Minister of Lands and Irrigation
- In office 5 June 1948 – 30 November 1954
- Prime Minister: Daniël Malan
- Preceded by: Andrew Conroy
- Succeeded by: Paul Sauer

Member of the House of Assembly for Waterberg
- In office 14 June 1929 – 24 August 1958

Personal details
- Born: Johannes Gerhardus Strijdom; 14 July 1893 Willowmore, Cape Colony
- Died: 24 August 1958 (aged 65) Cape Town, Union of South Africa
- Resting place: Heroes' Acre, Pretoria, South Africa
- Party: National (1918–1935) (1948–58); Purified National (1935–1939); Herenigde Nasionale (1940–1948)
- Spouses: Margaretha van Hulsteyn (m. 1924; div. 1924) Susan de Klerk (m. 1930)
- Children: 3
- Education: Victoria College; University of Pretoria

Johannes Gerhardus "Hans" Strijdom (Note: Also spelled Strydom in accordance with modern Afrikaans language spelling) (14 July 1893 – 24 August 1958), nicknamed the Lion of Waterberg, was a South African politician who served as the fifth prime minister of South Africa from 1954 until his death in 1958.

He was an uncompromising Afrikaner nationalist and a member of the white supremacist baasskap faction of the National Party (NP) who further accentuated the NP's apartheid policies and break with the Union of South Africa in favour of a republic during his rule.

== Early life ==
He was born on the family farm of Klipfontein near Willowmore in the Cape Colony and trained as a lawyer at Victoria College (which later became the University of Stellenbosch) and the University of Pretoria.

His father Petrus Strijdom was a very well-known farmer and innovator in the Baviaanskloof where Strijdom was born. He owned three farms in the kloof of which the main farm was Zandvlakte on which the local school, church and shop was sited. He owned businesses and shops right down to the Gamtoos valley (birthplace of the well-known Khoi woman Saartjie Baartman). He also sold baboon fur and manufactured shoes and soap amongst other products.

Strijdom served in the German South West Africa campaign during World War I, as a member of the South African Medical Corps and, later, of Helgaardt's Scouts, where he reached the rank of corporal.

Strijdom later settled in Nylstroom, Transvaal. He identified strongly with this area and its people and became a local community leader amongst the Afrikaners. In 1929, Strijdom was elected to the House of Assembly as MP for Waterberg, representing the National Party (NP) headed by General J.B.M. Hertzog. Strijdom was also leader of the NP in Transvaal and as such had a strong power base.

After the National Party of J.B.M. Hertzog merged with the South African Party of General Jan Smuts and formed the United Party (UP) during the World Economic Crisis in 1932, Strijdom was part of the break-away faction of the National Party, named the Gesuiwerde Nasionale Party (Purified National Party). Later, after the United Party was formed, the GNP became known as the (Reunited) National Party under the leadership of D. F. Malan. Malan, Strijdom and their followers distrusted Smuts and opposed his pro-British policy. Most of the National Party's MPs stayed with Hertzog, and as Strijdom was loyal to Malan, he was the only MP from Transvaal to support Malan's ideals.

Strijdom favoured the establishment of a republic, allegedly with himself as the first President of South Africa, but due to political controversy this step was not achieved until 1961, after his death, and then only with Governor-General Charles Swart assuming the position of symbolic State President over a Westminster system, as opposed to the executive presidency of the Boer Republics.

== Apartheid era ==
After the surprising victory of the National Party in 1948, won on a programme of implementing apartheid involving strict ethnic segregation and White minority rule, Malan became Prime Minister of South Africa and Strijdom became Minister of Agriculture and Irrigation. Although it was not one of the classic portfolios, it was apparently Strijdom's choice since he had a keen interest in agriculture and was a part-time farmer. Malan gave him the portfolio because his young wife disliked Strijdom. Malan tried his best to ensure the more moderate Nicolaas Havenga succeeded him as prime minister, rather than Strijdom.

=== Prime minister ===
On 30 November 1954, Strijdom was elected leader of the National Party and thus the Prime Minister of South Africa after the resignation of Malan and against the latter's will; Malan had preferred the more moderate Havenga, Minister of Finance, as his successor. However, Strijdom was popular among NP party members and people trusted him to push things smoothly forward towards a republic, something Malan was considered to be only lukewarm about as it would enrage the United Kingdom and jeopardise South Africa's international standing. During Strijdom's term as prime minister, he began moves to sever ties with the British monarchy, and deepened the Afrikaner ascendency in South Africa, while strengthening the policy of apartheid, including through the Group Areas Development Act.

With regard to racial policies, he believed strongly in the perpetuation of White minority and thus Afrikaner rule through the removal of Cape Coloured voters from the common voters roll and put on a separate Coloured voters roll electing separate (White) representatives, which Malan initiated but could not push through, and was only accomplished in 1960, under Strijdom's successor. Strijdom was an open proponent of crude baasskap (white supremacy or white domination). The extended Treason Trial of 156 activists (including Nelson Mandela) involved in the Freedom Charter, happened during Strijdom's term in office. He also managed to further extend the NP's parliamentary seats during the general election in 1958. Strijdom's government also severed diplomatic relations with the Soviet Union. The Suez Crisis gave a geopolitical victory, as closure of the passage through the war-ridden Suez Canal made Western oil transports dependent upon the Cape of Good Hope and thus the goodwill of the South African Navy, making the question of the regime's survival less precarious.

During his last year in office, Strijdom's weak health led to long terms of absence. He died on 24 August 1958 in Cape Town and was succeeded by Hendrik Verwoerd as head of the NP, securing the radical faction's drive towards a complete break with Britain and establishment of the Republic in 1961. Strijdom is interred in the Heroes' Acre, a cemetery in Pretoria.

== Personal life ==
Strijdom was nicknamed "The Lion of the North", because of his aggression and forthrightness.

Strijdom married the actress Margaretha van Hulsteyn in 1924, but they divorced within a year. His second wife was Susan de Klerk, aunt of future president F W de Klerk. They had two children.

== Legacy ==
There are still various monuments dedicated to Strijdom in South Africa. One monument in central Pretoria, which featured his bust, collapsed in 2001 injuring two people. In 2012, the city of Pretoria renamed 27 streets, which included renaming a street named after Strijdom (the M10) to a new name in honor of Solomon Mahlangu. His house in Modimolle (formerly Nylstroom) is now a museum, which holds parts of the collapsed bust.

In Randburg, there was a street named Hans Strijdom Drive that got renamed to Malibongwe Drive in September 2007. In Weltevredenpark, a suburb of Roodepoort, there is a street named JG Strydom Road. Randburg also has a business district called Strijdompark named after him.

The Hillbrow Tower in Johannesburg was officially named the J.G. Strijdom Tower until 1995, when, shortly after the end of apartheid, it was renamed the Telkom Hillbrow Tower. There is also a 133-metre tunnel on the Abel Erasmus Pass section of the R36 road adjacent to the Olifants River that is named the JG Strijdom Tunnel.

In Windhoek, then in South West Africa, the main airport was named J.G. Strijdom Airport following its opening in 1965. Following the country's independence as Namibia in 1990, it was renamed Hosea Kutako International Airport.

== Notes ==
Political offices
Preceded by D. F. Malan	Prime Minister of South Africa; 1954–1958	Succeeded by Hendrik Verwoerd
