= Ben Schoeman =

South African politician (1905–1986)

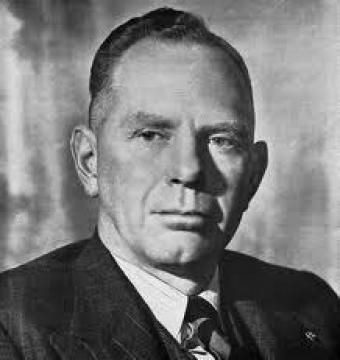

Minister of Transport
- In office 30 November 1954 – 1974
- Preceded by: Paul Sauer
- Succeeded by: Lourens Muller

Minister of Labour
- In office 4 June 1948 – 30 November 1954
- Preceded by: Colin Fraser Steyn
- Succeeded by: Johannes de Klerk

Minister of Public Works
- In office 4 June 1948 – 30 November 1954
- Preceded by: C.F. Clarkson
- Succeeded by: P.O. Sauer

Member of Parliament for Maraisburg
- In office 1948–1974

Member of Parliament for Fordsburg
- In office 1938–1943

Personal details
- Born: 19 January 1905 Braamfontein, Johannesburg, Colony of Transvaal (now Gauteng, South Africa)
- Died: 2 April 1986 (aged 81) South Africa
- Party: National Party (1948–1974); United Party (1938–1943)

Barend Jacobus "Ben" Schoeman (19 January 1905 – 2 April 1986) was a South African politician of the National Party prominent during the apartheid era. He served as the Minister of Labour from 1948 to 1954, and the Minister of Transport from 1954 until 1974.

== History ==
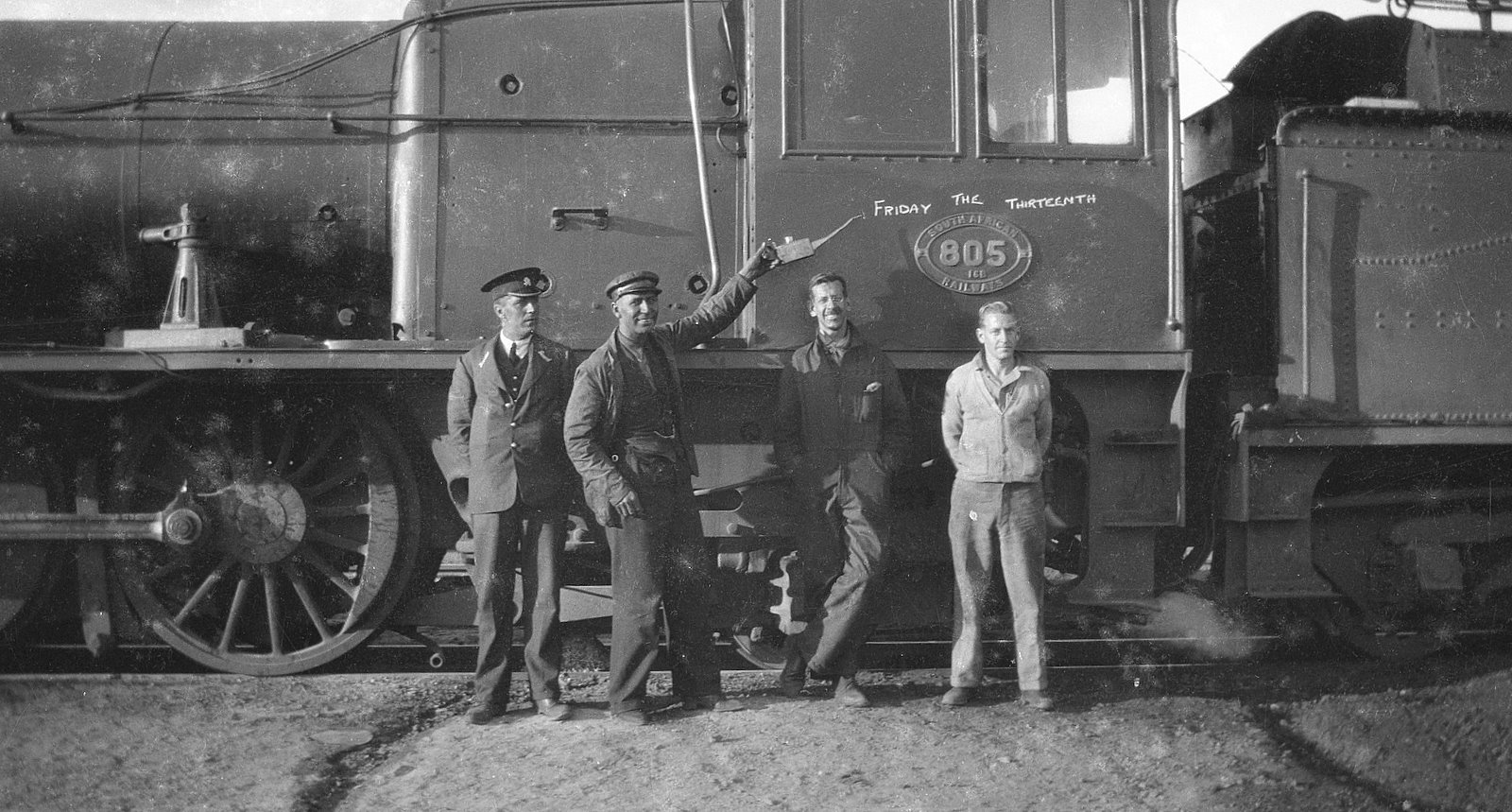
Schoeman in the 1930s, posing in front of a steam train he worked on as a fireman

Schoeman was born in Braamfontein, Johannesburg in the British Colony of the Transvaal on 19 January 1905, the son of train driver Barend Jacobus Schoeman, and Abelina Jacoba Schoeman (née Theunissen). After completing his studies at high school, he joined the railway industry, and worked as both a driver and a fireman. He progressed up the hierarchy, and after 16 years, he achieved the position of station master in Paardekop.

At age seventeen, he was the branch chairman for the National Party in Braamfontein. He entered politics as a member of the United Party, being elected as Member of Parliament for Fordsburg in the 1938 general election, gaining a majority of 1,127 over TC Robertson of the Labour Party. Aged 33, Schoeman was the youngest member of the House of Assembly. At the outbreak of the Second World War, Schoeman supported Prime Minister J. B. M. Hertzog's stance of neutrality. When Hertzog resigned as Prime Minister and switched his allegiance to the National Party, Schoeman similarly switched parties, and in 1940, he became the head of the National Party in the Witwatersrand, and a member of the party's executive committee. In 1943 South African general election, he lost his seat to Sarel Tighy of the United Party. At the 1948 South African general election he returned to Parliament representing Maraisburg for the National Party.

While some have accused Schoeman of being a member of the sometimes militant Afrikaner organisation Ossewabrandwag, Schoeman claims in his memoirs that he was offered the position of general in the organisation but refused. Similarly, Schoeman was approached by the Nazi-sympathizing Oswald Pirow to join his "New Order" organisation which advocated for national-socialism in South Africa. Schoeman declined to support the organisation because of his belief in democracy for the Afrikaner people and ended his relationship with Pirow.

== Leadership election ==
After the assassination in Cape Town of Prime Minister Henrik Verwoerd in September 1966, Schoeman was widely considered to be the favourite to assume leadership of both the National Party and the country. However, the day before the election, he withdrew from the race, granting victory to the only other candidate; John Vorster. In an interview conducted shortly after his withdrawal, Schoeman, who looked as though he had been crying, revealed that he had made the decision due to "gossip, even about my wife." In their 2003 book Unfinished Business: South Africa, Apartheid and Truth, Terry Bell and Dumisa Buhle Ntsebeza suggest that Schoeman was blackmailed by Vorster, though offer no evidence for their theory. African National Congress stalwart Gwede Mantashe has similarly claimed that Schoeman was blackmailed by "securocrats", forcing him to unexpectedly withdraw his candidacy and allowing the more conservative Vorster to take power.

== Legacy ==
Phil Weber, an editor of Die Burger, believed that Schoeman was the "most sober thinker" of D. F. Malan's cabinet regarding the government's stance on apartheid. Notably following the Sharpeville Massacre, Schoeman along with Eben Dönges and Paul Sauer, publicly called for a relaxation of certain Apartheid policies, but this was rejected by Verwoerd.

Various major public infrastructure projects have been named after the long-serving minister including the larger outer dock of the Port of Cape Town, South Africa's busiest highway (the Ben Schoeman Freeway) and previously the East London Airport. Under his ministership Richards Bay Port, Africa's largest coal export facility, was built to expand South Africa's coal exporting capacity.

== Publications ==
- Schoeman, Ben (1973). Jagavonture (in Afrikaans). Doornfontein: Perskor. ISBN 0-628-00338-2. OCLC 3569588.
- Schoeman, Ben (1978). My lewe in die politiek [My life in politics] (in Afrikaans). Johannesburg: Perskor. ISBN 0-628-01466-X. OCLC 5945369.

Assembly seats
Preceded by J. S. F. Pretorius	Member of Parliament for Fordsburg; 1938–1943	Succeeded by D. Burnside
Preceded by ???	Member of Parliament for Maraisburg; 1948–1974	Succeeded by Abraham van Wyk
Political offices
Preceded by Colin Fraser Steyn	Minister of Labour; 1948 – 1954	Succeeded by Johannes de Klerk
Preceded by Paul Sauer	Minister of Transport; 1954 – 1974	Succeeded by Lourens Muller
