= Hendrik Verwoerd =

Prime Minister of South Africa from 1958 to 1966

The Honourable H. F. Verwoerd
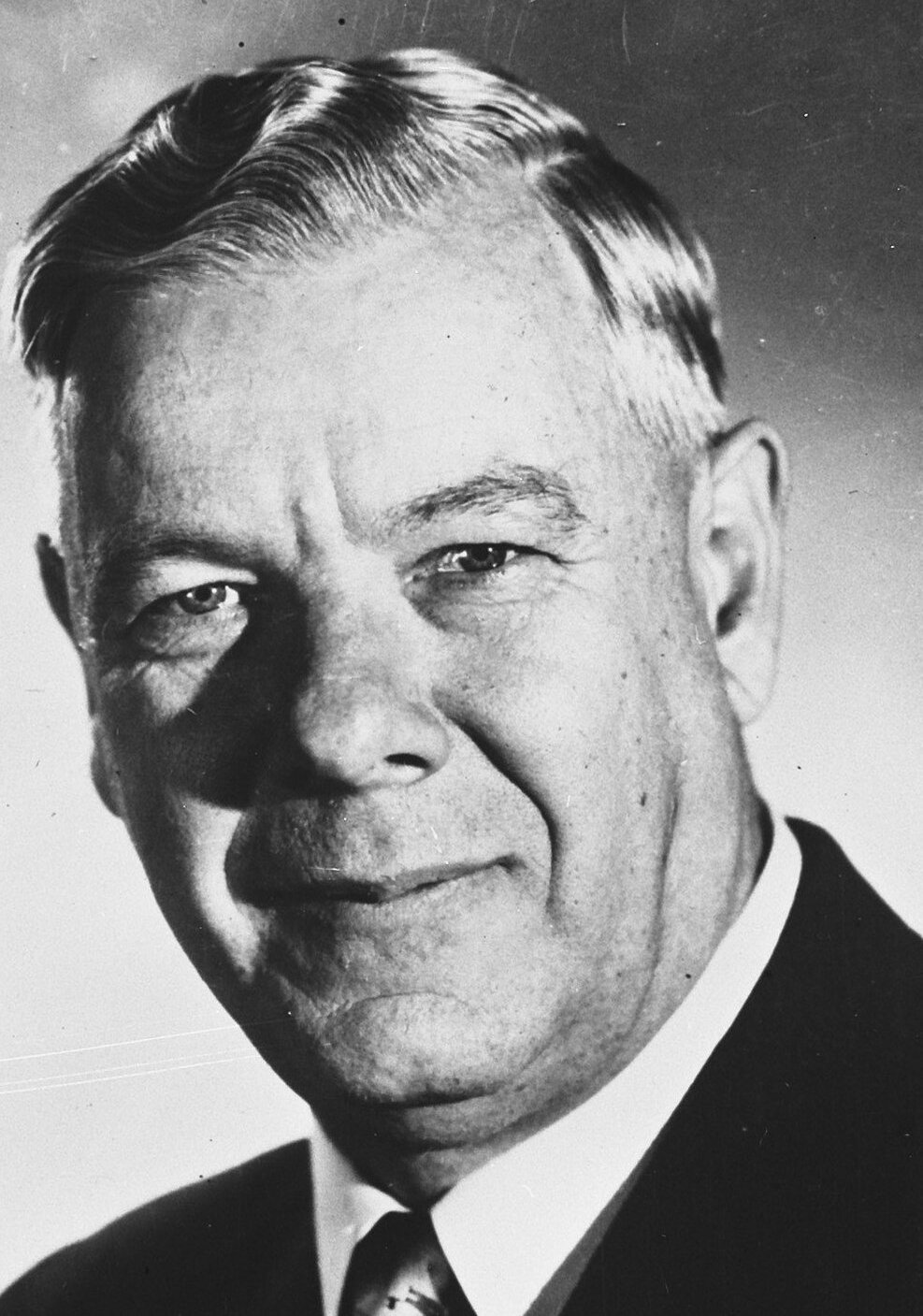
- Verwoerd c. 1958-1966

6th Prime Minister of South Africa
- In office 2 September 1958 – 6 September 1966
- Monarch: Elizabeth II (until 1961) (Note: As the head of state of the Union of South Africa. Replaced by State President Charles Robberts Swart.)
- President: Charles Robberts Swart (from 1961)
- Preceded by: J. G. Strijdom
- Succeeded by: B. J. Vorster

President of the National Party
- In office 24 August 1958 – 6 September 1966
- Preceded by: Johannes Strijdom
- Succeeded by: B. J. Vorster

Minister of Native Affairs
- In office 19 October 1950 – 3 September 1958
- Prime Minister: Daniel François Malan; Johannes Strijdom
- Preceded by: Ernest George Jansen
- Succeeded by: Michel D. C. de Wet Nel

Member of the House of Assembly for Heidelberg
- In office 16 April 1958 – 6 September 1966
- Preceded by: S. H. Eyssen
- Succeeded by: W. L. van der Merwe

Personal details
- Born: Hendrik Frensch Verwoerd; 8 September 1901 Amsterdam, North Holland, Netherlands
- Died: 6 September 1966 (aged 64) Cape Town, Cape Province, (Note: Now the Western Cape) South Africa
- Cause of death: Assassination by stabbing
- Resting place: Heroes' Acre, Pretoria
- Party: National
- Spouse: Betsie Schoombee (m. 1927)
- Children: 7
- Education: University of Leipzig; University of Berlin; University of Hamburg; Stellenbosch University (BA, MA, Psy.D.)
- Occupation: Professor; politician; newspaper editor

Academic background
- Thesis: Die Afstomping van die Gemoedsaandoeninge (1924)
- Influences: Köhler; Kruger; Lipmann; Stern

Academic work
- Discipline: Sociology; psychology
- School or tradition: Völkerpsychologie
- Institutions: Stellenbosch University

Hendrik Frensch Verwoerd (Afrikaans: [fərˈvuːrt]; 8 September 1901 – 6 September 1966), also known as H. F. Verwoerd, was a Dutch-born South African politician, academic, and newspaper editor who served as Prime Minister of South Africa from 1958 until his assassination in 1966.

He is commonly regarded as the architect of apartheid and nicknamed the "father of apartheid". Verwoerd played a significant role in socially engineering apartheid—the country's system of institutionalized racial segregation and white supremacy—and implementing its policies as Minister of Native Affairs (1950–1958) and later as prime minister (1958–1966). Verwoerd was instrumental in helping the National Party come to power in 1948, serving as its political strategist and propagandist, and he became party leader when he was elected prime minister. He was the Union of South Africa's last prime minister; in 1961 he proclaimed the founding of the Republic of South Africa and remained its prime minister until his assassination.

Verwoerd was an authoritarian, socially conservative leader and an Afrikaner nationalist. He was a member of the Afrikaner Broederbond (Afrikaans: Afrikaner Brotherhood), a secret white supremacist and Calvinist organization dedicated to advancing Afrikaner interests. During World War II, he protested against South Africa's declaration of war on Nazi Germany. Following the electoral victory of the Herenigde Nasionale Party (which would later become part of the National Party) in 1948, Verwoerd held senior government positions and wielded strong influence over South African society.

As prime minister, Verwoerd's desire to ensure white, and especially Afrikaner, dominance was a primary reason for his support of a republic. To justify apartheid to international audiences, he claimed it was a policy of "good-neighbourliness", arguing that because different races and cultures have different beliefs and values, they could only reach their full potential by living and developing apart from each other. He stated that the white minority had to be protected from the non-white majority by pursuing a "policy of separate development" and keeping power in the hands of whites. Apartheid resulted in the complete disfranchisement of the non-white population.

During his premiership, Verwoerd heavily repressed opposition to apartheid. He ordered the detention and imprisonment of tens of thousands of people and the exile of thousands more, while greatly empowering, modernizing, and enlarging the security forces of the white apartheid state. He banned black organizations such as the African National Congress and the Pan Africanist Congress; under his leadership, future president Nelson Mandela was imprisoned for life for sabotage. Verwoerd's South Africa had one of the world's highest prison populations and saw a large number of executions and floggings. By the mid-1960s, his government had, to a large degree, suppressed internal civil resistance to apartheid by using extraordinary legislative power, draconian laws, psychological intimidation, and the relentless efforts of the state's security apparatus.

Although apartheid began in 1948 under D. F. Malan, Verwoerd's role in expanding and legally entrenching the system, including his theoretical justifications and opposition to the limited form of integration known as baasskap, have led to his description as the "Architect of Apartheid". His actions prompted the passage of United Nations General Assembly Resolution 1761, which condemned apartheid and ultimately led to South Africa's international isolation and economic sanctions. On 6 September 1966, Verwoerd was stabbed several times by parliamentary messenger Dimitri Tsafendas. He died shortly after, and Tsafendas was jailed until his death in 1999.

== Early life ==
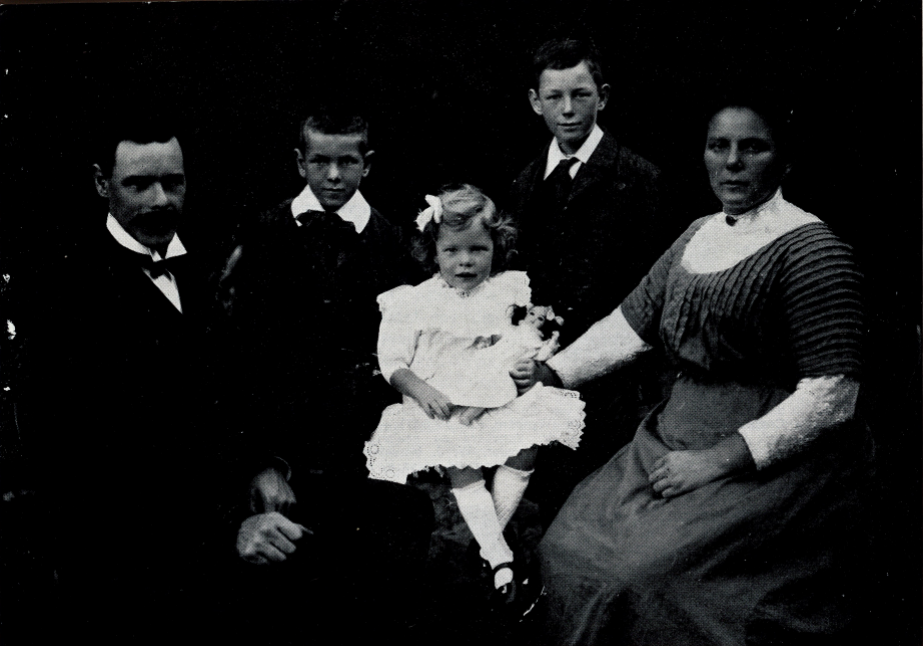
The Verwoerd family in 1908. Left to right: Wilhelmus, Hendrik, Lucie, Len, and Anje.

Hendrik Frensch Verwoerd was born in Amsterdam in the Netherlands on 8 September 1901. He remains South Africa's only foreign-born prime minister. He was the second child of Anje Hendriks Strik (1873–1940) and Wilhelmus Johannes Verwoerd (1874–1961), a grocer and lay evangelist. His siblings were Leendert (1899–1986) and Hendrika Johanna Lucretia "Lucie" (1908–1959), who was the only one born in South Africa. His father, a deeply religious man, moved the family to South Africa in 1903 out of sympathy for the Afrikaner nation following the Second Boer War.

Verwoerd attended a Lutheran primary school in Wynberg, Cape Town. By the end of 1912, the family moved to Bulawayo, Rhodesia, where his father became an assistant evangelist in the Dutch Reformed Church. Verwoerd attended Milton High School, where he won the Alfred Beit Scholarship and achieved the highest marks in English literature in Rhodesia.

In 1917, the family returned to South Africa. Due to the worldwide Spanish flu epidemic that postponed examinations, Verwoerd wrote his matriculation exams in February 1919, placing first in the Orange Free State and fifth in the country.

Verwoerd studied at Stellenbosch University, where he was regarded as a gifted academic with a reputed photographic memory. Fluent in Afrikaans, Dutch, English, and German, he obtained his BA with distinctions, his MA cum laude, and his Doctorate in Psychology cum laude in 1925. His over-300-page doctoral thesis was titled "Die Afstomping van die Gemoedsaandoeninge" (The Blunting of the Emotions).

Verwoerd was offered a prestigious Abe Bailey scholarship to study at the University of Oxford, but declined it in favour of studying in Germany, for which he used a smaller Croll & Gray scholarship. From 1926 to 1927, he studied at the universities of Leipzig under Felix Krueger, Hamburg under William Stern, and Berlin under Wolfgang Köhler and Otto Lipmann. Most of these professors were later barred from teaching by the Nazi regime after 1933. Claims that Verwoerd studied eugenics or was influenced by Nazi ideology are not supported by archival evidence. According to scholar Christoph Marx, Verwoerd "kept conspicuous distance from eugenic doctrines, stressing environmental over hereditary factors." Another historian, Roberta Balstad Miller, found "no archival proof" that his thinking was shaped by Fichtean nationalism.

Verwoerd's fiancée, Betsie Schoombee, joined him in Germany, and they were married in Hamburg on 7 January 1927. He then toured the United States before returning to South Africa. His lecture memoranda from this period stressed that there were "no innate mental difference between major races," and scholars suggest his later segregationist views were influenced more by the American "separate but equal" doctrine than by European ideologies.

== Return to South Africa ==
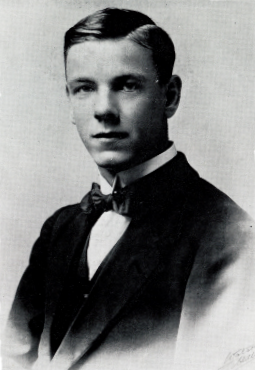
Verwoerd in 1924

Verwoerd returned with his wife to South Africa in 1928 and was appointed to the chair of Applied Psychology and Psycho-Technique at Stellenbosch University, where, six years later, he became Professor of Sociology and Social Work. During the Great Depression, Verwoerd became active in social work among poor white South Africans, chairing the Cape Poor White Relief Committee and serving on six other welfare boards.

From 1910 to 1948, Afrikaans politics were divided between "liberals" such as Jan Smuts, who argued for reconciliation with Britain, and "extremists" who expressed anti-British sentiments due to the Boer War. Both factions believed that South Africa was a "white man's country", though the latter were more stridently committed to white supremacy. Verwoerd belonged to the anti-British faction, which sought to maintain as much distance as possible from Britain.

In 1936, Verwoerd led a deputation of six Stellenbosch professors that petitioned the cabinet to oppose the immigration of German Jews fleeing Nazi persecution, specifically a group of 500 refugees aboard the ship S.S. Stuttgart. His efforts in national welfare drew him into politics, and in 1936 he was offered the first editorship of Die Transvaler. He took up the position in 1937, with the added responsibility of helping to rebuild the National Party in the Transvaal.

Die Transvaler was a publication that supported the aspirations of Afrikaner nationalism, agricultural rights, and labour rights. Combining republicanism, populism, and protectionism, the paper helped "solidify the sentiments of most South Africans, that changes to the socio-economic system were vitally needed." With the start of the Second World War in September 1939, Verwoerd protested against South Africa's role in the conflict when the country declared war on Germany, siding with its former colonial power, the United Kingdom.

In 1943, Verwoerd, as editor of Die Transvaler, sued the English-language newspaper The Star for libel after it accused him of being a Nazi propagandist. In his judgment dismissing the case, Justice Mallin stated that Verwoerd "did support Nazi propaganda, he did make his paper a tool of Nazis in South Africa, and he knew it" (cited by Scheub 2010, 42; Bunting 1964, 106–107). Die Transvaler had headlined every Nazi victory and constantly attacked "British Jewish liberalism."

== Government service ==
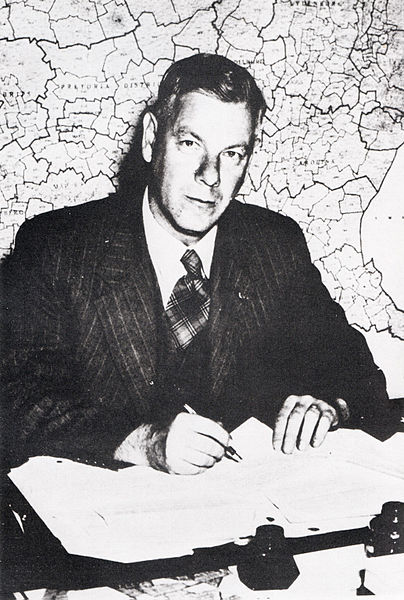
Verwoerd in 1945

The general election of 26 May 1948 saw the National Party, together with the Afrikaner Party, win the election. Malan's Herenigde Nasionale Party (HNP) had concluded an election pact with the Afrikaner Party in 1947. They won with a narrow majority of five seats in Parliament, despite receiving only 40 percent of the voter support. This victory was possible due to the loading of constituencies, which favoured rural areas over cities. The nine Afrikaner Party MPs enabled Malan's HNP to form a coalition government with the Afrikaner Party of Klasie Havenga. The two parties amalgamated in 1951 as the National Party, although Havenga was not comfortable with the NP policy to remove coloured voters from the common voters' roll.

Running on a platform of self-determination and apartheid, Prime Minister Daniel Malan and his party benefited from their support in rural electorates, defeating General Jan Christiaan Smuts and his United Party. Smuts lost his own seat of Standerton. Most party leaders agreed that the nationalist policies were responsible for the National Party's victory. To further cement these policies, HNP leader Daniel Malan called for stricter enforcement of job reservation to protect the white working class and the right of white workers to organise their own labour unions outside of company control.

Verwoerd was elected to the Senate of South Africa later that year. In October 1950, he became the minister of native affairs under Prime Minister Malan, a post he held until his appointment as prime minister in 1958. In that position, he helped to implement the Nationalist Party's programme. According to scholar Ivan Evans, Verwoerd immediately began a "crusading political bureaucracy" that abolished decentralized administration and replaced it with a highly centralized structure within the Department of Native Affairs. Between 1950 and 1953, he drafted thirty-two bills related to Native Affairs, more than had been introduced in the previous two decades. In a 1950 speech, Verwoerd described his policy of "separate development" as a "policy of justice to all… a way to grant survival and full development to each racial group".

Among the laws that were drawn and enacted during Verwoerd's time as minister for native affairs were the Population Registration Act and the Group Areas Act in 1950, the Pass Laws Act of 1952 and the Reservation of Separate Amenities Act of 1953. Verwoerd wrote the Bantu Education Act of 1953 (Act 47 of 1953), which transferred all "native education" to the control of the Minister of Native Affairs, effective from 1 January 1954. In a Senate speech on 7 June 1954, Verwoerd explained his rationale for the law, stating: "There is no place for [the Bantu] in the European community above the level of certain forms of labour…"

The Bantu Education Act ensured that black South Africans had only the barest minimum of education, thus entrenching the role of blacks in the apartheid economy as a cheap source of unskilled labour.

One black South African woman who worked as an anti-apartheid activist, Nomavenda Mathiane, in particular criticized Verwoerd for the Bantu Education Act of 1953, which caused generations of black South Africans to suffer an inferior education, saying: "After white people had taken the land, after white people had impoverished us in South Africa, the only way out of our poverty was through education. And he came up with the idea of giving us an inferior education."

== Prime minister ==
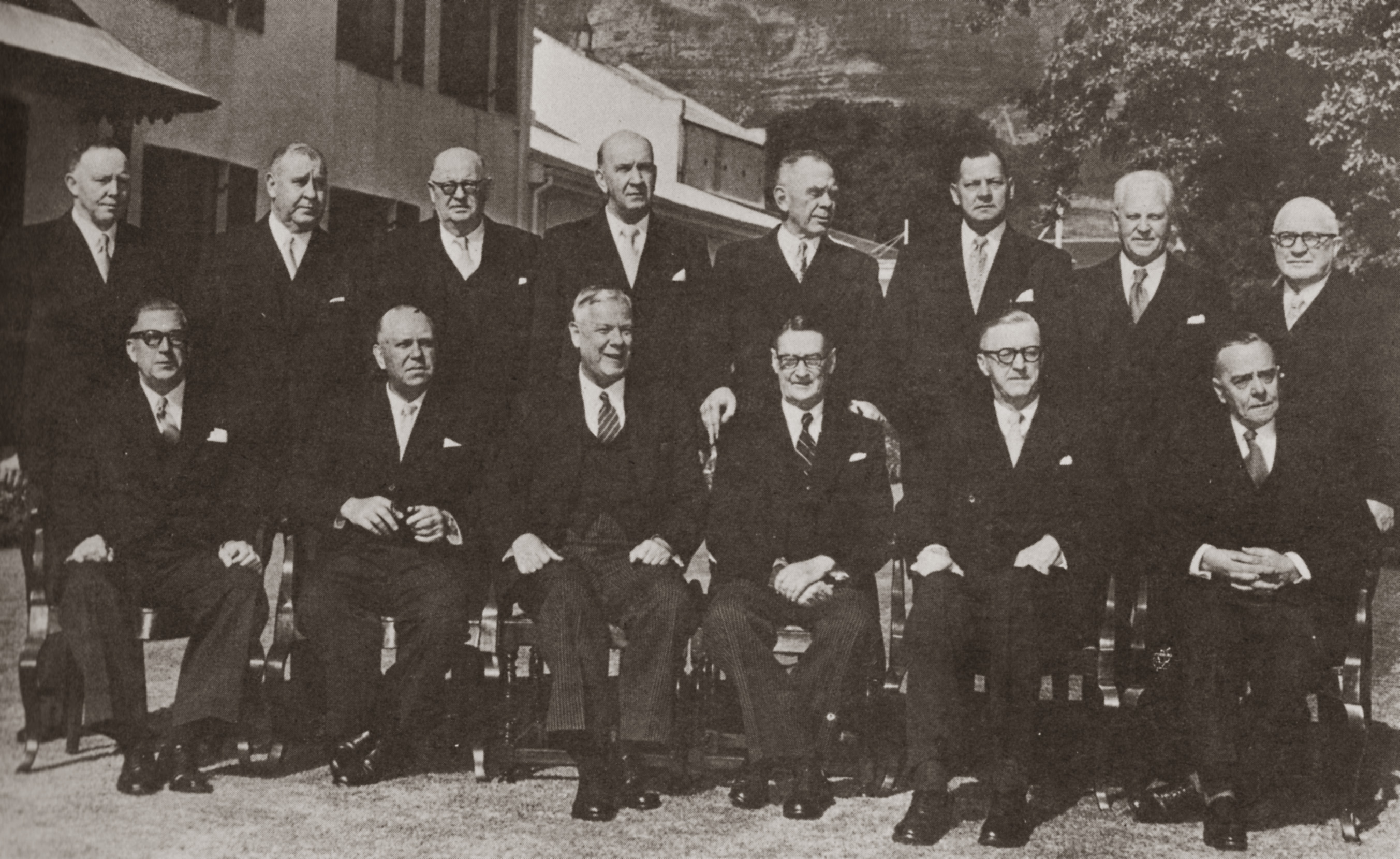
The first Verwoerd cabinet in 1958 Front (L–R): Eben Dönges, Paul Sauer, Verwoerd, E. G. Jansen, C. R. Swart and Eric Louw Back (L–R): J. J. Serfontein, M. D. C. de Wet, A. J. R. van Rhijn, Jan de Klerk, Ben Schoeman, P. K. Le Roux, Frans Erasmus and Tom Naudé

Prime Minister Daniel Malan announced his retirement from politics following the National Party's success in the 1953 general election. In the succession debate that followed Malan's retirement in 1954, N. C. Havenga and J. G. Strijdom were potential successors. The "Young Turks" of the Transvaal gained the upper hand, and J. G. Strijdom was elected as the new leader of the National Party, succeeding Malan as prime minister.

Verwoerd gradually gained popularity with the Afrikaner electorate and continued to expand his political support. The National Party secured 103 of 156 seats, with 55% of the popular vote, in the general election of 16 April 1958. When Prime Minister J. G. Strijdom died on 24 August 1958, Verwoerd was a leading candidate to succeed him. In a tripartite contest against C. R. Swart and Eben Dönges, Verwoerd prevailed in the National Party caucus and was elected leader. He took the oath of office as the sixth prime minister of South Africa on 2 September 1958.

== Apartheid ==
Hendrik Verwoerd is often called the architect of apartheid for his role in shaping the implementation of apartheid policy when he was minister of native affairs and then prime minister. Verwoerd once described apartheid as a "policy of good neighbourliness".

When the NP came to power in 1948, there were factional differences in the party regarding the implementation of systemic racial segregation. The larger baasskap faction favoured segregation but also supported the participation of black Africans in the economy, as long as black labour could be controlled to advance the economic interests of Afrikaners. A second faction consisted of the "purists", who believed in "vertical segregation", under which black and white people would be entirely separated. Black people would live in native reserves with separate political and economic structures, which, they believed, would entail severe short-term pain but would also lead to the independence of white South Africa from black labour in the long term. Verwoerd belonged to a third faction that sympathised with the purists but allowed for the use of black labour while implementing the purist goal of vertical separation.

Verwoerd's vision of a South Africa divided into multiple ethno-states appealed to the reform-minded Afrikaner intelligentsia. It provided a more coherent philosophical and moral framework for the National Party's racist policies, while also giving a veneer of intellectual respectability to the cruder policy of baasskap. Verwoerd felt that the political situation in South Africa had become stagnant over the past century and called for reform.

Under Verwoerd's premiership, the following legislative acts relating to apartheid were introduced:

1. Promotion of Bantu Self-government Act, 1959: Ratified on 19 June 1959, this act provided for the resettlement of Black South Africans into eight ethnic reservations (later expanded to ten) and abolished their parliamentary representation.
2. Bantu Investment Corporation Act, 1959
3. Extension of University Education Act, 1959

== Republic ==
The creation of a republic was one of the National Party's long-term goals since coming to power in 1948. In January 1960, Verwoerd announced that a referendum would be called to determine the republican issue, the objective being a republic within the Commonwealth. Two weeks later, Harold Macmillan, then British prime minister, visited South Africa.

In an address to both Houses of Parliament, Macmillan gave his famous Winds of Change speech. The speech, which implicitly criticized apartheid, together with worldwide criticism following the Sharpeville massacre, created a siege mentality in South Africa. Verwoerd seized upon this to bolster his case for a republic, presenting Elizabeth II as the ruler of a hostile power.

Verwoerd also ensured that South African media gave extensive coverage to the breakdown of society in the Republic of the Congo (Léopoldville) following its independence from Belgium in the summer of 1960, presenting it as an example of the "horrors" that would allegedly ensue in South Africa if apartheid ended. He linked the situation in the Congo to criticism of apartheid in Britain, arguing the Congolese "horrors" were what the British government intended to inflict on white South Africans, thereby fanning the flames of Anglophobia.

The referendum on 5 October 1960 asked white voters, "Are you in favour of a Republic for the Union?". It passed with 52 percent of the vote. In order to bolster support for a republic, the voting age for whites was lowered from 21 to 18, benefiting younger Afrikaans speakers, who were more likely to favour a republic, and the franchise was extended to whites in South-West Africa, most of whom were German or Afrikaans speakers.

In March 1961, at the 1961 Commonwealth Prime Ministers' Conference in London, Verwoerd abandoned an attempt for South Africa to become a republic within the Commonwealth. A resolution jointly sponsored by Jawaharlal Nehru of India and John Diefenbaker of Canada declared that racism was incompatible with Commonwealth membership. After the resolution was accepted, Verwoerd withdrew South Africa's application to remain in the organization "in the interests of honour and dignity," storming out of the conference. For many white South Africans, especially those of British extraction, leaving the Commonwealth imposed a psychological sense of isolation. The Republic of South Africa came into existence on 31 May 1961, the anniversary of the signing of the Treaty of Vereeniging. The last Governor-General, Charles Robberts Swart, took office as the first State President. Verwoerd's new cabinet, announced on 8 October 1961, included B. J. Vorster as Minister of Justice and Nicolaas Diederichs as minister of finance.

After South Africa became a republic, Verwoerd refused to accept black ambassadors from Commonwealth member states. Verwoerd's overt moves to block non-whites from representing South Africa in sports—starting with cricket—triggered the international movement to ostracise South Africa from sporting competition. The 1960 Games were the last Olympics in which the country participated until the abolition of apartheid. South Africa was expelled from FIFA in 1976, and whenever South African teams participated in sports, they were met with protests and disruptions. When supporters of South Africa decried its exclusion, the common response was: "Who started it?", in reference to Verwoerd.

== First assassination attempt ==
A Pathe News clip covering the attempted assassination

On 9 April 1960, Verwoerd opened the Union Exposition in Milner Park, Johannesburg, to mark the jubilee of the Union of South Africa. After Verwoerd delivered his opening address, David Pratt, a wealthy English businessman and farmer from the Magaliesberg, attempted to assassinate him, firing two shots from a .22 pistol at point-blank range. One bullet perforated Verwoerd's right cheek and the second his right ear.

Colonel G. M. Harrison, president of the Witwatersrand Agricultural Society, leapt up and knocked the pistol from the gunman's hand. He was taken to the Marshall Square police station. Within minutes of the attempt, Verwoerd was rushed to the nearby Johannesburg Hospital. The neurologists who treated Verwoerd later stated that his escape had been 'absolutely miraculous'. He returned to public life on 29 May, less than two months after the shooting.

David Pratt was initially held under the emergency regulations, declared on 30 March 1960, nine days after the Sharpeville massacre and shortly after Verwoerd received a death threat. Pratt appeared for a preliminary hearing in the Johannesburg Magistrates' Court on 20 and 21 July 1960. Pratt claimed that he had been shooting 'the epitome of apartheid' but stated in his defence that he had only intended to injure, not kill, Verwoerd. On 26 September 1960, he was committed to a mental hospital in Bloemfontein after the court accepted that he lacked legal capacity. On 1 October 1961, he committed suicide.

== Solidifying the system ==
In 1961, UN Secretary-General Dag Hammarskjöld visited South Africa but could not reach an agreement with Prime Minister Verwoerd. On 6 November 1962, the United Nations General Assembly passed Resolution 1761, condemning South African apartheid policies. On 7 August 1963, the United Nations Security Council passed Resolution 181 calling for a voluntary arms embargo against South Africa, and in the same year, a Special Committee Against Apartheid was established to encourage and oversee plans of action against the authorities.

From 1964, the US and UK discontinued their arms trade with South Africa. Economic sanctions against South Africa were also frequently debated in the UN as an effective way of putting pressure on the apartheid government. In 1962, the UN General Assembly requested that its members sever political, fiscal, and transportation ties with South Africa.

== Assassination ==
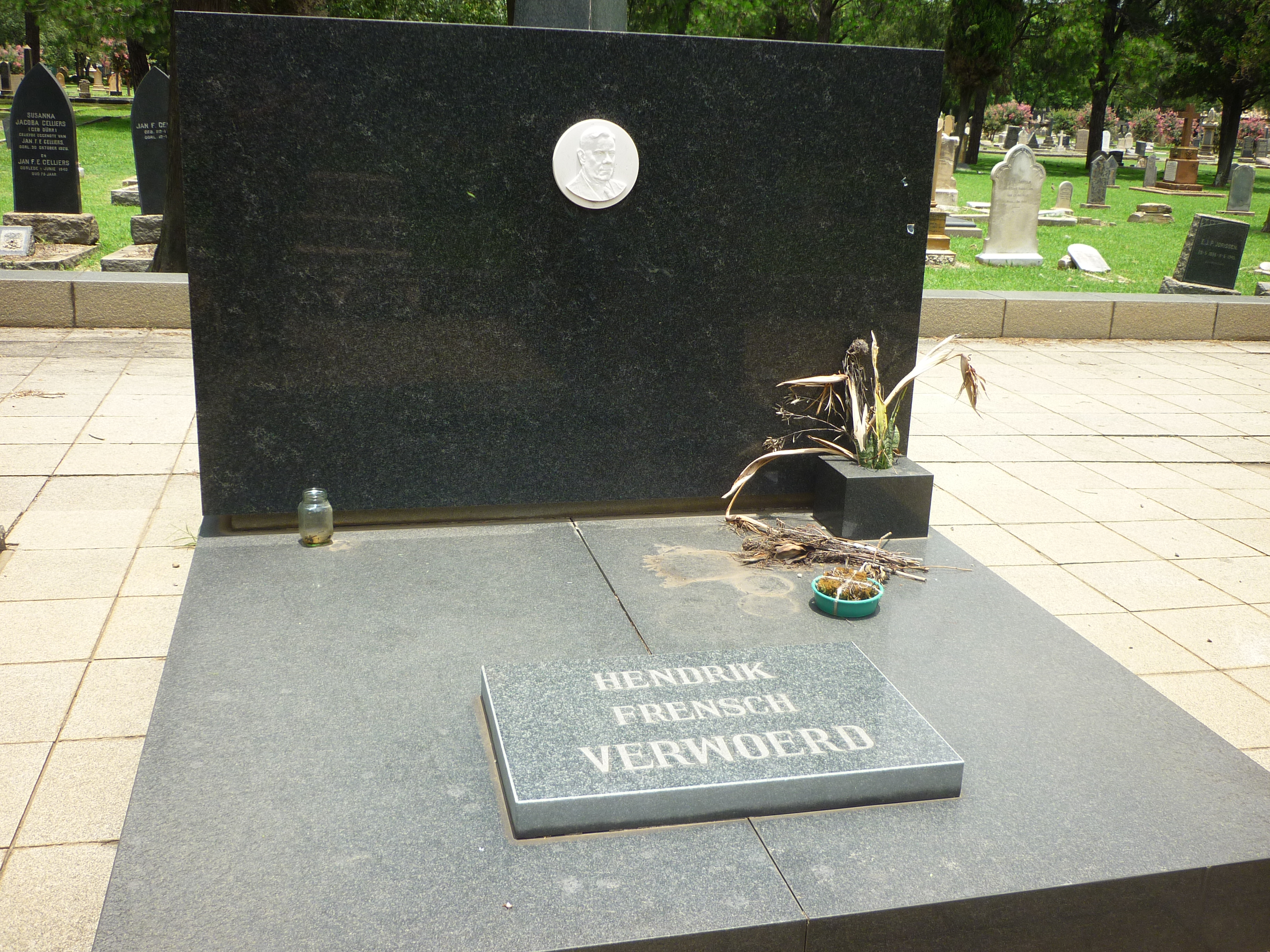
Verwoerd's grave at Heroes' Acre in Pretoria

On 6 September 1966, Verwoerd was stabbed to death in Cape Town, shortly after entering the House of Assembly at 14:15. A uniformed parliamentary messenger named Dimitri Tsafendas stabbed Verwoerd in the neck and chest four times before being subdued by other members of the Assembly.

Four members of Parliament who were also trained doctors rushed to Verwoerd's aid and began administering cardiopulmonary resuscitation. Verwoerd was rushed to Groote Schuur Hospital, but was pronounced dead upon arrival.

=== Funeral ===
Verwoerd's state funeral, attended by a quarter of a million people, was held in Pretoria on 10 September 1966. His South African flag-draped casket was laid on an artillery carriage towed by a military truck. He was buried in the Heroes' Acre in Pretoria. The blood-stained carpet where Verwoerd lay after his murder remained in Parliament until it was removed in 2004.

=== Aftermath ===
Over the days that followed the assassination, Tsafendas was questioned by the police while in custody, while the police investigated every lead. Under questioning, Tsafendas made coherent statements explaining that he had committed his act in the hope that after Verwoerd's "disappearance" "a change of policy would take place." He added, "I wanted to see a government representing all the South African people. I do not think the Nationalist Government is representative of the people and I wanted to see a different government … I did not care about the consequences, for what would happen to me afterwards."

At the same time, the South African police gathered a plethora of evidence of Tsafendas's long history of political activism. Nevertheless, none of these became known during a summary trial where Tsafendas escaped the death penalty on the grounds of insanity. Judge Andries Beyers ordered Tsafendas to be imprisoned indefinitely at the "State President's pleasure"; in 1999 he died aged 81 still in detention. A 2018 scholarly report submitted to the South African Minister of Justice, compiled by Harris Dousemetzis, concluded after a nine-year investigation that Tsafendas acted from a political motive and was not insane, contradicting the findings of the 1966 inquest.

== Legacy ==
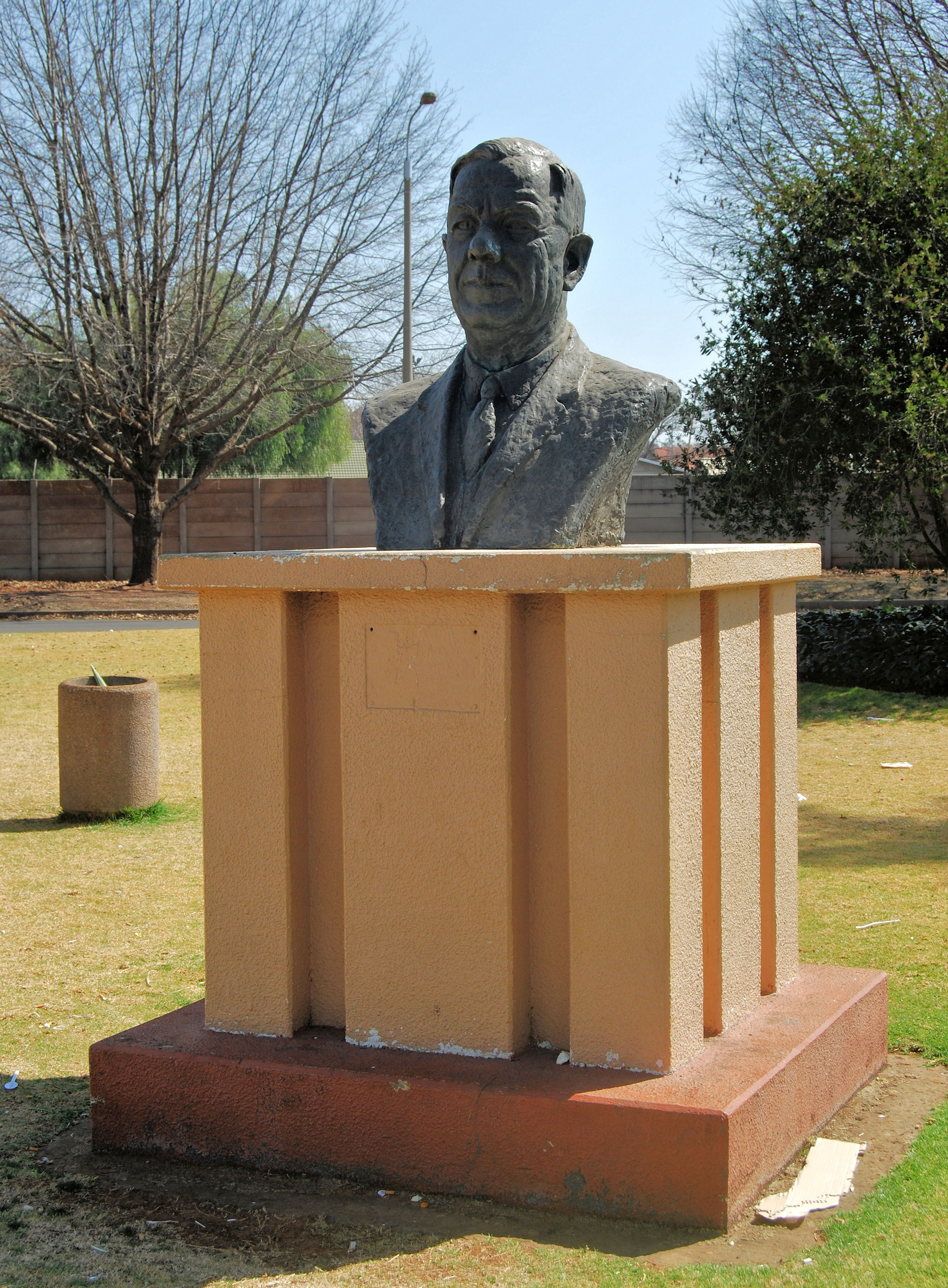
Bust of Hendrik Verwoerd in Meyerton, Gauteng, in 2008. The bust was removed in 2011.

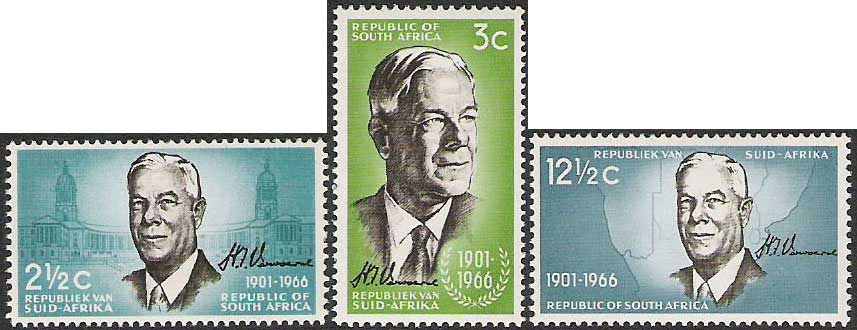
South African postage stamps commemorating Hendrik Verwoerd in 1966

The town of Orania in the Northern Cape province houses the Verwoerd collection—memorabilia collected during Verwoerd's lifetime which is now on display in the house where his widow lived for her final years. She died in 2000 at the age of 98. Verwoerd's legacy in South Africa today is controversial. For many black South Africans, Verwoerd is regarded as the epitome of evil and a symbol of apartheid itself. Among white South Africans, he is now largely seen as an embarrassment, though a minority still praise him. In 2004, however, Verwoerd was voted one of the top 20 South Africans of all time in the TV show Great South Africans. Melanie Verwoerd, who was married to Verwoerd's grandson Willem, joined the African National Congress (ANC). She recalled that bearing the surname Verwoerd always produced awkward stares in ANC circles and she had to explain that she was indeed the granddaughter-in-law of the former prime minister.

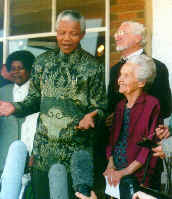
President Nelson Mandela, Betsie Verwoerd and Carel Boshoff during Mandela's visit to Orania

In 1992, Verwoerd's widow, Betsie Verwoerd, moved to Orania, the Afrikaner settlement founded by her son-in-law. She was visited there by South Africa's first democratically elected president, Nelson Mandela, in 1995.

On the 50th anniversary of Verwoerd's assassination in 2016, some in South Africa argued that Tsafendas should be regarded as an anti-apartheid hero.

Many major roads, places, and facilities in South African cities and towns were named after Verwoerd. In post-apartheid South Africa, there has been a campaign to take down statues of Verwoerd and rename streets and infrastructure named after him. Famous examples include H. F. Verwoerd Airport in Port Elizabeth, renamed Chief Dawid Stuurman International Airport; the Verwoerd Dam in the Free State, now the Gariep Dam; H. F. Verwoerd Academic Hospital in Pretoria, now Steve Biko Academic Hospital; and the town of Verwoerdburg, now Centurion.

Journalist Daniel A. Gross has argued that focusing on Verwoerd as the "architect of apartheid" is too convenient, as it allows the injustices of apartheid to be blamed on a single individual. Gross stated this view risks excusing the many other people who were involved in creating and maintaining the system.

== Depiction on stamps and coins ==
Following his death, Verwoerd was memorialised on a commemorative postage stamp series issued in late 1966, which featured his portrait designed by artist Irmin Henkel.

He was also depicted on the obverses of a pair of .800 fine silver 1 Rand coins dated 1967, which were struck to commemorate him.

== Footnotes ==
Notes

Citations

Political offices
Preceded by J. G. Strijdom	Prime Minister of South Africa; 1958–1966	Succeeded by B. J. Vorster
