= Cabinet of F. W. de Klerk =

De Klerk Cabinet
- 8th Cabinet of the Republic of South Africa (since the 1961 Constitution)
- 1989–1994
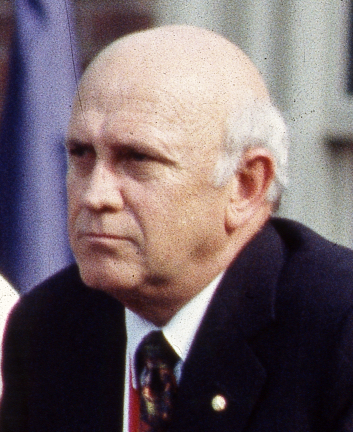
- Frederik de Klerk (1993)
- Date formed: 14 August 1989
- Date dissolved: 10 May 1994 (4 years, 8 months and 26 days)

People and organisations
- State President: Frederik de Klerk
- No. of ministers: 34 ministers
- Member parties: National Party
- Status in legislature: Majority
- Opposition parties: Conservative Party
- Opposition leaders: Andries Treurnicht (until 1993); Ferdi Hartzenberg (from 1993)

History
- Election: 1989 election
- Predecessor: Botha II
- Successor: Mandela

The cabinet of Frederik de Klerk was in office from 14 August 1989 to 10 May 1994. The cabinet was entirely composed of white ministers until 1993, when three non-white ministers were appointed in minor roles.

== Cabinet ==
Ministry / Portfolio	Minister / Incumbent	Party	Period
State President of South Africa	Frederik de Klerk	NP	1989–1994
Minister of Foreign Affairs	Pik Botha	NP	1989–1994
Minister of Development and Cooperation	Gerrit Viljoen; Roelf Meyer	NP	1989–1992; 1992–1994
Minister of Education	Gerrit Viljoen	NP	1980–1989
Minister of Finance	Barend du Plessis; Derek Keys	NP	1989–1992; 1992–1994
Minister of Justice	Kobie Coetsee	NP	1989–1994
Minister of Defence	Magnus Malan; Roelf Meyer; Gene Louw; Kobie Coetsee	NP	1989–1991; 1991–1992; 1992–1993; 1993–1994
Minister of Home Affairs	Gene Louw; Louis Pienaar; Danie Schutte	NP	1989–1992; 1992–1993; 1993–1994
Minister of Transport	George Bartlett; Piet Welgemoed	NP	1989–1991; 1991–1994
Minister of State Security	Frederik de Klerk	NP	1989–1994
Minister of Law and Order	Adriaan Vlok; Hernus Kriel	NP	1989–1991; 1991–1994
Minister of Correctional Services	Adriaan Vlok	NP	1991–1994
Minister of Agriculture and Fisheries	Kraai van Niekerk	NP	1990–1994
Minister of Planning and Provincial Affairs	Hernus Kriel; Leon Wessels	NP	1989–1991; 1991–1992
Minister of Local Government	Amie Venter; Leon Wessels; Tertius Delport	NP	1989–1992; 1992–1993; 1993–1994
Minister of Housing	Sam de Beer; Leon Wessels; Louis Shill	NP	1989–1991; 1992–1993; 1993–1994
Minister of National Education	Gene Louw; Louis Pienaar; Piet Marais	NP	1989–1990; 1990–1992; 1992–1994
Minister of Education and Training	Stoffel van der Merwe; Sam de Beer	NP	1989–1991; 1991–1994
Minister of Education and Culture whites	Piet Clase; Piet Marais	NP	1989–1991; 1991–1994
Minister of Education and Culture coloureds	Abe Williams	LP	1992–1993
Minister of Mining and Energy	Dawie de Villiers; George Bartlett	NP	1989–1991; 1991–1994
Minister of Economic Affairs	Dawie de Villiers; Derek Keys	NP	1991–1992; 1992–1994
Minister of State Enterprises	Dawie de Villiers	NP	1989–1994
Minister of Public Works	George Bartlett; Leon Wessels; Gene Louw; Louis Shill	NP	1989–1991; 1991–1992; 1992–1993; 1993–1994
Minister of Regions and Land Affairs	Jacob de Villiers; André Fourie	NP	1989–1993; 1993–1994
Minister of Water Affairs and Forestry	Gert Kotzé; Magnus Malan	NP	1989–1991; 1991–1993
Minister of Budget and Public Expenditure	Amie Venter	NP	1989–1994
Minister of Environmental Affairs; Minister of Environment and Water	Gert Kotzé; Louis Pienaar; Japie van Wyk	NP	1989–1990; 1990–1993; 1993–1994
Minister of Social Affairs	Piet Badenhorst; Rina Venter	NP	1989–1993; 1993–1994
Minister of Health	Rina Venter	NP	1989–1994
Minister of Sport	Abe Williams	LP	1993–1994
Minister of Development	Jac Rabie	LP	1989–1994
Minister of Tourism	Kent Durr; Org Marais; Bhadra Ranchod	NP	1989–1991; 1991–1993; 1993–1994
Minister of Communication	Roelf Meyer	NP	1991–1994
Minister of Post and Telecommunications	Piet Welgemoed	NP	1991–1994
