= Krugersdorp (House of Assembly of South Africa constituency) =

- Former constituency for the South African House of Assembly
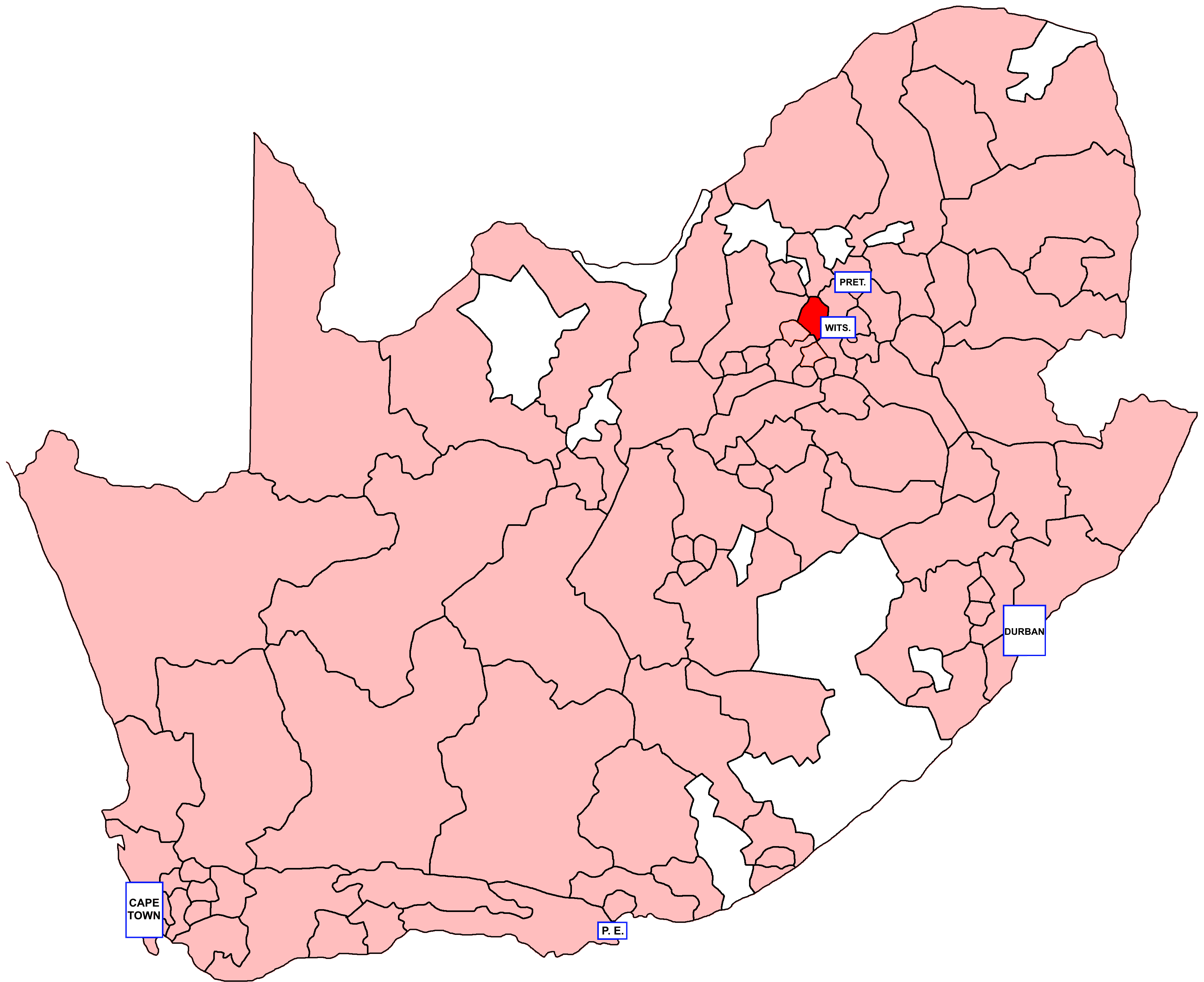
- Location of Krugersdorp within South Africa (1981)
- Province: Transvaal
- Electorate: 22,398 (1989)

Former constituency
- Created: 1910
- Abolished: 1994
- Number of members: 1
- Last MHA: Leon Wessels (NP)
- Replaced by: Gauteng

Krugersdorp was a constituency in the Transvaal Province of South Africa, which existed from 1910 to 1994. It covered a part of the West Rand centred on the town of Krugersdorp. Throughout its existence it elected one member to the House of Assembly and one to the Transvaal Provincial Council.

== Franchise notes ==
When the Union of South Africa was formed in 1910, the electoral qualifications in use in each pre-existing colony were kept in place. In the Transvaal Colony, and its predecessor the South African Republic, the vote was restricted to white men, and as such, elections in the Transvaal Province were held on a whites-only franchise from the beginning. The franchise was also restricted by property and education qualifications until the 1933 general election, following the passage of the Women's Enfranchisement Act, 1930 and the Franchise Laws Amendment Act, 1931. From then on, the franchise was given to all white citizens aged 21 or over. Non-whites remained disenfranchised until the end of apartheid and the introduction of universal suffrage in 1994.

== History ==
Krugersdorp had a largely Afrikaans-speaking electorate, and in its later years was a safe seat for the governing National Party, but it passed through several different hands before that. Its most notable early MP was mining magnate Abe Bailey, who sat as an independent but was considered close to the Unionist and South African parties. He stood for re-election as an SAP candidate in 1924, but was defeated by Dutch Reformed Church minister Bernhardus Hattingh for the National Party. Hattingh died in 1934, as his party was preparing to merge into the new United Party, and in the resulting by-election, the seat was captured by Labour candidate Marthinus Johannes van den Berg. The latter would serve in parliament until 1970, defecting to the Herenigde Nasionale Party ahead of the 1948 general election and serving out his career on the government benches. Krugersdorp's last MP, Leon Wessels, served in cabinet under F. W. de Klerk and was seen as a verlig ("enlightened" or liberal) Nationalist; he faced a stiff challenge from Clive Derby-Lewis in 1987 but held his seat. After the end of apartheid he would go on to serve on the South African Human Rights Commission.

== Members ==
Election	Member	Party
1910	J. W. S. Langerman	Het Volk
1915	Abe Bailey	Independent
1920	Abe Bailey	Independent
1921	Abe Bailey	Independent
1924	B. R. Hattingh	National
1929	B. R. Hattingh	National
1933	B. R. Hattingh	National
1934 by	M. J. van den Berg	Labour
1938	M. J. van den Berg	Labour
1943	M. J. van den Berg	Labour
1948	M. J. van den Berg	HNP
1953	M. J. van den Berg	National
1958	M. J. van den Berg	National
1961	M. J. van den Berg	National
1966	M. J. van den Berg	National
1970	J. A. F. Nel	National
1974	J. J. Vilonel	National
1977	Leon Wessels	National
1981	Leon Wessels	National
1987	Leon Wessels	National
1989	Leon Wessels	National
1994	Constituency abolished	

== Detailed results ==
=== Elections in the 1910s ===
General election 1910: Krugersdorp
Party	Candidate	Votes	%	±%
Het Volk	J. W. S. Langerman	1,065	52.4	New
Unionist	Abe Bailey	968	47.6	New
Majority		97	4.8	N/A
Het Volk win (new seat)				

General election 1915: Krugersdorp
Party	Candidate	Votes	%	±%
Independent	Abe Bailey	1,153	57.2	+9.6
National	H. J. Poutsma	523	26.0	New
Labour	E. Creswell	339	16.8	New
Majority		630	31.2	N/A
Turnout		2,015	76.4	N/A
Independent gain from South African		Swing	N/A	

=== Elections in the 1920s ===
General election 1920: Krugersdorp
Party	Candidate	Votes	%	±%
Independent	Abe Bailey	875	37.4	−19.8
National	B. R. Hattingh	852	36.4	+10.4
Labour	W. G. Delport	614	26.2	+9.5
Majority		23	1.0	−30.2
Turnout		2,341	74.5	−1.9
Independent hold		Swing	-15.1	

General election 1921: Krugersdorp
Party	Candidate	Votes	%	±%
Independent	Abe Bailey	1,158	44.5	+7.1
National	B. R. Hattingh	1,022	39.3	+2.9
Labour	E. Creswell	420	16.2	−10.0
Majority		136	5.2	+4.2
Turnout		2,600	74.6	+0.1
Independent hold		Swing	+2.1	

General election 1924: Krugersdorp
Party	Candidate	Votes	%	±%
National	B. R. Hattingh	1,386	57.6	+18.3
South African	Abe Bailey	1,010	42.0	−2.5
Rejected ballots		11	0.4	N/A
Majority		376	15.6	N/A
Turnout		2,600	74.6	+0.1
National gain from South African		Swing	+10.4	

General election 1929: Krugersdorp
Party	Candidate	Votes	%	±%
National	B. R. Hattingh	1,393	54.4	−3.2
South African	J. T. Halse	1,163	45.4	+3.4
Rejected ballots		7	0.2	-0.2
Majority		230	9.0	−6.6
Turnout		2,563	84.4	+9.8
National hold		Swing	-3.3	

=== Elections in the 1930s ===
General election 1933: Krugersdorp
Party	Candidate	Votes	%	±%
National	B. R. Hattingh	2,585	54.9	+0.5
Independent	W. G. Delport	2,030	43.1	New
Rejected ballots		94	2.0	+1.8
Majority		555	11.8	N/A
Turnout		4,709	70.6	−13.8
National hold		Swing	N/A	

Krugersdorp by-election, 21 March 1934
Party	Candidate	Votes	%	±%
Labour	M. J. van den Berg	1,964	43.6	New
National	B. J. Pienaar	1,282	28.5	−26.4
Independent	W. G. Delport	1,214	27.0	−16.1
Rejected ballots		40	0.9	-1.1
Majority		682	15.2	N/A
Turnout		4,500	70.7	+0.1
Labour gain from National		Swing	N/A	

General election 1938: Krugersdorp
Party	Candidate	Votes	%	±%
Labour	M. J. van den Berg	2,522	38.7	New
United	W. G. Delport	2,429	37.2	N/A
Purified National	C. W. M. du Toit	1,545	23.7	New
Rejected ballots		25	0.4	N/A
Majority		93	1.4	N/A
Turnout		6,521	80.2	N/A
Labour gain from National		Swing	N/A	
