= Cradock (House of Assembly of South Africa constituency) =

- Former constituency for the South African House of Assembly
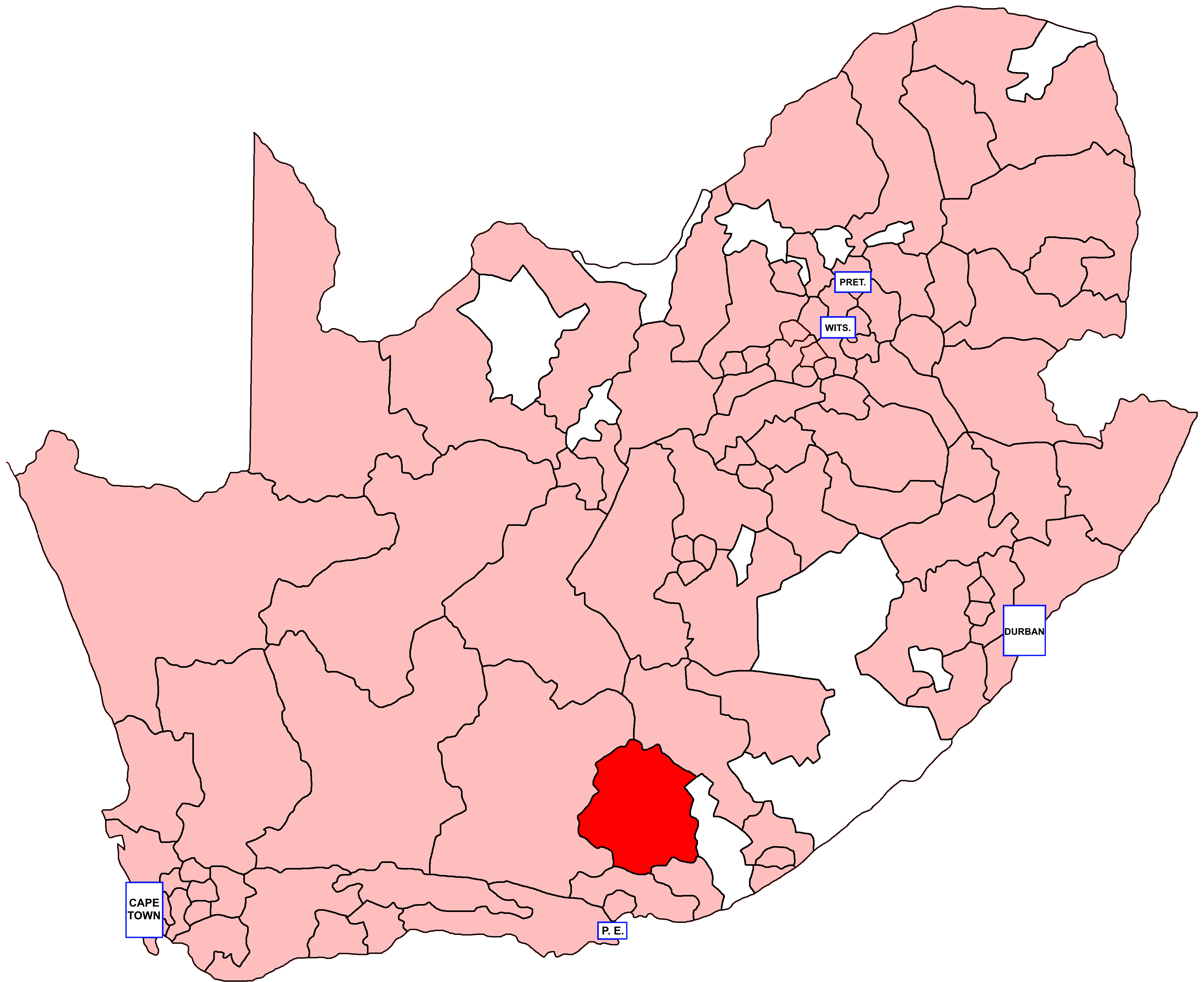
- Location of Cradock within South Africa (1981)
- Province: Cape of Good Hope
- Electorate: 10,364 (1989)

Former constituency
- Created: 1910
- Abolished: 1994
- Number of members: 1
- Last MHA: Tobie Meyer (NP)
- Replaced by: Eastern Cape

Cradock was a constituency in the Cape Province of South Africa, which existed from 1910 to 1994. It covered a rural area of the Eastern Cape centred on the town of Cradock (since renamed Nxuba). Throughout its existence it elected one member to the House of Assembly and one to the Cape Provincial Council.

== Franchise notes ==
When the Union of South Africa was formed in 1910, the electoral qualifications in use in each pre-existing colony were kept in place. The Cape Colony had implemented a "colour-blind" franchise known as the Cape Qualified Franchise, which included all adult literate men owning more than £75 worth of property (controversially raised from £25 in 1892), and this initially remained in effect after the colony became the Cape Province. As of 1908, 22,784 out of 152,221 electors in the Cape Colony were "Native or Coloured". Eligibility to serve in Parliament and the Provincial Council, however, was restricted to whites from 1910 onward.

The first challenge to the Cape Qualified Franchise came with the Women's Enfranchisement Act, 1930 and the Franchise Laws Amendment Act, 1931, which extended the vote to women and removed property qualifications for the white population only – non-white voters remained subject to the earlier restrictions. In 1936, the Representation of Natives Act removed all black voters from the common electoral roll and introduced three "Native Representative Members", white MPs elected by the black voters of the province and meant to represent their interests in particular. A similar provision was made for Coloured voters with the Separate Representation of Voters Act, 1951, and although this law was challenged by the courts, it went into effect in time for the 1958 general election, which was thus held with all-white voter rolls for the first time in South African history. The all-white franchise would continue until the end of apartheid and the introduction of universal suffrage in 1994.

== History ==
Unlike most of the Eastern Cape, Cradock had a largely Afrikaans-speaking electorate, and tended to vote more like its neighbours to the north and west than the ones to its east. For much of its early history, the seat was closely contested between the South African and National parties, switching hands several times. In 1915, it was the first seat contested by a young D. F. Malan. Its longest-serving MP, Gerard François Hermanus Bekker, was elected in 1938 for the United Party, but switched to the Herenigde Nasionale Party on that party’s formation, and was re-elected as a Nationalist in every subsequent election until 1966. By then, Cradock was a safe seat for the National Party, who would hold it throughout the remainder of its existence, usually by large margins and sometimes unopposed. Its last MP, Tobie Meyer, served as a deputy minister under both F. W. de Klerk and Nelson Mandela before retiring from politics in 1996.

== Members ==
Election	Member	Party
1910	Harry van Heerden	SAP
1915	Harry van Heerden	SAP
1920	I. P. van Heerden	National
1921	I. P. van Heerden	National
1924	G. C. van Heerden	SAP
1929	J. F. van G. Bekker	National
1933	J. F. van G. Bekker	National
1934	J. F. van G. Bekker	GNP
1938	G. F. H. Bekker	United
1940	G. F. H. Bekker	HNP
1943	G. F. H. Bekker	HNP
1948	G. F. H. Bekker	HNP
1953	G. F. H. Bekker	National
1958	G. F. H. Bekker	National
1961	G. F. H. Bekker	National
1966	G. de V. Morrison	National
1970	G. de V. Morrison	National
1977	G. de V. Morrison	National
1981	G. de V. Morrison	National
1987	Tobie Meyer	National
1989	Tobie Meyer	National
1994	constituency abolished	

== Detailed results ==
=== Elections in the 1910s ===
General election 1910: Cradock
Party	Candidate	Votes	%	±%
South African	Harry van Heerden	Unopposed		
South African win (new seat)				

General election 1915: Cradock
Party	Candidate	Votes	%	±%
South African	Harry van Heerden	1,488	55.5	N/A
National	D. F. Malan	1,195	44.5	New
Majority		293	11.0	N/A
Turnout		2,683	88.2	N/A
South African hold		Swing	N/A	

=== Elections in the 1920s ===
General election 1920: Cradock
Party	Candidate	Votes	%	±%
National	I. P. van Heerden	1,525	51.7	+7.2
South African	Harry van Heerden	1,427	48.3	−7.2
Majority		98	3.4	N/A
Turnout		2,952	79.8	−8.4
National gain from South African		Swing	+7.2	

General election 1921: Cradock
Party	Candidate	Votes	%	±%
National	I. P. van Heerden	1,605	51.5	−0.2
South African	A. C. A. van Rooy	1,512	48.5	+0.2
Majority		93	3.0	−0.4
Turnout		3,246	77.3	−1.5
National hold		Swing	-0.2	

General election 1924: Cradock
Party	Candidate	Votes	%	±%
South African	G. C. van Heerden	1,819	50.5	+2.0
National	I. P. van Heerden	1,773	49.2	−2.3
Rejected ballots		13	0.3	N/A
Majority		46	1.3	N/A
Turnout		3,605	89.8	+12.5
South African gain from National		Swing	+2.1	

General election 1929: Cradock
Party	Candidate	Votes	%	±%
National	J. F. van G. Bekker	1,784	58.5	+9.3
South African	P. J. J. Coetzee	1,244	40.9	−9.6
Rejected ballots		20	0.6	+0.3
Majority		540	16.6	N/A
Turnout		3,048	86.7	−3.1
National gain from South African		Swing	+9.4	

=== Elections in the 1930s ===
General election 1933: Cradock
Party	Candidate	Votes	%	±%
National	J. F. van G. Bekker	Unopposed		
National hold				

General election 1938: Cradock
Party	Candidate	Votes	%	±%
United	G. F. H. Bekker	2,933	52.8	New
Purified National	J. F. van G. Bekker	2,536	45.7	N/A
Independent	P. J. J. Coetzee	36	0.6	New
Rejected ballots		48	0.9	N/A
Majority		397	7.1	N/A
Turnout		5,553	86.7	N/A
United gain from Purified National		Swing	N/A	

=== Elections in the 1940s ===
General election 1943: Cradock
Party	Candidate	Votes	%	±%
Reunited National	G. F. H. Bekker	3,748	50.8	+4.7
United	J. A. Cull	3,625	49.2	−4.1
Majority		123	1.6	N/A
Turnout		7,373	85.1	−0.8
Reunited National hold		Swing	+4.4	

(Note: as Bekker stood as the UP candidate in 1938 and as the HNP candidate in 1943, the seat is counted as a hold (same person) but Bekker's voteshare in 1943 is compared to that of his opponent in 1938)

General election 1948: Cradock
Party	Candidate	Votes	%	±%
Reunited National	G. F. H. Bekker	5,038	58.6	+7.8
United	J. A. Cull	3,560	41.4	−7.8
Majority		1,478	17.2	+15.6
Turnout		8,598	87.8	+2.7
Reunited National hold		Swing	+7.8	
