= Paarl (House of Assembly of South Africa constituency) =

South African constituency, 1910–1994

- Former constituency for the South African House of Assembly
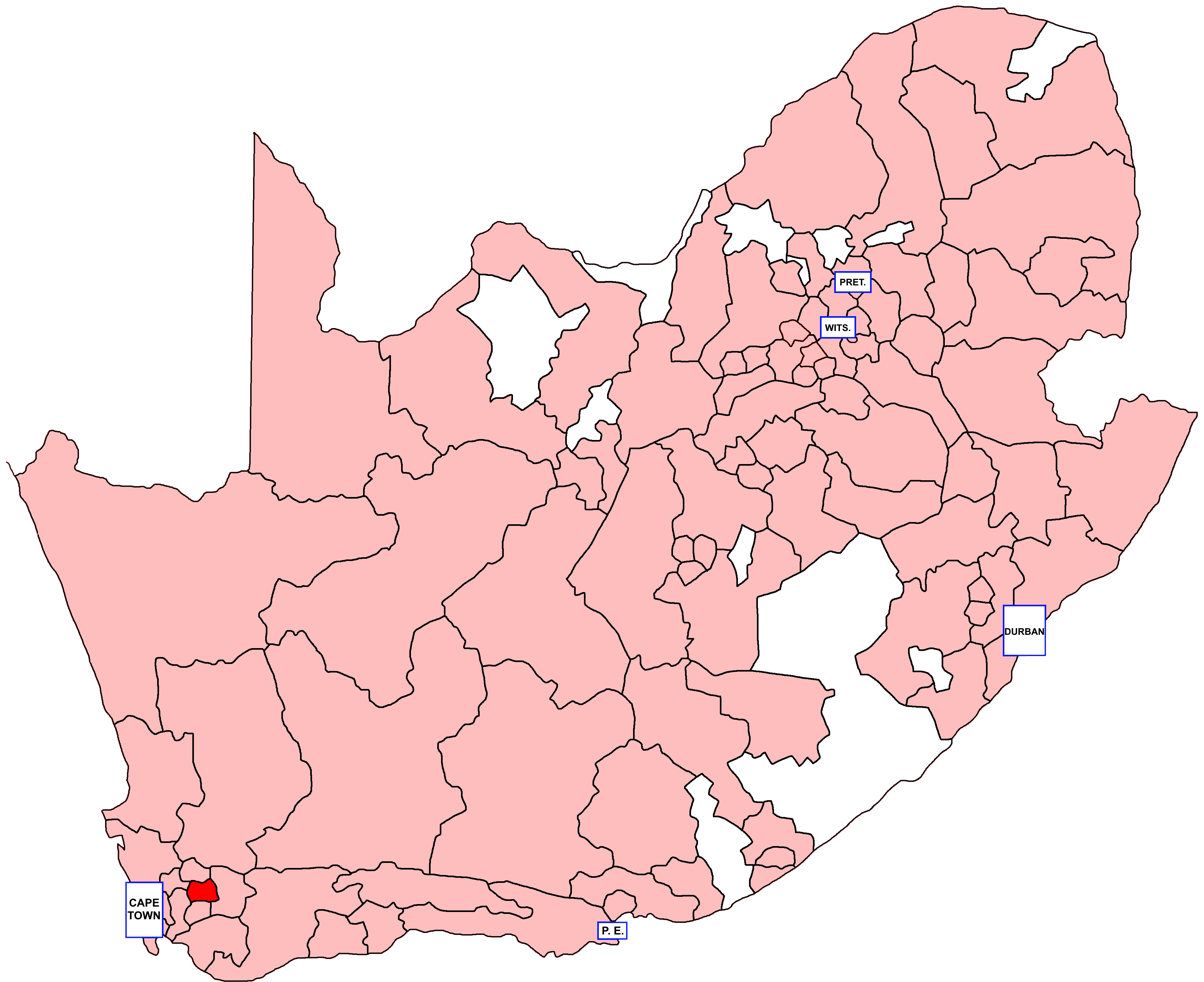
- Location of Paarl within South Africa (1981)
- Province: Cape of Good Hope
- Electorate: 12,943 (1989)

Former constituency
- Created: 1910
- Abolished: 1994
- Number of members: 1
- Last MHA: Gene Louw (NP)
- Replaced by: Western Cape

Paarl was a constituency in the Cape Province of South Africa, which existed from 1910 to 1994. The constituency covered a part of the Boland region centred on the town of Paarl. Throughout its existence it elected one member to the House of Assembly and one to the Cape Provincial Council.

== Franchise notes ==
When the Union of South Africa was formed in 1910, the electoral qualifications in use in each pre-existing colony were kept in place. The Cape Colony had implemented a “colour-blind” franchise known as the Cape Qualified Franchise, which included all adult literate men owning more than £75 worth of property (controversially raised from £25 in 1892), and this initially remained in effect after the colony became the Cape Province. As of 1908, 22,784 out of 152,221 electors in the Cape Colony were “Native or Coloured”. Eligibility to serve in Parliament and the Provincial Council, however, was restricted to whites from 1910 onward.

The first challenge to the Cape Qualified Franchise came with the Women's Enfranchisement Act, 1930 and the Franchise Laws Amendment Act, 1931, which extended the vote to women and removed property qualifications for the white population only – non-white voters remained subject to the earlier restrictions. In 1936, the Representation of Natives Act removed all black voters from the common electoral roll and introduced three “Native Representative Members”, white MPs elected by the black voters of the province and meant to represent their interests in particular. A similar provision was made for Coloured voters with the Separate Representation of Voters Act, 1951, and although this law was challenged by the courts, it went into effect in time for the 1958 general election, which was thus held with all-white voter rolls for the first time in South African history. The all-white franchise would continue until the end of apartheid and the introduction of universal suffrage in 1994.

== History ==
As one of the larger regional towns in the Cape, Paarl tended to be slightly more liberal than its surroundings, but it was still a safe seat for the governing National Party for much of its later period of existence. Early on, though, it was a marginal seat, frequently changing hands between the National and South African/United parties. Nationalist MP P. P. du Toit managed to hold the seat in 1938 after joining the United Party, and after being lost to the Purified National Party in a 1939 by-election, it returned to the UP fold in 1943. In 1948, however, Paarl fell to the Reunified National Party as part of their sweep of rural South Africa, and they would retain the seat until the end of apartheid. Its final MP, former Durbanville representative Gene Louw, served as the last Speaker of the House of Assembly while representing the seat.

== Members ==
Election	Member	Party
1910	A. L. de Jager	South African
1915	A. L. de Jager	South African
1920	A. L. de Jager	South African
1921	A. L. de Jager	South African
1924	A. L. de Jager	South African
1929	P. P. du Toit	National
1933	P. P. du Toit	National
1934	P. P. du Toit	United
1938	P. P. du Toit	United
1939 by	P. J. Hugo	HNP
1943	J. C. Faure	United
1948	P. J. Hugo	HNP
1953	P. J. Hugo	National
1958	W. C. Malan	National
1961	W. C. Malan	National
1966	W. C. Malan	National
1970	W. C. Malan	National
1974	W. C. Malan	National
1977	W. C. Malan	National
1981	J. W. H. Meiring	National
1987	J. W. H. Meiring	National
1989	Gene Louw	National
1994	constituency abolished	

== Detailed results ==
=== Elections in the 1910s ===
General election 1910: Paarl
Party	Candidate	Votes	%	±%
South African	A. L. de Jager	1,218	50.7	New
Independent	S. P. H. de Villiers	1,185	49.3	New
Majority		33	1.4	N/A
South African win (new seat)				

General election 1915: Paarl
Party	Candidate	Votes	%	±%
South African	A. L. de Jager	1,785	64.5	+13.8
National	W. B. de Villiers	982	35.5	New
Majority		805	29.0	N/A
Turnout		2,767	87.0	N/A
South African hold		Swing	N/A	

=== Elections in the 1920s ===
General election 1920: Paarl
Party	Candidate	Votes	%	±%
South African	A. L. de Jager	1,819	58.0	−6.5
National	P. P. du Toit	1,200	38.3	+2.8
Labour	C. H. Haggar	115	3.7	New
Majority		619	19.7	−9.3
Turnout		3,134	81.4	−5.6
South African hold		Swing	-4.7	

General election 1921: Paarl
Party	Candidate	Votes	%	±%
South African	A. L. de Jager	1,925	59.9	+1.9
National	F. G. W. Roux	1,289	40.1	+1.8
Majority		636	19.8	+0.1
Turnout		3,214	77.8	−3.6
South African hold		Swing	+0.1	

General election 1924: Paarl
Party	Candidate	Votes	%	±%
South African	A. L. de Jager	1,751	52.1	−7.8
National	P. P. du Toit	1,578	47.0	+6.9
Rejected ballots		31	0.9	N/A
Majority		173	5.1	−14.7
Turnout		3,360	84.0	+6.2
South African hold		Swing	-7.4	

General election 1929: Paarl
Party	Candidate	Votes	%	±%
National	P. P. du Toit	1,829	50.3	+3.3
South African	F. A. Joubert	1,764	48.6	−3.5
Rejected ballots		38	1.1	+0.2
Majority		65	1.7	N/A
Turnout		3,631	91.4	+7.4
National gain from South African		Swing	+3.4	

=== Elections in the 1930s ===
General election 1933: Paarl
Party	Candidate	Votes	%	±%
National	P. P. du Toit	3,797	68.4	+18.1
Independent	T. Köhler	1,643	29.6	New
Rejected ballots		115	2.0	+0.9
Majority		2,154	38.8	N/A
Turnout		5,555	73.8	−17.6
National hold		Swing	N/A	

General election 1938: Paarl
Party	Candidate	Votes	%	±%
United	P. P. du Toit	3,991	51.8	−16.6
Purified National	P. J. Hugo	3,654	47.4	New
Rejected ballots		63	0.8	-1.2
Majority		337	4.4	N/A
Turnout		7,708	94.3	+20.5
United hold		Swing	N/A	

Paarl by-election, 19 April 1939
Party	Candidate	Votes	%	±%
Purified National	P. J. Hugo	4,006	50.4	+3.0
United	F. P. S. le Roux	3,899	49.1	−2.7
Rejected ballots		39	0.5	-0.3
Majority		107	1.3	N/A
Turnout		7,944	94.2	−0.1
Purified National gain from United		Swing	+2.9	
