= Fanus Schoeman =

South African politician and diplomat (born 1945)

Member of the National Assembly
- In office May 1994 – June 1999

Personal details
- Born: 29 June 1945 (age 81)
- Citizenship: South Africa
- Party: National Party; New National Party
- Education: University of Pretoria

Stefanus Johannes "Fanus" Schoeman (born 29 June 1945) is a South African politician and diplomat who represented the National Party (NP) in Parliament until 1999. Formerly the leader of the NP in Pretoria, he became a diplomat after leaving Parliament.

== Life and career ==
Schoeman was born on 29 June 1945 and completed a bachelor's degree at the University of Pretoria. He represented the NP in the apartheid government, most proximately as Deputy Minister of Justice and Constitutional Development during the democratic transition of the early 1990s. He represented Sunnyside in the House of Assembly of South Africa.

In South Africa's first post-apartheid elections in 1994, Schoeman was elected to an NP seat in the new National Assembly. During the legislative term that followed, he served as executive director of the NP and later as spokesperson to former President F. W. de Klerk. He was also the chair of the NP's regional branch in Pretoria; in 1997, de Klerk supported his bid to succeed Roelf Meyer as the NP's provincial leader in Gauteng, but he was narrowly defeated by Sam de Beer.

Schoeman left the National Assembly after the 1999 general election and subsequently served in ambassadorial posts in Singapore, from 2000 to 2004, and in South Korea, until 2009.
