= Ebrahim Rasool =

South African politician and diplomat

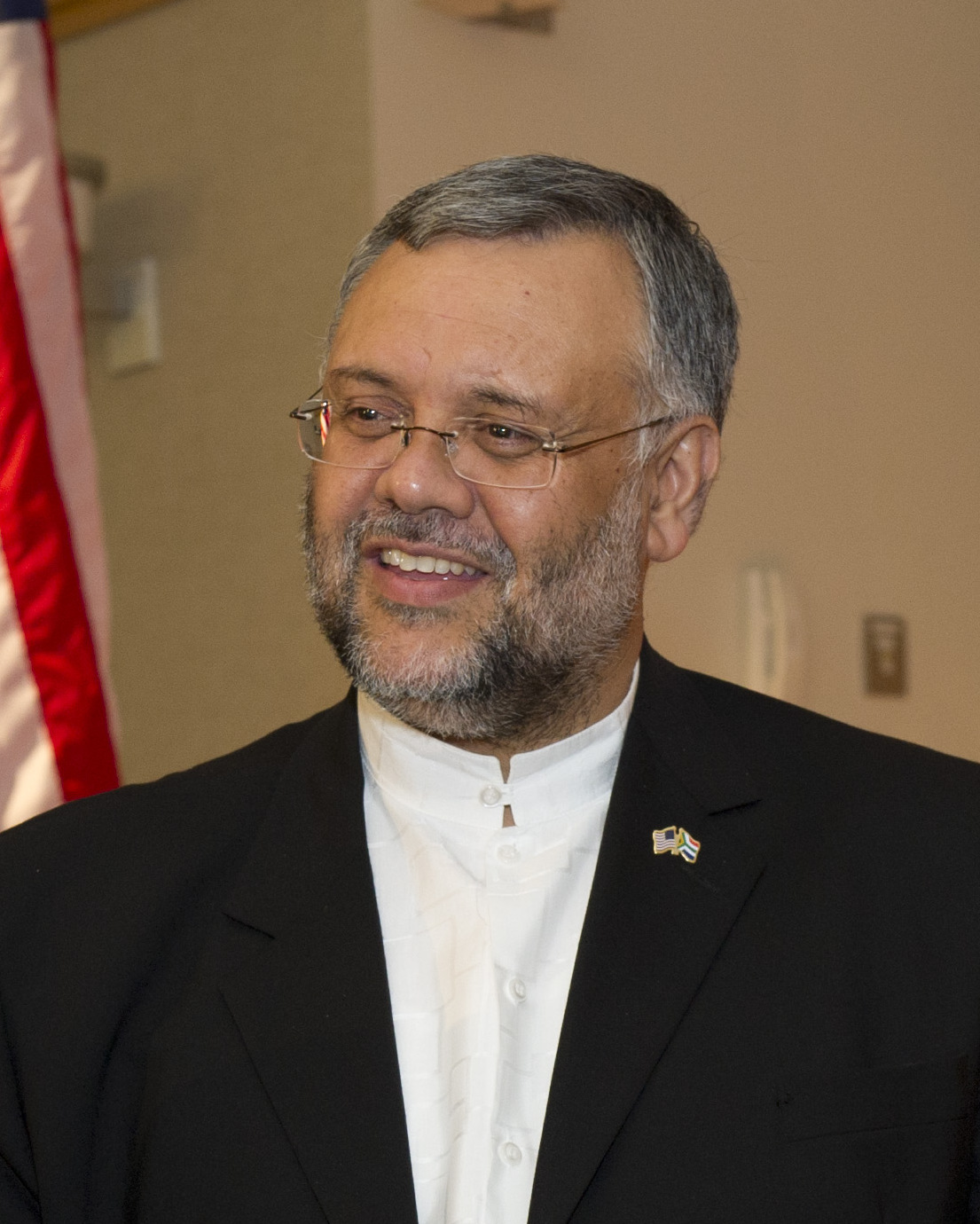
- Rasool in July 2012

South African Ambassador to the United States
- In office 13 January 2025 – 14 March 2025
- President: Cyril Ramaphosa
- Preceded by: Ndumiso Ntshinga
- Succeeded by: Roelf Meyer
- In office 4 August 2010 – 23 February 2015
- President: Jacob Zuma
- Preceded by: Welile Nhlapo
- Succeeded by: M. J. Mahlangu

5th Premier of the Western Cape
- In office 30 April 2004 – 25 July 2008
- Preceded by: Marthinus van Schalkwyk
- Succeeded by: Lynne Brown

Personal details
- Born: 15 July 1962 (age 64) Cape Town, Cape Province, South Africa
- Party: African National Congress
- Spouse: Rosieda Shabodien
- Children: 2
- Parent(s): Ismail and Aziza Rasool
- Education: University of Cape Town (BA)

Ebrahim Rasool (born 15 July 1962) is a South African politician and former diplomat who served as the South African ambassador to the United States from 2010 to 2015 and again in 2025, as a member of the National Assembly from 2009 to 2010, and as the 5th premier of the Western Cape from 2004 to 2008. He is a member of the African National Congress and has held various leadership positions in the party.

On 14 March 2025, while serving as ambassador to the US, Rasool was declared persona non grata by Secretary of State Marco Rubio over his criticism of the Trump administration, and expelled from the United States.

== Early life and education ==
Ebrahim Rasool was born 15 July 1962 in District Six, Cape Town, to a Muslim family of mixed English-Javanese-Dutch-Indian heritage. The apartheid system classified him as Coloured. When he was nine years old, he and his family were forcibly evicted from the area in which they lived due to the government declaring the area a "Whites-only" residential suburb, and his family relocated to Primose Park near Manenberg on the Cape Flats.

Rasool graduated from Livingstone High School in Claremont in 1980. He then studied at the University of Cape Town, graduating with a bachelor of arts degree in 1983 and receiving a Higher Diploma in Education in 1984. While at the University, Rasool became involved in student politics. He was employed as a teacher at Spine Road High School in 1985.

== Political career ==
He soon became involved in the anti-apartheid movement. He held senior positions in the United Democratic Front and the African National Congress. He served prison sentences and was also frequently placed under house arrest. Between 1991 and 1994, he was an assistant to the Rector of the University of the Western Cape and the Treasurer of the ANC's provincial structure.

Rasool was elected to the Western Cape Provincial Legislature in April 1994 following the country's first democratic election. He served as the MEC for Health and Social Services from 1994 to 1998. In 1998, he was elected Provincial Chairperson of the ANC. He was appointed the MEC for Finance and Economic Development in 2001 and held this position until his appointment as the 5th Premier of the Western Cape in April 2004. Mcebisi Skwatsha succeeded him as Provincial Chairperson.

Following the arrest of gang leader Quinton Marinus, or "Mr Big", Rasool and the then Western Cape Provincial Minister of Community Safety, Leonard Ramatlakane, started receiving death threats allegedly from the Chinese triads. This led Ramatlakane to controversially spend R347,716 of public money on security improvements to his home.

On 14 July 2008, Rasool was recalled from the position of premier by the National Executive Committee of the ANC, as the ANC leadership had disapproved of him giving preference to the large Muslim and Cape Coloured populations in the Western Cape. The MEC for Economic Development and Tourism Lynne Brown was designated as his successor.

Rasool then briefly worked as a special advisor to the President of South Africa, Thabo Mbeki, prior to him being elected a Member of the National Assembly in April 2009. President Jacob Zuma appointed him as South Africa's Ambassador to the United States in July 2010. He returned to South Africa in February 2015.

In April 2018, the ANC National Head of Elections, Fikile Mbalula, announced Rasool as the party's Provincial Elections Head for the 2019 general elections. This move was seen as part of a campaign to have him return as Provincial Chairperson of the ANC. Following the elections, the ANC's support declined even further in the province. Rasool was elected as a Member of the Western Cape Provincial Parliament, but tendered his resignation to the incoming Speaker.

Rasool had been ranked 75th on the ANC's national party list for the 2024 general election but this was not high enough for him to be returned to the National Assembly given the ANC's decline in electoral support at the election.

== Expulsion from the United States ==
On 14 March 2025, United States Secretary of State Marco Rubio declared Rasool persona non grata and accused him of being a "race-baiting politician", after Rasool accused President Donald Trump and allies including the South African-born billionaire Elon Musk of promoting white supremacy, in comments to a South African think tank. The expulsion came in the broader context of Trump's criticism of a land expropriation law that he claimed unfairly targeted Afrikaners.

During his second diplomatic tenure in Washington, D.C. in 2025, which culminated in his expulsion from the United States, Rasool faced scrutiny over alleged prior ties to global Islamist networks, including Hamas and Palestinian Islamic Jihad. In 2023, he drew additional attention after posting a photograph on Facebook featuring a keffiyeh signed by Ismail Haniyeh, the political leader of Hamas. Haniyeh had been designated a Specially Designated Global Terrorist by the United States Department of State since 2018.

The expulsion was met with negative reactions in South Africa. In a statement, the office of President Cyril Ramaphosa called the decision "regrettable" and called on "all relevant and impacted stakeholders to maintain the established diplomatic decorum in their engagement with the matter." The Congress of South African Trade Unions praised Rasool, and promised to give him a hero's welcome on his return. The Congress of the People called for South Africa to expel US chargé d'affaires David Greene in return. They also pointed to South Africa's genocide case against Israel as influencing the decision of the Trump administration. Sanusha Naidu said, "for the first time, we see South Africa is dealing with an irrational White House and leadership."

Rasool later told the BBC he believed racism within the Trump administration was "self-evident." He criticized the administration's immigration policies and its targeting of foreign students involved in pro-Palestinian protests. The Trump administration denied allegations of racism, while Rubio defended visa revocations for students accused of causing campus unrest.

== Controversy ==
In 2010, before taking up his position as ambassador to the United States, an investigation was launched into allegations that Rasool was paying a political reporter in a mainstream newspaper to write articles that portrayed him favourably. The investigation stalled due to material witnesses refusing to cooperate with the investigation.

== Personal life ==
Rasool is married to Rosieda Shabodien. They have two children together.

== Bibliography ==
- Rasool, Ebrahim (Winter 2010). "South African Muslims Over Three Centuries: From the Jaws of Islamophobia to the Joys of Equality" (PDF). Arches Quarterly. 4 (7): 147–154. Archived from the original (PDF) on 11 November 2016.

Diplomatic posts
Preceded by Welile Nhlapo	South African Ambassador to the United States; 4 August 2010 – 23 February 2015	Succeeded by M. J. Mahlangu
Government offices
Preceded by Marthinus van Schalkwyk	Premier of the Western Cape; 30 April 2004 – 25 July 2008	Succeeded by Lynne Brown
