= John Wiley (politician) =

South African cricketer and politician

John Walter Edington Wiley

Deputy Minister of Environmental Affairs and Fisheries
- In office 1982–1984
- Prime Minister: P. W. Botha

Minister of Environmental Affairs and Tourism
- In office 1984–1986
- President: P. W. Botha

Environmental Affairs and Water Affairs
- In office 1986–1987
- President: P. W. Botha

Member of the House of Assembly for Simonstown
- In office 30 March 1966 – 29 March 1987

Personal details
- Born: 7 February 1927 St James, Cape Province, South Africa
- Died: 29 March 1987 (aged 60) Noordhoek, Cape Province, South Africa
- Party: National Party
- Other political affiliations: United Party; South African Party
- Education: University of Cape Town; University of Oxford
- Occupation: Lawyer, politician
- Cricket career

Personal information
- Batting: Right-handed
- Bowling: Right-arm medium
- Relatives: William Wiley (brother)

Domestic team information
- Years: Team
- 1947/48: Western Province
- 1949–1951: Oxford University

Career statistics
Competition	First-class
Matches	12
Runs scored	410
Batting average	18.63
100s/50s	–/2
Top score	70
Catches/stumpings	8/–
- Source: John Wiley at Cricinfo

John Walter Edington Wiley (7 February 1927 – 29 March 1987) was a South African first-class cricketer and politician who served as the only white English-speaker in P. W. Botha's majority Afrikaans cabinet.

== Education and cricket ==
The son of James Byron Wiley, he was born in Cape Town suburb of St James in February 1927. He was educated at the Diocesan College, before enrolling at the University of Cape Town to study law. While studying at Cape Town, Wiley played first-class cricket, making two appearances for Western Province against Rhodesia and Orange Free State in the 1947–48 Currie Cup, in addition to making a single appearance for a South African Universities cricket team against the touring Marylebone Cricket Club in the same season. He scored two of what were to be his only first-class half centuries in these matches, with half century scores of 70 runs for Western Province and 50 runs for South African Universities. After graduating from Cape Town, Wiley went to England to study for his master's degree at Lincoln College at the University of Oxford. While studying at Oxford, he appeared in first-class cricket for Oxford University in 1949–1951, making nine appearances. Wiley scored 232 runs for Oxford at an average of 13.64 and a high score of 30.

== Political career ==
Wiley was first elected a Member of Parliament for Simonstown in the 1966 South African general election for the United Party. He was expelled from the United Party following a liberal takeover led by Harry Schwarz, with Wiley founding his own party, the South African Party in 1977, alongside five other expelled United Party MPs. He disbanded the party in 1980, joining the ruling National Party led by P. W. Botha. Upon his joining of the National Party, Wiley triggered a by-election in his Simonstown constituency and notably defended it, defeating the former cricketer Eddie Barlow of the Progressive Federal Party and obtaining a breakthrough for the majority Afrikaans National Party in a predominantly English–speaking constituency.

He later served in Botha's cabinet as its only English-speaking member and held the office of Minister of Environmental Affairs and Tourism from 1984 to 1986 and Minister of Environmental Affairs and Water Affairs from 1986 to 1987, having previously held the post of Deputy Minister of Environmental Affairs and Fisheries from 1982 to 1984. Politically, Wiley was considered to have been a staunch anti-communist and critical of liberalism, a critic of the Soviet Union and softening stance of the west toward it in the 1980s, in addition to supporting the white-minority government of Ian Smith in Rhodesia.

== Death ==
With his Simonstown seat under threat in the 1987 South African general election, Wiley committed suicide by shooting himself in the head in the bedroom of his home on 29 March 1987. The exact motive behind his suicide has remained a matter of speculation, ranging from financial, to a media campaign questioning his probity and speculating about his sexuality, to Wiley being a member of an elite pedophile ring headed by Magnus Malan. The 2018 book The Lost Boys of Bird Island, links his death to that of Dave Allen, another alleged member of the ring. Two weeks after the book's publication, the book's co-author Mark Minnie was found dead with a gunshot wound to the head. The Lost Boys of Bird Island was retracted by publishers Tafelberg Press in 2020. Apologies were issued to family members of those implicated in the publication of the book. One such apology in the Rapport newspaper read: "We...apologise to our readers, Barend du Plessis and the family members of Magnus Malan and John Wiley for the blunder (in lack of fact or fact-checking prior to publication)...Although it had always been a given that we and other media would report on the book, the extremely harmful nature of the alleged offences should have cautioned us in our manner of reporting, which should always aim to serve the truth and minimise damage."
