= The Lost Boys of Bird Island =

Non-fiction book by Mark Minnie

- Author: Mark Minnie and Chris Steyn
- Language: English
- Subject: Corruption in South Africa, Politics of South Africa, Magnus Malan, Paedophilia, Apartheid South Africa.
- Genre: Non-fiction
- Published: Cape Town
- Publisher: Tafelberg
- Publication date: 5 August 2018
- Publication place: South Africa
- Pages: 224
- ISBN: 9780624081449 (Paperback)

The Lost Boys of Bird Island (2018) is a non-fiction book by Mark Minnie, a former police detective and Chris Steyn, an investigative journalist, both from South Africa. The book is about alleged corruption within the last Apartheid government of South Africa and a paedophile network whose most notable members were alleged to be the apartheid-era defence minister Magnus Malan and the minister of environmental affairs John Wiley. The book is named after Bird Island, in Algoa Bay just off the coast of South Africa, where the ring operated. Billed as an exposé of former National Party cabinet ministers taking coloured boys for illicit rendezvous to Bird Island off Port Elizabeth in the 1980s, the controversial “Lost Boys of Bird Island” book has now been withdrawn by its publishers. Unsold copies have been removed from bookstores.

== Background and synopsis ==
The book investigates a paedophile network that allegedly included prominent members of the South African government and business community who took coloured children to Bird Island where they were abused, and some possibly murdered. It details the level of their involvement in the paedophile ring, abuse of the children, alleged acts of murder to cover up the crimes, as well as corruption and abuse of state resources by the network's members.

== Reception ==
The book and its revelations were widely covered in the South African media upon its release in August 2018. Shortly after the book was published, co-author Mark Minnie was found dead in his home outside Port Elizabeth from an apparent suicide. In March 2020, the book was retracted from the market by its publishers, Tafelberg, a subsidiary of NB Publishers, and an apology was issued to the implicated living former minister Barend du Plessis. The apology was not extended to any other individuals mentioned in the book.
