= Bernardus Gerhardus Fourie =

South African diplomat

- Born: 1916; Wolmaransstad, South Africa
- Died: July 2008
- Occupation: Diplomat

Bernardus Gerhardus Fourie (or Brand Fourie) was a South African diplomat. He served as the South African ambassador to the United States from 1982 to 1985.

== Early life ==
Fourie was born in 1916 in Wolmaransstad.

== Career ==
Brand Fourie joined the department South African Department of Foreign Affairs in 1936. He served under six heads of state of South Africa, viz Jan Smuts, Dr DF Malan, JG Strijdom, Hendrik Verwoerd, John Vorster, and PW Botha.

Fourie was an aide to South African Prime Minister Jan Smuts during World War II and attended some of his meetings with UK Prime Minister Winston Churchill. He attended the 1945 launch of the United Nations with Smuts.

He was promoted to director-general of the Department of Foreign Affairs from 1966 until 1983.

In 1985 he retired as South African ambassador to the US.

Fourie was the Secretary of Foreign Affairs for the Republic of South Africa in the 1970s and early 1980s. In 1982, he was appointed South African ambassador to the United States, and served from 4 June 1982 until 23 September 1985. On 21 November 1984, Fourie met four American activists (Mary Frances Berry, Randall Robinson, Walter E. Fauntroy and Eleanor Holmes Norton), who began changing U.S. public opinion about the apartheid regime by refusing to leave the embassy until their demands were met.

From 1985 to 1989, Fourie was chairman of the board of the South African Broadcasting Corporation.

== Death ==
Fourie died in late July 2008 at the age of 91.

His private document collection is housed at the Institute for Contemporary History (INCH): Archive for Contemporary Affairs (ARCA) at the University of the Free State, South Africa.
