= M. J. Mahlangu =

South African politician and diplomat (1952–2025)

Mninwa Johannes Mahlangu
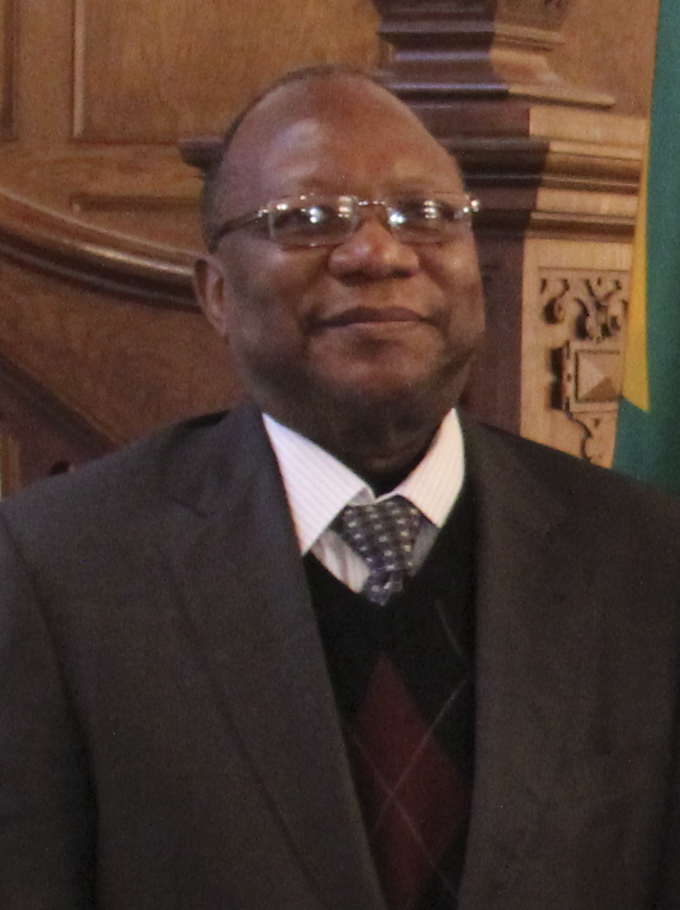

South African Ambassador to the United States
- In office 23 February 2015 – March 2020
- President: Jacob Zuma; Cyril Ramaphosa
- Preceded by: Ebrahim Rasool
- Succeeded by: Nomaindiya Mfeketo

Chairperson of the National Council of Provinces
- In office 21 November 2004 – 21 May 2014
- President: Thabo Mbeki
- Preceded by: Joyce Kgoali
- Succeeded by: Thandi Modise

Personal details
- Born: Mninwa Johannes Mahlangu; 8 October 1952 Union of South Africa
- Died: 24 August 2025 (aged 72) South Africa
- Party: African National Congress
- Spouse: Nomaswazi Christina Mahlangu
- Education: Damelin

Mninwa Johannes Mahlangu (8 October 1952 – 24 August 2025) was a South African politician and diplomat. He was active in the Bantustan politics of Apartheid-era South Africa, serving as a parliamentarian in the former Lebowa homeland. He was a member of the African National Congress, and served as the Chairperson of the National Council of Provinces from 2004 to 2014, and a member of the Pan-African Parliament.

Between 23 February 2015 and March 2020, he was the South African Ambassador to the United States.

Mahlangu died on 24 August 2025, at the age of 72.
