= List of ambassadors of South Africa to the United States =

The position of South African ambassador to the United States was first held in March 1949, following the upgrade of South Africa's diplomatic mission to an embassy. The post has been held by many important politicians and was most recently held by Ebrahim Rasool until being declared persona non grata by Secretary of State Marco Rubio in March 2025.

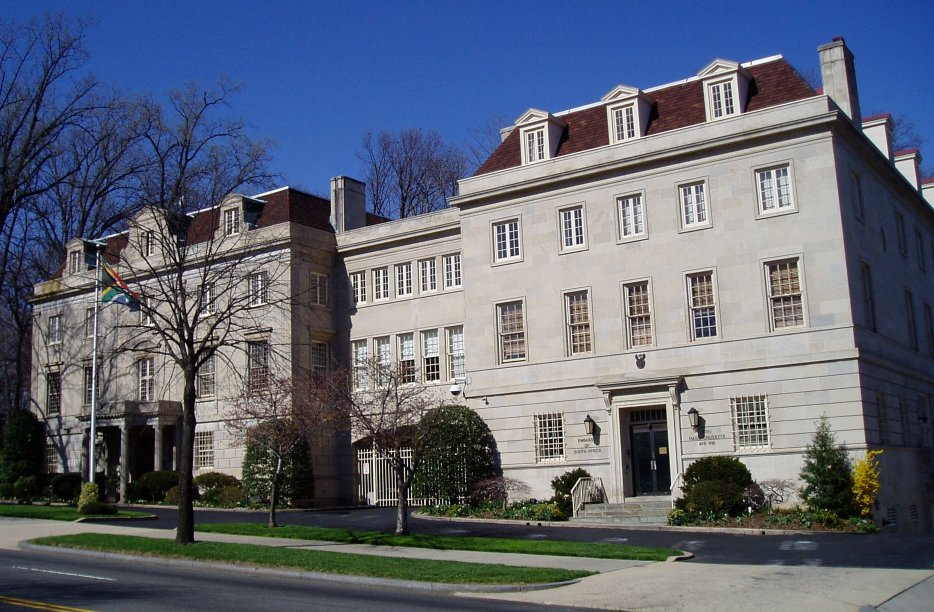
South African Embassy

#	Picture	Name	Term of office	Prime Minister/State President(s)/President(s) served under	Ref
1		Harry Thomson Andrews	1 March 1949- 26 September 1949	Daniel François Malan (NP)	
2		Gerhardus Petrus Jooste	26 September 1949- 26 August 1954	Daniel François Malan (NP)	
3		John Edward Holloway	26 August 1954- 7 August 1956	Johannes Gerhardus Strijdom (NP)	
4		Wentzel Christoffel du Plessis	7 August 1956- 13 September 1960	Johannes Gerhardus Strijdom (NP); Hendrik Verwoerd (NP)	
5		Willem Christiaan Naude	13 September 1960- 9 February 1965	Hendrik Verwoerd (NP)	
6		Harald Langmead Taylor Taswell	9 February 1965- 18 August 1971	B. J. Vorster (NP)	
7		Johan Samuel Frederick Botha	18 August 1971- 30 July 1975	B. J. Vorster (NP)	
8		Pik Botha	30 July 1975- 11 May 1977	B. J. Vorster (NP)	
9		Donald Bell Sole	11 May 1977- 4 June 1982	Pieter Willem Botha (NP)	
10		Bernardus Gerhardus Fourie	4 June 1982- 23 September 1985	Pieter Willem Botha (NP)	
11		Johannes Albertus Hermanus Beukes	23 September 1985- 1 May 1987	Pieter Willem Botha (NP)	
12		Piet Koornhof	1 May 1987- 6 March 1991	Pieter Willem Botha (NP); Frederik Willem de Klerk (NP)	
13		Harry Schwarz	6 March 1991- 12 January 1995	Frederik Willem de Klerk (NP); Nelson Mandela (ANC)	
14		Franklin A. Sonn	12 January 1995- 8 March 1999	Nelson Mandela (ANC)	
15		Sheila Sisulu	8 March 1999- 28 August 2003	Thabo Mbeki (ANC)	
16	Barbara Masekela portrait	Barbara Masekela	28 August 2003- 14 August 2007	Thabo Mbeki (ANC)	
17		Welile Nhlapo	14 August 2007- 4 August 2010	Kgalema Motlanthe (ANC)	
17		Welile Nhlapo	14 August 2007- 4 August 2010	Jacob Zuma (ANC)	
18		Ebrahim Rasool	4 August 2010- 23 February 2015	Jacob Zuma (ANC)	
19		M. J. Mahlangu	23 February 2015 – March 2020	Jacob Zuma (ANC)	
20		Nomaindia Mfeketo	March 2020 – August 2023	Cyril Ramaphosa (ANC)	
21		Ndumiso Ntshinga	5 November 2023 – January 20, 2025	Cyril Ramaphosa (ANC)	
22		Ebrahim Rasool	January 2025 – March 2025	Cyril Ramaphosa (ANC)	
23		Roelf Meyer	Nominated 14 April 2026	Cyril Ramaphosa (ANC)	

== See also ==
- Embassy of South Africa in Washington, D.C.
