= Piet Welgemoed =

South African politician

Member of the National Assembly
- In office 1994–1996

Minister of Post and Telecommunications
- In office 1992–1994

Minister of Transport
- In office 1991–1994
- President: F. W. de Klerk
- Succeeded by: Mac Maharaj

Personal details
- Born: Peter Johannes Welgemoed
- Citizenship: South Africa
- Party: National Party

Peter Johannes "Piet" Welgemoed is a South African politician and businessman who was Minister of Transport from 1991 to 1994 under President F. W. de Klerk. He represented the National Party in the House of Assembly and National Assembly until 1996, when he resigned to pursue a career in business.

== Education and early career ==
Welgemoed completed a doctorate in transport economics at Rand Afrikaans University in 1971. From 1974, he was a professor in the department of transportation economics at the university, where he was also director of the Research Centre for Physical Distribution and Transportation Studies.

Welgemoed succeeded Piet Koornhof as the NP's representative in the Primrose constituency in the House of Assembly. Formerly a deputy minister, he was appointed to de Klerk's cabinet in April 1991, when he was named as Minister of Transport. Responsibility for Post and Telecommunications was added to his portfolio in 1992.

== Post-apartheid career ==
In the 1994 general election, Welgemoed was elected to represent the NP in the new multi-racial National Assembly. He was also appointed as the party's shadow minister for transport. However, in 1996, he resigned from Parliament in order to take up what he described as an "exceptional private sector opportunity".

In his subsequent corporate career, Welgemoed's position included the executive chairmanship of the Board of Market Power in South America, which he held from 1998; he was also a long-serving director at Comair until he resigned from the board in December 2019.
