= Sundays River (House of Assembly of South Africa constituency) =

South African constituency, 1910–1994

- Sondagsrivier
- Former constituency for the South African House of Assembly
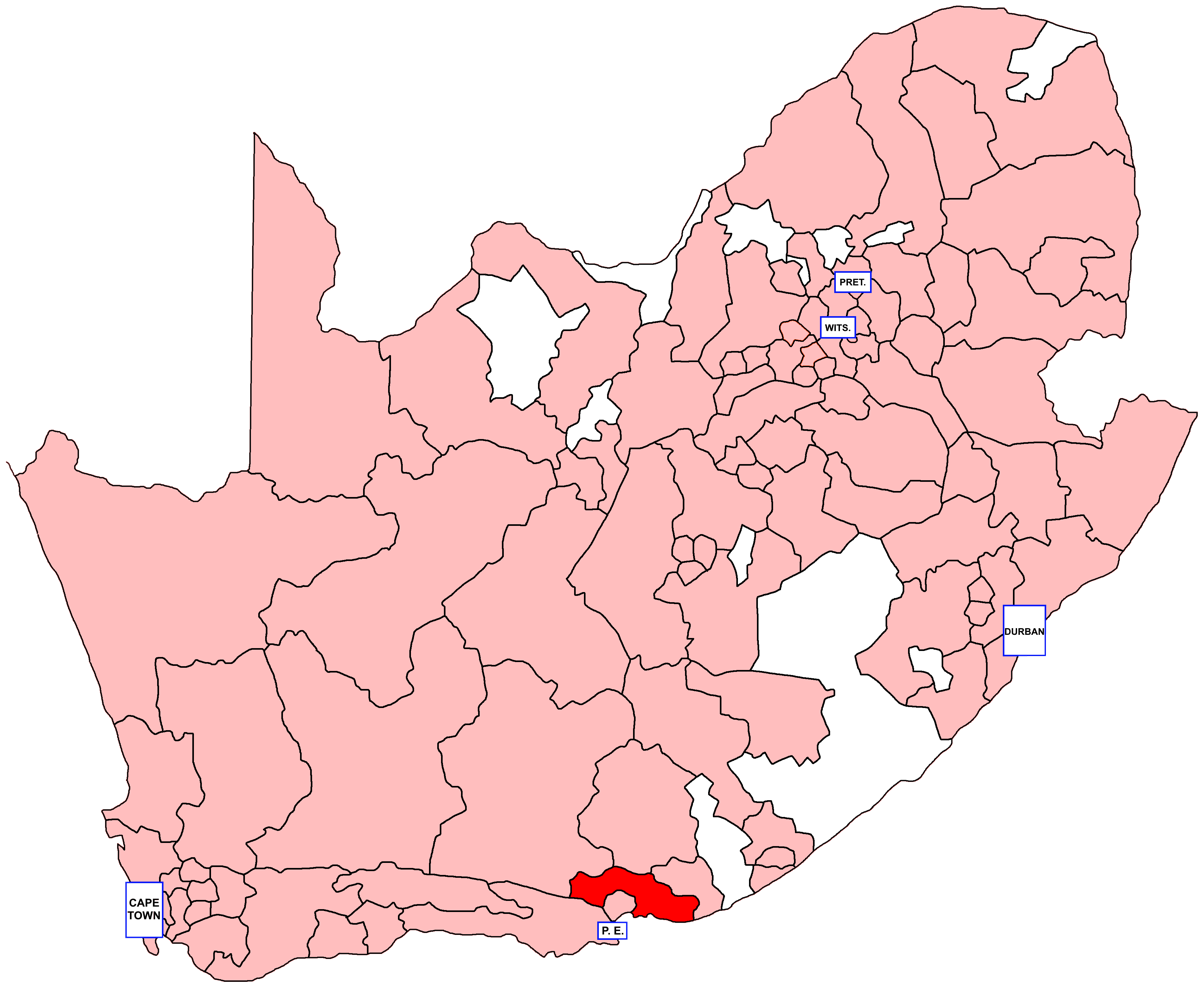
- Location of Sundays River within South Africa (1981)
- District: Sundays River
- Province: Western Cape

Former constituency
- Created: 1910
- Abolished: 1994
- Number of members: 1
- Replaced by: Western Cape

Sundays River was a constituency in the Western Cape of South Africa, which existed from 1910 to 1994. Named for the Sundays River, throughout its existence it elected one member to the House of Assembly.

== Members ==
Election	Parliament	Member	Party	Ref.
1989	21st South African Parliament	Tertius Delport	NP	
