= Gene Louw =

South African politician (1931–2015)

Eugene Louw

Speaker of the House of Assembly of South Africa
- In office 1991–1994
- President: FW de Klerk
- Preceded by: Louis le Grange
- Succeeded by: Frene Ginwala

Minister of Defence
- In office May 1992 – 30 March 1993
- Preceded by: Roelf Meyer
- Succeeded by: Kobie Coetsee

Minister of Public Works
- In office 1992–1993
- Preceded by: Leon Wessels
- Succeeded by: Louis Shill

Minister of Home Affairs
- In office 1989–1992
- Preceded by: Stoffel Botha
- Succeeded by: Louis Pienaar

Minister of Education
- In office 1989–1990
- Preceded by: Gerrit Viljoen
- Succeeded by: Louis Pienaar

Personal details
- Born: Eugene Louw; 15 July 1931
- Died: 12 October 2015 (aged 84)
- Party: National Party (South Africa)

Eugene Louw (15 July 1931 – 12 October 2015) was a South African politician, member of the National Party, MP for Durbanville and Paarl, who was administrator for Cape Province (1979–1989), Minister of Home Affairs (1989–1992), National Education (1989–1990), Public Works (1992–1993) and Defence (1992–1993) in the F.W. de Klerk government.

Louw retired from political life in 1994 to return to his work as a lawyer in Durbanville.

Political offices
Preceded by Roelf Meyer	Minister of Defence; 1992–1993	Succeeded by Kobie Coetsee
Preceded by Leon Wessels	Minister of Public Works; 1992–1993	Succeeded by Louis Shill
Preceded by Stoffel Botha	Minister of Home Affairs; 1989–1992	Succeeded by Louis Pienaar
Preceded by Gerrit Viljoen	Minister of Education; 1989–1990	Succeeded by Louis Pienaar
