= Magnus Malan =

South African military figure and politician (1930-2011)

General Magnus Malan SSA OMSG SD SM MP
- Malan c. 1990

Minister of Defence
- In office 1980–1991
- Prime Minister: P. W. Botha and F. W. de Klerk
- Preceded by: P. W. Botha
- Succeeded by: Roelf Meyer

Personal details
- Born: Magnus André de Merindol Malan; 30 January 1930 Pretoria, Transvaal, South Africa
- Died: 18 July 2011 (aged 81) Pretoria, Gauteng, South Africa
- Party: National
- Spouse: Magrietha Johanna van der Walt (m. 1962)
- Education: University of Pretoria
- Occupation: Politician and military chief
- Civilian awards: Order for Meritorious Service OMSG

Military service
- Allegiance: South Africa
- Branch/service: South African Army; South African Navy
- Years of service: 1950–1980
- Rank: General
- Commands: Chief of the South African Defence Force; Chief of the Army; Western Province Command; South African Military Academy
- Battles/wars: Operation Savannah
- Military awards: Star of South Africa SSAG Southern Cross Decoration SD Southern Cross Medal SM Pro Patria Medal (South Africa) Good Service Medal Permanent Force Good Service Medal

General Magnus André de Mérindol Malan SSA, OMSG, SD, SM, MP (30 January 1930 – 18 July 2011) was a South African military figure and politician during the last years of apartheid in South Africa. He served as Minister of Defence in the cabinet of President P. W. Botha, Chief of the South African Defence Force (SADF), and Chief of the South African Army. Rising quickly through the lower ranks, he was appointed to strategic command positions. His tenure as chief of the defence force saw it increase in size, efficiency and capabilities.

As P.W. Botha's cabinet minister, he posited a total communist onslaught, for which an encompassing national strategy was devised. This entailed placing policing, intelligence and aspects of civic affairs under control of generals. The ANC and SWAPO were branded as terrorist organizations, while splinter groups (UNITA and RENAMO) were bolstered in neighbouring and Frontline States. Cross-border raids targeted suspected bases of insurgents or activists, while at home the army entered townships from 1984 onwards to stifle unrest. Elements in the Inkatha Freedom Party were used as a proxy force, and rogue soldiers and policemen in the CCB assassinated opponents.

== Personal life ==
Malan's father Avril Ire de Merindol was a professor of biochemistry at the University of Pretoria and later a member of parliament (1948–1966) and Deputy Speaker and Chairman of Committees (1961–1966) of the House of Assembly. He started his high school education at the Afrikaanse Hoër Seunskool but later moved to Dr Danie Craven’s Physical Education Brigade in Kimberley, where he completed his matriculation. He wanted to join the South African armed forces immediately after his matriculation, but his father advised him first to complete his university studies. As a result of this advice, Malan enrolled at the University of Stellenbosch in 1949 to study for a Bachelor of Commerce degree. However, he later abandoned his studies in Stellenbosch and went to University of Pretoria, where he enrolled for a BSc Mil. degree. He graduated in 1953.

In 1962, Malan married Magrietha Johanna van der Walt; the couple had two sons and one daughter.

He is the elder brother of Springbok rugby player Avril Malan.

== Military career ==
At the end of 1949, the first military degree course for officers was advertised and Malan joined the Permanent Force as a cadet, going on to complete his BSc Mil at the University of Pretoria in 1953.

Malan was commissioned in the Navy and served in the Marines based on Robben Island. When they were disbanded, he was transferred back into the Army as a lieutenant.

Malan was earmarked for high office from early on in his military career; one of the many courses he attended was the Regular Command and General Staff Officers Course at Fort Leavenworth, Kansas in the United States of America from 1962 to 1963. During this time he was introduced to President J.F. Kennedy and spent time doing manoeuvres with an American armoured division. In 1967, at age 36, while stationed in Windhoek and holding the rank of colonel, Malan joined the secretive Broederbond organization. He went on to serve as commanding officer of various formations, including Western Province Command, South West Africa Command, and the South African Military Academy.

In 1973, Malan was appointed as Chief of the South African Army and three years later as Chief of the South African Defence Force (SADF). As Chief of the SADF he implemented many administrative changes that earned him great admiration in military circles. During this period he became very close to P.W. Botha, the then Minister of Defence and later Prime Minister and State President of South Africa.

=== Awards and decorations ===
Malan was awarded the following awards and decorations:

- Star of South Africa (Gold) (SSAG)
- Order for Meritorious Service (Gold) (OMSG)
- Southern Cross Decoration (SD)
- Southern Cross Medal (1952) (SM)
- Pro Patria Medal (South Africa) (with Cunene Clasp) (Note: Only the Cunene clasp was awarded, to members who served in Angola during Operation Savannah in 1975 and 1976. Recipients of the clasp wear a button, with the letter C encircled by a wreath, on the ribbon bar.)
- Good Service Medal (Gold (30 Years))
- Good Service Medal (Silver (20 Years))
- Permanent Force Good Service Medal

== Political career ==
In October 1980, Botha appointed Malan defence minister in the National Party government, a post he held until 1991. As a result of this appointment, he joined the National Party and became Member of Parliament for Modderfontein. He was also elected to be a member of the Executive Council of the National Party.

During Malan's tenure in parliament as defence minister, his greatest opposition came from MPs of the Progressive Federal Party such as Harry Schwarz and Philip Myburgh, who both served as shadow defence ministers at various points during the 1980s.

In July 1991, following a scandal involving secret government funding to the Inkatha Freedom Party and other opponents of the African National Congress, President F. W. de Klerk removed Malan from his influential post of defence minister and appointed him as the minister for water affairs and forestry.

The strike craft SAS Magnus Malan of the South African Navy was named after him prior to the change of government in 1994.

== Later life ==
On 2 November 1995, Malan was charged together with 19 other former senior military officers for murdering 13 people (including seven children) in the KwaMakhutha massacre in 1987. The murders were said to have been part of a conspiracy to create war between the African National Congress (ANC) and the Zulu Inkatha Freedom Party (IFP), and maintaining white minority rule. The charges related to an attack in January 1987 on the home of Victor Ntuli, an ANC activist, in KwaMakhutha township near Durban in KwaZulu-Natal.

Malan and the other accused were bailed and ordered to appear in court again on 1 December 1995. A seven-month trial then ensued and brought hostility between black and white South Africans to the fore once again. All the accused were eventually acquitted. President Mandela called on South Africans to respect the verdict. Nonetheless in South Africa, the Malan trial has come to be seen by some as a failure of the legal process.

Malan also had to appear before the Truth and Reconciliation Commission.

On 26 January 2007, he was interviewed by shortwave/Internet talk radio show The Right Perspective. It is believed to be one of the very few, if not the only, interviews Malan gave outside of South Africa. In 2006, he published an autobiography titled My Life With the SA Defence Force.

Malan died at his home in Pretoria on 18 July 2011. He was survived by his wife, 3 children and 9 grandchildren.

== Controversy ==
In August 2018, a book by a former apartheid-era policeman Mark Minnie and journalist Chris Steyn alleged that Malan had been involved in a paedophilia ring in the 1980s. The book, The Lost Boys of Bird Island contains testimony that Malan used his position as Defence Minister to kidnap and ferry young Coloured boys to an island off the coast of South Africa by helicopter, under the pretext of going on a fishing trip. They were then allegedly raped and otherwise sexually abused by Malan and other members of the ring who purportedly included local businessman Dave Allen, former minister of environmental affairs John Wiley, and at least one other government minister who is not named but is still alive. The book, however, contained sufficient information for readers to conclude that former finance minister, Barend du Plessis, was the implicated living minister.

Dave Allen was later arrested for paedophilia but was found dead from an apparent suicide before he was due to appear in court. Wiley was found dead just weeks later. Mark Minnie, one of the authors of Lost Boys was found dead in August 2018.

The allegations were met with scepticism and rejected by those who were intimately acquainted with Malan, including his surviving family. In a review by investigative journalist Jacques Pauw, Minnie is described as "a sloppy, negligent and careless policeman". Pauw criticised the book's authors, especially Minnie, for the quality of the investigation and research supporting the allegations and Steyn for having a conflict of interest; and asserted that this has had a negative impact on the victims getting justice. In April 2019, a major South African newspaper, Rapport, published an apology for their reporting based on the book. The newspaper apologised to the surviving relatives of Malan as new evidence had emerged that cast doubt on the contents of the book and the key allegations were based on unsubstantiated hearsay. On the morning of 3 March 2020, Johan Victor Attorneys, who represented Barend du Plessis and the surviving families of Malan and Wiley, released a press statement revealing that, after a forensic investigation was conducted into the allegations made in the book, major concessions and a lack of concrete evidence implicating any of the ministers had been found. The publishers of The Lost Boys of Bird Island, Tafelberg, a subsidiary of NB Publishers, retracted the book from the market in both its hard copy and e-book form later on the same afternoon. They issued a statement in which an apology was extended to Barend du Plessis, but not to any other person identified in the book.

== Footnotes ==
Government offices
Preceded by Gert Kotzé	Minister of Water Affairs and Forestry; 1991 – 1993	Succeeded by Kader Asmal
Preceded by Pieter Willem Botha	Minister of Defence; 1980–1991	Succeeded by Roelf Meyer
Military offices
Preceded by Hugo Biermann	Chief of the South African Defence Force; 1976–1980	Succeeded by Constand Viljoen
Preceded by Willem Louw	Chief of the South African Army; 1973–1976	Succeeded by Constand Viljoen
Preceded by William "Bill" Matthews	Chief of Staff Army; 1972–1973	Succeeded by Discontinued
Preceded by Jan Fourie	Officer Commanding Western Province Command; 1971–1972	Succeeded by Helm Roos
Preceded by Pieter de Vos	Officer Commanding South African Military Academy; 1967–1971	Succeeded by Johan Potgieter
Preceded by Chockie Coetser	Officer Commanding South West Africa Command; 1966–1967	Succeeded by Andre van Deventer
