= Minister of Transport (South Africa) =

Minister in the Cabinet of South Africa

South Africa Minister of Transport
- List: 10 other official names: Minister van Vervoer (Afrikaans); uNgqongqotjhe wezokuThutha (Southern Ndebele); UMphathiswa wezoThutho (Xhosa); uNgqongqoshe Wezokuthutha (Zulu); Indvuna Yetekutfutsa (Swazi); Tona ya Dinamelwa (Northern Sotho); Letona la Dipalangwang (Sotho); Tona la Dipalangwa (Tswana); Holobye ya Vutleketli (Tsonga); Minisiṱa wa Vhuendi (Venda)
- Flag of South Africa

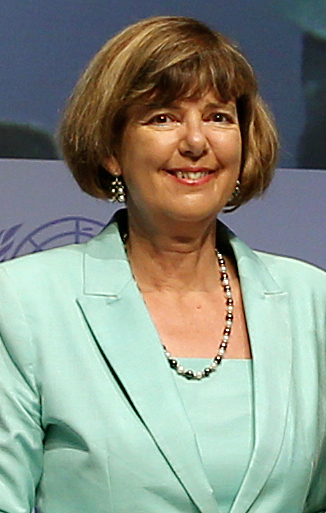
- Incumbent; Barbara Creecy since 30 June 2024
- Department of Transport
- Style: The Honourable
- Appointer: Cyril Ramaphosa
- Inaugural holder: George Bartlett
- Formation: 16 August 1989
- Deputy: Mkhuleko Hlengwa
- Salary: R1,724,897
- Website: Department of Transport

The minister of transport is a minister of the Cabinet of South Africa who is responsible for overseeing the Department of Transport.

== List of ministers of transport (since 1989) ==
Name	Portrait	Term	Party	President
George Bartlett		1989 – 1991	NP	F. W. de Klerk (I)
Piet Welgemoed		1991 – 1994	NP	F. W. de Klerk (I)
Mac Maharaj		11 May 1994 – 1999	ANC	Nelson Mandela (I)
Dullah Omar		1999 – 2004	ANC	Thabo Mbeki (I)
Jeff Radebe		29 April 2004 – 10 May 2009	ANC	Thabo Mbeki (II); Kgalema Motlanthe (I)
S'bu Ndebele		11 May 2009 – 12 June 2012	ANC	Jacob Zuma (I)
Ben Martins		12 June 2012 – 9 July 2013	ANC	Jacob Zuma (I)
Dipuo Peters		10 July 2013 – 30 March 2017	ANC	Jacob Zuma (I)(II)
Joe Maswanganyi		31 March 2017 – 28 February 2018	ANC	Jacob Zuma (II)
Blade Nzimande		28 February 2018 – 29 May 2019	ANC	Cyril Ramaphosa (I)
Fikile Mbalula		30 May 2019 – 6 March 2023	ANC	Cyril Ramaphosa (II)
Sindisiwe Chikunga		7 March 2023 — 30 June 2024	ANC	Cyril Ramaphosa (II)
Barbara Creecy		30 June 2024 — Present	ANC	Cyril Ramaphosa (III)
