= Sam de Beer =

South African politician (born 1944)

Member of the National Assembly
- In office June 1999 – February 2001
- In office May 1994 – August 1998

Member of the House of Assembly

Assembly Member for Geduld
- In office 1974–1994

Personal details
- Born: Samuel Johannes de Beer; 19 August 1944 (age 82) Johannesburg, Transvaal; University of South Africa
- Party: African National Congress (since 2001)
- Other political affiliations: United Democratic Movement (1998–2001); New National Party (1997–98); National Party (until 1997)
- Education: University of Pretoria

Samuel Johannes de Beer (born 19 August 1944) is a South African politician and former Christian minister who served in Parliament from 1974 to 2001, excepting a brief hiatus from 1998 to 1999. He subsequently joined the Gauteng Provincial Legislature.

A former Dutch Reformed Church minister, de Beer entered politics during apartheid through the National Party (NP), which he represented in the House of Assembly from 1974 to 1994, serving the Geduld constituency. During that time, from 1991, he also served as Minister for Education and Training under President F. W. de Klerk. After South Africa's democratic transition, he represented the NP in the National Assembly from 1994 to 1998 and as NP leader in Gauteng from 1997 to 1998.

In August 1998, de Beer defected to the United Democratic Movement (UDM), which he went on to represent in the National Assembly from 1999 to 2001. In February 2001, he defected for a second time, leaving the UDM for the African National Congress (ANC). In March 2001, he joined the Gauteng Provincial Legislature under the ANC banner.

== Early life and career ==
De Beer was born on 19 August 1944 in Johannesburg in the former Transvaal. He completed two undergraduate degrees, one in theology, from the University of Pretoria, where he was a member of the national executive of the Afrikaanse Studentebond from 1965 to 1967. After graduating, he was a minister in the Dutch Reformed Church, first in Magaliesburg and then in Springs.

In 1974, de Beer was elected to a National Party (NP) seat in the House of Assembly, representing the Transvaal's Geduld constituency. He served in Parliament for the next two decades. After chairing the East Rand branch of the NP from 1983 to 1984, he was Deputy Minister of Education and Development Aid from 1984 to 1989. In 1991, President F. W. de Klerk appointed him to the cabinet as Minister for Education and Training, a portfolio which included administration of the Bantu education system.

== Post-apartheid political career ==
The 1994 general election was held under universal suffrage and de Beer was elected to represent the NP in the new multi-racial National Assembly. During the legislative term that followed, in June 1997, he was elected to succeed Roelf Meyer as leader of the NP's Gauteng provincial branch, narrowly defeating Fanus Schoeman. When de Klerk resigned as the party's national leader weeks later, de Beer ran to succeed him in a contest against Danie Schutte and Marthinus van Schalkwyk; van Schalkwyk prevailed, but de Beer retained his position as Gauteng leader.

In August 1998, de Beer resigned as NP provincial leader and as a Member of Parliament in order to defect from the NP (by then restyled as the New National Party) to the United Democratic Movement (UDM). He appeared on the UDM's party list in the 1999 general election and was returned to a seat in the National Assembly. However, he again failed to complete his term in the seat: in February 2001, he announced that he had resigned from the UDM, and would therefore lose his parliamentary seat. He said:

[The] optimistic expectations that I had of the UDM's potential of achieving its goals, as expressed in its election manifesto, have faded away. Under these circumstances it is only fair to make room for somebody who can still work with enthusiasm for the party. I see the last two and a half years involvement in establishing a new, young party – with its main aim to bring all South Africans together in one party – as a privilege and a great experience.

He also accused Roelf Meyer, the UDM's co-founder and his former NP colleague, of having abandoned the UDM, saying "It could have been a totally different story if Roelf had not done that". De Beer subsequently joined the governing African National Congress (ANC), and in mid-March he was sworn in to an ANC seat in the Gauteng Provincial Legislature. He was re-elected to a full term in the provincial legislature in the 2004 general election.
