= William Wiley (cricketer) =

South African cricketer

Personal information
- Full name: William Gordon Antony Wiley
- Born: 14 November 1931; St James, Cape Province, South Africa
- Died: 7 December 1999 (aged 68); Harare, Mashonaland, Zimbabwe
- Batting: Right-handed
- Bowling: Leg break googly
- Relatives: John Wiley (brother)

Domestic team information
- Years: Team
- 1952: Oxford University
- 1952: Oxfordshire
- 1952/53–1953/54: Western Province

Career statistics
Competition	First-class
Matches	16
Runs scored	666
Batting average	22.96
100s/50s	1/4
Top score	100
Balls bowled	6
Wickets	0
Bowling average	–
5 wickets in innings	–
10 wickets in match	–
Best bowling	–
Catches/stumpings	14/–
- Source: Cricinfo, 25 June 2019

William Gordon Antony Wiley (14 November 1931 – 7 December 1999) was a South African first-class cricketer.

Wiley was born at St James in Cape Town. He later travelled to England to study at Lincoln College, Oxford. While at Oxford he made his debut in first-class cricket for Oxford University against Gloucestershire at Oxford in 1952. He made twelve first-class appearances for Oxford in 1952, scoring 580 runs at an average of 27.61, with a high score of 100. This score, which was his only first-class century, came against Sussex at Worthing. During the 1952 season, he also played minor counties cricket for Oxfordshire, making a single appearance against Berkshire in the Minor Counties Championship. Returning to South Africa, Wiley made four first-class appearances for Western Province in the 1952/53 and 1953/54 seasons. He later emigrated to Zimbabwe, where he died at Harare in December 1999. His brother was the cricketer and politician John Wiley.
