= Sunnyside (House of Assembly of South Africa constituency) =

South African constituency, 1910–1994

- Sunnyside
- Former constituency for the South African House of Assembly
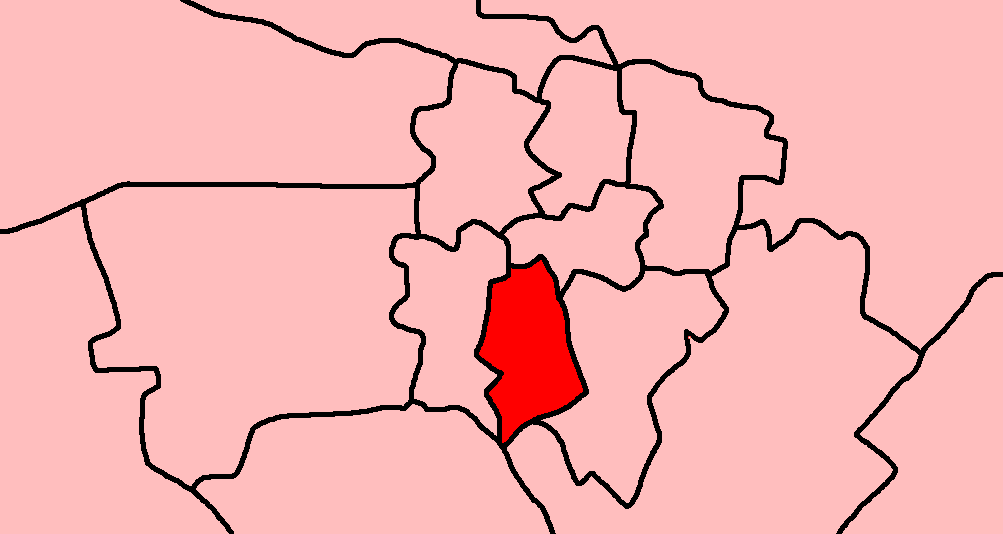
- Location of Sunnyside within Pretoria (1981)
- Province: Transvaal
- Major settlements: Sunnyside

Former constituency
- Created: 1910
- Abolished: 1994
- Number of members: 1
- Replaced by: North West

Sunnyside was a constituency in the Transvaal Province of South Africa, which existed from 1910 to 1994. Named for the Pretoria suburb of Sunnyside, throughout its existence it elected one member to the House of Assembly.

== Members ==
Election	Parliament	Member	Party	Ref.
1989	21st South African Parliament	Fanus Schoeman	NP	
