= Stoffel Botha =

South African politician (1929–1998)

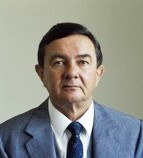

Minister of Home Affairs
- In office 1984–1989
- President: P. W. Botha

Personal details
- Born: Jan Christoffel Greyling Botha; 1929
- Died: 1998 (aged 68–69)
- Party: National Party
- Occupation: Lawyer

Jan Christoffel Greyling "Stoffel" Botha (1929–1998) was a South African lawyer and politician. He was a member of the National Party, served as member of Parliament (elected representative of the Eshowe constituency in 1974), administrator of Natal Province (1979–1984), Minister of Home Affairs (1985–1989) in the P.W. Botha government.

A lawyer by profession, he began his professional career in Johannesburg before starting a political career.

He was appointed administrator of the Natal province in 1979. He was the provincial head of the National Party when State President P.W. Botha named him to the government in 1984 first as Minister of Education, then as Minister of Home Affairs and later the Post and Telecommunications portfolio was added to his duties.

In 1989, he announced his retirement from political life for health reasons and, despite bypass surgery, he died of heart failure at age 69 in 1998.

Political offices
Preceded by Wynand Havemann	Administrator of Natal Province; 1979–1984	Succeeded by Radclyffe Cadman
Preceded by Frederik de Klerk	Minister of Home Affairs; 1985-1989	Succeeded by Gene Louw
