= Tobie Meyer =

South African politician

Deputy Minister of Land Affairs
- In office 11 May 1994 – 1996
- President: Nelson Mandela
- Minister: Derek Hanekom

Member of the National Assembly
- In office 9 May 1994 – 1996

Deputy Minister of Agriculture and Land Affairs
- In office 1991–1994
- President: F. W. de Klerk
- Minister: Kraai van Niekerk

Member of the House of Assembly

Assembly Member for Cradock
- In office 1987–1994

Personal details
- Born: Anthon Tobias Meyer
- Citizenship: South Africa
- Party: National Party
- Relations: Roelf Meyer (brother)

Anthon Tobias "Tobie" Meyer is a South African politician who was Deputy Minister of Land Affairs from 1991 to 1996. He represented the National Party (NP) in Parliament from 1987 until 1996, when he resigned from politics to concentrate on his commercial farming interests.

== Apartheid-era career ==
The elder brother of prominent NP politician Roelf Meyer, Meyer rose to prominence as secretary and then chairperson of the NP's branch in Cradock in the Cape Province, an area that became famous in 1985 for the deaths of the Cradock Four. He was also a director at Volkskas Bank and a member of the control board of the South African Broadcasting Corporation, and since 1956 he had managed farming interests in Ficksburg, Humansdorp, and Tsitsikamma.

In the 1987 general election, he was elected to represent the NP in the all-white House of Assembly as MP for Cradock. In addition, in March 1991, President F. W. de Klerk appointed him as Deputy Minister of Agriculture, a newly created position in which he deputised Kraai van Niekerk. Responsibility for land affairs was added to his portfolio later in 1991.

== Post-apartheid career ==
In South Africa's first post-apartheid elections in 1994, Meyer was elected to continue in Parliament, now in the multi-racial National Assembly. President Nelson Mandela also retained him as a deputy minister in the new Government of National Unity, appointing him as Deputy Minister of Land Affairs. In early 1996, Meyer announced that he was resigning from politics in order to manage his farming business full time.
