= Sanusha Naidu =

South African academic

Sanusha Naidu is a scholar of foreign policy, especially focusing on Sino-African relations. She is a senior research fellow at the Institute for Global Dialogue, an independent South African think tank associated with the University of South Africa, and has a master's degree in International Relations from Staffordshire University in England.

== Books ==
- Crouching Tiger, Hidden Dragon?: Africa and China (edited with Kweku Ampiah, 2008)
- China in Africa (with Ian Taylor, Margaret C. Lee and Henning Melber, 2007)
- Chinese and African Perspectives on China in Africa (edited with Axel Narneit-Sievers and Stephen Marks, 2009)
