= Tertius Delport =

South African academic, lawyer and politician (1939–2023)

Member of the National Assembly of South Africa
- In office 1999–2009

Member of the Executive Council of the Eastern Cape for Agriculture and Transport
- In office 1994–1997

Member of the Eastern Cape Provincial Legislature
- In office 1994–1998

Minister of Local Government
- In office 1992–1994
- President: F. W. de Klerk
- Preceded by: Leon Wessels
- Succeeded by: Office abolished

Deputy Minister of Provincial Affairs and Constitutional Development
- In office 1990–1992

Member of the House of Assembly of South Africa for Sundays River
- In office 1987–1994

Personal details
- Born: Tertius Jacobus Delport; 16 October 1939 Humansdorp, Cape Province, South Africa
- Died: 21 November 2023 (aged 84) Gqeberha, Eastern Cape, South Africa
- Party: Democratic Alliance (from 2000)
- Other political affiliations: Democratic Party (1998–2003); New National Party (1997–1998); National Party (1987–1997)
- Children: 3
- Education: Stellenbosch University (BA, LLB); University of Port Elizabeth (LLD)

Jacobus Tertius Delport (16 October 1939 – 21 November 2023) was a South African academic, lawyer, and politician.

Delport was elected a member of Parliament for the National Party in 1987. In 1990, he joined the government as Deputy Minister of Provincial Affairs and Constitutional Development before he was appointed Minister of Local Government in 1992. Delport was the government's chief spokesperson during the CODESA. In the 1994 elections, he was elected to the Eastern Cape Provincial Legislature where he was afterwards appointed to serve as the member of the Executive Council for Agriculture and Transport from 1994 through 1997. Delport defected to the Democratic Party in 1998 and was elected back to Parliament in 1999. He was a founding member of the Democratic Party's successor party, the Democratic Alliance, in 2000. Delport retired from politics in 2009.

== Early life and education ==
Delport was born into an Afrikaner family on 16 October 1939 in Humansdorp in the Union of South Africa's Cape Province. He would go on to study at Stellenbosch University for a Bachelor of Arts and then a Bachelor of Laws. While at university, he resided in the university's Dagbreek Men's residence, of which he served as primarius. He was chairperson of the university's Student Representative Council (SRC), chairperson of the Intervarsity Committee, and chairperson of the Choir Festival Committee. He earned full university colours.

Delport was also vice president and president of the Afrikaanse Studentebond (English: Afrikaans Students' Union). Delport was later conferred with a Doctor of Laws from the University of Port Elizabeth.

== Law and academic career ==
Delport was a state advocate between 1963 and 1964 before working as an advocate and attorney between 1965 and 1968. He was a senior lecturer in law at the University of Port Elizabeth from 1969 to 1974. He became a professor of law at the university in 1975 and the dean of the university's law faculty the following year.

Delport also served on the National Housing Commission from 1975 until 1987, the South African Law Commission between 1980 and 1987, and the Commission for the Small Claims Court from 1984 until 1987.

== Political career ==
In the 1987 election, Delport was elected to the House of Assembly for Sundays River, a constituency covering the northern suburbs of Port Elizabeth as a member of the National Party. In 1990, he was appointed Deputy Minister of Provincial Affairs and Constitutional Development by president F.W. de Klerk. Delport was the government's chief spokesperson as well as a negotiator at the Convention for a Democratic South Africa which brought an end to the apartheid system and white minority rule in South Africa. Delport was involved in a controversy that brought CODESA to a deadlock later on. In 1992, he was appointed Minister of Local Government by De Klerk.

In the first elections held under universal suffrage in South Africa in 1994, Delport was elected to the newly established Eastern Cape Provincial Legislature for the NP. He was named to the province's Executive Council as the Member of the Executive Council responsible for Agriculture and Transport. Delport was also the leader of the National Party in the Eastern Cape. He resigned from the executive council in 1997 and defected to the liberal Democratic Party in 1998. While a speaking at a DP by-election campaign meeting in May 1998, Delport said that the National Party had failed as an opposition party to the ruling African National Congress. During the following year's election, Delport was elected to the National Assembly of South Africa for the DP.

In June 2000, the Democratic Alliance was formed through a merger of the DP and the New National Party, the successor party to the National Party. Delport was appointed to the party's Federal Council and the Federal Legal Commission. He was also named the party's spokesperson for constitutional affairs. In 2007, he stood for leader of the DA's caucus in the National Assembly but was defeated by fellow Afrikaner MP Sandra Botha.

In February 2009, Delport called for the reinstatement of suspended National Director of Public Prosecutions Vusi Pikoli. Delport did not stand for re-election to the National Assembly at that year's general election and retired from politics.

== Personal life and death ==
Delport was married to Ansie and they had three children together.

Delport died in Gqeberha on 21 November 2023, aged 84. DA Eastern Cape provincial leader Andrew Whitfield paid tribute to him.
