= St James, Cape Town =

Seaside suburb of South Africa

St James
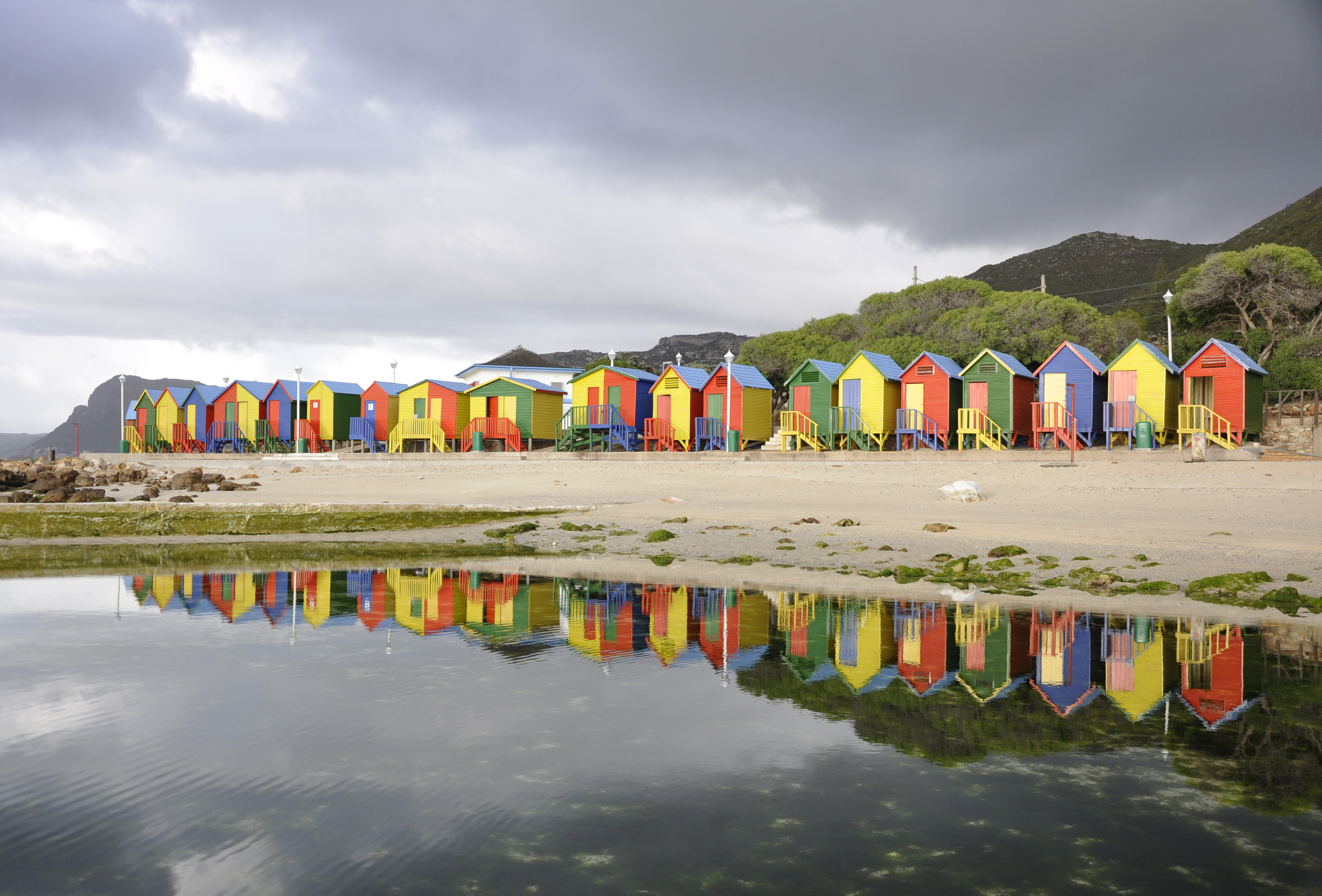
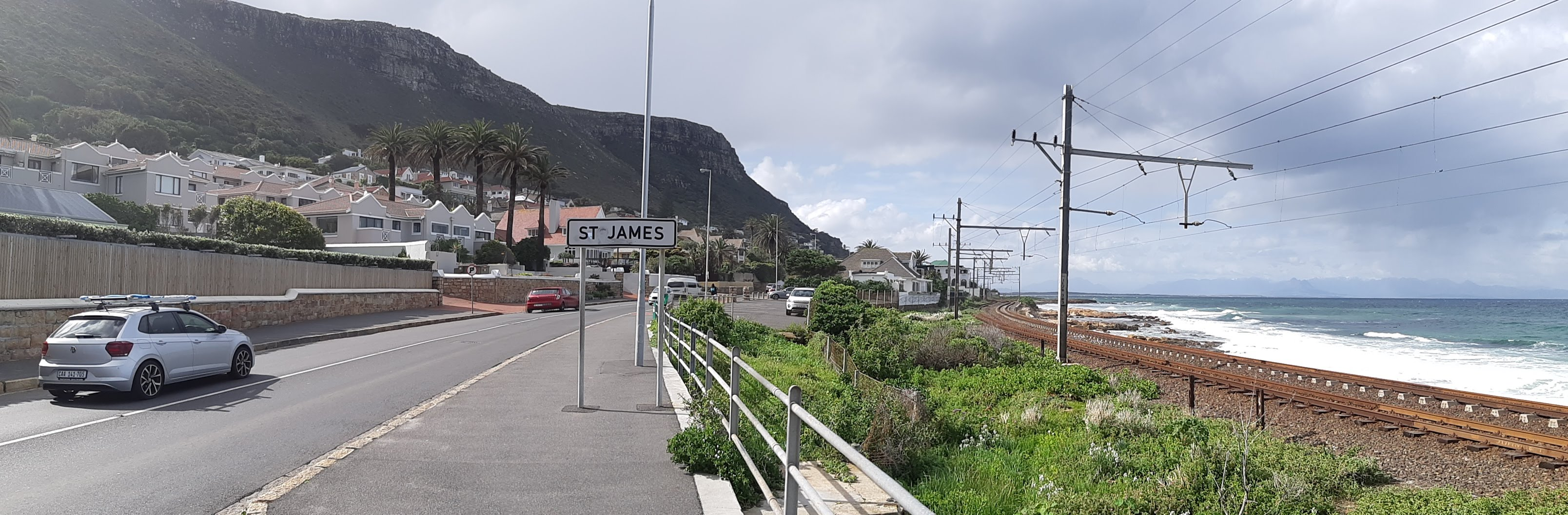
- Beach huts in St James St James viewed from Kalk Bay

- Location within Western Cape Location within South Africa
- Coordinates: 34°07′08″S 18°27′33″E
- Country: South Africa
- Province: Western Cape
- Municipality: City of Cape Town
- Main Place: Muizenberg

Area
  - Total: 0.37 km^{2} (0.14 sq mi)

Population (2011)
  - Total: 491
  - Density: 1,300/km^{2} (3,400/sq mi)

Racial makeup (2011)
  - Black African: 7.3%
  - Coloured: 6.7%
  - White: 79.6%
  - Other: 6.3%

First languages (2011)
  - English: 87.1%
  - Afrikaans: 6.1%
  - Xhosa: 2.3%
  - Other: 4.5%
- Time zone: UTC+2 (SAST)
- Postal code (street): 7945
- PO box: 7946

St James is a seaside village on the Cape Peninsula, South Africa, situated on the False Bay coast between Muizenberg and Kalk Bay. The village is situated between the rocky shore and a steep mountain, and measures about 200m by 2 km. Its name derives from the early St James Catholic Church, built circa 1880. Most of the suburb was built between 1910 and 1950, after the railway line was built connecting Cape Town to False Bay.

St James beach is well known for its colourful Victorian-style bathing boxes, tidal pool and rock pools, which are popular with children. Danger Beach, also in St James, is a well-known surf spot.

Most of the homes in the area date back to the days when the Cape was still a colony of the British Empire. The houses were built from limestone, plaster and stone, with traditional thatched roofs. St James Cottage was built in 1853 and during the Anglo-Boer War, the owner Abraham Auret helped to hide prisoners of war in the loft of his barn after which they attempted to escape across the bay.

Boyes Drive runs above St James and provides scenic views of the False Bay coastline. St James is located on the Simon's Town train line and the Main Road that runs down the False Bay coast of the Cape Peninsula. There are walks and hikes on the mountains above the town, and whale watching opportunities during whale season.

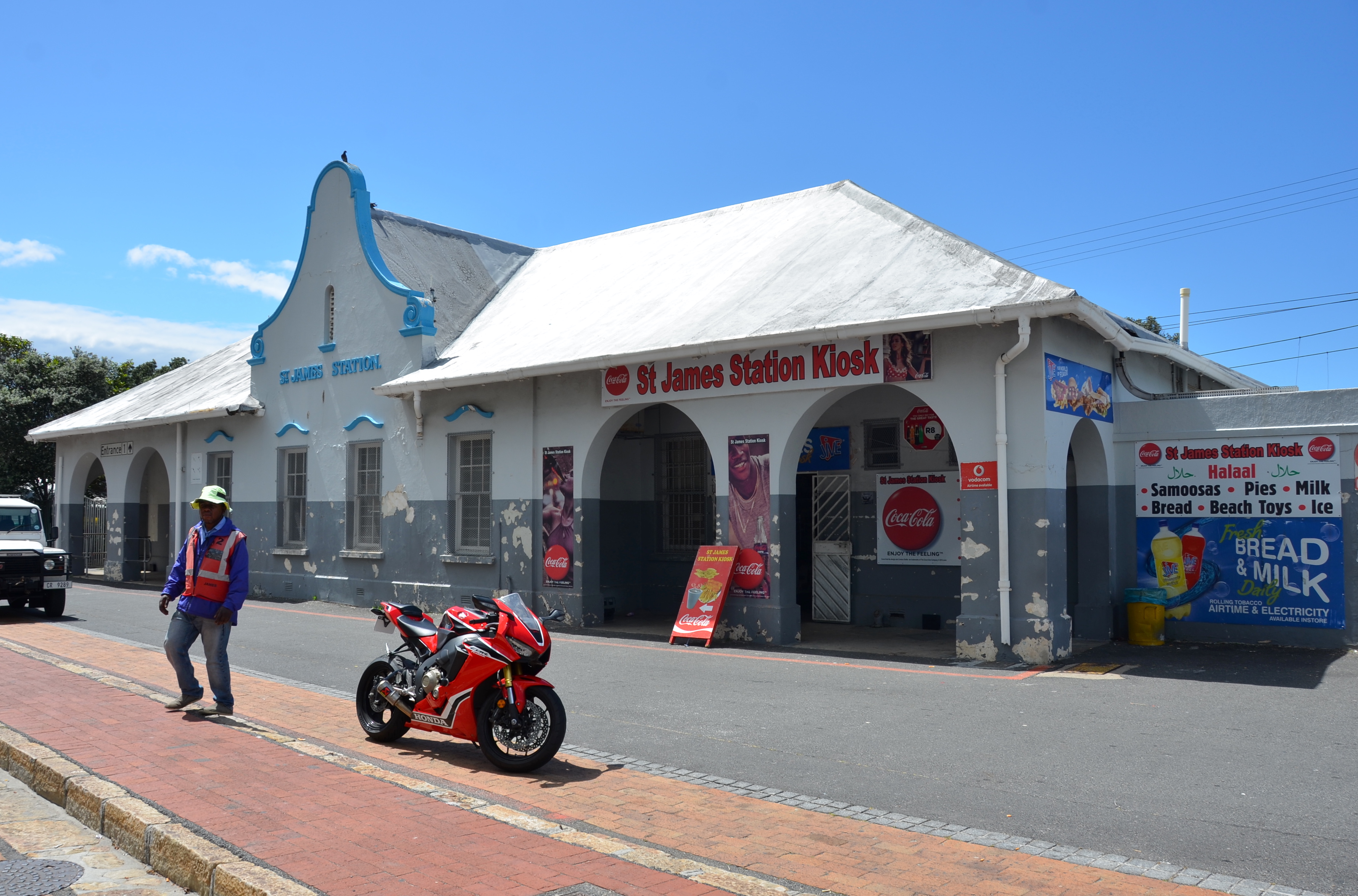
St James Station

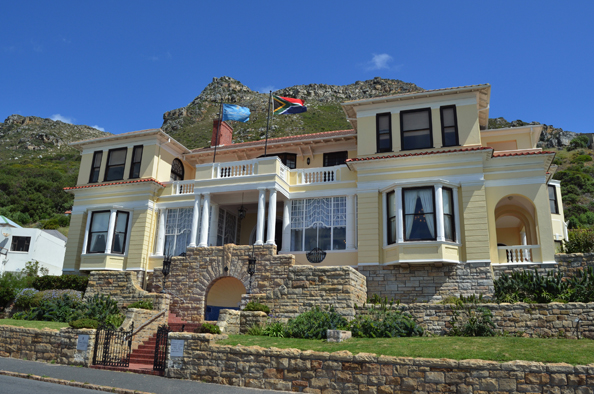
Casa Labia on the road between St James and Muizenberg

== Notable people ==
- William Wiley (1931—1999), cricketer.
- Ian Smith (1919—2007), Former politician who served as prime minister of Rhodesia (now Zimbabwe) lived in this suburb during his later years.
