= Roelf Meyer =

South African politician and businessman

Roelof Meyer GCOB
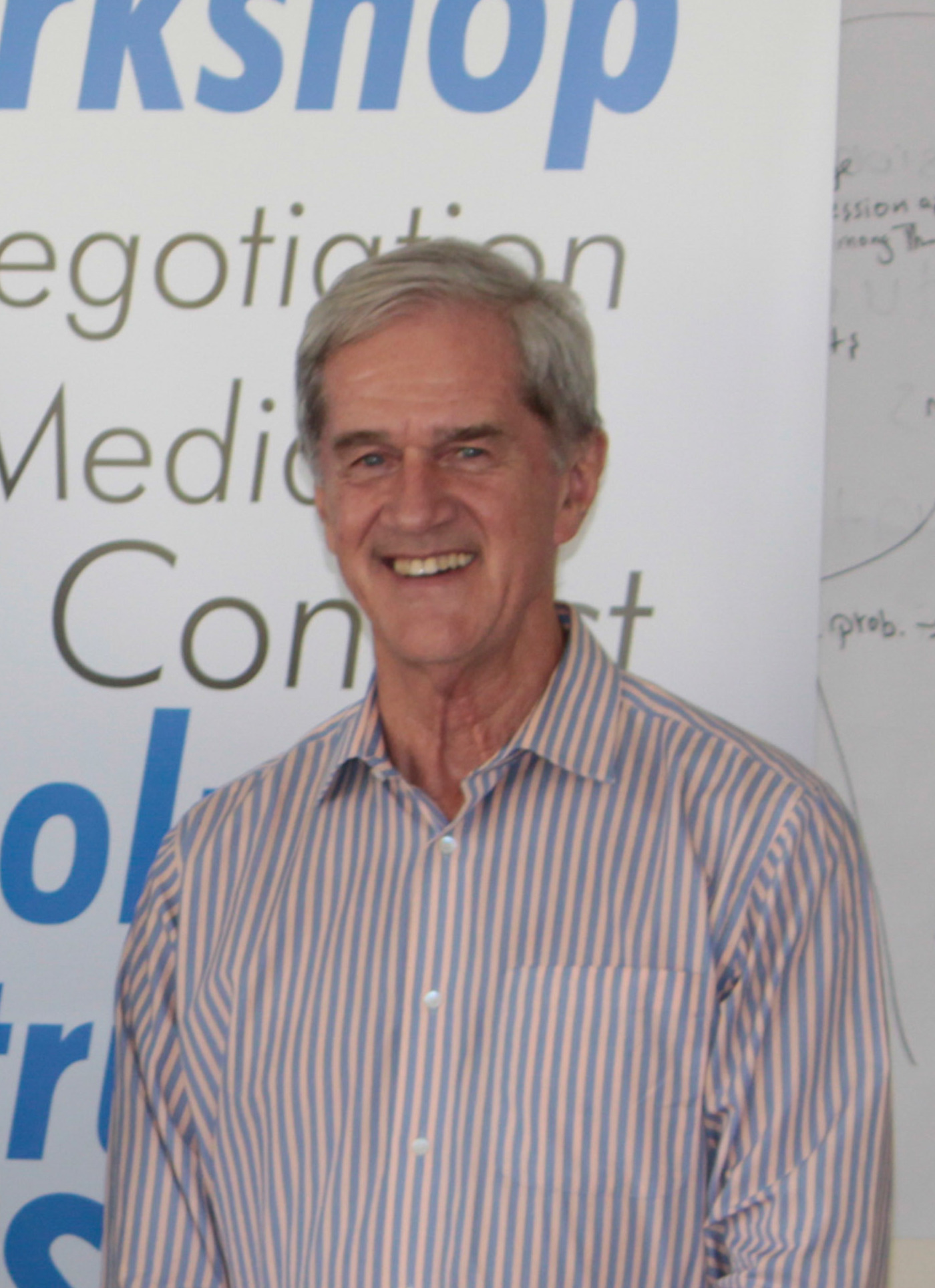
- Meyer in 2017

South African Ambassador to the United States
- Incumbent
- Assumed office 14 April 2026
- President: Cyril Ramaphosa
- Preceded by: Ebrahim Rasool

Minister of Constitutional Development and Provincial Affairs
- In office 1994–1996
- President: Nelson Mandela
- Succeeded by: Valli Moosa

Minister of Constitutional Affairs and Communication
- In office 1992–1994
- President: F. W. de Klerk

Minister of Defence
- In office 1991–1992
- President: F. W. de Klerk
- Preceded by: Magnus Malan
- Succeeded by: Gene Louw

Personal details
- Born: Roelof Petrus Meyer; 16 July 1947 (age 79) Port Elizabeth, Cape Province; Union of South Africa
- Other political affiliations: United Democratic Movement (1997–2006); National Party (until 1997)
- Spouse: Michèle Meyer
- Relations: Tobie Meyer (brother)
- Children: 6
- Education: University of the Free State

Roelof Petrus Meyer GCOB (born 16 July 1947) is a South African politician and businessman. A Member of Parliament between 1979 and 1997, he was the chief negotiator for the National Party government during the negotiations to end apartheid. He later co-founded the United Democratic Movement.

During his time in Parliament, Meyer served in the governments of three successive presidents: P. W. Botha, F. W. de Klerk, and Nelson Mandela. After resigning from the National Party in 1997, he co-founded the United Democratic Movement with Bantu Holomisa. He returned briefly to Parliament between 1999 and 2000 before retiring from frontline politics in January 2000.

== Early life and education ==
Meyer, the youngest son of Eastern Cape farmer, Hudson Meyer and school teacher Hannah Meyer, née van Heerden, attended school in Ficksburg and studied law at the University of the Free State, where he completed B Comm (1968) and LLB (1971) degrees. At university, he was president of the conservative "Afrikaanse Studentebond". During his compulsory military service, he was a member of the SADF choir also known as the "Kanaries". Meyer then practised as a lawyer in Pretoria and Johannesburg until 1980.

== Early political career ==
=== House of Assembly ===
In 1979, he entered politics as he was elected as a Member of Parliament for the National Party in the Johannesburg West constituency. In 1986, he became Deputy Minister of Law and Order, an important position in P. W. Botha's government: with the declaration of the first State of Emergency in 1961, the National Joint Management Centre (NJMC), chaired by the Deputy Minister of Law and Order, took over as the nerve centre for co-ordination of all welfare and security policies. In 1988, Meyer was appointed Deputy Minister of Constitutional Development.

In 1991, State President F. W. De Klerk appointed him Minister of Defence as successor to Magnus Malan. Allegedly, the "verligte Nat" ("liberal" or "enlightened" NP politician) couldn't win the respect of the generals in this position. In May 1992, after nine months in office, he resigned and became Minister of Constitutional Affairs and Communication as successor to Gerrit Viljoen. It was in this position that he entered the negotiating process. He also became the chairman of the Beleidsgroep vir Hervorming (Policy Group for Reform).

=== Negotiations to end apartheid ===
Meyer became famous in his position as the government's chief negotiator in the Multiparty Negotiating Forum 1993 after the failure of CODESA where he established an amicable and effective relationship with the ANC’s chief negotiator, Cyril Ramaphosa. In this role, he worked closely with Niel Barnard, who was head of the National Intelligence Service and a strong supporter of a negotiated settlement. After the conclusion of the negotiations in November 1993, he became the government's chief representative in the Transitional Executive Council (TEC). Meyer and Ramaphosa received the South African Breweries Leadership and Service Award in 2004.

== Post-apartheid political career ==
=== Minister of Constitutional Development ===
In South Africa's first post-apartheid elections in April 1994, Meyer was elected to the new National Assembly, and President Nelson Mandela appointed him as Minister of Constitutional Development and Provincial Affairs in the multi-party Government of National Unity. His elder brother Tobie Meyer was Deputy Minister of Agriculture and Land Affairs in the same government. As minister, Meyer worked once again with Cyril Ramaphosa, who was chairperson of the Constitutional Assembly tasked with ratifying the post-apartheid Constitution.

=== Secretary-General of the National Party ===
In February 1996, Meyer resigned from the cabinet in order to become secretary-general of the National Party. Because of his continued interest in reforming the National Party, he remained an unpopular figure among the party's right wing, at the time led informally by Hernus Kriel. Indeed, Meyer and Kriel had clashed publicly in the past.

In February 1997, F. W. de Klerk, who remained leader of the National Party, stripped Meyer of his position as secretary-general. In what was viewed as a demotion, Meyer was instead installed at the head of an internal task team charged with conceptualising the party's political future. That initiative was also staunchly opposed by his conservative rivals in the party, and the task team was disbanded less than three months later.

Shortly afterwards, on 17 May 1997, Meyer announced his resignation from the National Party and therefore from Parliament. He also resigned his position as provincial leader of the National Party in Gauteng; he was succeeded by Sam de Beer.

=== United Democratic Movement ===
The week after he resigned from the NP, Meyer announced the launch of what he called the New Movement Process, a process to establish a new political party that he hoped would contest the next general elections. Later the same year, Meyer and former Transkeian leader Bantu Holomisa co-founded the United Democratic Movement. At its first elective congress in 1998, he was elected to deputise Holomisa as the party's deputy president.

The United Democratic Movement won fourteen seats in the general election of 1999 and Meyer returned to the National Assembly. However, in early 2000, Meyer announced his retirement from politics, which he said was a personal decision, rather than a political one. He left the National Assembly on 31 January. In Meyer's account, he became "politically homeless" in the aftermath, until, in 2006, he announced that he had applied for membership of the African National Congress.

== Later career ==
After leaving politics, Meyer pursued his business interests, particularly in the timber industry and in consultancy. He was a member of the Strategy Committee of the Project on Justice in Times of Transition at Tufts University and served as the chairman of the Civil Society Initiative in South Africa. He has also consulted on international peace processes and negotiations, for example in Northern Ireland, Rwanda and Kosovo.

From 2012 to 2014, he chaired the Defence Review Committee in South Africa, and during that time, in 2013, he co-founded the In Transformation Initiative, a pro-democracy non profit organisation. The organisation has been involved in the South African land issue, as well as in constitutional negotiations in Sri Lanka.

On 14 April 2026, South African President Cyril Ramaphosa nominated Meyer for the vacant post of ambassador to the United States of America.

Meyer's nomination came during a period of severe diplomatic strain between the United States and South Africa, marked by the expulsion of former South African ambassador Ebrahim Rasool from the United States and an executive order suspending US aid to South Africa over concerns about South Africa’s foreign policy positions, including alleged support for Iran and Hamas, which is designated as a terrorist organization by the United States and several other countries

== Awards ==
He was awarded the Order of the Baobab, Silver, for "His immense contribution in providing special support in the birth of the new democratic South Africa through negotiations and ensuring that South Africa has a Constitution that protects all its citizens." In 1995, he received the prize "Archivio Disarmo - Golden Doves for Peace" from IRIAD.

== See also ==
- Negotiations to end apartheid in South Africa
- History of South Africa

Political offices
Preceded by Magnus Malan	Minister of Defence (South Africa); 1991–1992	Succeeded by Gene Louw
