= Gert Kotzé =

South African rugby union player

- Full name: Gerrit Jacobus Maas Kotzé
- Born: 12 August 1940 Vredendal, South Africa
- Died: 29 January 2020 (aged 79) Durbanville, South Africa
- Height: 1.86 m (6 ft 1 in)
- Weight: 94.4 kg (208 lb)

Rugby union career
- Position: Prop
Provincial / State sides
Years	Team	Apps	(Points)
1963–69	Western Province		
International career
Years	Team	Apps	(Points)
1967	South Africa	4	(0)

Gerrit Jacobus Maas Kotzé (12 August 1940 – 29 January 2020) was a South African international rugby union player.

Kotzé was born in Vredendal and educated at Hoërskool Vredendal.

A prop, Kotzé spent his entire career with Cape Town club Northerns (Connect NTK RFC) situated in Parow North. He won two Currie Cup titles representing Western Province and featured in their win over France in 1964. His international opportunity came in 1967, when he played as a tight–head prop in all four home Test matches against France, forming a front–row with Gys Pitzer and Tiny Neethling. He missed out on participating in the 1968 British Lions series after injuring an ankle during the trials.

Kotzé was a graduate of Stellenbosch University and worked many years for the financial firm Sanlam.

== See also ==
- List of South Africa national rugby union players
