= Tiny Neethling =

South African rugby union player

- Full name: Jacobus Burger Neethling
- Born: 6 July 1939 Rawsonville, South Africa
- Died: 3 April 2009 (aged 69) Paarl, South Africa
- Height: 1.86 m (6 ft 1 in)
- Weight: 103 kg (227 lb)

Rugby union career
- Position: Loose–head prop
Provincial / State sides
Years	Team	Apps	(Points)
1961–71	Western Province	81	
International career
Years	Team	Apps	(Points)
1967–70	South Africa	8	

Jacobus Burger Neethling (6 July 1939 – 3 April 2009) was a South African international rugby union player.

Neethling was born in Rawsonville and attended Goudini High School.

A strongly built prop, Neethling was a Junior Springbok and first earned representative honours for Western Province in 1961. He made his Springboks debut in a 1965 match against Combined Universities, but didn't feature at international level until two years later, playing all four matches of a home series with France. Capped sporadically thereafter, Neethling played against the British Lions at Ellis Park in 1968, Scotland at Murrayfield the following year, then ended his international career with two home Test matches against the All Blacks. He served as captain of Western Province in 1969 and finished with a provincial record of 81 appearances.

Neethling was employed by tobacco company Rembrandt Group.

== See also ==
- List of South Africa national rugby union players
