= Leon Wessels =

South African politician

Minister of Local Government
- In office 1992–1993
- Preceded by: Amie Venter
- Succeeded by: Tertius Delport

Minister of Planning and Provincial Affairs
- Preceded by: Hernus Kriel

Personal details
- Born: 19 April 1946 (age 80) Kroonstad, South Africa
- Education: Potchefstroom University; Rand Afrikaans University

Leon Wessels (born 19 April 1946) is a South African lawyer, politician, and activist who served in the National Party government during the apartheid years and was one of very few Afrikaner politicians to show public contrition for the acts of that government.

== Education ==
Like FW de Klerk he attended Hoërskool Monument in Krugersdorp, South Africa. After matriculating from that school in 1963 Wessels went on to obtain amongst others the Bachelor of Law (LLB) degree from the Potchefstroom University in 1972 and in 2001 the Doctor of Law (LLD) degree from the Rand Afrikaans University. While an undergraduate he was chairman of Potchefstroom's Students' Representative Council (SRC) and from 1971 to 1973 president of the Afrikaner Studentebond (ASB) a student organisation in which many white leaders served their political apprenticeships.

== Apartheid-era politician ==
Wessels entered national politics in 1977 when he was elected National Party member of parliament (MP) for the Krugersdorp constituency, an Afrikaner stronghold. Though increasingly identified as a verligte (a member of the party's more liberal wing) over the next two decades he rose through party ranks to become a Cabinet member, ending this chapter of his political career in the last apartheid administration as Minister of Local Government, National Housing and Manpower.

== After apartheid ==
At the hearings of the South African Truth and Reconciliation Commission into illegal acts of the country's security forces, Wessels – a former Deputy Law and Order Minister – acknowledged: "I do not believe the political defence of 'I did not know' is available to me because in many respects I believe I did not want to know."

In 1999 he was appointed to the South African Human Rights Commission where he was responsible for monitoring the Promotion of Access to Information Act, 2000, a law central to ensuring transparency in government, business and civil society.

== Personal life ==
His wife, Tersia Wessels became a member of the Gauteng provincial legislature representing the Congress of the People in 2009.
