= National Heroes' Acre =

National Heroes' Acre or variation may refer to:

- Heroes' Acre (Namibia)
- National Heroes' Acre (Zimbabwe)
- Heroes' Acre, Pretoria
