= Rand Water =

South African water utility supplying the Gauteng province

- Formerly: Rand Water Board
- Industry: Water Utility
- Founded: 8 May 1903; 123 years ago in Johannesburg, South Africa
- Headquarters: Glenvista, Gauteng, South Africa
- Key people: Matshidiso Hashatse (Chairperson); Sipho Mosai (CEO)
- Products: Bulk potable water
- Services: Infrastructure and storage system management, water purification, bulk sanitation, water quality management, and water analysis
- Revenue: ▲ R 19.578 billion
- Net income: ▲ R 3.536 billion (2023); R 3.462 billion (2022)
- Total assets: ▲ R 44.242 billion (2023); R 40.538 billion (2022)
- Parent: Department of Water and Sanitation
- Subsidiaries: Rand Water Services (Pty) Ltd; Rand Water Foundation NPC
- Website: www.randwater.co.za

Rand Water (previously known as the Rand Water Board) is a South African water utility that supplies potable water to the Gauteng province and other areas of the country and is the largest water utility in Africa. The water is drawn from numerous sources and is purified and supplied to industry, mining and local municipalities and is also involved in sanitation of waste water.

== History ==
The Witwatersrand sits on the South African Highveld and consists of mostly grasslands with summer rains with an average yearly of 784mm rainfall. The Witwatersrand ridge stretches for 96 km from east to west with rivers north of the ridge flowing to north into the Limpopo and into the Indian Ocean while the rivers south of the ridge flow south into the Vaal and Orange River and into the Atlantic Ocean. The rivers in the Witwatersrand tended to dry out in the winter and were therefore a poor source of water and semiarid with grasslands and soil more suitable for cattle and sheep farming prior to the discovery of gold.

Gold was discovered on the Witwatersrand during March 1886 and several communities would rapidly develop from tents, to villages, towns and eventually into a city called Johannesburg. Being on the watershed of two river systems, the area was always short of water for the growing industry and community. After the Second Anglo-Boer War (1899–1902), the British government took control of the Transvaal Colony and with the need to restore gold mining to pre-war levels. The Transvaal administration decided to centralise the management of water resources on the Witwatersrand and the Rand Water Board was formed on 8 May 1903 with the enactment of Rand Water Board Incorporation Ordinance No. 32.

The Board would be made up of eleven members recommended by the Governor of the Transvaal Colony, the Johannesburg Town Council, the Chamber of Mines and other municipalities at the time and would amalgamate all other companies currently supply water to that point. The initial eleven members consisted of five members from the Chamber of Mines, three from the Johannesburg municipality, one from Germiston/Boksburg, one from Springs and one from Krugersdorp/Roodepoort. It would commence operations in 1905. Later membership increased to 34 as Benoni joined in 1906, the Railways in 1914, Brakpan in 1920, Randfontein in 1929, Nigel in 1935 and Pretoria and Vereeniging in 1944.

== Water sources ==
Initial water sources for the growing town of Johannesburg were obtained from three spruits or streams, one at a spruit in Fordsburg which still runs at the western end of Commissioner Street, a stream called Natalspruit at the eastern end of Commissioner Street near Jeppestown and a spring on Parktown ridge where Johannesburg General Hospital stands.

As mining and town expanded so demand grew and two organisations formed to supply water. Braamfontein Water Company with two wells in the Parktown region supplied the town and Vierfontein Syndicate that supplied mining and drinking water while the first grant to supply water came via the Sivewright Concession of 1887 that established the Johannesburg Waterworks and Exploration Company. James Sivewright was granted the concession by the South African Republic (ZAR) to supply water to the town of Johannesburg but the concession did not oblige his company to supply it. By 1889, Sivewright had sold his concession to Johannesburg Waterworks, Estate and Exploration Company Limited, that was owned by Barney Barnato.

The company then built a dam at a site in present-day Doornfontein where the Ellis Park Stadium is now positioned and then pumped the water to a reservoir on the ridge above Saratoga Avenue on the corner of Harrow Road and this gravity fed supply was said to have provided 3,409,569L during the rainy season. The population of the town, run at that time by a Sanitary Board, was petitioned in 1892 concerning the lack of adequate water supply and its cost, 15s per gallon and 5s per month for metering. The Johannesburg Waterworks Company was said to be supplying 4,091,400L a day by 1895 but had to use mules and carts to transport water to the higher parts of the town during a drought that year and all water still had to be boiled before use.

The ZAR government appointed a commission of enquiry in the same year to investigate the future of water supply and its quality. The commission handed down a recommendation that the management of water supply should be held by a public authority but this had not occurred before war broke out in 1899, the Second Boer War. In 1898, the Johannesburg Waterworks Company sunk boreholes on the farm Zuurbekom (on the outskirts of Lenasia; 26.30104°S 27.81350°E), under which was a natural aquifer of 466 km^{2} that would eventually produce 34 095 000 litres a day. In 1899, the Zuurbekom Pumphouse was erected by the Johannesburg Exploration and Estate Company and is still operational. Its purpose was to extract and provide the water from the dolomite rocks under the vast wetland to Central Witwatersrand. In 1975, it was declared a National Monument, and subsequently made into a Provincial Heritage Site in 2000.

By 1901, the British forces were in control of Johannesburg, though the war continued elsewhere, and the idea of a public body to control water supply was resurrected with the formation of a municipal council and by November a commission of enquiry was formed. The Witwatersrand Water Supply Commission was formed on 4 November 1901 and after three months recommended the formation of the public Rand Water Board to supply water to the towns and mines of the Witwatersrand from Springs in the east and Randfontein in the west.

With the creation of the Rand Water Board, bore holes were driven into river bed of the Klip River but by 1914, the Board decided to build a barrage on the Vaal River 64 km to the south of Johannesburg with the Vereeniging Pumping Station which was opened on 27 July 1923 by the Governor-General. Water was pumped through 137 cm pipes from the barrage at 1,432m to a height of 1828m on the Witwatersrand. More water was still required and by 1937 the Vaal Dam was completed 80 km south-east of Johannesburg.

The next major project was the Lesotho Highlands Water Project in 1998 that saw the construction of several large dams and pipeline transporting water from Lesotho to the Vaal Dam in South Africa.

== Supply system ==
Rand Water provides potable water to metropolitan and local municipalities, industry and mining in Gauteng, and parts of Mpumalanga, the Free State, and North West provinces. Rand Water has water network of 3 500 km of pipelines, 60 reservoirs, supplying 4 520 million litres of water daily to its varied customers. Its headquarters is in the suburb of Glenvista.
