= List of heritage sites in Gauteng =

South African heritage sites

This is a list of the heritage sites in Gauteng as recognised by the South African Heritage Resource Agency.

| SAHRA identifier | Site name | Description | Town | District | NHRA status | Coordinates | Image |
|---|---|---|---|---|---|---|---|
| 9/2/200/0003 | Meyer Dwelling, Meyersdal, Alberton District | | | Alberton | Provisional Protection | 26°17′31″S 28°05′50″E | Upload Photo |
| 9/2/209/0001 | Old Post Office, Market Street, Boksburg | Type of site: Post Office | Boksburg | Boksburg | Provincial Heritage Site | 26°13′20″S 28°15′28″E | Type of site: Post Office |
| 9/2/209/0002 | Old Magistrates Office, Church Street, Boksburg | The old Government Building at Boksburg is situated in Church Street near the station and the well-known Boksburg Lake The building was designed in 1889, two years after the establishment of the town of Boksburg by Sytze Wierda, the "Gouvernements Ingenieur en Architect" of the South African Republic, to accommodate the mining commissioner, the post office and other govern Type of site: Magistrates Office. Historical Interest The building was designed in 1889, two years after the establishment of the town of Boksburg by Sytze Wierda, the "Gouvernements Ingenieur en Architect" of the South African Republic, to accommodate the mining commissioner, the post of | Boksburg | Boksburg | Provincial Heritage Site | 26°13′12″S 28°14′27″E | The old Government Building at Boksburg is situated in Church Street near the station and the well-known Boksburg Lake The building was designed in 1889, two years after the establishment of the town of Boksburg by Sytze Wierda, the "Gouvernements Ingenieur en Architect" of the South African Republic, to accommodate the mining commissioner, the post office and other govern Type of site: Magistrates Office. Historical Interest The building was designed in 1889, two years after the establishment of the town of Boksburg by Sytze Wierda, the "Gouvernements Ingenieur en Architect" of the South African Republic, to accommodate the mining commissioner, the post of Media related to Old Magistrates Office, Boksburg at Wikimedia Commons |
| 9/2/209/0006 | Farmhouse, Vlakplaats, Boksburg District | Type of site: Farm House (European Settler) | | Boksburg | Provisional Protection | 26°13′02″S 28°15′28″E | Upload Photo |
| 9/2/209/0007 | St Michael and All Angels Church, Plein Street, Boksburg | The church of St Michael and All Angels was designed by Sir Herbert Baker in the Romanesque style and consecrated in 1912. Type of site: Church | Boksburg | Boksburg | Provincial Heritage Site | 26°13′18″S 28°14′30″E | The church of St Michael and All Angels was designed by Sir Herbert Baker in the Romanesque style and consecrated in 1912. Type of site: Church Media related to St Michael and All Angels Church at Wikimedia Commons |
| 9/2/209/0008 | Conservation Areas, Boksburg | Type of site: Conservation area | Boksburg | Boksburg | Heritage Area | 26°13′12″S 28°15′41″E | Upload Photo |
| 9/2/211/0001 | Pentecost Protestant Church, Abrahamowitz Street, Brakpan | Type of site: Church | Brakpan | Brakpan | Register | 26°13′07″S 28°23′02″E | Type of site: Church Media related to Pentecost Protestant Church, Brakpan at Wikimedia Commons |
| 9/2/223/0002 | Horwood Homestead, Edenvale, Germiston District | | Edenvale | Germiston | Provincial Heritage Site | 26°08′41″S 28°09′54″E | |
| 9/2/223/0004 | Simmer and Jack Mine Houses, Main Reef Road, Germiston | | Germiston | Germiston | Provisional Protection | 26°11′48″S 28°09′54″E | Upload Photo |
| 9/2/223/0011 | St Andrew's Presbyterian Church, F H Odendaal Street, Germiston | The St Andrew's Presbyterian Congregation was established in 1890 and its early history is closely interwoven with that of Germiston itself. The corner-stone of the present well preserved church building, which was designed in the neo-Gothic style, was la Type of site: Church | Germiston | Germiston | Provincial Heritage Site | 26°12′46″S 28°09′45″E | The St Andrew's Presbyterian Congregation was established in 1890 and its early history is closely interwoven with that of Germiston itself. The corner-stone of the present well preserved church building, which was designed in the neo-Gothic style, was la Type of site: Church |
| 9/2/226/0001 | 60 Strydom Street, Heidelberg. | The Standard Bank of British South Africa occupied this building from August 1879 to October 1881. This period included the duration of the first Anglo-Boer war (Dec 1880 to March 1881) | Heidelberg | Heidelberg | Provincial Heritage Site | 26°30′06″S 28°21′25″E | The Standard Bank of British South Africa occupied this building from August 1879 to October 1881. This period included the duration of the first Anglo-Boer war (Dec 1880 to March 1881) |
| 9/2/226/0002 | De Rust Farmstead, Boschhoek, Heidelberg District | Type of site: Farm Complex | | Heidelberg | Provincial Heritage Site | 26°29′28″S 28°23′03″E | Upload Photo |
| 9/2/226/0003 | Old Residence, H F Verwoerd Street, Heidelberg | | Heidelberg | Heidelberg | Provisional Protection | 26°29′52″S 28°21′32″E | Upload Photo |
| 9/2/226/0004 | Dutch Reformed Church, H F Verwoerd Street, Heidelberg | The D.R. Church in Heidelberg, situated in HF Verwoerd Street, is one of the finest examples in Gauteng of a church built of stone. It is visible from all sides and is indeed a worthy monument. The corner-stone of the church was laid on 12 April 1890, Type of site: Church. The church was inaugurated in 1890. At a meeting held in the basement hall on 24 July 1903, it was decided to establish a "Volkskool". As a result of this, the present "Hoër Volkskool" and the Heidelberg Training College came into being. | Heidelberg | Heidelberg | Provincial Heritage Site | 26°29′57″S 28°21′21″E | The D.R. Church in Heidelberg, situated in HF Verwoerd Street, is one of the finest examples in Gauteng of a church built of stone. It is visible from all sides and is indeed a worthy monument. The corner-stone of the church was laid on 12 April 1890, Type of site: Church. The church was inaugurated in 1890. At a meeting held in the basement hall on 24 July 1903, it was decided to establish a "Volkskool". As a result of this, the present "Hoër Volkskool" and the Heidelberg Training College came into being. |
| 9/2/226/0005 | Boer Houses and Farmyard, Suikerbosrand Nature Reserve, Diepkloof, Heidelberg District | Type of site: Dwellings, Farm Complex | | Heidelberg | Provincial Heritage Site | 26°29′28″S 28°23′03″E | Type of site: Dwellings, Farm Complex |
| 9/2/226/0007 | NZASM Station, Voortrekker Street, Heidelberg | The exceptional railway station building at Heidelberg, with its Dutch stepped gable on the street side and decorative gable on the platform side, was festively opened on 10 October 1896. The guests of honour at this occasion were Dr W. J. Leyds, State Se Type of site: Station Building | Heidelberg | Heidelberg | Provincial Heritage Site | 26°30′01″S 28°21′29″E | The exceptional railway station building at Heidelberg, with its Dutch stepped gable on the street side and decorative gable on the platform side, was festively opened on 10 October 1896. The guests of honour at this occasion were Dr W. J. Leyds, State Se Type of site: Station Building |
| 9/2/226/0008 | Volk School Primary, Begeman Street, Heidelberg | The "Volkskool" was founded in 1903 at a meeting held in the basement hall of the Dutch Reformed Church, Heidelberg. This school building was erected in 1907 in memory of the inhabitants of the District of Heidelberg, who lost their lives during the Anglo Type of site: School | Heidelberg | Heidelberg | Provincial Heritage Site | 26°29′52″S 28°21′24″E | The "Volkskool" was founded in 1903 at a meeting held in the basement hall of the Dutch Reformed Church, Heidelberg. This school building was erected in 1907 in memory of the inhabitants of the District of Heidelberg, who lost their lives during the Anglo Type of site: School |
| 9/2/228/0001/032-001 | Old Hebrew High School Building, Hillbrow, Johannesburg. | Type of site: School. This building was designed by Kallenbach and Kennedy during 1910 for J.H. Isaacs. It was built as a Hebrew school with 4 classrooms, 1 assembly hall, a cloakroom and a committee room, at a cost of 2 500. Bedrooms, a kitchen and a sitting room were added i | Johannesburg, Hillbrow | Johannesburg | Register | 26°11′20″S 28°02′56″E | Upload Photo |
| 9/2/228/0001/078-001 | Villa Guy, Peter's Place and Dudley Court, Seventh Avenue, Parktown North, Johannesburg | Apart from minor changes, the buildings have survived substantially intact and are excellent examples of small suburban "maisonettes" in the Art Deco Moderne Style. They are the only buildings of their kind in Parktown North. | Johannesburg, Parktown North | Johannesburg | Register | 26°08′41″S 28°01′44″E | Apart from minor changes, the buildings have survived substantially intact and are excellent examples of small suburban "maisonettes" in the Art Deco Moderne Style. They are the only buildings of their kind in Parktown North. |
| 9/2/228/0003 | The View, Parktown, Johannesburg | | Johannesburg, Parktown | Johannesburg | Provincial Heritage Site | 26°10′53″S 28°02′43″E | Media related to The View, Parktown at Wikimedia Commons |
| 9/2/228/0004 | Ansteys Building, Jeppe Street, Johannesburg | | Johannesburg | Johannesburg | Provincial Heritage Site | 26°12′07″S 28°02′33″E | |
| 9/2/228/0005/001 | Conservation Area, Parktown, Johannesburg | Type of site: Conservation area | Johannesburg | Johannesburg | Heritage Area | 26°11′01″S 28°02′30″E | Upload Photo |
| 9/2/228/0006 | Whitehall Court, Killarney, Johannesburg | Type of site: Flats | Johannesburg, Killarney | Johannesburg | Provisional Protection | 26°10′05″S 28°03′07″E | Type of site: Flats Media related to Whitehall Court, Johannesburg at Wikimedia Commons |
| 9/2/228/0008 | Jeppe High School for Boys, Kensington, Johannesburg | Type of site: School | Johannesburg, Kensington | Johannesburg | Provincial Heritage Site | 26°11′59″S 28°04′51″E | Type of site: School |
| 9/2/228/0009 | Tracey's Folly, 11 Grace Road, Observatory, Johannesburg | | Johannesburg, Observatory | Johannesburg | Provisional Protection | 26°10′11″S 28°05′09″E | |
| 9/2/228/0015 | Mohamedan Primary School, Burgersdorp, Johannesburg | Type of site: School | Johannesburg, Burgersdorp | Johannesburg | Provincial Heritage Site | 26°12′08″S 28°01′25″E | Upload Photo |
| 9/2/228/0019/001 | Compound, Newtown Electricity Site, Johannesburg | | Johannesburg, Newtown | Johannesburg | Provincial Heritage Site | 26°12′09″S 28°01′54″E | Upload Photo |
| 9/2/228/0020 | Kimberley House, 44 Pritchard Street, Johannesburg | | Johannesburg | Johannesburg | Provincial Heritage Site | 26°12′13″S 28°02′27″E | |
| 9/2/228/0021 | Zaxonia-and -Hanson Building, Diagonal Street, Johannesburg | | Johannesburg | Johannesburg | Provisional Protection | 26°12′16″S 28°02′11″E | |
| 9/2/228/0029 | Salisbury House, 218-220 Marshall Street, Jeppestown, Johannesburg | | Johannesburg, Jeppestown | Johannesburg | Provincial Heritage Site | 26°12′23″S 28°03′13″E | |
| 9/2/228/0031 | Sunny Side Park, York Road, Parktown, Johannesburg | Type of site: Hotel | Johannesburg, Parktown | Johannesburg | Provincial Heritage Site | 26°10′43″S 28°02′49″E | Type of site: Hotel Media related to Sunnyside Park Hotel at Wikimedia Commons |
| 9/2/228/0032 | Fever Hospital, Braamfontein, Johannesburg | Type of site: Hospital | Johannesburg, Braamfontein | Johannesburg | Provincial Heritage Site | 26°11′27″S 28°02′28″E | Type of site: Hospital |
| 9/2/228/0034 | SA Institute for Medical Research, Hospital Hill, Johannesburg | Type of site: Hospital | Johannesburg | Johannesburg | Provincial Heritage Site | 26°12′16″S 28°06′58″E | Type of site: Hospital |
| 9/2/228/0035 | Old Fort, Hospital Hill, Johannesburg | Johannesburg’s historic old fort stands in Kotzi Street on Hospital Hill, to the north of the city centre. In 1896 the Government of the South African Republic decided to build a fort round the existing prison. The prison was built already in 1892 and enlarged in 1894. The fort was completed in 1899 and handed over to the State Artillery. At the end of 1895 a Type of site: Fort. Historical interest. In 1896 the Government of the South African Republic decided to build a fort round the existing prison. The prison was built already in 1892 and enlarged in 1894. The fort was completed in 1899 and handed over to the State Artillery. | Johannesburg | Johannesburg | Provincial Heritage Site | 26°11′19″S 28°02′33″E | Johannesburg’s historic old fort stands in Kotzi Street on Hospital Hill, to the north of the city centre. In 1896 the Government of the South African Republic decided to build a fort round the existing prison. The prison was built already in 1892 and enlarged in 1894. The fort was completed in 1899 and handed over to the State Artillery. At the end of 1895 a Type of site: Fort. Historical interest. In 1896 the Government of the South African Republic decided to build a fort round the existing prison. The prison was built already in 1892 and enlarged in 1894. The fort was completed in 1899 and handed over to the State Artillery. Media related to Johannesburg Fort at Wikimedia Commons |
| 9/2/228/0036 | Parktown Boys' High School, Wellington Avenue, Parktown, Johannesburg | Type of site: School | Johannesburg, Parktown | Johannesburg | Provincial Heritage Site | 26°11′05″S 28°02′05″E | Upload Photo |
| 9/2/228/0039 | Casa Bedo, Waverley, Johannesburg | Casa Bedo is an extremely important house in the development of the South African architecture, being the adaptation of the Prairie House to this country. It created a whole new fashion which spread beyond Johannesburg. The building was designed by Doug | Johannesburg, Waverley | Johannesburg | Register | 26°08′09″S 28°04′43″E | Casa Bedo is an extremely important house in the development of the South African architecture, being the adaptation of the Prairie House to this country. It created a whole new fashion which spread beyond Johannesburg. The building was designed by Doug |
| 9/2/228/0041 | House Hains, 34 Becker Street, Yeoville, Johannesburg | Type of site: House | Johannesburg, Yeoville | Johannesburg | Provincial Heritage Site | 26°11′01″S 28°03′39″E | Upload Photo |
| 9/2/228/0042 | Bezuidenhout Farmstead and Jonkers House, Dewetshof, Johannesburg | Type of site: Farm Complex | Johannesburg, Dewetshof | Johannesburg | Provincial Heritage Site | 26°12′12″S 28°02′39″E | Upload Photo |
| 9/2/228/0044 | The Cullinan, 3 Ash Street, Houghton Estate, Johannesburg | | Johannesburg, Houghton Estate | Johannesburg | Provincial Heritage Site | 26°10′33″S 28°03′46″E | |
| 9/2/228/0045 | Glenshiel, Woolston Road, Westcliff, Johannesburg | This imposing building was designed by Sir Herbert Baker and his partner, Fleming. It was built between 1909 and 1910 for Lieut.-Col. William Dalrymple (later Sir William Dalrymple). "Glenshier' is known as one of Sir Herbert Baker's bigger houses. The or ... | Johannesburg, Westcliff | Johannesburg | Provincial Heritage Site | 26°10′20″S 28°01′39″E | Upload Photo |
| 9/2/228/0048 | Emoyeni, Parktown, Johannesburg | Emoyeni was designed by the pioneering firm of Johannesburg architects Leck & Emley and was completed in 1906 for Henry Charles Hull, later the first Minister of Finance in the Union Parliament. The house was designed in the Neo Queen Anne style. | Johannesburg, Parktown | Johannesburg | Provincial Heritage Site | 26°10′30″S 28°04′18″E | Emoyeni was designed by the pioneering firm of Johannesburg architects Leck & Emley and was completed in 1906 for Henry Charles Hull, later the first Minister of Finance in the Union Parliament. The house was designed in the Neo Queen Anne style. Media related to Emoyeni, Parktown at Wikimedia Commons |
| 9/2/228/0049 | Barclays Bank Museum, 90 Market Street, Johannesburg | Type of site: Bank Current use: Museum. | Johannesburg | Johannesburg | Provisional Protection | 26°12′18″S 28°02′27″E | Type of site: Bank Current use: Museum. |
| 9/2/228/0054 | Savernake, 13 Jubilee Road, Parktown, Johannesburg | | Johannesburg | Johannesburg | Register | 26°10′39″S 28°02′25″E | |
| 9/2/228/0057 | Emil Kessler Locomotive, South Station Building, Johannesburg | Type of site: Locomotive | Johannesburg | Johannesburg | Heritage Object | | Upload Photo |
| 9/2/228/0058 | 143 Fulham Road, Brixton, Johannesburg | | Johannesburg, Brixton | Johannesburg | Provincial Heritage Site | 26°11′36″S 28°00′10″E | Media related to 143 Fulham Road, Brixton at Wikimedia Commons |
| 9/2/228/0059 | Old Post Office, 315 Main Street, Jeppestown, Johannesburg | Type of site: Post Office | Johannesburg, Jeppestown | Johannesburg | Provincial Heritage Site | 26°12′15″S 28°03′51″E | Type of site: Post Office |
| 9/2/228/0060 | 33 Landau Terrace, Richmond, Johannesburg | | Johannesburg, Richmond | Johannesburg | Provincial Heritage Site | 26°10′46″S 28°00′53″E | Upload Photo |
| 9/2/228/0061 | De Klerk's Coppersmith, Doornfontein, Johannesburg | | Johannesburg, Doornfontein | Johannesburg | Provincial Heritage Site | 26°11′50″S 28°03′15″E | Upload Photo |
| 9/2/228/0063 | Hazeldene Hall, Parktown, Johannesburg | | Johannesburg, Parktown | Johannesburg | Provincial Heritage Site | 26°10′52″S 28°02′45″E | Media related to Hazeldene Hall, Parktown at Wikimedia Commons |
| 9/2/228/0064 | Dolobran, Parktown, Johannesburg | This house, known as Dolobran, was designed for Sir Charles Llewellyn Andersson by the firm J. A. Cope and Christie and was completed in 1906. The building is exceptionally eclectic in style. | Johannesburg, Parktown | Johannesburg | Provincial Heritage Site | 26°10′43″S 28°02′15″E | This house, known as Dolobran, was designed for Sir Charles Llewellyn Andersson by the firm J. A. Cope and Christie and was completed in 1906. The building is exceptionally eclectic in style. |
| 9/2/228/0067 | Rissik Street Post Office, Rissik Street, Johannesburg | This building was originally designed by Sytze Wierda. Construction work was started around 1896 under the supervision of M. Meischke and A. Reid. The foundation stone of the building was laid on 27 January 1897 by J. van Apphen, the Postmaster General. In 1 Type of site: Post Office. This building was originally designed by Sytze Wierda. Construction work was started around 1896 under the supervision of M. Meischke and A. Reid. The foundation stone of the building was laid on 27 January 1897 by J. van Apphen, the Postmaster General. | Johannesburg | Johannesburg | Provincial Heritage Site | 26°12′05″S 28°02′30″E | This building was originally designed by Sytze Wierda. Construction work was started around 1896 under the supervision of M. Meischke and A. Reid. The foundation stone of the building was laid on 27 January 1897 by J. van Apphen, the Postmaster General. In 1 Type of site: Post Office. This building was originally designed by Sytze Wierda. Construction work was started around 1896 under the supervision of M. Meischke and A. Reid. The foundation stone of the building was laid on 27 January 1897 by J. van Apphen, the Postmaster General. Media related to Rissik Street Post Office, Johannesburg at Wikimedia Commons |
| 9/2/228/0068 | City Hall Complex, Rissik Street, Johannesburg | The corner-stone of the City Hall Complex was laid on 29 November 1910 by the Duke of Connaught and Strathearn and the building was officially opened on 7 April 1915 by Governor-General Lord Buxton. It was designed in a grandiose Edwardian Baroque style. site: City Hall | Johannesburg | Johannesburg | Provincial Heritage Site | 26°12′16″S 28°02′30″E | The corner-stone of the City Hall Complex was laid on 29 November 1910 by the Duke of Connaught and Strathearn and the building was officially opened on 7 April 1915 by Governor-General Lord Buxton. It was designed in a grandiose Edwardian Baroque style. site: City Hall Media related to Johannesburg Town Hall at Wikimedia Commons |
| 9/2/228/0069 | Johannesburg Art Gallery, Joubert Park, Johannesburg | Type of site: Art Gallery | Johannesburg | Johannesburg | Provincial Heritage Site | 26°11′49″S 28°02′50″E | Type of site: Art Gallery Media related to Johannesburg Art Gallery at Wikimedia Commons |
| 9/2/228/0070 | Poswohl Synagogue, Mooi Street, Johannesburg | Type of site: Synagogue. The cornerstone of this neo-Byzantine synagogue was laid on 24 August 1921. The building was erected by a community of Jews who emigrated from Poswohl in Lithuania to Johannesburg after the turn of the century. | Johannesburg | Johannesburg | Provincial Heritage Site | 26°12′07″S 28°03′03″E | Upload Photo |
| 9/2/228/0071 | Lion House, 20 Roberts Avenue, Kensington, Johannesburg | | Johannesburg, Kensington | Johannesburg | Provincial Heritage Site | 26°12′02″S 28°04′39″E | Upload Photo |
| 9/2/228/0072 | 29 Durris Street, Forest Town, Johannesburg | | Johannesburg, Forest Town | Johannesburg | Provincial Heritage Site | 26°10′13″S 28°02′02″E | Upload Photo |
| 9/2/228/0076 | 37 Carter Road, Forest Hill, Johannesburg | | Johannesburg, Forest Hill | Johannesburg | Provincial Heritage Site | 26°15′10″S 28°02′19″E | Upload Photo |
| 9/2/228/0077 | Friedenskirche, Twist Street, Hillbrow, Johannesburg | | Johannesburg, Hillbrow | Johannesburg | Provincial Heritage Site | 26°11′30″S 28°02′51″E | |
| 9/2/228/0078 | North Lodge, Parktown, Johannesburg | North Lodge was designed by Herbert J. Aldwyncle and completed in 1906 for H. S. Wilson. The architect endeavored imitate a French castle from the late Gothic period, and the result was the most architecturally romantic house in Parktown. | Johannesburg, Parktown | Johannesburg | Provincial Heritage Site | 26°10′59″S 28°02′30″E | Upload Photo |
| 9/2/228/0079 | Hotel School, 231 Smith Street, Johannesburg | Type of site: Hotel, Training School | Johannesburg | Johannesburg | Register | 26°13′39″S 27°56′02″E | Type of site: Hotel, Training School |
| 9/2/228/0080 | Dan Pienaar Creche, Parktown, Johannesburg | The building was designed in 1902 by Aburrow and Treeby and erected during 1902/03 for Mr H.F. Watson. Mr Watson remained there until 1919. It was later bought by Sister Rhodes Samuels. | Johannesburg, Parktown | Johannesburg | Register | 26°10′50″S 28°02′21″E | Upload Photo |
| 9/2/228/0081 | Darjeeling House, St John's Road, Houghton Estate, Johannesburg | Darjeeling House was designed by Mr T Schaerer, a well-known Johannesburg architect, and erected in 1910. The building has a simplified Dutch gable and long covered verandah. Except for additions in 1913 and 1976, alterations had been limited. | Johannesburg, Houghton Estate | Johannesburg | Register | 26°09′00″S 28°03′02″E | Upload Photo |
| 9/2/228/0082 | Melville Primary School, 63 Second Avenue, Melville, Johannesburg | Type of site: School | Johannesburg, Mellville | Johannesburg | Register | 26°10′36″S 28°00′19″E | Type of site: School |
| 9/2/228/0083 | Gable Ends, 3 Jubilee Road, Parktown, Johannesburg | | Johannesburg, Parktown | Johannesburg | Provisional Protection | 26°10′42″S 28°02′17″E | Media related to Gable Ends, Parktown at Wikimedia Commons |
| 9/2/228/0084 | Solomon House, 5 Jubilee Road, Parktown, Johannesburg | | Johannesburg | Johannesburg | Register | 26°10′42″S 28°02′19″E | Upload Photo |
| 9/2/228/0085 | Phoenix Foundry, 87 Hay Street, Ophirton, Johannesburg | Type of site: Foundry Iron/Brass | Johannesburg, Ophirton | Johannesburg | Register | 26°13′20″S 28°01′45″E | Upload Photo |
| 9/2/228/0087 | Terrace Houses, Bertrams, Johannesburg | Type of site: Terrace. These Terraced Houses designed and built in 1905 are a very rare example of terrace housing in Johannesburg. These houses with their bow windows, each topped with a crenellated lintel and a gable above that with a miniature porticoed gable. | Johannesburg, Bertrams | Johannesburg | Register | 26°11′36″S 28°03′58″E | Upload Photo |
| 9/2/228/0095 | Langlaagte Deep Mining Village, Langlaagte, Johannesburg | | Johannesburg, Langlaagte | Johannesburg | Provincial Heritage Site | 26°12′04″S 27°59′23″E | Upload Photo |
| 9/2/228/0096 | Crown Mines Head Office, Crown Mines, Johannesburg | | Johannesburg, Crown Mines | Johannesburg | Provincial Heritage Site | 26°12′14″S 28°02′50″E | Upload Photo |
| 9/2/228/0097 | Pilrig House, 1 Rockridge Road, Parktown, Johannesburg | | Johannesburg, Parktown | Johannesburg | Provincial Heritage Site | 26°10′41″S 28°01′56″E | |
| 9/2/228/0098 | Central Block, University of the Witwatersrand, Johannesburg | | Johannesburg | Johannesburg | Provincial Heritage Site | 26°12′13″S 28°02′34″E | Media related to Central Block, University of the Witwatersrand at Wikimedia Commons |
| 9/2/228/0099 | Cuthberts Building, Eloff Street, Johannesburg | The firm of WM Cuthbert & Co, shoe merchants, was established in 1882. Their Johannesburg building was designed by architects Stucke & Bannister and was completed in 1904. It rapidly became a major landmark in the mining town and retains many of its Victorian details. It was declared a National Monument under old NMC legislation on 27 June 1986. | Johannesburg | Johannesburg | Provincial Heritage Site | 26°12′41″S 28°02′39″E | The firm of WM Cuthbert & Co, shoe merchants, was established in 1882. Their Johannesburg building was designed by architects Stucke & Bannister and was completed in 1904. It rapidly became a major landmark in the mining town and retains many of its Victorian details. It was declared a National Monument under old NMC legislation on 27 June 1986. Media related to Cuthberts Building, Johannesburg at Wikimedia Commons |
| 9/2/228/0104 | The Hamlet, Parktown, Johannesburg | The house was designed by Leck and Emley in the Arts and Crafts tradition for Frederick William Diamond, a stockborker and accountant who had come to Johannesburg just after the discovery of gold. | Johannesburg, Parktown | Johannesburg | Register | 26°10′50″S 28°02′21″E | Upload Photo |
| 9/2/228/0113 | Northwards, Parktown, Johannesburg | This mansion was designed in 1904 by Sir Herbert Baker. It is constructed of dressed mountain stone and brick and, from a town-planning point of view, forms an essential part of Parktown. Type of site: House | Johannesburg, Parktown | Johannesburg | Provincial Heritage Site | 26°10′50″S 28°02′21″E | This mansion was designed in 1904 by Sir Herbert Baker. It is constructed of dressed mountain stone and brick and, from a town-planning point of view, forms an essential part of Parktown. Type of site: House |
| 9/2/228/0114/001 | Chinese United Club Mansions, 6 Commissioner Street, Johannesburg | Type of site: Flats. Building commenced in 1948. It is surely the most closest to the Baroque style done by Pabst. The final building is very much like the early perspective drawing by Pabst, except that it has fewer floors. | Johannesburg | Johannesburg | Register | 26°12′24″S 28°01′57″E | Type of site: Flats. Building commenced in 1948. It is surely the most closest to the Baroque style done by Pabst. The final building is very much like the early perspective drawing by Pabst, except that it has fewer floors. Media related to Chinese United Club Mansions at Wikimedia Commons |
| 9/2/228/0114/002 | The house at 217A Frederick Drive, Northcliff, Johannesburg | Type of site: House. Possibly the first Pabst house in South Africa built for Dr. and Mrs Jochel, brother-in-law of Mr. Cohen the founder of Northcliff. Built in the International Style around 1935. | Johannesburg, Northcliff | Johannesburg | Register | 26°08′33″S 27°58′31″E | Type of site: House. Possibly the first Pabst house in South Africa built for Dr. and Mrs Jochel, brother-in-law of Mr. Cohen the founder of Northcliff. Built in the International Style around 1935. |
| 9/2/228/0114/003 | Colin Gordon Nursing Home, 15 Esselen Street, Hillbrow, Johannesburg | Of all Pabst's buildings the exterior of this one demonstrates his intoxication with curved forms to the full. The interior planning caused considerable consternation to the numerous owners of the nursing home. | Johannesburg, Hillbrow | Johannesburg | Register | 26°11′27″S 28°02′42″E | Upload Photo |
| 9/2/228/0114/004 | Patidar Mansions, 40 President Street, Johannesburg | Type of site: Flats | Johannesburg | Johannesburg | Register | 26°12′17″S 28°02′12″E | Type of site: Flats |
| 9/2/228/0115 | Stone Ledge, St David Road, Houghton, Johannesburg | | Johannesburg, Houghton | Johannesburg | Provincial Heritage Site | 26°10′21″S 28°04′05″E | Upload Photo |
| 9/2/228/0116 | 57 St Patrick's Road, Houghton Estate, Johannesburg | The house was built in 1903 at a cost of 8 775 pounds to the design of Leck and Emley. The stables, coach house, gate posts and servants quarters were erected in 1904. It is representative of the eclecticism of the Victorian Edwardian architecture. | Johannesburg, Houghton Estate | Johannesburg | Register | 26°10′45″S 28°02′28″E | Upload Photo |
| 9/2/228/0121 | Villa D'Este, 82 Jan Smuts Avenue, Saxonwold, Johannesburg | Built by Gordon Leith in 1922. Originally a Spanish style house, it was purchased in 1957 by architect David Morrison who then spent many years adapting it to resemble a Florentine villa, modelling it on the Villa D'Este in the Tivoli Gardens in Rome. From 2013 it was used as business premises for a Health Spa. | Johannesburg, Saxonwold | Johannesburg | Provincial Heritage Site | 26°09′36″S 28°02′09″E | Built by Gordon Leith in 1922. Originally a Spanish style house, it was purchased in 1957 by architect David Morrison who then spent many years adapting it to resemble a Florentine villa, modelling it on the Villa D'Este in the Tivoli Gardens in Rome. From 2013 it was used as business premises for a Health Spa. |
| 9/2/228/0126 | Gandhi House, 19 Albermarle Street, Troyeville, Johannesburg | Type of site: House | Johannesburg, Troyeville | Johannesburg | Provincial Heritage Site | 26°11′53″S 28°04′26″E | Type of site: House |
| 9/2/228/0136 | Pentecostal Protestant Church, Ray Street, Sophiatown, Johannesburg | Type of site: Church | Johannesburg, Sophiatown | Johannesburg | Provincial Heritage Site | 26°10′19″S 27°58′41″E | Upload Photo |
| 9/2/228/0137 | House of Dr Xuma, 73 Toby Road, Sophiatown, Johannesburg | Type of site: House | Johannesburg, Sophiatown | Johannesburg | Provincial Heritage Site | 26°10′34″S 27°59′00″E | Type of site: House |
| 9/2/228/0138 | 33 Toby Street, Sophiatown, Johannesburg | | Johannesburg, Sophiatown | Johannesburg | Provincial Heritage Site | 26°10′45″S 27°58′53″E | Upload Photo |
| 9/2/228/0139 | St Joseph's Children Home, Sophiatown, Johannesburg | | Johannesburg, Sophiatown | Johannesburg | Provincial Heritage Site | 26°10′37″S 27°58′40″E | Upload Photo |
| 9/2/228/0151 | Eikenlaan, 6 St Andrews Street, Parktown, Johannesburg | | Johannesburg, Parktown | Johannesburg | Provisional Protection | 26°11′00″S 28°02′05″E | Upload Photo |
| 9/2/228/0152 | House Gordon, 10-12 Seymour Road, Parktown, Johannesburg | Type of site: House. This is a large symmetrical three gabled villa, raised on a stone podium. The wide verandah which enfolds the house on three facades creates the Colonial or "homestead" quality. | Johannesburg, Parktown | Johannesburg | Register | 26°10′56″S 28°01′40″E | Upload Photo |
| 9/2/228/0153 | Stonehouse, 5 Rockridge Road, Parktown, Johannesburg | This house, which Sir Herbert Baker designed for himself in 1902, contributes to Parktown's exceptional architectural character. The use of natural building materials and fine craftsmanship make it a splendid expression of the arts and crafts movement in Type of site: House. This unique residence is situated in Rock Ridge Road. Sir Herbert Baker, the well-known architect of the Union Buildings, designed and had the house built for himself. | Johannesburg, Parktown | Johannesburg | Provincial Heritage Site | 26°10′42″S 28°01′56″E | This house, which Sir Herbert Baker designed for himself in 1902, contributes to Parktown's exceptional architectural character. The use of natural building materials and fine craftsmanship make it a splendid expression of the arts and crafts movement in Type of site: House. This unique residence is situated in Rock Ridge Road. Sir Herbert Baker, the well-known architect of the Union Buildings, designed and had the house built for himself. Media related to Stonehouse, Parktown at Wikimedia Commons |
| 9/2/228/0154 | Farmhouse, 14 Greenhill Road, Emmarentia, Johannesburg | | Johannesburg, Emmarentia | Johannesburg | Provincial Heritage Site | 26°09′48″S 28°00′30″E | Upload Photo |
| 9/2/228/0157 | Jan Smuts Study, Jan Smuts House, University of the Witwatersrand, Johannesburg | | Johannesburg | Johannesburg | Heritage Object | 25°53′18″S 28°13′55″E | |
| 9/2/228/0161 | Waverley House, 5 Murray Street, Waverley, Johannesburg | | Johannesburg, Waverley | Johannesburg | Provincial Heritage Site | 26°08′22″S 28°04′56″E | |
| 9/2/228/0164 | The Pines, Gordon Hill Road, Parktown, Johannesburg | The Pines was designed by J. C. Watson and completed in 1906 for the firm of Fraser & Chalmers Ltd, to accommodate the firm’s general manager, W. E. Park. Architecturally this dwelling-house is a good example of a Johannesburg Edwardian edifice. | Johannesburg, Parktown | Johannesburg | Provincial Heritage Site | 26°10′22″S 28°02′38″E | The Pines was designed by J. C. Watson and completed in 1906 for the firm of Fraser & Chalmers Ltd, to accommodate the firm’s general manager, W. E. Park. Architecturally this dwelling-house is a good example of a Johannesburg Edwardian edifice. |
| 9/2/228/0165 | Windybrow, Hillbrow, Johannesburg | This historical building Windybrow is one of the last remaining mansions in Doornfontein. It was used, inter alia, as a homestead, officer's mess in the Anglo-Boer War and as part of the first College of Nursing in South Africa. Windybrow was constructed ... | Johannesburg, Hillbrow | Johannesburg | Provincial Heritage Site | 26°11′21″S 28°02′57″E | This historical building Windybrow is one of the last remaining mansions in Doornfontein. It was used, inter alia, as a homestead, officer's mess in the Anglo-Boer War and as part of the first College of Nursing in South Africa. Windybrow was constructed ... |
| 9/2/228/0171 | Dutch Reformed Church, cnr Op De Bergen and Corrie Streets, Jeppestown, Johannesburg | The foundation stone of this church was laid on 5 May 1906 by General Koos de la Rey and the building was officially consecrated on 26 January 1907. The high steeple, the stained glass windows and the gables of this church are particularly imposing from a Type of site: Church | Johannesburg, Jeppestown | Johannesburg | Provincial Heritage Site | 26°12′06″S 28°04′10″E | The foundation stone of this church was laid on 5 May 1906 by General Koos de la Rey and the building was officially consecrated on 26 January 1907. The high steeple, the stained glass windows and the gables of this church are particularly imposing from a Type of site: Church |
| 9/2/228/0177 | Mandela House, Ngakane Street, Orlando West, Soweto, Johannesburg | Type of site: House | Soweto, Orlando West | Johannesburg | Provincial Heritage Site | 26°14′12″S 27°54′39″E | Type of site: House Media related to Mandela House at Wikimedia Commons |
| 9/2/228/0178 | Scott House, Kensington, Johannesburg | | Johannesburg, Kensington | Johannesburg | Provincial Heritage Site | 26°11′43″S 28°05′51″E | Upload Photo |
| 9/2/228/0179 | The Wilds, Houghton, Johannesburg | In 1925 the Johannesburg Consolidated Investment Company Ltd donated the original portion of The Wilds to the Municipal Council of Johannesburg, on condition that it be kept as an open space for the recreation of the public. Since 1936 The Wilds has been ... | Johannesburg, Houghton | Johannesburg | Provincial Heritage Site | 26°10′26″S 28°03′11″E | In 1925 the Johannesburg Consolidated Investment Company Ltd donated the original portion of The Wilds to the Municipal Council of Johannesburg, on condition that it be kept as an open space for the recreation of the public. Since 1936 The Wilds has been ... Media related to The Wilds, Johannesburg at Wikimedia Commons |
| 9/2/228/0181 | Hindu Crematorium, Brixton Cemetery, Johannesburg | Type of site: Crematorium | Johannesburg | Johannesburg | Provincial Heritage Site | 26°17′52″S 27°51′16″E | Type of site: Crematorium |
| 9/2/228/0188 | St Margaret's, 3 Rockridge Road, Parktown, Johannesburg | This mansion was designed in 1904 by Sir Herbert Baker. In 1930 and 1937 further additions were made, which were designed by Baker's former partner, F. L. H. Fleming. The house, which is built of dressed mountain stone, is situated in a spacious garden. | Johannesburg, Parktown | Johannesburg | Provincial Heritage Site | 26°10′41″S 28°01′56″E | Upload Photo |
| 9/2/228/0189 | Dorkay House, 5/7 Eloff Street, Johannesburg | | Johannesburg | Johannesburg | Provisional Protection | 26°14′56″S 28°02′08″E | Upload Photo |
| 9/2/228/0194 | Gereformeerde Church Hall, Troyeville, Johannesburg | Type of site: Church Hall | Johannesburg, Troyeville | Johannesburg | Provincial Heritage Site | 26°08′13″S 27°59′41″E | Upload Photo |
| 9/2/228/0195 | Randjeslaagte Beacon, Boundary Road, Parktown, Johannesburg | This beacon marks the northern boundary of the farm "Randjeslaagte" on which Johannesburg was laid out in 1886. The Randjeslaagte Beacon stands in Boundary Road, Parktown, just off Louis Botha Avenue, one of the busiest traffic arteries of Johannesburg. Type of site: Beacon. Historical interest. This beacon marks the northern boundary of the farm "Randjeslaagte" on which Johannesburg was laid out in 1886. | Johannesburg, Parktown | Johannesburg | Provincial Heritage Site | 26°10′53″S 28°02′56″E | This beacon marks the northern boundary of the farm "Randjeslaagte" on which Johannesburg was laid out in 1886. The Randjeslaagte Beacon stands in Boundary Road, Parktown, just off Louis Botha Avenue, one of the busiest traffic arteries of Johannesburg. Type of site: Beacon. Historical interest. This beacon marks the northern boundary of the farm "Randjeslaagte" on which Johannesburg was laid out in 1886. |
| 9/2/228/0196 | Outcrop of Main Reef Group of Conglomerates, Langlaagte, Johannesburg | Langlaagte lies about eleven kilometres from the centre of Johannesburg. In a memorial park adjoining the Main Reef Road one may still see the excavations on the claims of the discoverers of the Main Reef Group of Conglomerates of the Witwatersrand. | Johannesburg, Langlaagte | Johannesburg | Provincial Heritage Site | 26°12′36″S 27°59′16″E | Langlaagte lies about eleven kilometres from the centre of Johannesburg. In a memorial park adjoining the Main Reef Road one may still see the excavations on the claims of the discoverers of the Main Reef Group of Conglomerates of the Witwatersrand. Media related to George Harrison Park at Wikimedia Commons |
| 9/2/228/0197 | Paul Loewenstein Collection, University of the Witwatersrand, Johannesburg | | Johannesburg | Johannesburg | Heritage Object | 26°11′23″S 28°01′54″E | Upload Photo |
| 9/2/228/0198 | King Edward VII School, Houghton Estate, Johannesburg | This school was established as the Johannesburg High School for Boys towards the end of the Anglo-Boer War (1899–1902) and for a few years it was also known as the Johannesburg College. Type of site: School | Johannesburg, Houghton | Johannesburg | Provincial Heritage Site | 26°10′25″S 28°03′47″E | Upload Photo |
| 9/2/228/0201 | Yukon, Bezuidenhouts Valley, Johannesburg | This imposing dwelling-house was completed in about 1911 for T. F. Allen, a subsequent mayor of Johannesburg (1917–1919), and testifies to the high expectations initially cherished for this part of Bezuidenhouts Valley. | Johannesburg, Bezuidenhouts Valley | Johannesburg | Provincial Heritage Site | 26°11′11″S 28°04′34″E | This imposing dwelling-house was completed in about 1911 for T. F. Allen, a subsequent mayor of Johannesburg (1917–1919), and testifies to the high expectations initially cherished for this part of Bezuidenhouts Valley. |
| 9/2/228/0205 | Enoch Sontonga Memorial Park, Braamfontein Cemetery, Johannesburg | Type of site: Garden of Remembrance | Johannesburg, Braamfontein | Johannesburg | Provincial Heritage Site | 26°17′46″S 27°51′37″E | Type of site: Garden of Remembrance |
| 9/2/228/0205-001 | Grave of Enoch Sontonga, Enoch Sontonga Memorial Park, Braamfontein Cemetery, Johannesburg | Type of site: Grave Current use: Grave. | Johannesburg, Braamfontein | Johannesburg | Provincial Heritage Site | 26°17′45″S 27°51′36″E | Type of site: Grave Current use: Grave. |
| 9/2/228/0212 | Guild Cottage, Guild Road, Parktown, Johannesburg | | Johannesburg, Parktown | Johannesburg | Provincial Heritage Site | 26°10′52″S 28°01′06″E | |
| 9/2/228/0213 | Dysart House, 6 Sherborne Road, Parktown, Johannesburg | | Johannesburg, Parktown | Johannesburg | Provincial Heritage Site | 26°10′54″S 28°01′24″E | Media related to Dysart House, Parktown at Wikimedia Commons |
| 9/2/228/0216 | Bear Lodge, 17 Elm Street, Houghton Estate, Johannesburg | | Johannesburg, Houghton Estate | Johannesburg | Provincial Heritage Site | 26°10′28″S 28°03′37″E | Upload Photo |
| 9/2/228/0234 | Dias Cross, University of the Witwatersrand, Johannesburg | This remarkable historical relic stands in the library of the University of the Witwatersrand at Milner Park. It is the padra of Saint Gregory, erected by the Portuguese navigator Bartholomew Diaz on 12 March 1488, at Kwaaihoek near the mouth of the Bu Type of site: Beacon | Johannesburg | Johannesburg | Heritage Object | 26°11′26″S 28°01′46″E | Upload Photo |
| 9/2/228/241/1 | Women's Project: Lillian Ngoyi Grave, Avalon Cemetery, Soweto | | Soweto | | | 26°16′35″S 27°51′04″E | |
| 9/2/228/241/2 | Women's Project: Helen Joseph Grave, Avalon Cemetery, Soweto | | Soweto | | | 26°16′35″S 27°51′04″E | |
| 9/2/228/241/3 | Women's Project: Charlotte Maxeke Grave, Nancefield, Soweto | Statement of significance: The graves of Charlotte Makhomo Maxeke, Helen Joseph and Lilian Ngoyi is a tangible representation of their significant contribution to cultural development, education, cross-cultural exchange. | Soweto | Johannesburg | National Heritage Site | 26°15′41″S 27°53′41″E | Upload Photo |
| 9/2/230/0004 | Esselen Park, Training College Campus, Kempton Park | Type of site: Training College | | Kempton Park | Provincial Heritage Site | 26°02′05″S 28°14′58″E | Type of site: Training College Media related to Esselen Park at Wikimedia Commons |
| 9/2/233/0002-002 | Anglo-Boer War Blockhouse, Memorial, Krugersdorp | This stone blockhouse with its own distinctive design was erected by the British occupying forces during the Anglo-Boer War (1899–1902) Type of site: Blockhouse | Krugersdorp, Memorial | Krugersdorp | Provincial Heritage Site | 26°05′48″S 27°46′52″E | This stone blockhouse with its own distinctive design was erected by the British occupying forces during the Anglo-Boer War (1899–1902) Type of site: Blockhouse Media related to Anglo-Boer War Blockhouse, Krugersdorp at Wikimedia Commons |
| 9/2/233/0005 | Paardekraal Monument, Paardekraal Drive, Krugersdorp | Krugersdorp lies about 32 kilometres west of Johannesburg. Not far from the centre of the town, beside the road to Pretoria, is the Paardekraal monument, one of the most important monuments in South Africa. This monument marks the focal point of the First Type of site: Memorial | Krugersdorp | Krugersdorp | Provincial Heritage Site | 26°05′37″S 27°46′43″E | Krugersdorp lies about 32 kilometres west of Johannesburg. Not far from the centre of the town, beside the road to Pretoria, is the Paardekraal monument, one of the most important monuments in South Africa. This monument marks the focal point of the First Type of site: Memorial Media related to Paardekraal monument at Wikimedia Commons |
| 9/2/233/0010 | Old NZASM Station, George Norton Street, Krugersdorp | This railway station building with its richly decorated gable was completed in 1896 for the Nederlandsche Zuid Afrikaansche Spoorweg-Maatschappij. It is one of only a few elegant. station buildings erected for the NZASM and is an important link with the T Type of site: Station Building. | Krugersdorp | Krugersdorp | Provincial Heritage Site | 26°06′30″S 27°46′14″E | This railway station building with its richly decorated gable was completed in 1896 for the Nederlandsche Zuid Afrikaansche Spoorweg-Maatschappij. It is one of only a few elegant. station buildings erected for the NZASM and is an important link with the T Type of site: Station Building. Media related to Old NZASM Station, Krugersdorp at Wikimedia Commons |
| 9/2/233/0011 | Anglo-Boer War Blockhouse, Hekpoort, District Krugersdorp | The road from Krugersdorp to the north-west passes the Sterkfontein Caves and some miles further on runs through Hekpoort, a narrow kloof in the southern foot hills of the Magaliesberg Range. Type of site: Blockhouse | | Krugersdorp | Provincial Heritage Site | 25°53′02″S 27°36′58″E | Upload Photo |
| 9/2/233/0014 | Kitty Steam Locomotive, SA National Railway and Steam Museum, Krugersdorp | This well-preserved locomotive was manufactured in 1879 by the firm Kitson & Co. of Leeds, England, and was brought to South Africa shortly afterwards for service in the Natal Government Railways. It is the oldest working steam locomotive in South Africa Type of site: Locomotive | Krugersdorp | Krugersdorp | Heritage Object | | This well-preserved locomotive was manufactured in 1879 by the firm Kitson & Co. of Leeds, England, and was brought to South Africa shortly afterwards for service in the Natal Government Railways. It is the oldest working steam locomotive in South Africa Type of site: Locomotive |
| 9/2/233/0017 | Gladysvale, Uitkomst 499 JQ, Gauteng | Current use: Research. This series of fossil sites is one of the most important in the world for the study of human evolution in the context of changing ecological and biological processes. Collectively, they are of national and international significance | | Krugersdorp | National Heritage Site | 25°53′45″S 27°46′22″E | Upload Photo |
| 9/2/233/0018 | Drimolen, Sterkfontein 519 JQ, Gauteng | Current use: Research. This series of fossil sites is one of the most important in the world for the study of human evolution in the context of changing ecological and biological processes. Collectively, they are of national and international significance | | Krugersdorp | National Heritage Site | 25°58′08″S 27°45′22″E | Upload Photo |
| 9/2/233/0024 | Coopers, Zwartkrans 172 IQ, Gauteng | Current use: Research. This series of fossil sites is one of the most important in the world for the study of human evolution in the context of changing ecological and biological processes. Collectively, they are of national and international significance because they encapsula | Krugersdorp | Krugersdorp | National heritage Site | 26°00′46″S 27°44′49″E | Current use: Research. This series of fossil sites is one of the most important in the world for the study of human evolution in the context of changing ecological and biological processes. Collectively, they are of national and international significance because they encapsula Media related to Coopers Cave at Wikimedia Commons |
| 9/2/233/0032 | Bolts Farm, Sterkfontein 173 IQ (portion 32), Gauteng | Current use: Research. This series of fossil sites is one of the most important in the world for the study of human evolution in the context of changing ecological and biological processes. Collectively, they are of national and international significance | | Krugersdorp | National Heritage Site | 26°01′38″S 27°42′58″E | Upload Photo |
| 9/2/233/0032 | Bolts Farm, Sterkfontein 173 IQ (portion 38), Gauteng | Current use: Research. This series of fossil sites is one of the most important in the world for the study of human evolution in the context of changing ecological and biological processes. Collectively, they are of national and international significance | | Krugersdorp | National Heritage Site | 26°01′38″S 27°42′58″E | Upload Photo |
| 9/2/233/0032 | Bolts Farm, Sterkfontein 173 IQ (portion 12), Gauteng | Current use: Research. This series of fossil sites is one of the most important in the world for the study of human evolution in the context of changing ecological and biological processes. Collectively, they are of national and international significance | | Krugersdorp | National Heritage Site | 26°01′38″S 27°42′58″E | Upload Photo |
| 9/2/233/0033 | Motsetse, Tweefontein 523 JQ, Gauteng | Current use: Research. Twelve fossil sites in the Cradle of Humankind have been declared National Heritage Sites. Some of these have evidence of early fossil hominids including Australopithecines, Paranthropines and early Homo dating back to at least the last three million year | | Krugersdorp | National Heritage Site | 25°53′44″S 27°46′21″E | Current use: Research. Twelve fossil sites in the Cradle of Humankind have been declared National Heritage Sites. Some of these have evidence of early fossil hominids including Australopithecines, Paranthropines and early Homo dating back to at least the last three million year |
| 9/2/233/0035 | Plover's Lake, Kromdraai 520 JQ, Gauteng | Current use: Research. This series of fossil sites is one of the most important in the world for the study of human evolution in the context of changing ecological and biological processes. Collectively, they are of national and international significance | | Krugersdorp | National Heritage Site | 25°58′38″S 27°46′36″E | Current use: Research. This series of fossil sites is one of the most important in the world for the study of human evolution in the context of changing ecological and biological processes. Collectively, they are of national and international significance |
| 9/2/249/0001?? | Old School, Anderson Street, Nelspruit | This building, inaugurated on 22 May 1917, was the first school building to be erected in Nelspruit. It therefore occupies an important place in the history of the town's development. Type of site: School | Nigel | Nigel | Provincial Heritage Site | 26°12′29″S 28°02′37″E | Upload Photo |
| 9/2/258/ | 1 to 13 Artillery Road, Pretoria | Nos 1 to 13 Artillery Street were built during the nineties of the nineteenth century by the Government of the old South African Republic as homes for officers and non-commissioned officers. These houses form a unique architecture. | Pretoria | Pretoria | Provincial Heritage Site | 25°45′22″S 28°10′47″E | Nos 1 to 13 Artillery Street were built during the nineties of the nineteenth century by the Government of the old South African Republic as homes for officers and non-commissioned officers. These houses form a unique architecture. |
| 9/2/258/0001 | Old Arts Building, University of Pretoria, Pretoria | In the suburb of Brooklyn, more or less in the middle of the premises occupied by the University of Pretoria, stands the old Arts Building which looks very much like a cloister. The origin of the University of Pretoria goes back to the foundation of the TUC. The Old Arts Building is architecturally noteworthy and is symbolic of the origin of the University of Pretoria. | Pretoria | Pretoria | Provincial Heritage Site | 25°45′15″S 28°13′49″E | In the suburb of Brooklyn, more or less in the middle of the premises occupied by the University of Pretoria, stands the old Arts Building which looks very much like a cloister. The origin of the University of Pretoria goes back to the foundation of the TUC. The Old Arts Building is architecturally noteworthy and is symbolic of the origin of the University of Pretoria. Media related to Ou Lettere at Wikimedia Commons |
| 9/2/258/0002 | Dutch Reformed Church, Kirkness Street, Pretoria East, Pretoria | Type of site: Church | Pretoria, Pretoria East | Pretoria | Provincial Heritage Site | 25°45′12″S 28°13′18″E | Type of site: Church Media related to Ooskerk at Wikimedia Commons |
| 9/2/258/0003 | Hervormde Church, Du Toit Street, Pretoria | The corner-stone of this church building, which was designed in the style of the Dutch Renaissance, was laid on 18 July 1904 by General Louis Botha and the building was taken into use on 24 February 1905. Type of site: Church. | Pretoria | Pretoria | Provincial Heritage Site | 25°44′42″S 28°11′50″E | The corner-stone of this church building, which was designed in the style of the Dutch Renaissance, was laid on 18 July 1904 by General Louis Botha and the building was taken into use on 24 February 1905. Type of site: Church. Media related to Hervormde Church, Du Toit Street, Pretoria at Wikimedia Commons |
| 9/2/258/0004 | Northern Transvaal Command Headquarters, Voortrekkerhoogte, Pretoria | Type of site: Army Base | Pretoria, Voortrekkerhoogte | Pretoria | Provincial Heritage Site | 25°47′36″S 28°09′05″E | Upload Photo |
| 9/2/258/0006 | Nederlandsche Bank Building, Church Square, Pretoria | Designed by the Dutch architect, Willem de Zwaan the building was opened on 2 December 1897. The ground floor was used by the Nedelandsche Bank en Crediet Vereeniging while the first floor was occupied by the Zuid-Afrikaansche Fabrieken voor Ontplofbare Type of site: Bank Current use: Tourism Information. | Pretoria | Pretoria | Provincial Heritage Site | 25°44′49″S 28°11′14″E | Designed by the Dutch architect, Willem de Zwaan the building was opened on 2 December 1897. The ground floor was used by the Nedelandsche Bank en Crediet Vereeniging while the first floor was occupied by the Zuid-Afrikaansche Fabrieken voor Ontplofbare Type of site: Bank Current use: Tourism Information. Media related to Nederlandsche Bank building at Wikimedia Commons |
| 9/2/258/0008 | Staats Model School, Van der Walt Street, Pretoria | The dignified and striking building which housed the Staats Model School of the former Zuid-Afrikaansche Republiek, stands at the corner of Van der Walt and Skinner Streets in Pretoria. The development of education in the early rural community of the Transvaal... Type of site: School. The establishment of schools in general was in accordance with the education policy of the South African Republic, left to the parents. The government was then prepared to subsidise such schools. | Pretoria | Pretoria | Provincial Heritage Site | 25°45′00″S 28°11′37″E | The dignified and striking building which housed the Staats Model School of the former Zuid-Afrikaansche Republiek, stands at the corner of Van der Walt and Skinner Streets in Pretoria. The development of education in the early rural community of the Transvaal... Type of site: School. The establishment of schools in general was in accordance with the education policy of the South African Republic, left to the parents. The government was then prepared to subsidise such schools. |
| 9/2/258/0009 | Melrose House, 275 Jacob Mare Street, Sunnyside, Pretoria | This historic house is situated at No 275 Jacob Mare Street, opposite Burger’s Park. The part of Pretoria in the neighbourhood of Burger’s Park developed into the really fashionable area of the town in the 1880s. Here were the houses, for example, of G. Type of site: House. Melrose House is a good example of a Victorian manor house. The Peace of Vereeniging was signed in the dining-room of the house. | Pretoria | Pretoria | Provincial Heritage Site | 25°45′20″S 28°11′32″E | This historic house is situated at No 275 Jacob Mare Street, opposite Burger’s Park. The part of Pretoria in the neighbourhood of Burger’s Park developed into the really fashionable area of the town in the 1880s. Here were the houses, for example, of G. Type of site: House. Melrose House is a good example of a Victorian manor house. The Peace of Vereeniging was signed in the dining-room of the house. Media related to Melrose House at Wikimedia Commons |
| 9/2/258/0010 | Kruger House, Church Street West, Pretoria | Type of site: House | Pretoria | Pretoria | Provincial Heritage Site | 25°44′47″S 28°11′20″E | Type of site: House Media related to Kruger House, Pretoria at Wikimedia Commons |
| 9/2/258/0011zz | Government House, Bryntirion, Pretoria (General) – Query ??? | Type of site: Government House | Pretoria | Pretoria | Register – Query | 25°44′18″S 28°13′51″E | Upload Photo |
| 9/2/258/0012 | Cafe Riche, Church Square, Pretoria | Built on the site of the Old Post Office Bar, adjacent the Law Chamber Building. It was designed by Frans Soff being built in 1902. Anton van Wouw did the sculpture work. The ground floor had the Café Riche Lounge Bar. | Pretoria | Pretoria | Provincial Heritage Site | 25°44′47″S 28°11′17″E | Built on the site of the Old Post Office Bar, adjacent the Law Chamber Building. It was designed by Frans Soff being built in 1902. Anton van Wouw did the sculpture work. The ground floor had the Café Riche Lounge Bar. Media related to Café Riche (Pretoria) at Wikimedia Commons |
| 9/2/258/0013 | Law Chambers, Church Square, Pretoria | Designed by the Architectural firm, Philip, Carmichael and Murray, it was completed in 1893 for the African Board of Executors. It later housed the Transvaal Mortgage and Loan and Finance Company. | Pretoria | Pretoria | Provincial Heritage Site | 25°44′49″S 28°11′14″E | Designed by the Architectural firm, Philip, Carmichael and Murray, it was completed in 1893 for the African Board of Executors. It later housed the Transvaal Mortgage and Loan and Finance Company. |
| 9/2/258/0014 | 115 Charles Street, Brooklyn, Pretoria | | Pretoria, Brooklyn | Pretoria | Provincial Heritage Site | 25°46′01″S 28°14′03″E | Upload Photo |
| 9/2/258/0015 | Orange Court, Arcadia, Pretoria | Type of site: Flats | Pretoria, Arcadia | Pretoria | | 25°44′36″S 28°12′19″E | Upload Photo |
| 9/2/258/0016 | 3–5 Jacobus Naude Road, Voortrekkerhoogte, Pretoria | | Pretoria, Voortrekkerhoogte | Pretoria | Provincial Heritage Site | 25°47′35″S 28°08′29″E | |
| 9/2/258/0017 | Old Merensky Library, University of Pretoria, Lynnwood Road, Pretoria | Type of site: Library | Pretoria | Pretoria | Provincial Heritage Site | 25°46′05″S 28°17′06″E | Type of site: Library Media related to Ou Merensky Biblioteek at Wikimedia Commons |
| 9/2/258/0018 | Rooihuiskraal Battlefield, Verwoerdburg, Pretoria | This property forms part of the Rooihuiskraal Battlefield, where the Battle of Rooihuiskraal took place on 12 February 1881 during the First War of Independence (1880–81). During the war, Pretoria was besieged by Boer forces for a period of 100 days and Type of site: Battlefield. This property forms part of the Rooihuiskraal Battlefield, where the Battle of Rooihuiskraal took place on 12 February 1881 during the First War of Independence (1880–81). During the war, Pretoria was besieged by Boer forces for a period of 100 days. | Pretoria, Centurion | Pretoria | Provincial Heritage Site | 25°53′00″S 28°08′31″E | This property forms part of the Rooihuiskraal Battlefield, where the Battle of Rooihuiskraal took place on 12 February 1881 during the First War of Independence (1880–81). During the war, Pretoria was besieged by Boer forces for a period of 100 days and Type of site: Battlefield. This property forms part of the Rooihuiskraal Battlefield, where the Battle of Rooihuiskraal took place on 12 February 1881 during the First War of Independence (1880–81). During the war, Pretoria was besieged by Boer forces for a period of 100 days. Media related to Rooihuiskraal Battlefield at Wikimedia Commons |
| 9/2/258/0019 | Sammy Marks and Kynoch Building, Church Street, Pretoria | In 1903 William De Zwaan designed the Sammy Marks Building, this happened in the same time as the Tudor chambers on Church Square and the Saxon Chambers & the Afrik house in Paul Kruger Str. The shopfronts of this building reminds us of the Amsterdam 'gragtehuise'. In the North-western corner of the building, parts were removed to achieve installing underpinning bases in and outside of the gable wall as well as casting re-concrete into the wall, that was a highly complex process, completed without problems. | Pretoria | Pretoria | Provisional Protection | 25°44′45″S 28°11′40″E | In 1903 William De Zwaan designed the Sammy Marks Building, this happened in the same time as the Tudor chambers on Church Square and the Saxon Chambers & the Afrik house in Paul Kruger Str. The shopfronts of this building reminds us of the Amsterdam 'gragtehuise'. In the North-western corner of the building, parts were removed to achieve installing underpinning bases in and outside of the gable wall as well as casting re-concrete into the wall, that was a highly complex process, completed without problems. Media related to Sammy Marks house at Wikimedia Commons |
| 9/2/258/0020 | Old Synagogue Paul Kruger Street, Pretoria | Type of site: Synagogue | Pretoria | Pretoria | Provincial Heritage Site | 25°44′33″S 28°11′17″E | Type of site: Synagogue Media related to Old Synagogue, Paul Kruger Street, Pretoria at Wikimedia Commons |
| 9/2/258/0021 | Grootkerk, Bosman Street, Pretoria | The corner stone of this building, which was designed by Klaas van Rijsse and Kraan & Weijers in the style of the Dutch Renaissance, was laid by General Louis Botha on 11 May 1903 and the church was inaugurated on 30 September 1904.site: Church | Pretoria | Pretoria | Provincial Heritage Site | 25°45′05″S 28°11′09″E | The corner stone of this building, which was designed by Klaas van Rijsse and Kraan & Weijers in the style of the Dutch Renaissance, was laid by General Louis Botha on 11 May 1903 and the church was inaugurated on 30 September 1904.site: Church Media related to Grootkerk, Pretoria at Wikimedia Commons |
| 9/2/258/0022 | Tramshed, Van der Walt Street, Pretoria | | Pretoria | Pretoria | Register | 25°44′55″S 28°11′37″E | Upload Photo |
| 9/2/258/0023 | Old Raadsaal, Church Square, Pretoria | The old Government Building faces the south-western corner of Church Square; those who know Pretoria would find it difficult to imagine the square or the city centre without this building. It is the pride of the city and the architectural masterpiece of S Type of site: Hall. Historical Interest. This building was the Volksraadsaal of the South African Republic and was completed in 1892. | Pretoria | Pretoria | Provincial Heritage Site | 25°44′50″S 28°11′16″E | The old Government Building faces the south-western corner of Church Square; those who know Pretoria would find it difficult to imagine the square or the city centre without this building. It is the pride of the city and the architectural masterpiece of S Type of site: Hall. Historical Interest. This building was the Volksraadsaal of the South African Republic and was completed in 1892. Media related to Raadsaal Pretoria at Wikimedia Commons |
| 9/2/258/0025 | Staats Meisies School, Visagie Street, Pretoria | This historic school building was completed in 1899 as the home of the Staatsmeisieskool. In 1902 the High School for Girls was opened in the building and in 1930 it became the present Hamilton Primary School. Type of site: School | Pretoria | Pretoria | Provincial Heritage Site | 25°45′06″S 28°11′42″E | Upload Photo |
| 9/2/258/0026 | Mariammen Temple, Asiatic Bazaar, Pretoria | The Mariammen Temple is the oldest existing Hindu temple in Pretoria. The imposing gopuram, which was erected in 1939, is furthermore believed to be the biggest of its kind in South Africa. Type of site: Temple | Pretoria | Pretoria | Provincial Heritage Site | 25°44′27″S 28°10′34″E | Upload Photo |
| 9/2/258/0027 | Pioneer House, Silverton, Pretoria | This simple, picturesque, mud-walled, thatched cottage dates from the mid-nineteenth century and was built by the Transvaal pioneer David Botha. Type of site: House | Pretoria, Silverton | Pretoria | Provincial Heritage Site | 25°43′44″S 28°18′09″E | This simple, picturesque, mud-walled, thatched cottage dates from the mid-nineteenth century and was built by the Transvaal pioneer David Botha. Type of site: House |
| 9/2/258/0028 | Erasmus House, Erasmusrand, Pretoria | The Erasmus House was completed in 1903. It was the inspiration of Jochemus and Johanna Erasmus. The building was designed by Dutch architect Van Der Benn. The Italian builder, Monte Bello used mostly imported materials to complete the house. | Pretoria | Pretoria | Provincial Heritage Site | 25°48′57″S 28°15′43″E | The Erasmus House was completed in 1903. It was the inspiration of Jochemus and Johanna Erasmus. The building was designed by Dutch architect Van Der Benn. The Italian builder, Monte Bello used mostly imported materials to complete the house. Media related to Erasmus House, Pretoria at Wikimedia Commons |
| 9/2/258/0031 | Moerdyk House, 274 Pomona Street, Muckleneuk, Pretoria | Type of site: House | Pretoria, Muckleneuk | Pretoria | Provincial Heritage Site | 25°45′47″S 28°12′14″E | Type of site: House |
| 9/2/258/0032 | Fort Klapperkop, Groenkloof, Pretoria | These two very interesting forts are situated on koppies to the south of Pretoria. Fort Schanskop stands about one kilometre east of the Voortrekker Monument and can only be reached from the direction of that monument. Klapperkop, on the farm Groenkloof, Type of site: Fort | Pretoria, Groenkloof | Pretoria | Provincial Heritage Site | 25°46′49″S 28°12′37″E | These two very interesting forts are situated on koppies to the south of Pretoria. Fort Schanskop stands about one kilometre east of the Voortrekker Monument and can only be reached from the direction of that monument. Klapperkop, on the farm Groenkloof, Type of site: Fort Media related to Fort Klapperkop at Wikimedia Commons |
| 9/2/258/0033 | Barton Keep, Jacob Mare Street, Pretoria | According to V. Allen this imposing Victorian dwelling was erected in 1888. The original owner was E. F. Bourke, later the first mayor of Pretoria. Barton Keep is one of two remaining examples of the elegant houses that characterized this part of the then Mare Street during the late nineteenth century. | Pretoria | Pretoria | Provincial Heritage Site | 25°45′18″S 28°11′21″E | According to V. Allen this imposing Victorian dwelling was erected in 1888. The original owner was E. F. Bourke, later the first mayor of Pretoria. Barton Keep is one of two remaining examples of the elegant houses that characterized this part of the then Mare Street during the late nineteenth century. |
| 9/2/258/0034 | Brooks House, 109 Brook Street, Brooklyn, Pretoria | Brooks House was built shortly after James Brooks purchased the land that would form part of Brooklyn, Pretoria in 1886. James Brooks was partially responsible for the layout of the Brooklyn township. | Pretoria, Brooklyn | Pretoria | Register | 25°45′35″S 28°14′10″E | Brooks House was built shortly after James Brooks purchased the land that would form part of Brooklyn, Pretoria in 1886. James Brooks was partially responsible for the layout of the Brooklyn township. |
| 9/2/258/0035 | Austin Roberts Bird Sanctuary, Nieuw Muckleneuk, Pretoria | This unique sanctuary, where more than 170 different species of birds have already been recorded, provides a protected roosting place and breeding ground for thousands of birds within the city boundaries of Pretoria. | Pretoria, Nieuw Muckleneuk | Pretoria | Provincial Heritage Site | 25°46′16″S 28°13′40″E | This unique sanctuary, where more than 170 different species of birds have already been recorded, provides a protected roosting place and breeding ground for thousands of birds within the city boundaries of Pretoria. Media related to Austin Roberts bird sanctuary at Wikimedia Commons |
| 9/2/258/0036 | Leenhoff House, 799 Schoeman Street, Arcadia, Pretoria. | | Pretoria, Arcadia | Pretoria | Register | 25°44′51″S 28°13′11″E | |
| 9/2/258/0037 | Volksstem Building, cnr Pretorius Street and Volkstem Lane, Pretoria | | Pretoria | Pretoria | Provincial Heritage Site | 25°44′54″S 28°11′12″E | Media related to Volksstem building at Wikimedia Commons |
| 9/2/258/0038 | SA Air Force Officers' Club, Voortrekkerhoogte, Pretoria | This building was designed by Sir Herbert Baker and was completed in 1903 as the official residence of the commander-in-chief of the British forces in South Africa. The first occupant was General (later Sir) Neville Lyttelton. Type of site: Club | Pretoria, Voortrekkerhoogte | Pretoria | Provincial Heritage Site | 25°47′36″S 28°09′06″E | This building was designed by Sir Herbert Baker and was completed in 1903 as the official residence of the commander-in-chief of the British forces in South Africa. The first occupant was General (later Sir) Neville Lyttelton. Type of site: Club |
| 9/2/258/0040 | 14 and 15 Artillery Road, Pretoria | Nos 1 to 15 Artillery Street were built during the nineties of the nineteenth century by the Government of the old South African Republic as homes for officers and non-commissioned officers. These houses form a unique architectural series. | Pretoria | Pretoria | Provincial Heritage Site | 25°45′22″S 28°10′41″E | Nos 1 to 15 Artillery Street were built during the nineties of the nineteenth century by the Government of the old South African Republic as homes for officers and non-commissioned officers. These houses form a unique architectural series. Media related to Artillery Road, Pretoria at Wikimedia Commons |
| 9/2/258/0042 | Mea Vota, 62 Rissik Street, Sunnyside, Pretoria | A. Westenberg and C. van der Made, both engineers employed by the Netherlands South Africa Railway Company, built this imposing Victorian residence around 1899 for their own occupation. | Pretoria | Pretoria | Provincial Heritage Site | 25°45′17″S 28°11′56″E | A. Westenberg and C. van der Made, both engineers employed by the Netherlands South Africa Railway Company, built this imposing Victorian residence around 1899 for their own occupation. |
| 9/2/258/0043 | Anton Van Wouw House, Brooklyn, Pretoria | Type of site: House | Pretoria, Brooklyn | Pretoria | Provincial Heritage Site | 25°46′23″S 28°14′30″E | Type of site: House Media related to Van Wouw House at Wikimedia Commons |
| 9/2/258/0047 | Old Agriculture Publication Building, Vermeulen Street, Pretoria | | Pretoria | Pretoria | Provincial Heritage Site | 25°44′41″S 28°11′33″E | Media related to Old Agriculture Publication Building, Pretoria at Wikimedia Commons |
| 9/2/258/0050 | Pioneers House, Boekenhoutkloof, District Pretoria | | | Pretoria | Provisional Protection | 25°41′57″S 28°03′59″E | Upload Photo |
| 9/2/258/0051 | 3 Hazelwood Road, Hazelwood, Pretoria | | Pretoria, Hazelwood | Pretoria | Provisional Protection | 25°46′30″S 28°15′17″E | |
| 9/2/258/0055 | Zwartkoppies Hall, Zwartkopjes, Pretoria | Type of site: Hall | Pretoria, Zwartkopjes | Pretoria | Provincial Heritage Site | 25°43′53″S 28°13′08″E | Type of site: Hall Media related to Sammy Marks house at Wikimedia Commons |
| 9/2/258/0061 | National Cultural History Museum, Boom Street, Pretoria | Current use: Museum | Pretoria | Pretoria | Provincial Heritage Site | 25°44′20″S 28°11′24″E | Current use: Museum Media related to Ditsong National Museum of Cultural History at Wikimedia Commons |
| 9/2/258/0062 | Old NZASM Goods Office, Railway Street, Pretoria | The Netherlands South Africa Railway Company probably erected this building in 1896. It is the largest and best remaining example of an NSARC building in Pretoria. | Pretoria | Pretoria | Provincial Heritage Site | 25°45′27″S 28°11′25″E | Upload Photo |
| 9/2/258/0064 | Smuts House, Doornkloof, Irene, Pretoria | Field-Marshal the Rt Hon. J. C. Smuts, second Prime Minister of the Union of South Africa and a prominent figure in world affairs, lived in this house for a considerable part of his life. Type of site: House. Field-Marshal the Rt Hon. J C Smuts, second Prime Minister of the Union of South Africa and a prominent figure in world affairs, lived in this house for a considerable part of his life. | Pretoria, Irene | Pretoria | Provincial Heritage Site | 25°52′53″S 28°13′33″E | Field-Marshal the Rt Hon. J. C. Smuts, second Prime Minister of the Union of South Africa and a prominent figure in world affairs, lived in this house for a considerable part of his life. Type of site: House. Field-Marshal the Rt Hon. J C Smuts, second Prime Minister of the Union of South Africa and a prominent figure in world affairs, lived in this house for a considerable part of his life. Media related to Smuts House at Wikimedia Commons |
| 9/2/258/0065 | Pretoria High School for Girls, Park Street, Pretoria | The main building was erected in the Edwardian style in 1915. It is an outstanding example of a Milner school building. Type of site: School | Pretoria | Pretoria | Provincial Heritage Site | 25°44′56″S 28°13′48″E | The main building was erected in the Edwardian style in 1915. It is an outstanding example of a Milner school building. Type of site: School Media related to Pretoria High School for Girls at Wikimedia Commons |
| 9/2/258/0066 | Landing Site of the 'Voortrekker', University of Pretoria Experimental Farm, Pretoria | This site was part of the old Koedoespoort Aerodrome where Lieutenant-Colonel Pierre van Ryneveld and Flight-Lieutenant Quintin Brand landed for the first time in the Union of South Africa on 17 March 1920 during their epic flight of 46 days. Type of site: Vacant Site | Pretoria | Pretoria | Provincial Heritage Site | 25°44′32″S 28°15′22″E | Upload Photo |
| 9/2/258/0067 | Union Buildings, Meintjieskop, Pretoria | Type of site: Parliament | Pretoria | Pretoria | National Heritage Site | 25°44′26″S 28°12′42″E | Type of site: Parliament Media related to Union Buildings at Wikimedia Commons |
| 9/2/258/0069 | Weskoppies Hospital, Ketjen Street, Pretoria | This complex of seven buildings (construction of the oldest three commenced in 1904 and was completed in 1907) forms an orderly and imposing group of Edwardian buildings in a setting filled with trees. Type of site: Hospital | Pretoria | Pretoria | Provincial Heritage Site | 25°44′49″S 28°09′54″E | This complex of seven buildings (construction of the oldest three commenced in 1904 and was completed in 1907) forms an orderly and imposing group of Edwardian buildings in a setting filled with trees. Type of site: Hospital Media related to Weskoppies Psychiatric Hospital at Wikimedia Commons |
| 9/2/258/0070 | Rondegeluk, 570 Pretorius Street, Pretoria | This guesthouse building is older than 60 years of age and therefore protected by the National Heritage Resources Act (Act 25 of 1999). | Pretoria | Pretoria | | 25°44′46″S 28°12′27″E | This guesthouse building is older than 60 years of age and therefore protected by the National Heritage Resources Act (Act 25 of 1999). |
| 9/2/258/0072 | 1225 Felix Street, Mountain View, Pretoria | | Pretoria, Mountain View | Pretoria | Provincial Heritage Site | 25°42′02″S 28°09′55″E | |
| 9/2/258/0074 | Tudor Chambers, Church Square, Pretoria | Built in 1903, designed by John Ellis, a Scottish born architect. At the time of construction it was the tallest building in Pretoria. | Pretoria | Pretoria | Provisional Protection | 25°44′48″S 28°11′21″E | Built in 1903, designed by John Ellis, a Scottish born architect. At the time of construction it was the tallest building in Pretoria. Media related to Tudor Chambers at Wikimedia Commons |
| 9/2/258/0075 | 17 Ben Viljoen Road, Voortrekkerhoogte, Pretoria | | Pretoria, Voortrekkerhoogte | Pretoria | Provincial Heritage Site | 25°47′27″S 28°09′02″E | |
| 9/2/258/0076 | Lion Bridge, Church Street East, Pretoria | Lion Bridge was designed by the Department of Public Works of the South African Republic under the leadership of Sytze Wierda. It was built by the well-known J. J. Kirkness and officially opened by President S. J. P. Kruger on 11 June 1894. Type of site: Bridge | Pretoria | Pretoria | Provincial Heritage Site | 25°45′37″S 28°15′22″E | Lion Bridge was designed by the Department of Public Works of the South African Republic under the leadership of Sytze Wierda. It was built by the well-known J. J. Kirkness and officially opened by President S. J. P. Kruger on 11 June 1894. Type of site: Bridge Media related to Lion Bridge, Pretoria at Wikimedia Commons |
| 9/2/258/0078 | Kirkness House, 290 Cilliers Street, Pretoria | | Pretoria | Pretoria | Provincial Heritage Site | 25°45′50″S 28°12′10″E | Upload Photo |
| 9/2/258/0079 | Green Magazine, Pretoria | Type of site: Magazine. In 1894 orders were issued to build an ammunition magazine on the northern slopes of what would become Magasynheuwel (Magazine Hill). This magazine was called the Groen Magasyn (Green Magazine) and is still in very good condition today. | Pretoria | Pretoria | Provincial Heritage Site | 25°46′03″S 28°10′18″E | Upload Photo |
| 9/2/258/0082 | Pretoria Railway Station, Scheiding Street, Pretoria | Type of site: Railway Station | Pretoria | Pretoria | Provisional Protection | 25°45′28″S 28°11′20″E | Type of site: Railway Station Media related to Pretoria railway station at Wikimedia Commons |
| 9/2/258/0082-001 | NZASM Locomotive No. 242, Pretoria Station, Pretoria | This railway engine is displayed at the Johannesburg station. It belonged to the Nederldndsch Zuid-Afrikaansche Spoorwegmaatschappij (Netherlands South African Railway Company). It was the ideal of the Voortrekkers, right from the time they first settled Type of site: Locomotive. The locomotive and the private coach are important links in the history of the South African Railways. | Pretoria | Pretoria | Heritage Object | | Upload Photo |
| 9/2/258/0082-002 | NZASM railway carriage No. 18, Pretoria Station, Pretoria | Type of site: Railway carriage | Pretoria | Pretoria | Heritage Object | | Upload Photo |
| 9/2/258/0083 | Nedbank Building, Church Street, Pretoria | Type of site: Bank | Pretoria | Pretoria | Provisional Protection | 25°44′47″S 28°11′17″E | Upload Photo |
| 9/2/258/0084 | Fort Schanskop, Groenkloof, Pretoria | These two very interesting forts are situated on koppies to the south of Pretoria. Fort Schanskop stands about one kilometre east of the Voortrekker Monument and can only be reached from the direction of that monument. Type of site: Fort | Pretoria, Groenkloof | Pretoria | Provincial Heritage Site | 25°46′24″S 28°12′59″E | These two very interesting forts are situated on koppies to the south of Pretoria. Fort Schanskop stands about one kilometre east of the Voortrekker Monument and can only be reached from the direction of that monument. Type of site: Fort Media related to Fort Schanskop at Wikimedia Commons |
| 9/2/258/0085 | National Botanical Gardens, Brummeria, Pretoria | The Pretoria National Botanical Garden was founded in 1946 and today it contains one of the most important and comprehensive collections of indigenous flora in the country. The Garden is divided into 11 sections representing the major vegetation types of Type of site: Botanical Garden | Pretoria | Pretoria | Provincial Heritage Site | 25°44′11″S 28°16′39″E | The Pretoria National Botanical Garden was founded in 1946 and today it contains one of the most important and comprehensive collections of indigenous flora in the country. The Garden is divided into 11 sections representing the major vegetation types of Type of site: Botanical Garden Media related to Pretoria National Botanical Garden at Wikimedia Commons |
| 9/2/258/0087 | The Fortress and Blockhouse, 2 Johannes Kok Road, Voortrekkerhoogte, Pretoria | Die Vesting, which is one of the largest remaining wood and iron houses in Voortrekkerhoogte, was erected by the British military authorities shortly after the Anglo-Boer War (1899–1902). Since the beginning of the century it has accommodated several high Type of site: Blockhouse, Fort. Die Vesting, which is one of the largest remaining wood and iron houses in Voortrekkerhoogte, was erected by the British military authorities shortly after the Anglo-Boer War (1899–1902). | Pretoria, Voortrekkerhoogte | Pretoria | Provincial Heritage Site | 25°47′31″S 28°09′15″E | Upload Photo |
| 9/2/258/0088 | Burger's Park, Jacob Mare Street, Pretoria | This park, the history of which can be traced back to 1874, is the oldest park in Pretoria and forms an important green lung in the centre of the city. It was laid out in approximately 1890. | Pretoria | Pretoria | Provincial Heritage Site | 25°45′15″S 28°11′31″E | This park, the history of which can be traced back to 1874, is the oldest park in Pretoria and forms an important green lung in the centre of the city. It was laid out in approximately 1890. Media related to Burgers Park at Wikimedia Commons |
| 9/2/258/0093 | Defence Headquarters, Potgieter Street, Pretoria | The historic Machine Building, "Staatsartillerie" Stables and western portion of the Main Building were erected in the 1890s by the Government of the Zuid-Afrikaansche Republiek. The buildings form an important historical and architectural element. | Pretoria | Pretoria | Provincial Heritage Site | 25°45′10″S 28°11′00″E | Upload Photo |
| 9/2/258/0093/001 | State Artillery Stables, Defence Headquarters, Potgieter Street, Pretoria | Type of site: Stables | Pretoria | Pretoria | Provincial Heritage Site | 25°45′10″S 28°11′00″E | Upload Photo |
| 9/2/258/0093/002 | Old Machine Building, Defence Headquarters, Potgieter Street, Pretoria | | Pretoria | Pretoria | Provincial Heritage Site | 25°45′10″S 28°11′01″E | Upload Photo |
| 9/2/258/0095 3/3/8/1 | Cultural Artefacts from Mapungubwe and K2 Archaeological Sites, University of Pretoria, Pretoria | The collection of cultural artefacts associated with the Iron Age settlements on Mapungubwe Hill, the Southern Terrace, K2 and Bambandyanalo, situated on the farm Greefswald in the Messina District and at present in the possession of the University of Pretoria. | Pretoria | Pretoria | Heritage Object | | Upload Photo |
| 9/2/258/0097 | The Voortrekker Monument | This typically Art Deco monument is situated on a kopie south of Pretoria and is situated within a 341ha nature reserve. The Monument is surrounded by carefully manicured garden (within the laager wall). The slopes of the kopie have been planted with indigenous plant species. This site is named for the architecturally unique Art Deco Monument, of which the idea was first mooted by Pres. S.J.P. Kruger in 1888 and which was constructed between 1937 and 1949 with funds made available, inter alia by the then Smuts-government. | | Pretoria | | 25°46′35″S 28°10′33″E | This typically Art Deco monument is situated on a kopie south of Pretoria and is situated within a 341ha nature reserve. The Monument is surrounded by carefully manicured garden (within the laager wall). The slopes of the kopie have been planted with indigenous plant species. This site is named for the architecturally unique Art Deco Monument, of which the idea was first mooted by Pres. S.J.P. Kruger in 1888 and which was constructed between 1937 and 1949 with funds made available, inter alia by the then Smuts-government. Media related to Voortrekker Monument at Wikimedia Commons |
| 9/2/258/0100 | Transvaal Museum, Paul Kruger Street, Pretoria | Current use: Museum. The Transvaal Museum is a grand-neo classical building, extremely well detailed and forms an important group together with the Old Pretoria City Hall. It is a fine example of the work of an important colonial architect Mr. J. S. Cleland. | Pretoria | Pretoria | Provincial Heritage Site | 25°44′09″S 28°11′15″E | Current use: Museum. The Transvaal Museum is a grand-neo classical building, extremely well detailed and forms an important group together with the Old Pretoria City Hall. It is a fine example of the work of an important colonial architect Mr. J. S. Cleland. Media related to Transvaal Museum of Natural History at Wikimedia Commons |
| 9/2/258/0101 | Libertas, George Washington Boulevard, Bryntirion, Pretoria | | Pretoria, Bryntirion | Pretoria | Provincial Heritage Site | 25°44′21″S 28°13′39″E | |
| 9/2/258/0102-001 | 138 Gerhard Moerdyk Street, Sunnyside, Pretoria | | Pretoria, Sunnyside | Pretoria | Provisional Protection | 25°45′15″S 28°11′54″E | Upload Photo |
| 9/2/258/0103 | Brynterion Conservation Area, Bryntirion, Pretoria | Type of site: Conservation area | Pretoria | Pretoria | Provisional Protection | 25°44′15″S 28°13′57″E | Upload Photo |
| 9/2/258/0104 | Stone Cottage, Troye Street, Muckleneuck, Pretoria | Type of site: House | Pretoria, Muckleneuck | Pretoria | Register | 25°44′46″S 28°11′17″E | Upload Photo |
| 9/2/258/0105 | Oost-Eind Primary School, 70 Meintjies Street, Sunnyside, Pretoria | Type of site: School | Pretoria, Sunnyside | Pretoria | Provincial Heritage Site | 25°44′59″S 28°12′06″E | Upload Photo |
| 9/2/258/0110 | Burg House, Hillcrest, Pretoria | | Pretoria, Hillcrest | Pretoria | Provisional Protection | 25°45′23″S 28°14′29″E | Upload Photo |
| 9/2/258/0111 | The Kraal, Brummeria, Pretoria | In 1939 Jacob Hendrik Pierneef, the well-known South African painter, designed and subsequently constructed the building complex known as "Die Kraal". The remains of the old Bantu Kraal were found by Pierneef on the site. | Pretoria, Brummeria | Pretoria | Provincial Heritage Site | 25°44′31″S 28°17′05″E | Upload Photo |
| 9/2/258/0115 | Reformed Church, Church Street West, Pretoria | The cornerstone of this church building, which was designed in the style of the seventeenth-century Dutch Renaissance, was laid on 10 October 1896 by the State President S. J. P. Kruger. On 25 December 1897 the building was taken into use with an inaugural... Type of site: Church. Historical and architectural interest. The cornerstone of this church building, which was designed in the style of the seventeenth-century Dutch Renaissance, was laid on 10 October 1896 by the State President S. J. P. Kruger. | Pretoria | Pretoria | Provincial Heritage Site | 25°45′37″S 28°15′20″E | The cornerstone of this church building, which was designed in the style of the seventeenth-century Dutch Renaissance, was laid on 10 October 1896 by the State President S. J. P. Kruger. On 25 December 1897 the building was taken into use with an inaugural... Type of site: Church. Historical and architectural interest. The cornerstone of this church building, which was designed in the style of the seventeenth-century Dutch Renaissance, was laid on 10 October 1896 by the State President S. J. P. Kruger. Media related to Paul Kruger Church at Wikimedia Commons |
| 9/2/258/0115-001 | Kruger chairs, Reformed Church, Church Street West, Pretoria | According to tradition these church chairs were used during church services by President S. J. P. Kruger and his wife Gezina. The chairs are symbolic of Kruger's religious devotedness and an intimate reminder of the influence that his Christian principles Type of site: Chair Current use: Object. Historical interest According to tradition these church chairs were used during church services by President S. J. P. Kruger and his wife Gezina. The chairs are symbolic of Kruger's religious devotedness. | Pretoria | Pretoria | Heritage Object | | According to tradition these church chairs were used during church services by President S. J. P. Kruger and his wife Gezina. The chairs are symbolic of Kruger's religious devotedness and an intimate reminder of the influence that his Christian principles Type of site: Chair Current use: Object. Historical interest According to tradition these church chairs were used during church services by President S. J. P. Kruger and his wife Gezina. The chairs are symbolic of Kruger's religious devotedness. |
| 9/2/258/0120 | Magsa Flats, 734 Arcadia Road, Arcadia, Pretoria | Type of site: Flats | Pretoria, Arcadia | Pretoria | Provisional Protection | 25°44′54″S 28°13′01″E | Upload Photo |
| 9/2/258/0126 | Springbok Park, Schoeman Street, Hatfield, Pretoria | Springbok Park, formerly known as Grosvenor Square, was conceived in 1905 with the township planning of Hatfield, but the development of the park did not commence until the thirties. Since then it has been planted with indigenous flora. | Pretoria, Hatfield | Pretoria | Provincial Heritage Site | 25°44′43″S 28°14′09″E | Springbok Park, formerly known as Grosvenor Square, was conceived in 1905 with the township planning of Hatfield, but the development of the park did not commence until the thirties. Since then it has been planted with indigenous flora. Media related to Springbok Park at Wikimedia Commons |
| 9/2/258/0133 | Boiler and Blower House, Old Pretoria Iron Mines, Iscor, Pretoria | This simple brick building and chimney formed part of the iron installation of Cornelis Delfos's Pretoria Iron Mines Limited, where in 1918 cast iron from indigenous ore was produced on a large scale for the first time in South Africa. | Pretoria | Pretoria | Provincial Heritage Site | 25°44′16″S 28°08′57″E | Upload Photo |
| 9/2/258/0135 | Pretoria Boys High School, Pretoria | The foundation stone of the main building of this school was laid on 17 July 1908. The school was officially opened on 15 April 1909 by General J. C. Smuts, then Colonial Secretary of the Transvaal. These buildings are good examples of Edwardian architecture. Type of site: School | Pretoria | Pretoria | Provincial Heritage Site | 25°45′45″S 28°13′43″E | The foundation stone of the main building of this school was laid on 17 July 1908. The school was officially opened on 15 April 1909 by General J. C. Smuts, then Colonial Secretary of the Transvaal. These buildings are good examples of Edwardian architecture. Type of site: School |
| 9/2/258/0136 | Harvard Aircraft, South African Air Force Museum, Pretoria | Type of site: Aircraft. South African Air Force numbers: 7024, 7028, 2059, 7152, 7156, 7166, 7306, 7592, 7643 and 7661 | Pretoria | Pretoria | Heritage Object | | Type of site: Aircraft. South African Air Force numbers: 7024, 7028, 2059, 7152, 7156, 7166, 7306, 7592, 7643 and 7661 |
| 9/2/258/0138 | Arkleton, 852 Schoeman Street, Arcadia, Pretoria | | Pretoria, Arcadia | Pretoria | Provisional Protection | 25°44′48″S 28°13′22″E | Media related to Arkleton, Pretoria at Wikimedia Commons |
| 9/2/258/0154 | SA Army College, Voortrekkerhoogte, Pretoria | The corner-stone of the S.A. Army College Main Building, which was designed in the so-called blockhouse style, was laid by Lord Kitchener on 12 June 1902. It was the first permanent building in the then Roberts Heights (now Voortrekkerhoogte). | Pretoria, Voortrekkerhoogte | Pretoria | Provincial Heritage Site | 25°47′24″S 28°08′39″E | The corner-stone of the S.A. Army College Main Building, which was designed in the so-called blockhouse style, was laid by Lord Kitchener on 12 June 1902. It was the first permanent building in the then Roberts Heights (now Voortrekkerhoogte). |
| 9/2/258/0156 | Old Native Reception Depot, Proes Street, Pretoria | Type of site: Pass Office | Pretoria | Pretoria | Provincial Heritage Site | 25°44′37″S 28°11′17″E | Upload Photo |
| 9/2/258/0162 | Wierda Bridge, Six Mile Spruit, Centurion, Pretoria | The national road to Johannesburg crosses the Six Miles Spruit ten km south of Pretoria. The bridge by which it does so is known as the Wierda Bridge. It takes its name from Sytze Wierda, the Chief of Public Works of the Suid-Afrikaansche Republiek. This Architectural style: Sytze Wierda. Type of site: Bridge. Historical interest. This bridge was completed in 1891 by Sytze Wierda. Director of Public Works of the South African Republic | Pretoria | Pretoria | Provincial Heritage Site | 25°49′37″S 28°09′26″E | The national road to Johannesburg crosses the Six Miles Spruit ten km south of Pretoria. The bridge by which it does so is known as the Wierda Bridge. It takes its name from Sytze Wierda, the Chief of Public Works of the Suid-Afrikaansche Republiek. This Architectural style: Sytze Wierda. Type of site: Bridge. Historical interest. This bridge was completed in 1891 by Sytze Wierda. Director of Public Works of the South African Republic Media related to Wierda Bridge at Wikimedia Commons |
| 9/2/258/0165 | SA Mint Collection, Pretoria | | Pretoria | Pretoria | Heritage Object | 25°54′53″S 28°09′26″E | Upload Photo |
| 9/2/259/0001 | The Windmill, Olivedale, Randburg | Type of site: Wind Mill. This windmill was previously used to pump water for the Amsterdam Estate which was located here. Amsterdam Estate was established in 1943 by Mr H. Messias, a diamond dealer who emigrated from the Netherlands before the Second World War. | Randburg, Olivedale | Randburg | Provincial Heritage Site | 26°03′17″S 27°58′37″E | Type of site: Wind Mill. This windmill was previously used to pump water for the Amsterdam Estate which was located here. Amsterdam Estate was established in 1943 by Mr H. Messias, a diamond dealer who emigrated from the Netherlands before the Second World War. |
| 9/2/259/0003 | Darrenwood Dam and Koppie, Randburg | Type of site: Dam Water Supply | Randburg | Randburg | Heritage Area | 26°07′49″S 27°58′51″E | Upload Photo |
| 9/2/259/0004 | Hy-Many House, Boschkop, Randburg | | Randburg | Randburg | Register | 26°06′19″S 27°56′59″E | Upload Photo |
| 9/2/260/0001 | Jonkers House, Riebeeck Lake, Randfontein | | Johannesburg, Randfontein | Randfontein | Provincial Heritage Site | 26°12′15″S 28°02′50″E | Upload Photo |
| 9/2/260/0003 | Old Mining Commissioner's Post and Telegraph Office Building, 70 Market Street, Kocksoord, Randfontein | | Randfontein, Kocksoord | Randfontein | Provincial Heritage Site | 26°13′17″S 27°38′46″E | |
| 9/2/260/0004 | Old Police Station, Maugham Road, Randfontein | Type of site: Police Station | Randfontein | Randfontein | Provisional Protection | 26°10′45″S 27°42′22″E | Type of site: Police Station |
| 9/2/260/0005 | Tinktinkieland Nursery School, School Street, Randfontein | Type of site: School | Randfontein | Randfontein | Register | 26°10′20″S 27°42′31″E | Upload Photo |
| 9/2/260/0007 | Town Hall, cnr Struben and Sutherland Streets, Randfontein | Type of site: Town Hall | Randfontein | Randfontein | Provisional Protection | 26°10′57″S 27°42′01″E | Type of site: Town Hall Media related to Randfontein Town Hall at Wikimedia Commons |
| 9/2/260/0008 | The Homestead, 3 Homestead Avenue, Homelake, Randfontein | | Randfontein, Homelake | Randfontein | Provincial Heritage Site | 26°10′10″S 27°42′04″E | |
| 9/2/262/0001-001 | Confidence Reef, Kloof-en-Dal Nature Reserve, Kloof-en-Dal, Roodepoort | The Confidence Reef was discovered by F. P. T. Stroben on 18 September 1884 and there be and his brother, H. W. Stroben, mined the first payable gold on the Witwatersrand. The discovery of the Confidence Reef led to the flocking of prospectors. | Johannesburg, Roodepoort | Roodepoort | Provincial Heritage Site | 26°09′20″S 27°55′14″E | The Confidence Reef was discovered by F. P. T. Stroben on 18 September 1884 and there be and his brother, H. W. Stroben, mined the first payable gold on the Witwatersrand. The discovery of the Confidence Reef led to the flocking of prospectors. Media related to Confidence Reef at Wikimedia Commons |
| 9/2/262/0002 | Roodepoort Town School, Rex Street, Roodepoort | Type of site: School | Roodepoort | Roodepoort | Provincial Heritage Site | 26°09′32″S 27°51′54″E | Upload Photo |
| 9/2/262/0006 | Old Prison and Gaoler's House, Florida, Roodepoort District | Type of site: Gaol, Residence | Florida | Roodepoort | Provincial Heritage Site | 26°10′21″S 27°54′41″E | Upload Photo |
| 9/2/262/0013 | Old Pumphouse, Zuurbekom, District Westonaria | The Zuurbekom Pumphouse was erected in 1899 by the Johannesburg waterworks estate and exploration company limited and taken over by the Rand Water Board in 1905. Pumps housed in this building delivered the first continuous water supply to the central Witwatersrand and thus ended the chronic water shortages that had previously threatened public health and impeded development of the towns and gold-mines in the area. Water of consistently good quality has been supplied from the Zuurbekom wells without interruption since 1899. . Type of site: Pump House | | Westonaria | Provincial Heritage Site | 26°18′04″S 27°48′49″E | Upload Photo |
| 9/2/262/0014 | Old Municipal Chambers, Berlandina Street, Roodepoort | This building was designed by Charles Hosking and completed in 1906 as the first permanent office building for the Roodepoort-Maraisburg Municipality. It served this purpose until 1936. The western wing was designed by the firm Baker & Fleming and added i... Type of site: Municipal Building. This building was designed by Charles Hosking and completed in 1906 as the first permanent office building for the Roodepoort-Maraisburg Municipality. It served this purpose until 1936. | Roodepoort | Roodepoort | Provincial Heritage Site | 26°09′37″S 27°51′56″E | Upload Photo |
| 9/2/277/0002 | Vereeniging Country Club, Milani Drive, Vereeniging | Type of site: Club | Vereeniging | Vereeniging | Register | 26°42′16″S 27°54′39″E | Type of site: Club |
| 9/2/277/0007 | Anglo-Boer War Blockhouse, Witkop, Vereeniging District | This blockhouse is prominently situated on a low rise a few hundred metres to the north of the main road from Alberton to Vereeniging, a few kilometres south of the point where that road is joined by the road from Johannesburg. Type of site: Blockhouse | | Vereeniging | Provincial Heritage Site | 26°28′04″S 28°04′10″E | This blockhouse is prominently situated on a low rise a few hundred metres to the north of the main road from Alberton to Vereeniging, a few kilometres south of the point where that road is joined by the road from Johannesburg. Type of site: Blockhouse Media related to Witkop Blockhouse at Wikimedia Commons |
| 9/2/277/0011 | Dutch Reformed Church, Vereeniging | Type of site: Church | Vereeniging | Vereeniging | Register | 26°40′25″S 27°55′55″E | Type of site: Church Media related to Dutch Reformed Church, Vereeniging at Wikimedia Commons |
| 9/2/283/0001 | No. 4 Borehole and Pullinger Shaft, Venterspost Mine, Gemsbokfontein, Westonaria District | Type of site: Machinery | | Westonaria | Provincial Heritage Site | 26°15′14″S 27°38′41″E | Upload Photo |
| 9/2/287/0001 | Wood and Iron House, Akasia, Wonderboom District | This prefabricated verandaed cottage dating from 1907 is an unuswal example of a wood-and iron Transvaal farmhouse. The speed with which it could be unpacked and erected made it an ideal means of accommodating the owner in a short space of time. | | Wonderboom | Provisional Protection | 25°39′07″S 28°05′51″E | Upload Photo |
| 9/2/287/0004 | Steynberg Estate, Pretoria-North, Wonderboom District | | | Wonderboom | Provincial Heritage Site | 25°39′59″S 28°11′33″E | Upload Photo |
| 9/2/287/0005 | Veterinary Research Institute, Onderstepoort, Wonderboom District | This building was designed by the Transvaal Colony Department of Public Works and completed in 1908 as the centre of the then Bacteriological Laboratory at Onderstpoort. | | Wonderboom | Provincial Heritage Site | 25°38′53″S 28°10′50″E | Upload Photo |
| 9/2/287/0006 | Soutpan, Zoutpan, Wonderboom District | | | Wonderboom | Provisional Protection | 25°24′30″S 28°04′57″E | |
| 9/2/287/0008 | Wonderboom Nature Reserve and Fort, Pretoria | Type of site: Fort | Pretoria | Wonderboom | Provincial Heritage Site | 25°41′40″S 28°15′03″E | Type of site: Fort Media related to Wonderboom Nature Reserve at Wikimedia Commons |
| 9/2/287/0009 | Doors Erasmus Complex, Pretoria North, Pretoria | | Pretoria, Pretoria North | Wonderboom | Provisional Protection | 25°41′29″S 28°12′44″E | Upload Photo |
| | Minnaars, Danielsrust 518 JQ (previously 517 JQ), Gauteng | Current use: Research. This series of fossil sites is one of the most important in the world for the study of human evolution in the context of changing ecological and biological processes. | | Krugersdorp | National Heritage Site | | Upload Photo |
| | Heroes' Acre, Church Street Cemetery | The burial place of a number of historical figures including Andries Pretorius, Paul Kruger and Hendrik Verwoerd. | Pretoria | Pretoria | National Heritage Site | 25°26′41″S 28°06′10″E | The burial place of a number of historical figures including Andries Pretorius, Paul Kruger and Hendrik Verwoerd. |
