= Austin Roberts Bird Sanctuary =

South African bird sanctuary

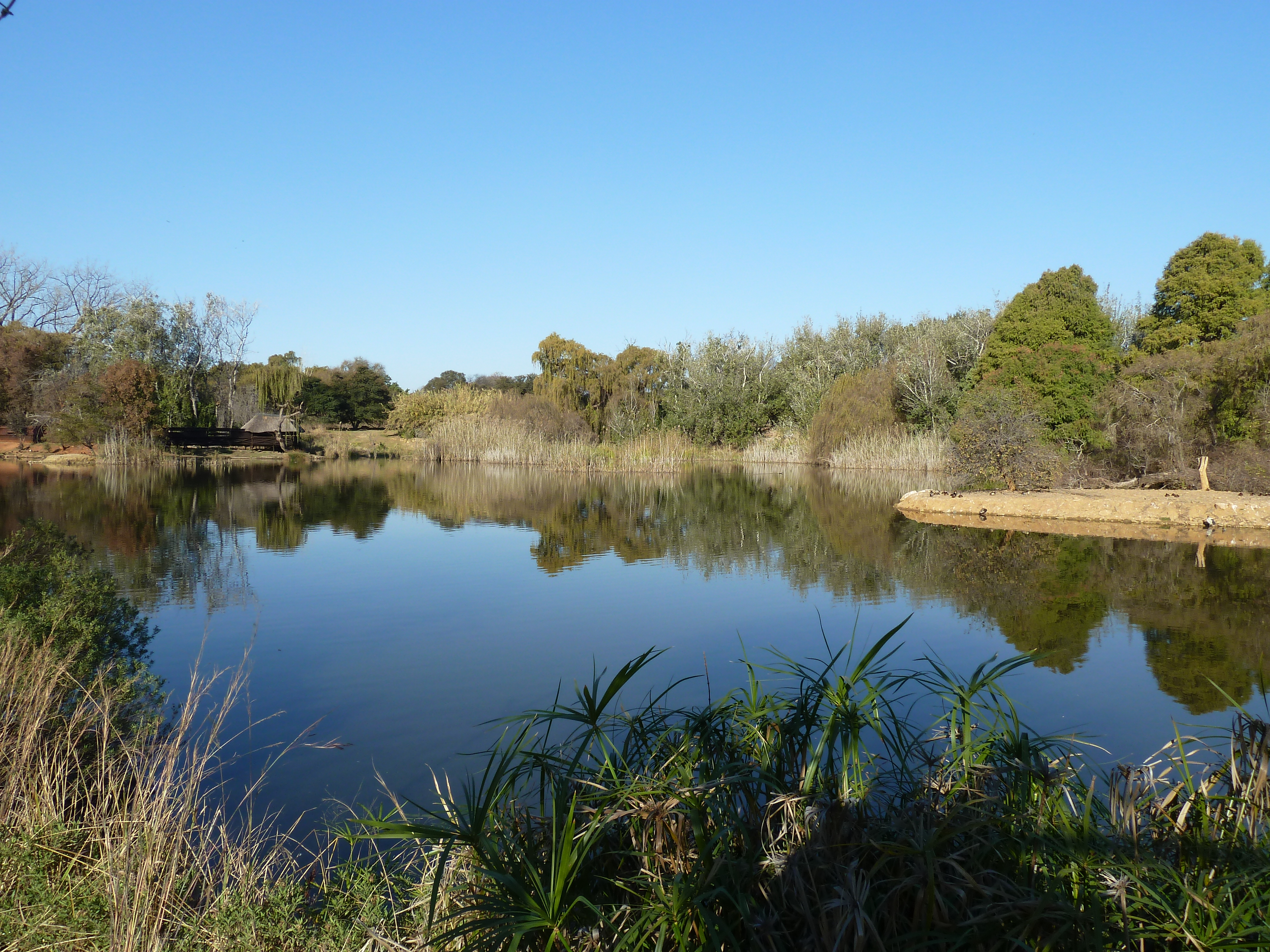
- View of the main dam
- Interactive map of Austin Roberts Bird Sanctuary
- Location: Pretoria, South Africa
- Coordinates: 25°46′13″S 28°13′40″E
- Area: 11.76 ha (29.1 acres)
- Established: 1956

The Austin Roberts (Memorial) Bird Sanctuary is a 11.76 ha (29.1 acres) nature reserve located in the Walkerspruit Open Space System, in the Nieuw Muckleneuk suburb of Pretoria, South Africa. It became the first bird refuge in Pretoria when it was opened by the then mayor of Pretoria, Mr. W. J. Seymore, on 27 October 1956. It was officially proclaimed as a nature reserve on 26 February 1958, and it was fenced in June 1970.

The sanctuary is named after South Africa's well-known ornithologist and mammalogist, J. Austin Roberts. He was born in Pretoria in 1883, but grew up in Potchefstroom as a minister's son, where the local amateur ornithologist, Thomas Ayres, was his mentor.

== Access ==
Free access is limited to the bird hide, which is reached from the northern perimeter, where a small exhibition facility is located. It has been declared a provincial heritage site due to its recreational and educational value.

== Habitat ==
A former clay quarry at the confluence of Walker and Argo Spruit was allowed to fill with water, and some exotic trees were planted along its verges. In addition nine small perennial dams or wetland basins have been created, some with artificial islands, to accommodate aquatic birds and animals. The natural veld type of the sanctuary is mixed bushveld.

== Mammal species ==
As of 2025 the reserve's mammals include 7 blesbok (including 2 calves), some 16 duiker and one male steenbok. The smaller antelope are hardly noticed due to the reserve's dense vegetation. Slender mongoose is present but is likewise a skulker.

== Bird species ==
Twittering of a box of little swifts circling over the sanctuary after sunrise

Upwards of 170 native bird species have been recorded, but the presence or breeding of some have been transient, due to urbanization and other factors. Resident or visiting passerine birds include thick-billed weaver, southern red bishop, common reed warbler, little rush-warbler and lesser swamp-warbler. Various heron species visit the reserve, including black-crowned night-heron, little bittern, green-backed heron, purple heron, black and little egret. Other regular water birds are red-knobbed coot, fulvous duck, Egyptian goose, white-faced duck, Cape teal and southern pochard. Pinioned crowned cranes and blue cranes have been released into the reserve, and some exotic duck species are present.

== Gallery ==
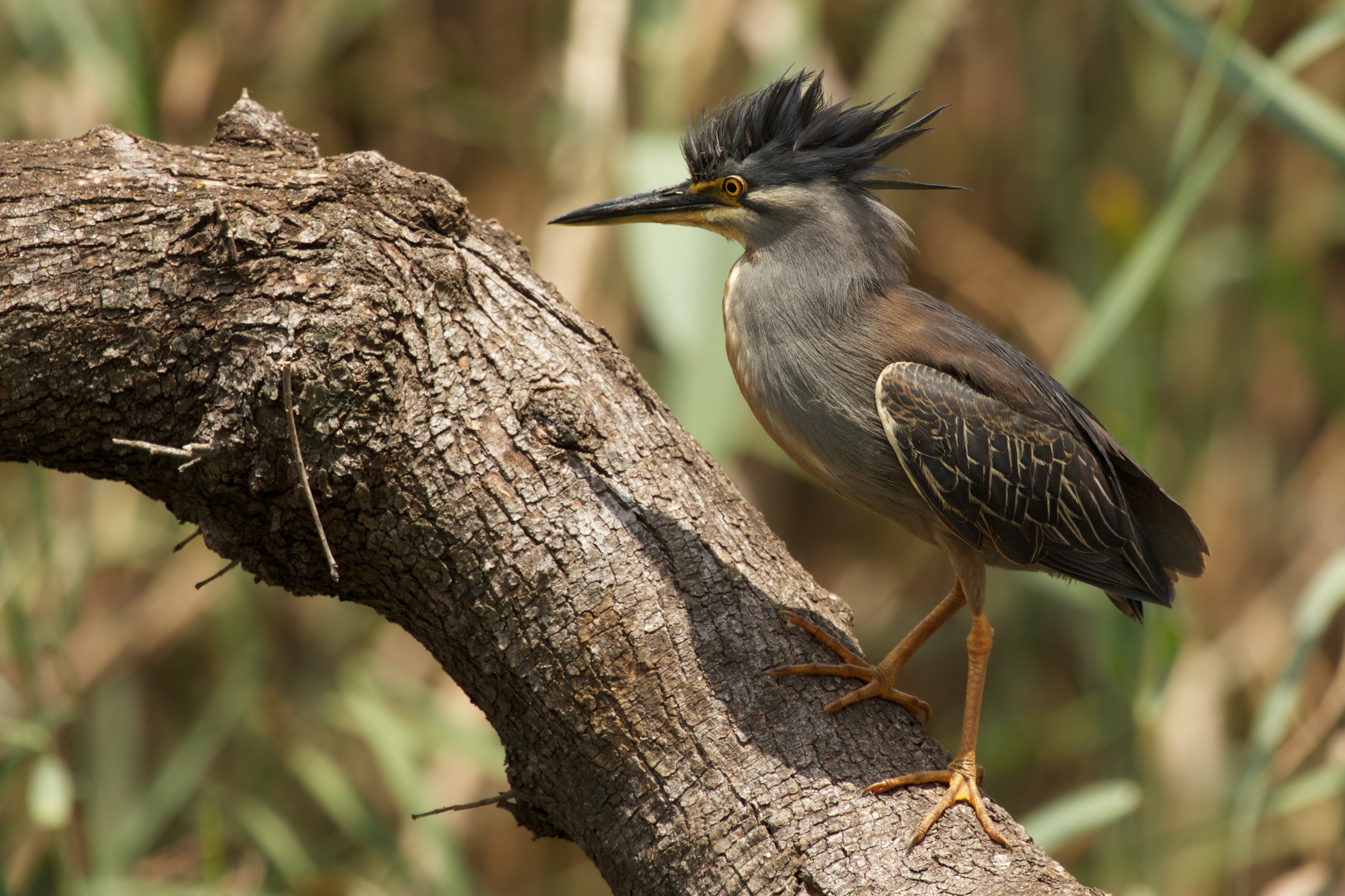
Striated herons are regular visitors to the sanctuary

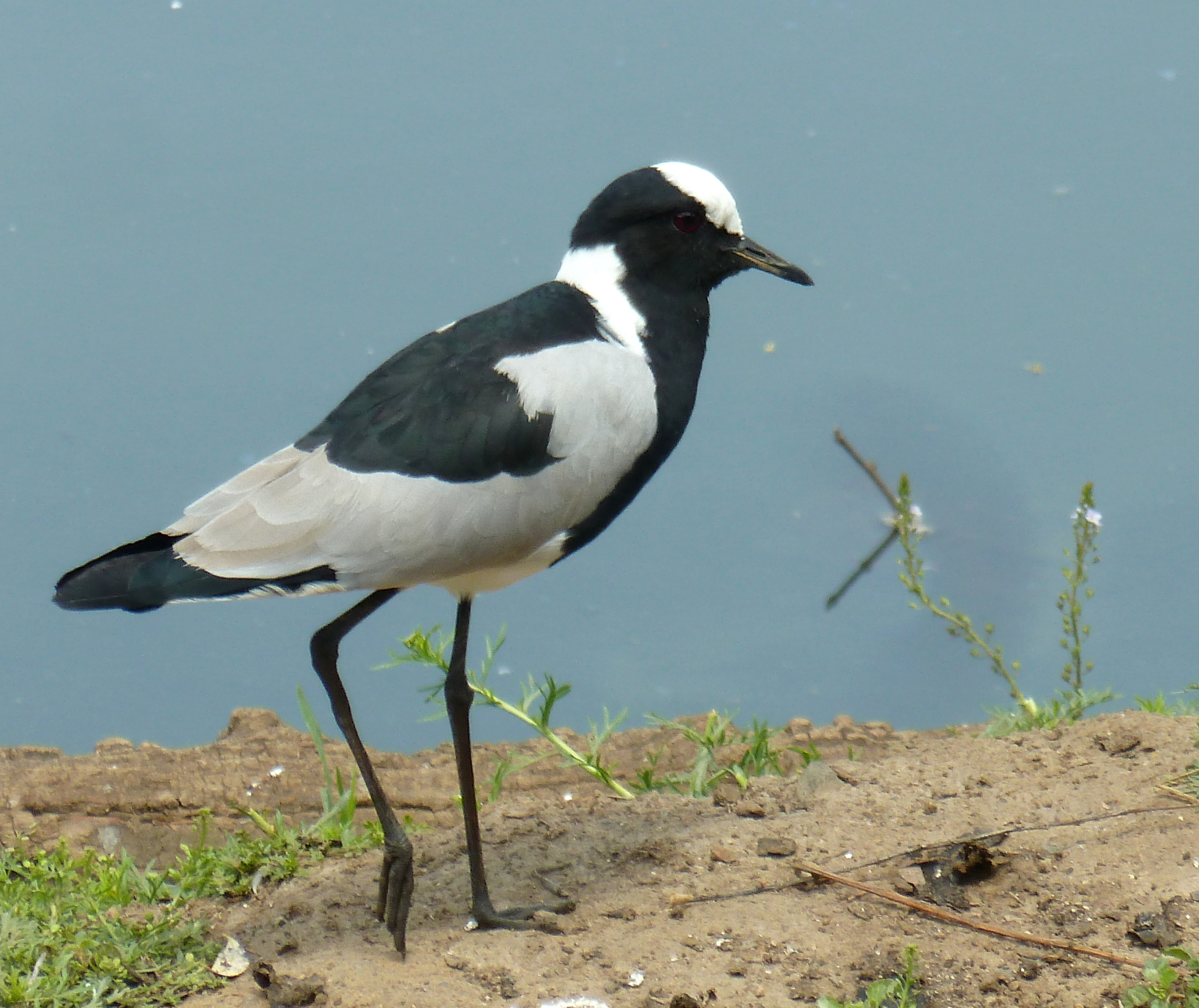
Blacksmith lapwing on the dam shore

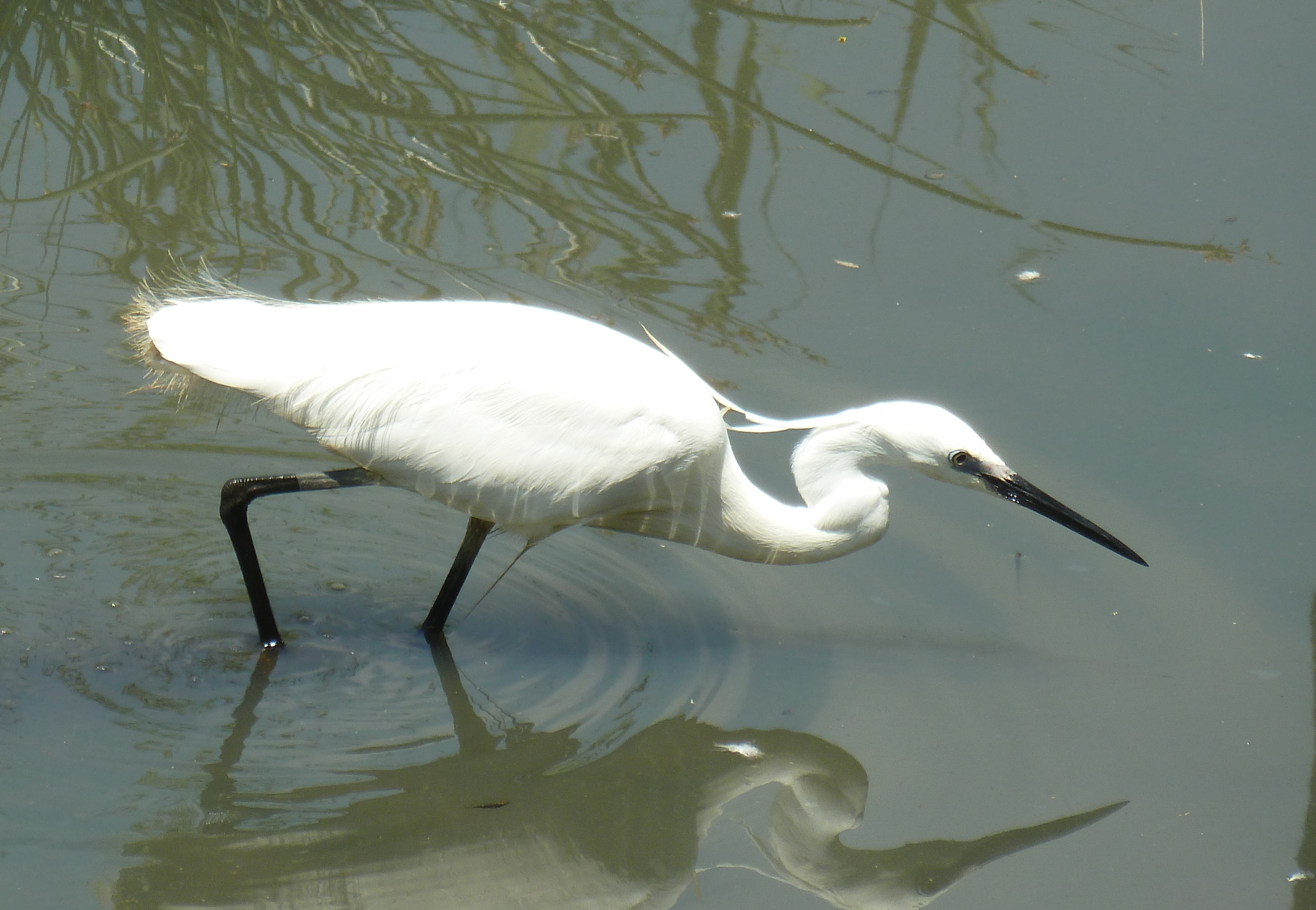
A little egret near the bird hide
