= List of cemeteries in South Africa =

Cemeteries in South Africa

This is a list of some of the more notable cemeteries in South Africa

== List of existing cemeteries ==
Name of the cemetery	Established	Town/City	Province	Remarks
Heroes' Acre	1867	Pretoria	Gauteng	Resting place of Paul Kruger, Andries Pretorius and Hendrik Verwoerd
Rebecca Street Cemetery	1904	Pretoria	Gauteng	Resting place of Louis Botha
Clouston Field of Remembrance		Colenso	KwaZulu-Natal	Cemetery and memorial to those fallen during the Second Boer War
West Park Cemetery		Johannesburg	Gauteng	Resting place of Nkosi Johnson as well as several well-known ANC veterans
Maitland Cemetery	1886	Maitland	Western Cape	First burial occurred in 1886. Also known as Woltemade Cemetery. Latitude: -33.91983, Longitude: 18.51476
Ambleside Military Cemetery		Estcourt	KwaZulu-Natal	A national heritage site
Avalon Cemetery		Soweto	Gauteng	Resting place of Hector Pieterson, Joe Slovo, and several well-known Apartheid heroes
Wagon Hill Cemetery		Ladysmith	KwaZulu-Natal	A national heritage site
Caesar's Camp Cemetery		Ladysmith	KwaZulu-Natal	A national heritage site
Cremorne Cemetery		Pietermaritzburg	KwaZulu-Natal	
Bethulie Concentration Camp Cemetery		Bethulie	Free State	A national heritage site
Winburg Military Cemetery		Winburg	Free State	A national heritage site
Legacy Parks - Wiesenhof Remembrance Park	2011	Stellenbosch	Western Cape	An eco-friendly site
The Preserve at Zilkaatsnek Wildlife Estate	2016	Hartbeespoort / Brits	North-West / Gauteng	A private memorial and truly natural burial cemetery
Tana Baru Cemetery	1804	Bo-Kaap	Western Cape	Served the Malay Muslim labourer community
The Preserve at Sampouri Estate	2011	Bela Bela	Limpopo	A private memorial and truly natural burial cemetery
Fourways Memorial Park by Calgro m3		Fourways	Gauteng	World-class Cemetery - open to the public
Nasrec Memorial Park by Calgro m3		Soweto	Gauteng	World-class Cemetery - open to the public
Vanderbijlpark Cemetery				
Evaton Cemetery				
Phelandaba Cemetery				
Vuka Cemetery				
Nanescol Cemetery				
Aberdeen Cemetery,			Eastern Cape	
North End Cemetery		Gqeberha	Eastern Cape	
South End Cemetery	1882	Gqeberha	Eastern Cape	
Paapenkuils Cemetery		Gqeberha	Eastern Cape	
Forest Hill Cemetery		Gqeberha	Eastern Cape	
Malabar Cemetery		Gqeberha	Eastern Cape	
West End Cemetery		Kimberley	Northern Cape	
Galeshewe North Cemetery		Kimberley	Northern Cape	
DuToitspan Cemetery		Kimberley	Northern Cape	
Kimberley Muslim Cemetery		Kimberley	Northern Cape	
Roodepan Cemetery		Kimberley	Northern Cape	
M.O.T.H. Garden of rememberence		Kimberley	Northern Cape	
