= Heroes' Acre, Pretoria =

Cemetery in South Africa

Heroes' Acre Cemetery
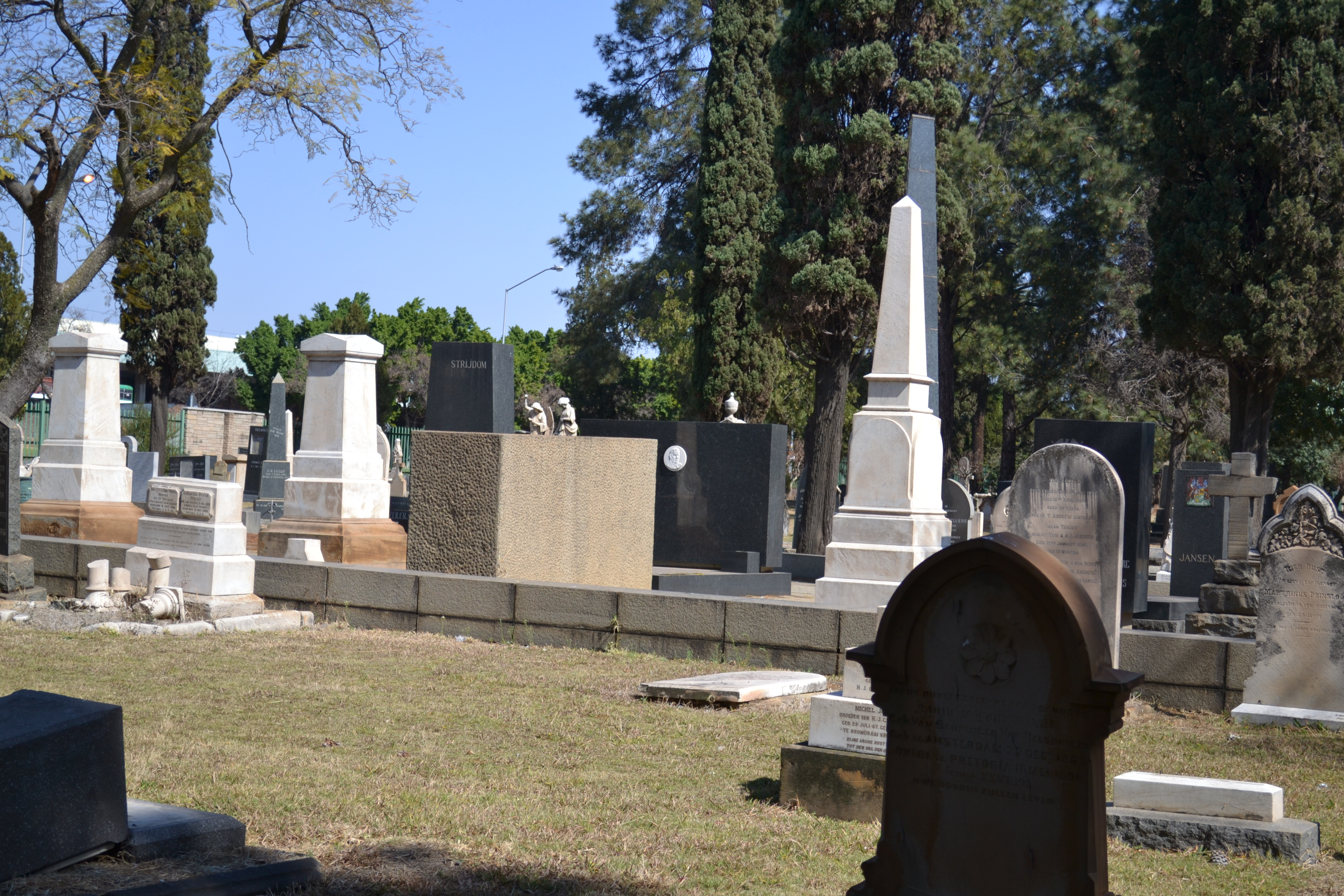
- Interactive map of Heroes' Acre Cemetery

Details
- Established: 1867
- Location: c/o Church Street and DF Malan Drive in Pretoria
- Country: South Africa
- Coordinates: 25°44′47″S 28°10′29″E
- Owned by: City of Tshwane

The Heroes' Acre (Afrikaans: Die Heldeakker; Dutch: De Heldenakker) is a section of Church Street Cemetery in Pretoria, South Africa. It was established in 1867, and contains the graves of renowned citizens and public figures. It is the burial place of a number of historical figures including Andries Pretorius, Paul Kruger and Hendrik Verwoerd. Australian Boer War war criminal Harry "Breaker" Morant (executed by the British for war crimes during the Second Anglo-Boer War) is also buried here.

== History ==
The first burials took place in 1867. In 1973, Tom Andrews (with the assistance of the Girl Guides) was the first surveyor of the cemetery. He documented all graves and later published it as a book called "Pioneer Sketches" (May 1983)

== Location and description ==
The Church Street Cemetery is located in Pretoria on the corner of WF Nkomo (Former Church Street) and Eskia M'phahlele drive (Former DF Malan Drive). The central part of this historic cemetery is known as The Heroes' Acre. The cemetery is a vast green field filled with tombstones of diverse shapes and styles which are organized in rows. As this is a Christian cemetery, the graves are oriented facing east. Trees and shrubbery give the cemetery a calm feel. The silver crosses in The Heroes' Acre are significant and distinctive of the cemetery.

The Heroes' Acre is listed as a heritage site.

== Interments ==
=== South African Republic ===
- Andries Pretorius – (1st Chairman of the United Volksraad. Reburied in the cemetery in May 1891 as die eerste held wat in die akker begrawe is ["the first hero who is buried in the acre"])
- Stephanus Schoeman – (2nd President of the South African Republic)
- Willem Cornelis Janse van Rensburg – (3rd President of the South African Republic)
- Thomas François Burgers – (4th President of the South African Republic)
  - Mary Bryson – (Wife of Thomas François Burgers)
- Paul Kruger – (5th President of the South African Republic)

=== Union and Republic of South Africa ===
- Johannes Gerhardus Strijdom – (5th Prime Minister of South Africa) and his wife Susan Strijdom (née De Klerk)
- Hendrik Frensch Verwoerd – (6th Prime Minister of South Africa)

=== Others ===
- Eugène Marais – (South African lawyer, naturalist, poet, and writer)
- Ernest George Jansen – (second to last Governor-General of the Union of South Africa from 1951 to 1959)
- Harry Harbord "Breaker" Morant – (Anglo-Australian drover, horseman, poet, soldier, convicted war criminal) - executed by firing squad

== See also ==
- List of cemeteries in South Africa
- List of heritage sites in Gauteng
