= Cabinet of Kgalema Motlanthe =

Motlanthe Cabinet
- 4th Cabinet of the Republic of South Africa (since the 1994 election)
- 2008–2009
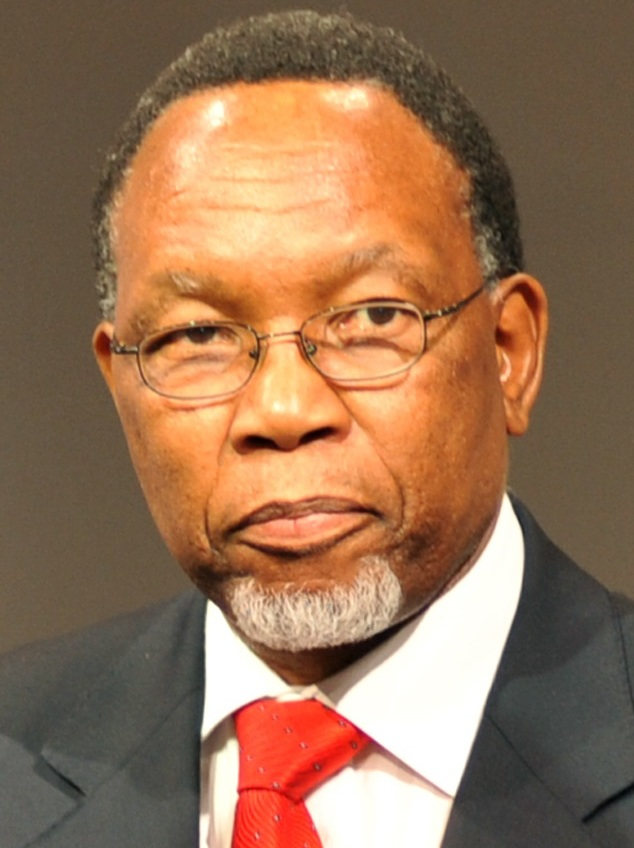
- Kgalema Motlanthe (2009)
- Date formed: 25 September 2008
- Date dissolved: 9 May 2009 (7 months and 14 days)

People and organisations
- President: Kgalema Motlanthe
- Deputy President: Baleka Mbete
- No. of ministers: 28 ministers
- Member parties: African National Congress; Azanian People's Organisation
- Status in legislature: Majority
- Opposition parties: Democratic Alliance
- Opposition leaders: Sandra Botha

History
- Election: 2004 election
- Legislature term: Third Parliament
- Predecessor: Mbeki II
- Successor: Zuma I

The cabinet of Kgalema Motlanthe was the cabinet of the government of South Africa between 25 September 2008 and 9 May 2009. It was constituted by Motlanthe after his election on 24 September and served until after the April 2009 general election. It replaced the cabinet of former President Thabo Mbeki, who had resigned from office at the instruction of his political party.

== History ==
On 25 September 2008, the day after Thabo Mbeki's resignation, Kgalema Motlanthe was indirectly elected as the third President of South Africa. He was inaugurated as president later the same day, and he announced his new cabinet during his inauguration speech. Because he was expected to serve only until the 2009 general election, Motlanthe's cabinet was widely referred to as a caretaker government.

Motlanthe retained many of the ministers who had served in Mbeki's cabinet, but Mbeki's departure had precipitated a wave of ministerial resignations that necessitated new appointments. Baleka Mbete was newly appointed as Deputy President of South Africa, replacing Phumzile Mlambo-Ngcuka, and seven new ministers joined the cabinet. Four replaced ministers who had resigned: Richard Baloyi replaced Geraldine Fraser-Moleketi, Siyabonga Cwele replaced Ronnie Kasrils, Sicelo Shiceka replaced Sydney Mufamadi, and Geoff Doidge replaced Thoko Didiza. Three other new ministers – Barbara Hogan, Nathi Mthethwa, and Enver Surty – replaced ministers who were reassigned to new portfolios in order to compensate for additional resignations. The reassigned ministers were Manto Tshabalala-Msimang, Charles Nqakula, and Brigitte Mabandla, who replaced, respectively, Essop Pahad, Mosiuoa Lekota, and Alec Erwin. Tshabalala-Msimang's departure from the Ministry of Health received international attention because of her notorious mishandling of the HIV/AIDS epidemic.

During his seven-month presidency, Motlanthe did not effect any cabinet reshuffles. Minister Ivy Matsepe-Casaburri died on 6 April 2009, a fortnight before the general election, and Minister Tshabalala-Msimang took over her Communications portfolio in an acting capacity.

== List of ministers ==
Portfolio	Minister	Took office	Left office	Party
President of South Africa	Kgalema Motlanthe	25 September 2008	9 May 2009	ANC
Deputy President of South Africa	Baleka Mbete	25 September 2008	9 May 2009	ANC
Minister in the Presidency	Manto Tshabalala-Msimang	25 September 2008	9 May 2009	ANC
Minister of Agriculture and Land Affairs	Lulama Xingwana	25 September 2008	9 May 2009	ANC
Minister of Arts and Culture	Pallo Jordan	25 September 2008	9 May 2009	ANC
Minister of Communications	Ivy Matsepe-Casaburri	25 September 2008	6 April 2009	ANC
Minister of Correctional Services	Ngconde Balfour	25 September 2008	9 May 2009	ANC
Minister of Defence	Charles Nqakula	25 September 2008	9 May 2009	ANC
Minister of Education	Naledi Pandor	25 September 2008	9 May 2009	ANC
Minister of Environmental Affairs and Tourism	Marthinus van Schalkwyk	25 September 2008	9 May 2009	ANC
Minister of Finance	Trevor Manuel	25 September 2008	9 May 2009	ANC
Minister of Foreign Affairs	Nkosazana Dlamini-Zuma	25 September 2008	9 May 2009	ANC
Minister of Health	Barbara Hogan	25 September 2008	9 May 2009	ANC
Minister of Home Affairs	Nosiviwe Mapisa-Nqakula	25 September 2008	9 May 2009	ANC
Minister of Housing	Lindiwe Sisulu	25 September 2008	9 May 2009	ANC
Minister of Intelligence	Siyabonga Cwele	25 September 2008	9 May 2009	ANC
Minister of Justice and Constitutional Development	Enver Surty	25 September 2008	9 May 2009	ANC
Minister of Labour	Membathisi Mdladlana	25 September 2008	9 May 2009	ANC
Minister of Minerals and Energy	Buyelwa Sonjica	25 September 2008	9 May 2009	ANC
Minister of Provincial and Local Government	Sicelo Shiceka	25 September 2008	9 May 2009	ANC
Minister of Public Enterprises	Brigitte Mabandla	25 September 2008	9 May 2009	ANC
Minister of Public Service and Administration	Richard Baloyi	25 September 2008	9 May 2009	ANC
Minister of Public Works	Geoff Doidge	25 September 2008	9 May 2009	ANC
Minister of Safety and Security	Nathi Mthethwa	25 September 2008	9 May 2009	ANC
Minister of Science and Technology	Mosibudi Mangena	25 September 2008	9 May 2009	AZAPO
Minister of Social Development	Zola Skweyiya	25 September 2008	9 May 2009	ANC
Minister of Sport and Recreation	Makhenkesi Stofile	25 September 2008	9 May 2009	ANC
Minister of Trade and Industry	Mandisi Mpahlwa	25 September 2008	9 May 2009	ANC
Minister of Transport	Jeff Radebe	25 September 2008	9 May 2009	ANC
Minister of Water Affairs and Forestry	Lindiwe Hendricks	25 September 2008	9 May 2009	ANC

== List of deputy ministers ==
Although deputy ministers are not members of the South African Cabinet, they are appointed by the president and assist cabinet ministers in the execution of their duties. Motlanthe's deputy ministers were, like his ministers, appointed on 25 September 2008. Motlanthe appointed only two new deputy ministers on 25 September: Molefi Sefularo, to fill a longstanding vacancy in the office of the Deputy Minister of Health, and Fezile Bhengu, to replace Mluleki George as Deputy Minister of Defence.

After a short delay, on 5 November he appointed Nhlanhla Nene to the position of Deputy Minister of Finance, which had been vacated by Jabu Moleketi's resignation in September. On the same day, he appointed André Gaum to the vacant position of Deputy Minister of Education (held by Minister Surty until September) and created a new position of third Deputy Minister of Foreign Affairs for Fatima Hajaig. Motlanthe did not appoint deputy ministers in the Ministries of Housing, Intelligence, Labour, Minerals and Energy, Public Enterprises, Public Service and Administration, Transport, or Water Affairs, nor did he appoint a deputy minister in the Presidency.

Portfolio	Minister	Took office	Left office	Party
Deputy Minister of Agriculture and Land Affairs	Dirk du Toit	25 September 2008	9 May 2009	ANC
Deputy Minister of Arts and Culture	Ntombazana Botha	25 September 2008	9 May 2009	ANC
Deputy Minister of Communications	Roy Padayachie	25 September 2008	9 May 2009	ANC
Deputy Minister of Correctional Services	Loretta Jacobus	25 September 2008	9 May 2009	ANC
Deputy Minister of Defence	Fezile Bhengu	25 September 2008	9 May 2009	ANC
Deputy Minister of Education	André Gaum	5 November 2008	9 May 2009	ANC
Deputy Minister of Environmental Affairs and Tourism	Rejoice Mabudafhasi	25 September 2008	9 May 2009	ANC
Deputy Minister of Finance	Nhlanhla Nene	5 November 2008	9 May 2009	ANC
Deputy Minister of Foreign Affairs	Aziz Pahad	25 September 2008	9 May 2009	ANC
Deputy Minister of Foreign Affairs	Sue van der Merwe	25 September 2008	9 May 2009	ANC
Deputy Minister of Foreign Affairs	Fatima Hajaig	5 November 2008	9 May 2009	ANC
Deputy Minister of Health	Molefi Sefularo	25 September 2008	9 May 2009	ANC
Deputy Minister of Home Affairs	Malusi Gigaba	25 September 2008	9 May 2009	ANC
Deputy Minister of Justice and Constitutional Development	Johnny de Lange	25 September 2008	9 May 2009	ANC
Deputy Minister of Provincial and Local Government	Nomatyala Hangana	25 September 2008	9 May 2009	ANC
Deputy Minister of Public Works	Ntopile Kganyago	25 September 2008	9 May 2009	UDM
Deputy Minister of Safety and Security	Susan Shabangu	25 September 2008	9 May 2009	ANC
Deputy Minister of Science and Technology	Derek Hanekom	25 September 2008	9 May 2009	ANC
Deputy Minister of Social Development	Jean Swanson-Jacobs	25 September 2008	9 May 2009	ANC
Deputy Minister of Sport and Recreation	Gert Oosthuizen	25 September 2008	9 May 2009	ANC
Deputy Minister of Trade and Industry	Rob Davies	25 September 2008	9 May 2009	ANC
Deputy Minister of Trade and Industry	Elizabeth Thabethe	25 September 2008	9 May 2009	ANC
