= Second cabinet of Thabo Mbeki =

Second Mbeki Cabinet
- 3rd Cabinet of the Republic of South Africa (since the 1994 election)
- 2004–2008
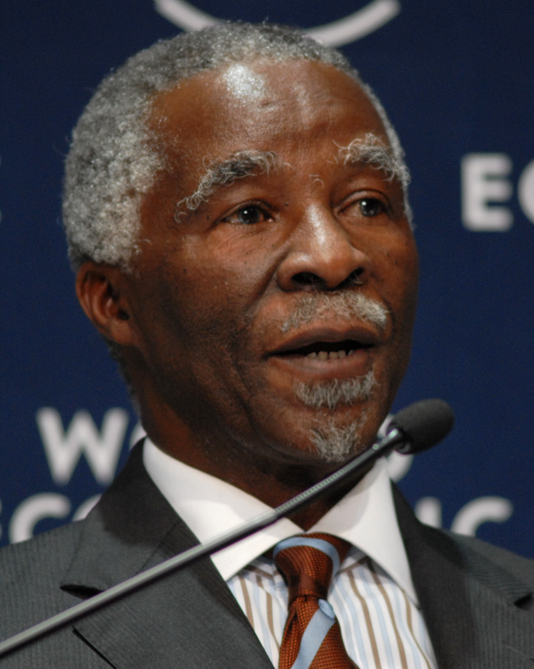
- Thabo Mbeki (2008)
- Date formed: 29 April 2004
- Date dissolved: 24 September 2008 (4 years, 4 months and 26 days)

People and organisations
- President: Thabo Mbeki
- Deputy President: Jacob Zuma (until 2005); Phumzile Mlambo-Ngcuka
- No. of ministers: 28 ministers
- Member parties: African National Congress; New National Party (until 2005); Azanian People's Organisation
- Status in legislature: Majority
- Opposition parties: Democratic Alliance
- Opposition leaders: Tony Leon (until 2007); Sandra Botha (from 2007)

History
- Election: 2004 election
- Legislature term: Third Parliament
- Predecessor: Mbeki I
- Successor: Motlanthe

The second cabinet of Thabo Mbeki was the cabinet of the government of South Africa from 29 April 2004 until 24 September 2008. It was in office for the duration of Mbeki's second term in the South African Presidency, which lasted between the 2004 general election and Mbeki's resignation from office on 24 September 2008.

The cabinet comprised 28 ministers and was reshuffled twice, once in June 2005 and once in May 2006. In addition to members of Mbeki's African National Congress, it included one minister apiece from the New National Party and Azanian People's Organisation.

== Cabinet ==
After the April 2004 general election, Thabo Mbeki was elected to his second and final term as President of South Africa. On 28 April 2004, he announced his new cabinet. Although his political party, the African National Congress (ANC), had won a supermajority in the election, he invited two opposition parties – the New National Party (NNP) and the Azanian People's Organisation (AZAPO) – to fill a cabinet post apiece. The Inkatha Freedom Party was not represented.

About half of the appointments were unchanged from Mbeki's outgoing first-term cabinet, and only six new ministers were appointed. The only major organisational change was Mbeki's decision to sever the Ministry of Arts and Culture from the Ministry of Science and Technology; until then they had been unified as the Ministry of Arts, Culture, Science and Technology. The 28-member cabinet included 12 women, an increase from Mbeki's first term.

== Reshuffles ==
The most dramatic change in the cabinet's composition occurred on 14 June 2005, when Mbeki announced his decision to remove Jacob Zuma from the Deputy Presidency. The sacking was the result of developments in ongoing corruption allegations against Zuma. Mbeki appointed Phumzile Mlambo-Ngcuka to succeed Zuma as the Deputy President, and in turn appointed Lindiwe Hendricks to succeed Mlambo-Ngcuka as Minister of Minerals and Energy.

The Minister of Public Works, Stella Sigcau, died less than a year later. In the aftermath of her death, on 22 May 2006, Mbeki announced his most extensive cabinet reshuffle, which resulted in the appointment to cabinet of Lulu Xingwana; it also affected three other ministers.

== List of ministers ==
Post	Minister	Term		Party
President of South Africa	His Excellency Thabo Mbeki	2004	2008	ANC
Deputy President of South Africa	Her Excellency Phumzile Mlambo-Ngcuka	2005	2008	ANC
Deputy President of South Africa	His Excellency Jacob Zuma	2004	2005	ANC
Minister in the Presidency	The Hon. Essop Pahad	2004	2008	ANC
Minister of Agriculture and Land Affairs	The Hon. Lulu Xingwana	2006	2008	ANC
Minister of Agriculture and Land Affairs	The Hon. Thoko Didiza	2004	2006	ANC
Minister of Arts and Culture	The Hon. Pallo Jordan	2004	2008	ANC
Minister of Communications	The Hon. Ivy Matsepe-Casaburri	2004	2008	ANC
Minister of Correctional Services	The Hon. Ngconde Balfour	2004	2008	ANC
Minister of Defence	The Hon. Mosiuoa Lekota	2004	2008	ANC
Minister of Education	The Hon. Naledi Pandor	2004	2008	ANC
Minister of Environmental Affairs and Tourism	The Hon. Marthinus van Schalkwyk	2004	2008	NNP
Minister of Finance	The Hon. Trevor Manuel	2004	2008	ANC
Minister of Foreign Affairs	The Hon. Nkosazana Dlamini-Zuma	2004	2008	ANC
Minister of Health	The Hon. Manto Tshabalala-Msimang	2004	2008	ANC
Minister of Home Affairs	The Hon. Nosiviwe Mapisa-Nqakula	2004	2008	ANC
Minister of Housing	The Hon. Lindiwe Sisulu	2004	2008	ANC
Minister of Intelligence	The Hon. Ronnie Kasrils	2004	2008	ANC
Minister of Justice and Constitutional Development	The Hon. Brigitte Mabandla	2004	2008	ANC
Minister of Labour	The Hon. Shepherd Mdladlana	2004	2008	ANC
Minister of Minerals and Energy	The Hon. Buyi Sonjica	2006	2008	ANC
Minister of Minerals and Energy	The Hon. Lindiwe Hendricks	2005	2006	ANC
Minister of Minerals and Energy	The Hon. Phumzile Mlambo-Ngcuka	2004	2005	ANC
Minister of Provincial and Local Government	The Hon. Sydney Mufamadi	2004	2008	ANC
Minister of Public Enterprises	The Hon. Alec Erwin	2004	2008	ANC
Minister of Public Service and Administration	The Hon. Geraldine Fraser-Moleketi	2004	2008	ANC
Minister of Public Works	The Hon. Thoko Didiza	2006	2008	ANC
Minister of Public Works	The Hon. Stella Sigcau	2004	2006	ANC
Minister of Safety and Security	The Hon. Charles Nqakula	2004	2008	ANC
Minister of Science and Technology	The Hon. Mosibudi Mangena	2004	2008	AZAPO
Minister of Social Development	The Hon. Zola Skweyiya	2004	2008	ANC
Minister of Sport and Recreation	The Hon. Arnold Stofile	2004	2008	ANC
Minister of Trade and Industry	The Hon. Mandisi Mpahlwa	2004	2008	ANC
Minister of Transport	The Hon. Jeff Radebe	2004	2008	ANC
Minister of Water Affairs and Forestry	The Hon. Lindiwe Hendricks	2006	2008	ANC
Minister of Water Affairs and Forestry	The Hon. Buyi Sonjica	2004	2006	ANC

== List of deputy ministers ==
Although deputy ministers are not members of the South African Cabinet, they are appointed by the president and assist cabinet ministers in the execution of their duties. At the same time as he announced his cabinet on 28 April 2004, Mbeki appointed 21 deputy ministers to serve below the cabinet. For the first time, he appointed two Deputy Ministers of Foreign Affairs to serve together. Two of the deputy ministers, Gert Oosthuizen of the ANC and Ntopile Kganyago of the opposition United Democratic Movement, were not sworn in until 10 May 2004.

In his minor reshuffle of June 2005, Mbeki appointed two Deputy Ministers of Trade and Industry, Rob Davies and Elizabeth Thabethe; until then there had been only one deputy minister, Lindiwe Hendricks, who was promoted to cabinet in the reshuffle.After this, Mbeki made two further changes to his corps of deputy ministers. First, on 25 January 2006, he announced that Cheryl Gillwald would resign as Deputy Minister of Correctional Services at the end of the month; he appointed Loretta Jacobus to replace her. Second, in a decision that sparked international controversy, he fired Nozizwe Madlala-Routledge as Deputy Minister of Health on 8 August 2007.

Mbeki did not appoint deputy ministers in the Ministries of Housing, Intelligence, Labour, Public Service and Administration, Public Enterprises, Transport, or Water Affairs and Forestry, nor did he appoint a deputy minister in the Presidency. In addition, when Lulu Xingwana was promoted to the cabinet in his May 2006 reshuffle, he did not appoint anybody to replace her as Deputy Minister of Minerals and Energy. Likewise, after Madlala-Routledge was dismissed, the position of Deputy Minister of Health remained vacant until the end of the cabinet's term.

Post	Minister	Term		Party
Deputy Minister of Agriculture and Land Affairs	The Hon. Dirk du Toit	2004	2008	ANC
Deputy Minister of Arts and Culture	The Hon. Ntombazana Botha	2004	2008	ANC
Deputy Minister of Communications	The Hon. Roy Padayachie	2004	2008	ANC
Deputy Minister of Correctional Services	The Hon. Loretta Jacobus	2006	2008	ANC
Deputy Minister of Correctional Services	The Hon. Cheryl Gillwald	2004	2006	ANC
Deputy Minister of Defence	The Hon. Mluleki George	2004	2008	ANC
Deputy Minister of Education	The Hon. Enver Surty	2004	2008	ANC
Deputy Minister of Environmental Affairs and Tourism	The Hon. Joyce Mabudafhasi	2004	2008	ANC
Deputy Minister of Finance	The Hon. Jabu Moleketi	2004	2008	ANC
Deputy Minister of Foreign Affairs 1st	The Hon. Aziz Pahad	2004	2008	ANC
Deputy Minister of Foreign Affairs 2nd	The Hon. Sue van der Merwe	2004	2008	ANC
Deputy Minister of Health	Office vacant			
Deputy Minister of Health	The Hon. Nozizwe Madlala-Routledge	2004	2007	ANC
Deputy Minister of Home Affairs	The Hon. Malusi Gigaba	2004	2008	ANC
Deputy Minister of Justice and Constitutional Development	The Hon. Johnny de Lange	2004	2008	ANC
Deputy Minister of Minerals and Energy	Office vacant			
Deputy Minister of Minerals and Energy	The Hon. Lulu Xingwana	2004	2006	ANC
Deputy Minister of Provincial and Local Government	The Hon. Nomatyala Hangana	2004	2008	ANC
Deputy Minister of Public Works	The Hon. Ntopile Kganyago	2004	2008	UDM
Deputy Minister of Safety and Security	The Hon. Susan Shabangu	2004	2008	ANC
Deputy Minister of Science and Technology	The Hon. Derek Hanekom	2004	2008	ANC
Deputy Minister of Social Development	The Hon. Jean Benjamin	2004	2008	ANC
Deputy Minister of Sport and Recreation	The Hon. Gert Oosthuizen	2004	2008	ANC
Deputy Minister of Trade and Industry 1st	The Hon. Rob Davies	2005	2008	ANC
Deputy Minister of Trade and Industry 1st	The Hon. Lindiwe Hendricks	2004	2005	ANC
Deputy Minister of Trade and Industry 2nd	The Hon. Elizabeth Thabethe	2005	2008	ANC
