= Elizabeth Thabethe =

South African politician and trade unionist (1959–2021)

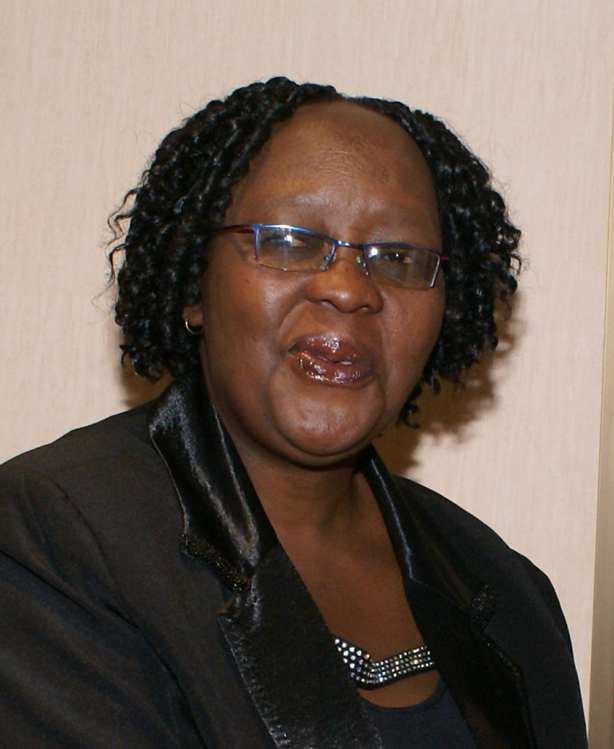
- Thabethe in 2011

Deputy Minister of Tourism
- In office 31 March 2017 – 7 May 2019
- President: Jacob Zuma; Cyril Ramaphosa
- Minister: Tokozile Xasa; Derek Hanekom
- Preceded by: Mandisi Mpahlwa
- Succeeded by: Fish Mahlalela
Other portfolios 2005–2017
Deputy Minister of Small Business Development
In office 26 May 2014 – 30 March 2017
President	Jacob Zuma
Minister	Lindiwe Zulu
Preceded by	Portfolio established
Succeeded by	Nomathemba November
Deputy Minister of Trade and Industry
In office 1 November 2010 – 25 May 2014 Serving with Thandi Tobias
President	Jacob Zuma
Minister	Rob Davies
Preceded by	Maria Ntuli
Succeeded by	Mzwandile Masina
In office 22 June 2005 – 10 May 2009 Serving with Rob Davies
President	Thabo Mbeki; Kgalema Motlanthe
Minister	Mandisi Mpahlwa
Preceded by	Lindiwe Hendricks
Succeeded by	Maria Ntuli

Member of the National Assembly
- In office 9 May 1994 – 7 May 2019
- Constituency: Gauteng (2004–2019)

Personal details
- Born: 26 September 1959
- Died: 26 March 2021 (aged 61)
- Resting place: Heroes' Acre, Pretoria

Elizabeth Thabethe (26 September 1959 – 26 March 2021) was a South African politician and former trade unionist from Gauteng. She represented the African National Congress (ANC) in the National Assembly of South Africa for five terms from May 1994 to May 2019. Between 2005 and 2019, she served as a deputy minister in the national governments of four successive presidents. After leaving the National Assembly, she was special investment envoy to President Cyril Ramaphosa until her death in March 2021.

Thabethe rose to prominence in the leadership of the Chemical Workers' Industrial Union, and she was elected to Parliament in the 1994 general election as a delegate of the Congress of South African Trade Unions. In the National Assembly, she served as an ANC whip from 1996 to 2004 and then as the chairperson of the Portfolio Committee on Environmental Affairs from 2004 to 2005.

Between 2005 and 2019, Thabethe was a deputy minister under four consecutive presidents. President Thabo Mbeki appointed her to the government as Deputy Minister of Trade and Industry in June 2005, and she held that position until May 2009 under Mbeki and his successor, President Kgalema Motlanthe. After a hiatus as chairperson of the Portfolio Committee on Energy, she returned as President Jacob Zuma's Deputy Minister of Trade and Industry from November 2010 to May 2014.

Thereafter she was the first Deputy Minister of Small Business Development from May 2014 to March 2017 under President Zuma, and the Deputy Minister of Tourism from March 2017 to May 2019 under Presidents Zuma and Ramaphosa. She retired from the National Assembly in the May 2019 general election.

== Early life and education ==
Thabethe was born on 26 September 1959. After the end of apartheid, she took postgraduate education in economics at the University of South Africa, where she completed a certificate and an advanced diploma in 2008.

== Trade union activism ==
Thabethe rose to prominence during apartheid as a trade unionist in the Chemical Workers' Industrial Union (CWIU) in present-day Gauteng. She joined the union in 1983 at her workplace and rose through its ranks from shop steward to national executive member. A protegé of Bertha Gxowa, she was influential as one of the few women in the trade union movement at the time.

CWIU was a founding affiliate of the Congress of South African Trade Unions (COSATU), the Tripartite Alliance partner of the African National Congress (ANC). Ahead of South Africa's first democratic elections in April 1994, Thabethe stood as a candidate for the ANC; with Joyce Mabudafhasi and Susan Shabangu, she was one of three women whom COSATU nominated for inclusion on the ANC list.

== Legislator: 1994–2005 ==
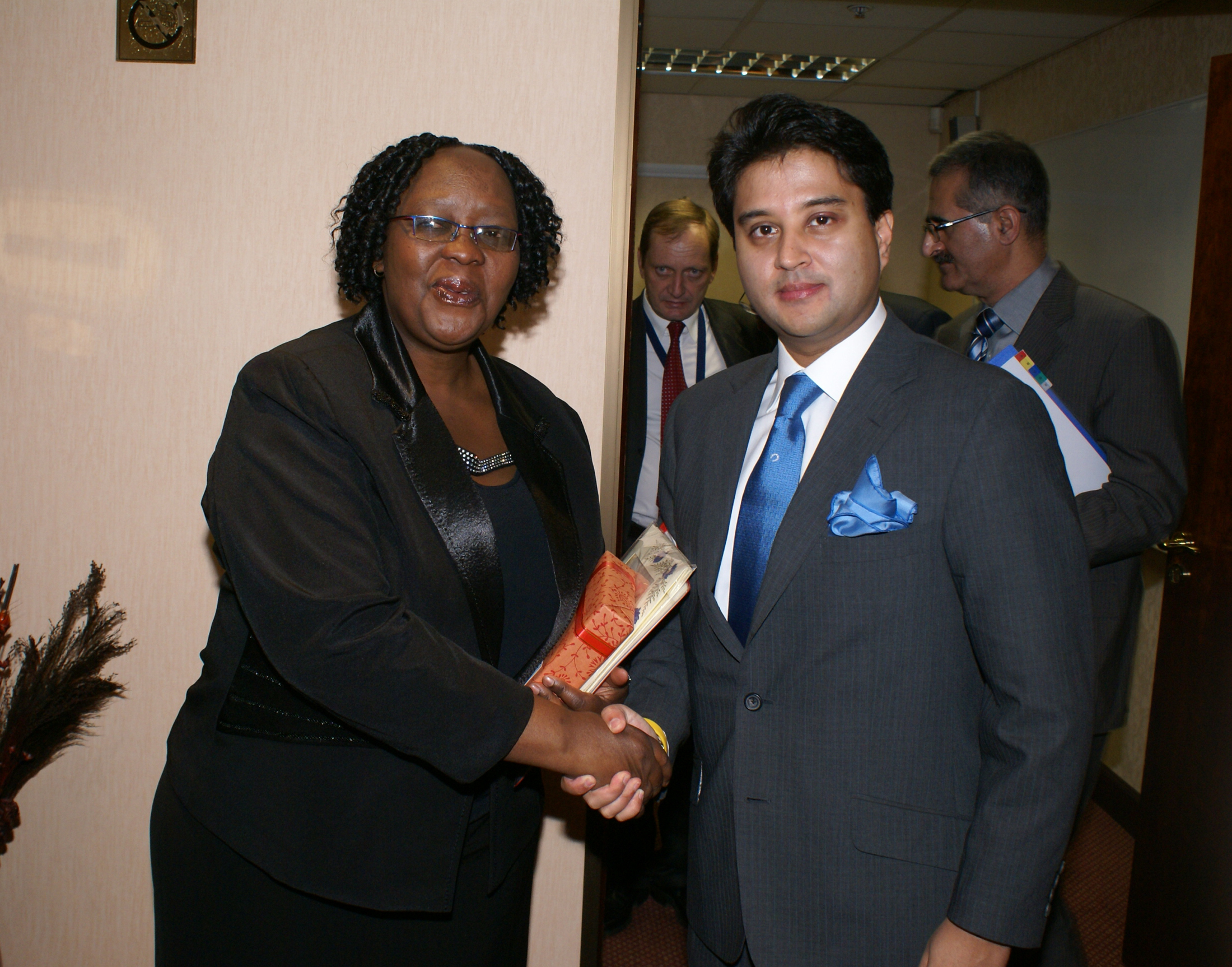
Thabete with Indian Minister Jyotiraditya Scindia in Pretoria, 21 September 2011

In the April 1994 election, Thabethe was elected to represent the ANC in the National Assembly, the lower house of the new South African Parliament. She served continuously in the National Assembly for the next 25 years, gaining re-election to five consecutive terms; for the last three terms, from April 2004 onwards, she represented the Gauteng constituency.

During her first decade in Parliament, as an ordinary Member of Parliament, Thabethe served in several different portfolio committees and was a member of both the ANC Women's Parliamentary Caucus and of the Multi-Party Women's Caucus. She also represented Parliament at the Southern African Development Community, and from 1996 onwards she was an ANC whip.

After the April 2004 general election, at the outset of the Third Parliament, the ANC selected Thabethe for election as chairperson of the Portfolio Committee on Environmental Affairs. In that position she succeeded Gwen Mahlangu-Nkabinde, who had been elected as Deputy Speaker. During this period she also served a term as deputy chairperson of the Gauteng branch of the ANC Women's League, and she was also a member of the regional executive committee of the mainstream ANC's Ekhuruleni branch.

== Deputy minister: 2005–2019 ==
Thabethe served as committee chairperson for just over a year: on 22 June 2005, reshuffling his second-term cabinet, President Thabo Mbeki announced her appointment as Deputy Minister of Trade and Industry. At the same time, he announced that he would appoint a second Deputy Minister in the portfolio, Rob Davies. Together they deputised Minister Mandisi Mpahlwa. They were sworn in to office on 23 June. Both Thabethe and Davies, along with Minister Mpahlwa, were retained in the ministry when Mbeki was succeeded by President Kgalema Motlanthe in a midterm presidential election in 2008.

After the April 2009 general election, Thabethe was re-elected to her parliamentary seat, but newly elected President Jacob Zuma declined to reappoint her as deputy minister. Instead, in May, the ANC appointed her as chairperson of the Portfolio Committee on Energy. She held that position for 18 months, until Zuma's first cabinet reshuffle on 31 October 2010. In that reshuffle, Zuma restored Thabethe to her former position of Deputy Minister of Trade and Industry; succeeding Maria Ntuli, she served alongside Thandi Tobias as deputy to Davies, who had been promoted to Minister.

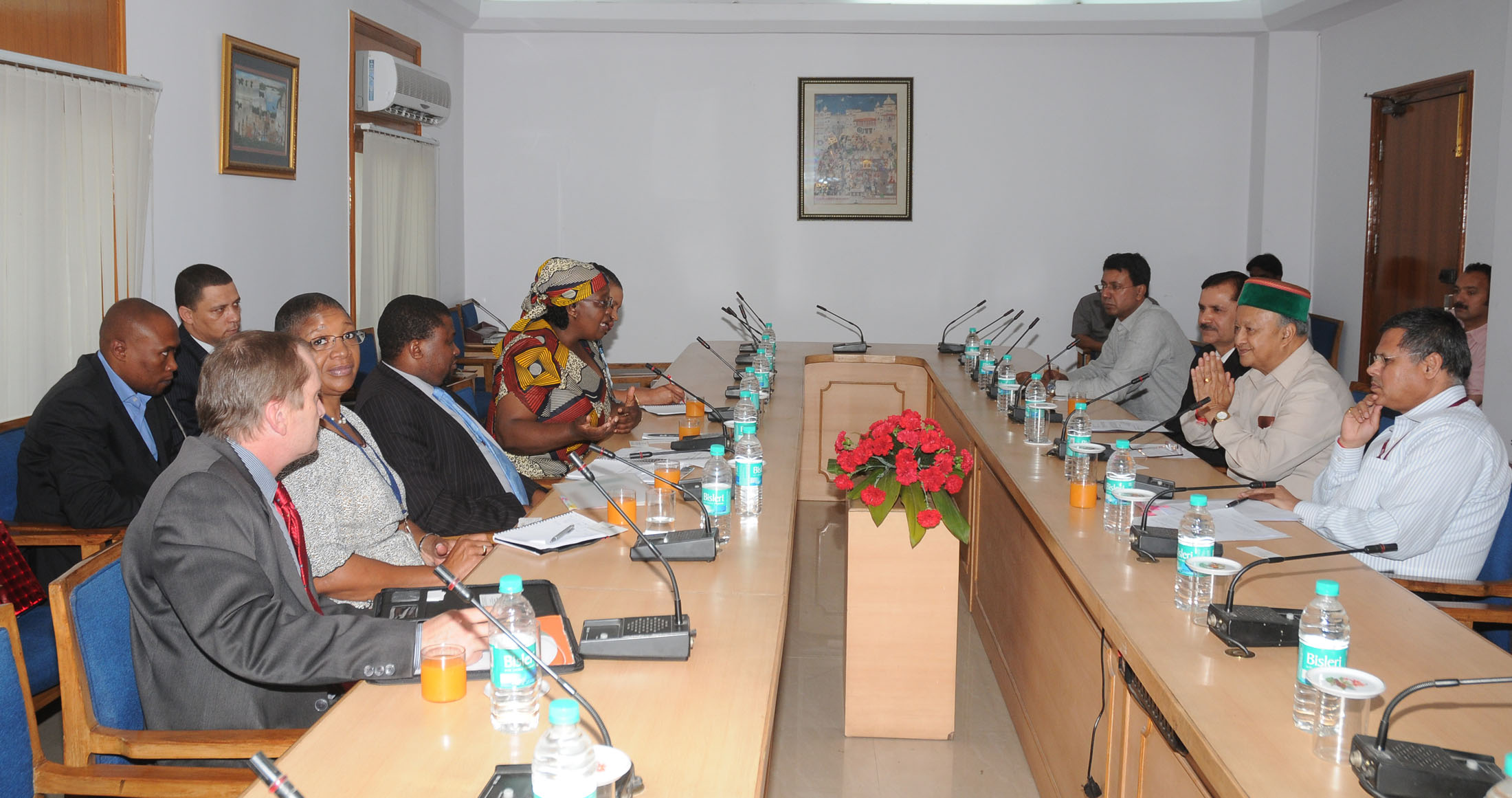
Thabethe (left centre) meeting with the Indian Minister of Micro, Small and Medium Enterprises, Virbhadra Singh, in New Delhi, 28 March 2011

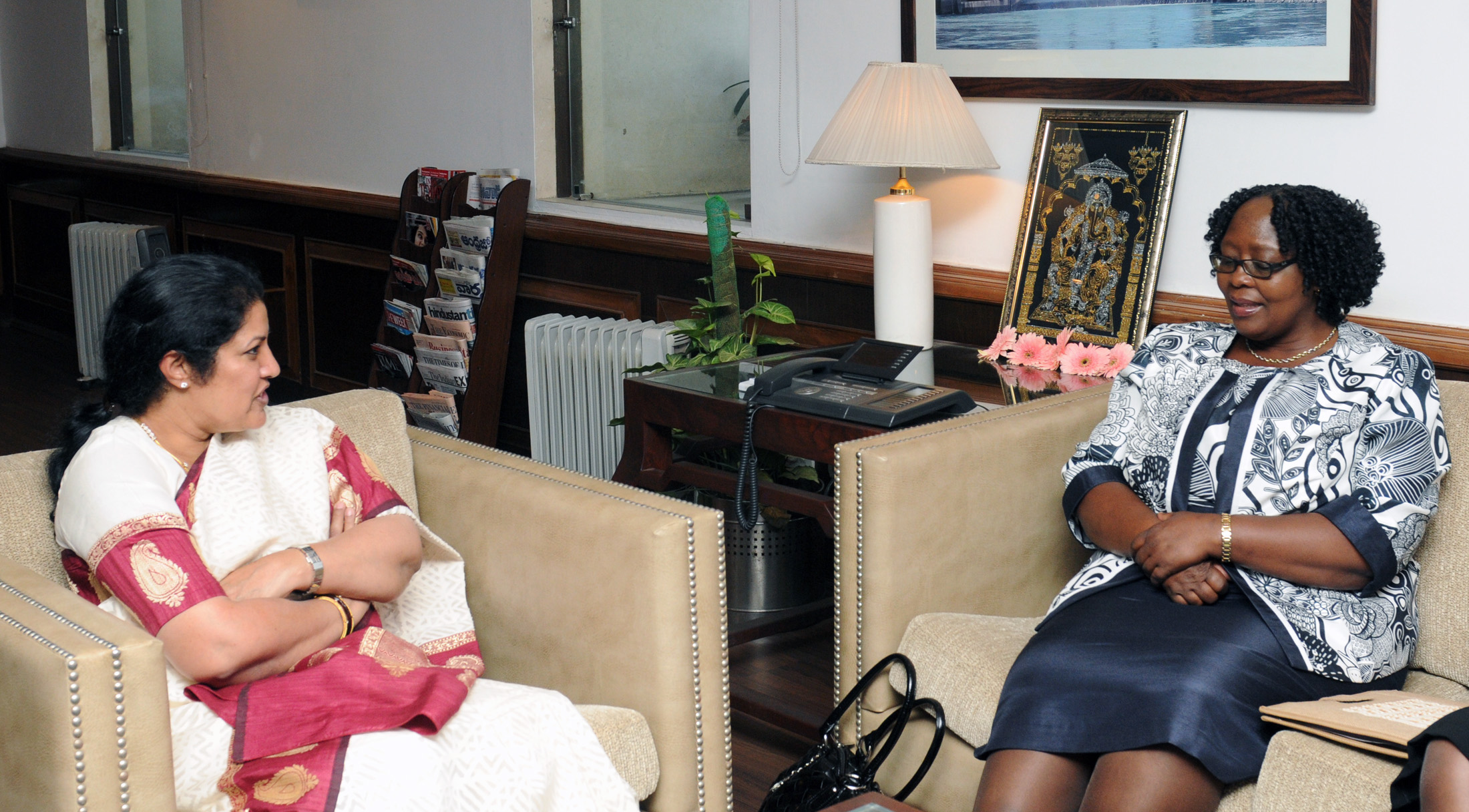
Thabethe with Indian Minister of Commerce D. Purandeswari in New Delhi, 4 March 2013

She continued in the deputy ministry until the May 2014 general election, in which she was elected to her fifth and final term in the National Assembly. Announcing his second-term cabinet on 25 May 2014, Zuma appointed Thabethe as Deputy Minister of Small Business Development – a newly established portfolio, led by Minister Lindiwe Zulu.

In the early hours of 31 March 2017, Zuma announced a major cabinet reshuffle in which Thabethe was moved to the post of Deputy Minister of Tourism, serving under Minister Tokozile Xasa. She served in that position for the rest of the Fifth Parliament, gaining reappointment under President Cyril Ramaphosa; after he took office in February 2018, Ramaphosa replaced Xasa with Minister Derek Hanekom. In mid-2018, the Parliamentary Monitoring Group reported that Thabethe was one of five incumbent ministers and deputy ministers who had not attended a single parliamentary committee meeting that year.

== Presidential envoy: 2019–2021 ==
Thabethe did not stand for re-election to Parliament in the May 2019 general election. Instead, on 4 November 2019, President Ramaphosa named Thabethe as one of three special investment envoys tasked with supporting his drive to attract $100 billion in new foreign direct investment; the other envoys were Jeff Radebe, focusing on the oil and gas industry, and Derek Hanekom, Thabethe's former boss, who with Thabethe was to focus on investment in the tourism sector. She also served on Ramaphosa's Presidential Advisory Committee on Investment.

== Personal life and death ==
Thabethe was seriously injured in a car accident in Katlehong, Gauteng on 29 January 2021. After waking from a coma, she was in rehabilitation for her injuries in March when her health worsened; she died in hospital on 26 March.

She was buried at Heroes' Acre on 3 April after a funeral at Change Bible Church in Katlehong, where the speakers included Panyaza Lesufi and Faith Mazibuko. In a statement, President Ramaphosa called her "a champion of economic transformation and equity", and the ANC called her a "distinguished daughter of the soil".

Thabethe had one daughter.
