= Rejoice Mabudafhasi =

South African politician

Deputy Minister for Arts and Culture
- In office 26 May 2014 – 30 May 2017
- President: Jacob Zuma
- Minister: Nathi Mthethwa
- Succeeded by: Maggie Sotyu

Deputy Minister for Water and Environmental Affairs
- In office 11 May 2009 – 25 May 2014
- President: Jacob Zuma
- Minister: Buyelwa Sonjica; Edna Molewa

Minister for Environmental Affairs and Tourism
- In office 17 June 1999 – 10 May 2009
- President: Thabo Mbeki
- Minister: Valli Moosa; Marthinus van Schalkwyk

Personal details
- Born: 23 May 1943 (age 82)
- Citizenship: South Africa
- Party: African National Congress

Rejoice Thizwilondi Mabudafhasi (born 23 May 1943) is a South African politician who represented the African National Congress (ANC) in the National Assembly from 1994 until her resignation in April 2017. She was appointed as South Africa's Ambassador to Zimbabwe in 2021.

Mabudafhasi previously served as Deputy Minister for Environmental Affairs and Tourism from 1999 to 2009 under President Thabo Mbeki and then, under President Jacob Zuma, as Deputy Minister for Water and Environmental Affairs from 2009 to 2014 and as Deputy Minister for Arts and Culture from 2014 to 2017. She resigned from Parliament after Zuma fired her from the latter position in 2017. A former trade unionist and anti-apartheid activist, she also served on the ANC's National Executive Committee between 2007 and 2022.

== Early life and career ==
Mabudafhasi was born on 23 May 1943. She served a brief stint as a teacher at Tshilidzi School in Soweto from 1962 to 1963 before becoming a librarian at the University of the North in 1965. While working at the university, she was active in the anti-apartheid movement, including through the United Democratic Front and Federation of Transvaal Women. From 1992 to 1994, she also served as national treasurer of the National Education, Health and Allied Workers Union, an affiliate of the ANC-allied Congress of South African Trade Unions (COSATU).

== Career in government ==
Mabudafhasi left the University of North after the 1994 general election, in which she was elected to an ANC seat in the first post-apartheid Parliament. With Susan Shabangu and Elizabeth Thabethe, she was one of three women who represented COSATU on the ANC's list of candidates.

=== Environmental Affairs and Tourism: 1999–2009 ===
After her re-election to Parliament in the 1999 general election, President Thabo Mbeki appointed Mabudafhasi as Deputy Minister for Environmental Affairs and Tourism. She retained that office from June 1999 until May 2009, throughout Mbeki's tenure and the brief term of his successor, Kgalema Motlanthe; she served under Ministers Valli Moosa and Marthinus van Schalkwyk. In addition, at the ANC's 52nd National Conference in December 2007, she was elected to her first five-year term on the party's National Executive Committee; by popularity, she was ranked 42nd of the 80 candidates elected, receiving 1,698 votes across the roughly 4,000 ballots cast.

=== Water and Environmental Affairs: 2009–2014 ===
After the 2009 general election, newly elected President Jacob Zuma reconfigured the executive and Mabudafhasi was appointed Deputy Minister for Water and Environmental Affairs under Minister Buyelwa Sonjica (later replaced by Edna Molewa). Midway through the legislative term, at the ANC's 53rd National Conference in December 2012, she was re-elected to the ANC National Executive Committee, ranked 27th of the 80 members by popularity.

=== Arts and Culture: 2014–2017 ===
In the 2014 general election, Mabudafhasi was re-elected to her final term in Parliament, ranked 44th on the ANC's national party list. After the election, Zuma moved her from the Water and Environmental Affairs portfolio, appointing her Deputy Minister for Arts and Culture under Minister Nathi Mthethwa. However, less than three years later, Zuma fired her in a cabinet reshuffle announced in late March 2017. Shortly afterwards, she announced that she would also resign as an ordinary Member of Parliament, effective from 30 April 2017.

== Late career ==
Despite her resignation from Parliament, Mabudafhasi was re-elected to another five-year term on the ANC National Executive Committee at the party's next elective conference in December 2017. In 2021, she was appointed South African Ambassador to Zimbabwe by Zuma's successor, President Cyril Ramaphosa. She did not stand for re-election to the ANC National Executive at the 55th National Conference in December 2022.
