= Tokozile Xasa =

South African politician (born 1965)

Her Excellency Tokozile Xasa
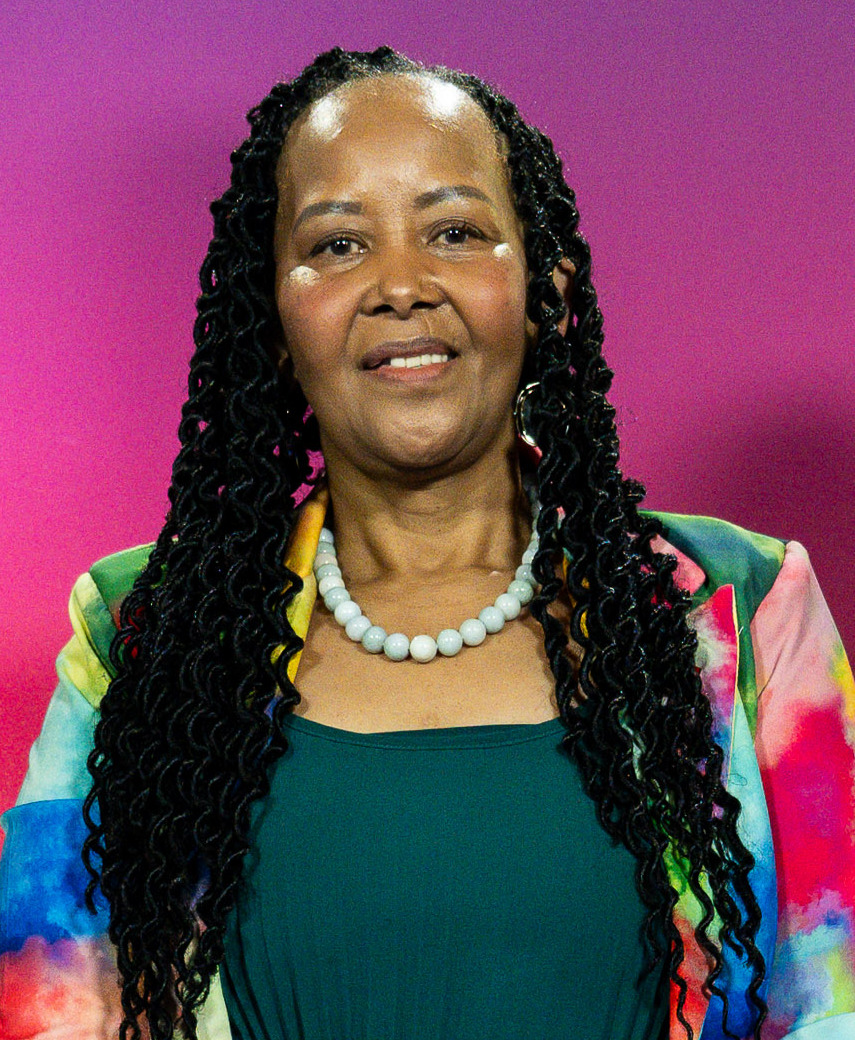
- Tokozile Xasa in March 2024

Minister of Sport and Recreation
- In office 27 February 2018 – 25 May 2019
- President: Cyril Ramaphosa
- Deputy: Gert Oosthuizen
- Preceded by: Thulas Nxesi
- Succeeded by: Nathi Mthethwa (for Sports, Arts and Culture)

Minister of Tourism
- In office 31 March 2017 – 26 February 2018
- President: Jacob Zuma; Cyril Ramaphosa
- Deputy: Elizabeth Thabethe
- Preceded by: Derek Hanekom
- Succeeded by: Derek Hanekom

Deputy Minister of Tourism
- In office 11 May 2009 – 30 March 2017
- President: Jacob Zuma
- Minister: Marthinus van Schalkwyk; Derek Hanekom
- Preceded by: Portfolio established
- Succeeded by: Elizabeth Thabethe

Member of the National Assembly
- In office 6 May 2009 – 5 June 2019

Personal details
- Born: 28 April 1965 (age 61)
- Citizenship: South Africa
- Party: African National Congress
- Education: University of Transkei; University of Fort Hare

Tokozile Xasa (born 28 April 1965) is a South African politician who was the Minister of Sport and Recreation from February 2018 to May 2019. Before that, she was the Minister of Tourism from March 2017 to February 2018. A member of the National Assembly between 2009 and 2019, she took office as South African Ambassador to Belgium in February 2021.

A teacher by profession, Xasa was a member of the Eastern Cape Provincial Legislature between 2001 and 2009; during that period, she also held three different portfolios in the Executive Council of the Eastern Cape. She joined the National Assembly and national government after the April 2009 general election, named by President Jacob Zuma to a newly created ministry as Deputy Minister of Tourism. She served in that position until March 2017, when she was promoted to become minister in the same portfolio. Zuma's successor, President Cyril Ramaphosa, initially retained Xasa in his cabinet as Minister of Sport and Recreation from February 2018. However, she was excluded from Ramaphosa's second cabinet and resigned from the National Assembly shortly after the May 2019 general election.

Xasa is a member of the African National Congress (ANC) and served on the ANC National Executive Committee from December 2017 to December 2022. She is also a former spokesperson of the ANC Women's League.

== Early life and education ==
Xasa was born on 28 April 1965. She is from the Eastern Cape. She holds a BA from the University of Transkei and two postgraduate degrees, an Honours and a master's in public administration, from the University of Fort Hare.

== Early career ==
She trained as a teacher and taught at several different high schools; at the same time, she joined the ANC Women's League in 1993.

Between 1997 and 2000, during the post-apartheid transition in local government, she was the mayor of the Kei District (later renamed the Amathole District) in the Eastern Cape. She was the first woman to serve as mayor of a district municipality in the Eastern Cape.

== Provincial government: 2001–2009 ==
Xasa went on to represent the ANC in the Eastern Cape Provincial Legislature between 2001 and 2009. During that time, she served in the Executive Council of the Eastern Cape in three different portfolios – as Member of the Executive Council (MEC) for Social Development; MEC for Housing, Local Government and Traditional Affairs; and MEC for Local Government and Traditional Affairs. She also served as acting MEC for Health after the incumbent, Bevan Goqwana, was sacked in April 2006.

Concurrently, between December 2006 and September 2009, she was the Provincial Treasurer of the Eastern Cape branch of the ANC, serving under Provincial Chairperson Stone Sizani; she served a single term before she was succeeded by Thandiswa Marawu in 2009.

== National government: 2009–2019 ==
=== Deputy Minister of Tourism ===
In the April 2009 general election, Xasa was elected to represent the ANC in the National Assembly, the lower house of the South African Parliament. After the election, President Jacob Zuma named her as his Deputy Minister of Tourism; she served under Minister Marthinus van Schalkwyk in what was a newly created portfolio. She was retained in the position after the May 2014 general election, now under Minister Derek Hanekom. Indeed, she ultimately served nearly eight years in the position, and throughout that time maintained a "low profile", though she served concurrently as the national spokesperson of the ANC Women's League.

=== Minister of Tourism ===
On the night of 30 March 2017, Zuma announced a controversial cabinet reshuffle, in which Xasa was appointed to replace Hanekom as Minister of Tourism. Elizabeth Thabethe was named as her deputy. She was the first woman to lead the ministry. During her year in the position, the ministry completed a revised ten-year national tourism sector strategy, approved by cabinet, and the Department of Tourism received a clean audit; however, the Mail & Guardian nonetheless said that, given her long experience in the portfolio, her performance had been "a disappointment so far", particularly insofar as she had not driven growth in tourism demand.

Xasa continued to be viewed as a "low key" politician. However, in June 2017, she caused a minor stir when she revealed in an answer to a parliamentary question that SA Tourism, an agency under her oversight, had a multi-million-rand contract with Bell Pottinger, the public relations firm that had recently been linked to disinformation campaigns by the Gupta family and Duduzane Zuma. SA Tourism's United Kingdom office had paid the firm R9.6 million for public relations and communications services over three years. The contract had been awarded prior to Xasa's promotion and prior to Bell Pottinger's engagements with the Guptas and Duduzane Zuma, but the opposition Democratic Alliance nonetheless said that it would seek to have Xasa justify the expenditure before the Portfolio Committee on Tourism.

In September 2017, Xasa was elected to a two-year term as one of two deputy chairpersons of the United Nations World Tourism Organization's Regional Commission for Africa. She served under chairperson Najib Balala of Kenya and alongside Hamat Bah of Gambia. Three months later, she attended the ANC's 54th National Conference at Nasrec, where she was elected to a five-year term as a member of the party's National Executive Committee. By number of votes received, she was ranked 70th of the 80 members elected to the committee.

=== Minister of Sport and Recreation ===
On 26 February 2018, Cyril Ramaphosa, who had recently succeeded Zuma as president, announced a major cabinet reshuffle, in which Xasa was named to succeed Thulas Nxesi as Minister of Sport and Recreation. She was the first woman to hold the office. She said that her priorities would include school sport and community sport infrastructure, as well as racial transformation in sporting bodies to ensure equality of opportunity. She was a prominent figure in the South African defence of athlete Caster Semenya: when the International Association of Athletics Federations announced its 2018 testosterone policy change for women athletes, Xasa condemned the new policy as "very sexist, very racial and homophobic", and in February 2019 she accompanied Semenya to Lausanne, Switzerland to challenge the policy at the Court of Arbitration for Sport.

=== Resignation ===
In the next general election in May 2019, Xasa was comfortably re-elected to the National Assembly, ranked 30th on the ANC's national party list. However, Ramaphosa sacked her from his second cabinet, appointing Nathi Mthethwa to replace her in a newly enlarged portfolio as Minister of Sports, Arts and Culture. Shortly after Ramaphosa's cabinet announcement, the ANC announced that Xasa had resigned from her legislative seat.

Ramaphosa subsequently designated her as South African Ambassador to Belgium, with non-resident accreditation to Luxembourg and the European Union. She arrived in Brussels in December 2020 and presented her credentials on 2 February 2021. She was not re-elected to the ANC National Executive Committee when her term expired at the party's 55th National Conference in December 2022.
