= Mandisi Mpahlwa =

South African politician

His Excellency Mandisi Mpahlwa
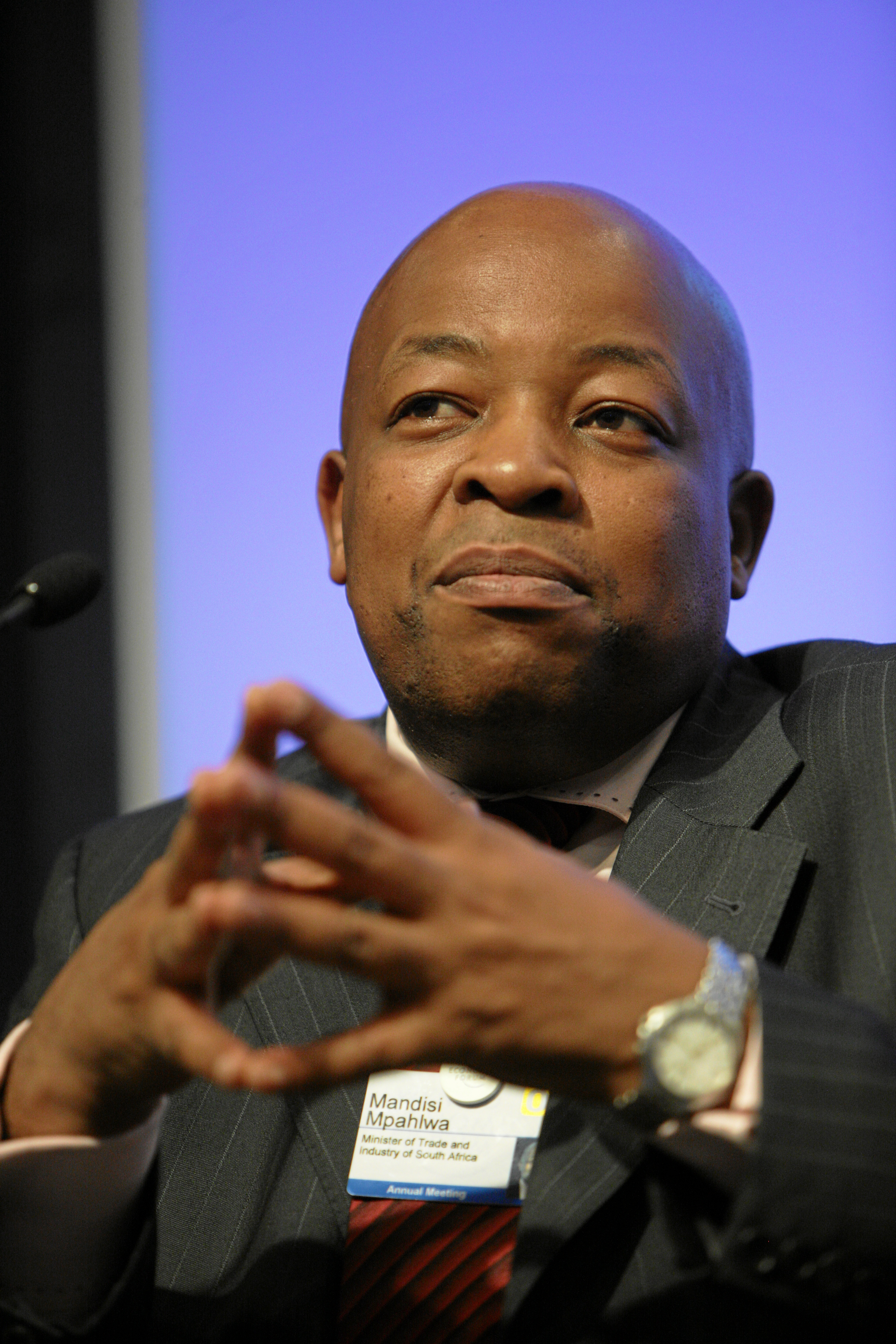
- Mpahlwa in 2009

Minister of Trade and Industry
- In office 29 April 2004 – 10 May 2009
- President: Thabo Mbeki; Kgalema Motlanthe
- Deputy: Lindiwe Hendricks; Rob Davies; Elizabeth Thabethe
- Preceded by: Alec Erwin
- Succeeded by: Rob Davies

Deputy Minister of Finance
- In office 17 June 1999 – 28 April 2004
- President: Thabo Mbeki
- Minister: Trevor Manuel
- Preceded by: Gill Marcus
- Succeeded by: Jabu Moleketi

Member of the National Assembly
- In office 27 April 1994 – 1 June 2009

Personal details
- Born: Mandisi Bongani Mabuto Mpahlwa; 21 August 1960 (age 66)
- Party: African National Congress
- Parent: Laura Mpahlwa
- Education: University of London

Mandisi Bongani Mabuto Mpahlwa (born 21 August 1960), formerly also known as Sipho Mpahlwa, is a South African politician and diplomat. A member of the African National Congress (ANC), he was the Minister of Trade and Industry from April 2004 to May 2009. He most recently served as South African High Commissioner to Rwanda.

Mpahlwa is from the Eastern Cape and trained as an electrical technician before he went into exile with the ANC in 1985. After the end of apartheid, he represented the ANC in the National Assembly for three consecutive terms between April 1994 and May 2009. He rose to prominence after he was elected as chairperson of Parliament's finance committee in 1997. He was also a member of the ANC's Provincial Executive Committee in the Eastern Cape.

During Thabo Mbeki's presidency, Mpahlwa was appointed as Deputy Minister of Finance in June 1999 and then as Minister of Trade and Industry in April 2004. He was sometimes touted as a future finance minister. However, President Jacob Zuma sacked him from the cabinet after the April 2009 general election. He served a brief stint as economic adviser to Zuma in the presidency from 2009 to 2010 before Zuma appointed him to his first diplomatic post in July 2010.

== Early life and career ==
Mpahlwa was born on 21 August 1960. His family in Mthatha in the former Cape Province (now the Eastern Cape) was active in the anti-apartheid struggle. Mpahlwa's mother, Laura Mpahlwa (1929–2019), was a nurse and well-known community activist in the Transkei; she received an official funeral after her death in 2019 and was posthumously awarded the Order of Luthuli.

Mpahlwa attended Bethel Seventh Day Adventist College outside of Butterworth and completed his secondary schooling in technical colleges in Mthatha and Umlazi between 1977 and 1979, obtaining national technical certificates in electrical engineering technology. In 1980, enrolled at the Mangosuthu Technikon in Durban to study heavy current electrical engineering; while there, he worked for Norton Abrasives in Isando. However, without completing his diploma, he returned to Mthatha in 1983 to work in the family business. After that he worked briefly as a trainee electrical engineering technician in the Umtata Municipality before he left South Africa to join the African National Congress (ANC) in exile in November 1985.

The ANC was unbanned during the negotiations to end apartheid, and, upon returning to South Africa, Mpahlwa was a member of the regional executive committee of the party's newly re-established branch in Transkei from 1991 to 1994. He was also involved in the ANC's delegation to the Convention for a Democratic South Africa and served as the ANC's regional elections coordinator in Transkei ahead of South Africa's first democratic elections in April 1994.

In 2001, while serving in government, Mpahlwa graduated from the University of London with a Master of Science in financial economics.

== National Assembly: 1994–2009 ==
In the April 1994 election, Mpahlwa was elected to an ANC seat in the National Assembly, the new lower house of the South African Parliament. He sat on the backbenches until 1997, when he was elected as chairperson of the legislature's finance committee. He was viewed as "highly competent" in the portfolio, and by the end of the parliamentary term he was considered a frontrunner for appointment as Deputy Minister of Finance.

Mpahlwa also remained active in the ANC; he was a member of the regional executive committee of the party's branch in Mthatha until 1998, when he ascended to the provincial executive committee of the Eastern Cape branch.

=== Deputy Minister of Finance: 1999–2004 ===
Re-elected to the National Assembly in the June 1999 general election, Mpahlwa was also promoted to the national executive when newly elected president Thabo Mbeki announced his new cabinet on 17 June 1999. As expected, Mbeki appointed him as Deputy Minister of Finance under Minister Trevor Manuel. In 2000, the Mail & Guardian named him as one of its "top 100 stars of the future", saying that he had "quietly proved himself a competent operator".

Mpahlwa remained a member of the Eastern Cape ANC's provincial executive committee until 2004. During that time, at the provincial party's elective conference in April 2003, he launched an unsuccessful bid to succeed Stone Sizani as ANC deputy provincial chairperson. Mpahlwa was presumed to be among Mbeki's favoured candidates for the provincial party's leadership team, and he was increasingly broached as a possible candidate for appointment as Premier of the Eastern Cape. However, in a crowded field of contestants for the deputy chairman position, he lost resoundingly, receiving 98 votes to Enoch Godongwana's 77 votes, Phumulo Masualle's 125, and Thobile Mhlahlo's 83.

=== Minister of Trade and Industry: 2004–2009 ===
Mpahlwa was re-elected to a third term in the National Assembly in the April 2004 general election, ranked 43rd on the ANC's national party list. After the election, President Mbeki named him as Minister of Trade and Industry in his second-term cabinet. The Mail & Guardian suggested that he had been appointed because of his "expert[ise] in enterprise finance", and he was regarded as being groomed for possible appointment as Finance Minister after Manuel's retirement.

Lindiwe Hendricks was initially appointed as his deputy minister, but in a June 2005 cabinet reshuffle, Mbeki augmented the ministry by creating two separate deputy ministerial positions in the portfolio, to be filled by Rob Davies and Elizabeth Thabethe. Observers viewed this reconfiguration as a sign that Mpahlwa's Department of Trade and Industry was being given increasing responsibility for economic development planning, with the National Treasury possibly restricted to a more circumscribed macroeconomic policy role.

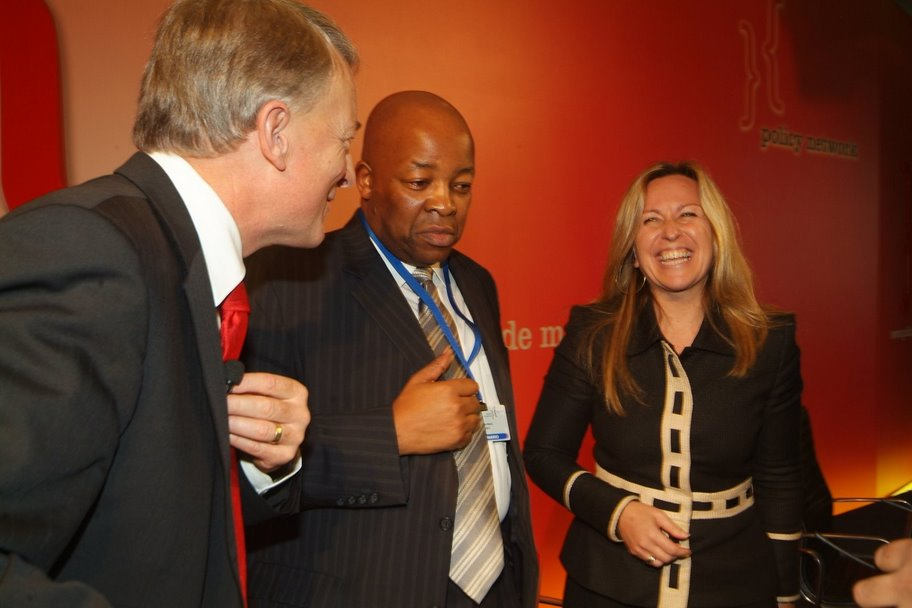
Mpahlwa (centre) with Phil Goff and Trinidad Jimenez at the Progressive Governance Conference in Chile in April 2009

==== Policies and initiatives ====
Mpahlwa launched much-anticipated revisions to the BEE Codes of Good Practice in 2005; they received a lukewarm reception. He also spent considerable energy on international trade issues, joining government delegations to Europe and the European Commission, Algeria, central Africa, the World Economic Forum, and the Persian Gulf.

In 2007, Mpahlwa was frequently in the news because of an ongoing crisis at the National Lottery. He had selected Gidani as the new operator of the lottery, awarding the national lottery license to the company in 2006, but that decision was subsequently challenged, in part because of Gidani's political exposure. In March 2007, the Pretoria High Court set aside the award, ruling that the decision-making process was flawed and that Mpahlwa and the lottery board had failed to take proper steps to investigate Gidani's shareholders. Because the government's contract with the outgoing lottery operator, Uthingo, was due to expire at the end of the month, Mpahlwa opted—hours before the deadline—to suspend the national lottery indefinitely. Several months of uncertainty, and further court action, followed, before the license was re-awarded to Gidani in September 2007. Uthingo's chairperson, Barney Pityana, was publicly critical of Mpahlwa's handling of the saga, as was the opposition Democratic Alliance (DA), which said that Mpahlwa had allowed "the credibility of our national lottery [to] be eroded".

Evaluating Mpahlwa's overall performance in late 2008, the Mail & Guardian said that he was "a nice guy, but a pretty terrible trade and industry minister". The editorial criticised his handling of industrial policy and said that his portfolio's competition policy successes, while admirable, had been achieved "despite tepid support from Mpahlwa". The DA also remained an outspoken critic of Mpahlwa's ministry; at one point the DA's economic spokesperson, Pierre Rabie, said that the party would have tabled a parliamentary motion of no confidence in Mpahlwa if the Constitution allowed for it.

==== Succession ====
Ahead of the ANC's 52nd National Conference in December 2007, Mpahlwa was nominated to stand for election to the ANC's National Executive Committee, but he was not elected.

However, Mpahlwa served in his ministerial portfolio throughout the Third Parliament, retaining the post when Kgalema Motlanthe replaced Mbeki in a midterm presidential election. Notwithstanding the political upheaval in the ANC, Mpahlwa was also nominated to stand for re-election to his parliamentary seat in the April 2009 general election. However, Jacob Zuma took office as president after the election, and he sacked Mpahlwa from his cabinet; Davies, his former deputy minister, was appointed to replace him as Minister of Trade and Industry.

Instead, in May 2009, the Presidency announced that Mpahlwa would resign from Parliament in order to serve as President Zuma's economic adviser. Mpahlwa resigned from his parliamentary seat on 1 June 2009 and was replaced by Mighty Madasa.

== Diplomatic career: 2010–present ==
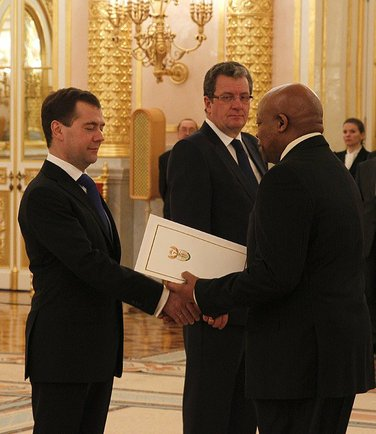
Mpahlwa with Russian president Dmitry Medvedev in February 2011

Mpahlwa's tenure as economic adviser was short-lived. The Mail & Guardian reported later in 2009 that Zuma was more likely to turn to his new Minister of Economic Development, Ebrahim Patel, for economic advice. Mpahlwa's appointment was regarded as a concession by Zuma to the more conservative, Mbeki-aligned factions of the ANC, and there were frequent reports that Mpahlwa was sidelined from economic decision-making. Indeed, diplomatic cables published by WikiLeaks later revealed that Mo Shaik, one of Zuma's confidantes, had told diplomats that Zuma had appointed Mpahlwa and certain of his other presidential advisers merely to "keep them quiet".

In July 2010, Zuma's office announced that Mpahlwa would leave the presidency and accept appointment as South African Ambassador to the Russian Federation in September that year. After his return from Moscow, Mpahlwa was appointed as High Commissioner to Mozambique and later as High Commissioner to Rwanda.

== Personal life ==
One of Mpahlwa's brothers is Luyanda Mpahlwa, a prominent architect. His sister is Mandlakazi Madaka, who married Umkhonto weSizwe operative and senior National Intelligence Agency member Mhleli "Paul" Madaka.
