= Maggie Sotyu =

South African politician

The Honourable Maggie Sotyu MP

Deputy Minister of Tourism
- Incumbent
- Assumed office 30 June 2024
- President: Cyril Ramaphosa
- Minister: Patricia de Lille

Deputy Minister of Environment, Forestry and Fisheries
- In office 30 May 2019 – 19 June 2024
- President: Cyril Ramaphosa
- Minister: Barbara Creecy
- Preceded by: Portfolio restructured

Deputy Minister of Arts and Culture
- In office 31 March 2017 – 25 May 2019
- President: Jacob Zuma; Cyril Ramaphosa
- Minister: Nathi Mthethwa
- Preceded by: Rejoice Mabudafhasi
- Succeeded by: Nocawe Mafu

Deputy Minister of Police
- In office 31 October 2010 – 30 March 2017
- President: Jacob Zuma
- Minister: Nathi Mthethwa; Nathi Nhleko
- Preceded by: Fikile Mbalula
- Succeeded by: Bongani Mkongi

Member of the National Assembly
- Incumbent
- Assumed office 14 June 1999
- Constituency: Free State (1999–2019)

Personal details
- Born: 28 May 1957 (age 68)
- Citizenship: South Africa
- Party: African National Congress
- Education: St Matthew's High School

Makhotso Magdeline "Maggie" Sotyu (born 28 May 1957) is a South African politician who is currently serving as Deputy Minister of Environment, Forestry and Fisheries since May 2019. She has been a deputy minister since 2010, formerly as Deputy Minister of Arts and Culture and Deputy Minister of Police, and has represented the African National Congress in the National Assembly since June 1999.

Sotyu was elected to the National Assembly in the 1999 general election, where she represented the Free State constituency until she was included on the national party list in 2019. Under the cabinet of President Jacob Zuma, she served as Deputy Minister of Police from November 2010 to March 2017 and then as Deputy Minister of Arts and Culture from March 2017 to May 2019. President Cyril Ramaphosa appointed her to her current position after the 2019 general election.

== Education and early career ==
Born on 28 May 1957, Sotyu matriculated at St Matthews High School in Keiskammahoek. She later earned tertiary certificates from the University of the Western Cape and University of Dar es Salaam.

She began her political career through the apartheid-era trade union movement while working in a factory in Bloemfontein. In the 1980s, living in Phelindaba, she was the regional secretary of the Bloemfontein branch of the South African National Civics Organisation. After the African National Congress (ANC) was unbanned in 1990, she joined the party, ultimately gaining election to the Provincial Executive Committees of the ANC and ANC Women's League in the Free State.

== National Assembly: 1999–2010 ==
In the 1999 general election, Sotyu was elected to the National Assembly, the lower house of the South African Parliament. She represented the ANC in the Free State constituency. Over the next two decades, she was elected to four further consecutive terms in the assembly; she continued to represent the Free State until 2019, when she was listed on the ANC's national party list, ranked 81st.

After the 2004 general election, the ANC announced that it would nominate Sotyu to succeed Mluleki George as the chairperson of the Portfolio Committee on Safety and Security. In that capacity, in 2008, Sotyu played a central role in Parliament's processing of the ANC's decision to disband the Scorpions. After the next general election in 2009, she was nominated to chair the Portfolio Committee on Water and Environmental Affairs.

== Deputy Minister: 2010–present ==
On 31 October 2010, Sotyu was appointed as Deputy Minister of Police in a reshuffle by President Jacob Zuma. She replaced Fikile Mbalula, who had been promoted to Zuma's cabinet, and deputised Nathi Mthethwa. Johnny de Lange took over her post as chair of the Portfolio Committee on Water and Environmental Affairs.

Soon after she took office in the police ministry, Sotyu was criticised by interest groups when the Beeld quoted her as commenting on a recent criminal case by opining that South African courts were racist and handed down harsher penalties to black criminals than to white criminals. The Freedom Front Plus accused her of creating "racial tension" and the Transvaal Agriculture Union of South Africa accused her of creating "an environment where whites are given an unfair sense of guilt and where whites will become victims of hateful racist elements. This can lead to violence against whites, which can include farm attacks." Agri SA regretted that she had "played the race card" so soon after her appointment.

Sotyu served in the police ministry for six-and-a-half years. In the early hours of 31 March 2017, Zuma reshuffled his second-term cabinet, appointing Sotyu to serve as Deputy Minister of Arts and Culture under Minister Nathi Mthethwa. She remained in that position after Cyril Ramaphosa replaced Zuma as president in February 2018 and appointed a new cabinet.

After the 2019 general election, Ramaphosa appointed to Sotyu to serve as Deputy Minister of Environment, Forestry and Fisheries, a newly created portfolio; she deputises Barbara Creecy under Ramaphosa's second cabinet.

== Personal life ==
Sotyu's daughter, Boniwe Sotyu, worked at the Independent Police Investigative Directorate (IPID) and its predecessor, the Independent Complaints Directorate. In 2015, she was appointed as deputy director of investigations in IPID's Free State office, an appointment which made national headlines because Sotyu was Deputy Minister of Police at the time.
