= Department of Environmental Affairs and Tourism =

The Department of Environmental Affairs and Tourism was a department of the government of South Africa from 1994 to 2009. Political responsibility for the department rested with the Minister of Environmental Affairs and Tourism. After the election of President Jacob Zuma in May 2009, the department was divided into the Department of Environmental Affairs and the Department of Tourism.

== Ministers of Environmental Affairs and Tourism ==
No.	Name	Party	Term
1.	Dawie de Villiers	National Party	1994 to 1996
2.	Pallo Jordan	ANC	1996 to 1999
3.	Valli Moosa	ANC	1999 to 2004
4.	Marthinus van Schalkwyk	NNP/ANC	2004 to 2009
