= Minister of Trade, Industry and Competition =

South Africa Minister of Trade, Industry and Competition
- List: 10 other official names: Minister van Handel en Nywerheid (Afrikaans); uNgqongqotjhe wezeRhwebo namaBubulo (Southern Ndebele); UMphathiswa lezoRhwebo noShishino (Xhosa); Indvuna Wezohwebo Nezimboni (Zulu); Indvuna Letekuhwebelana Netetimboni (Swazi); Tona ya Bogwebi le Bohlagiši (Northern Sotho); Letona la Kgwebisano le Indasteri (Sotho); Tona la Kgwebisano le Madirelo (Tswana); Holobye wa Mbambadzo na Nḓowetshumo (Tsonga); Minisiṱa ya Mabindzu na Vumaki (Venda)
- Flag of South Africa

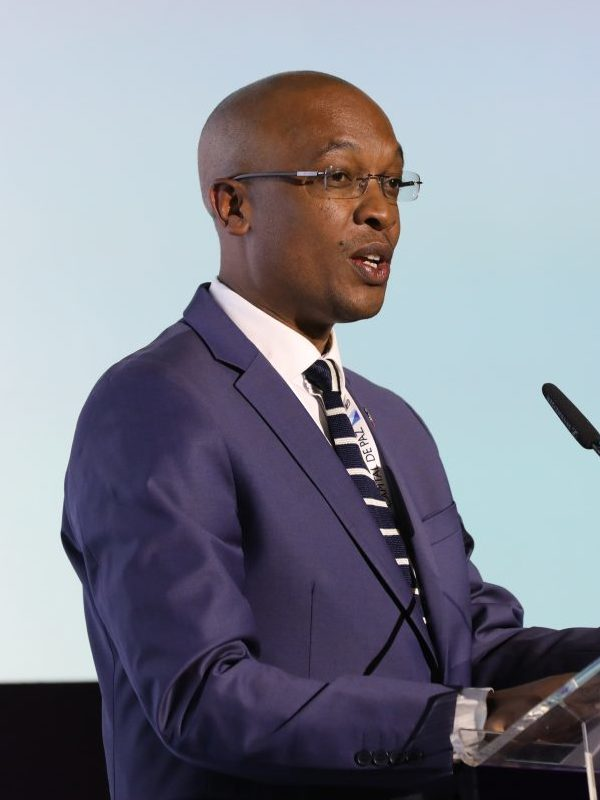
- Incumbent; Parks Tau since 30 June 2024
- Department of Trade, Industry and Competition
- Style: The Honourable
- Appointer: Cyril Ramaphosa
- Inaugural holder: Frederick Robert Moor
- Formation: 31 May 1910
- Deputy: Andrew Whitfield (3 July 2024 – 26 June 2025), Alexandra Abrahams (17 Nov 2025-) and Zuko Godlimpi
- Website: [www.thedtic.gov.za]

The minister of trade, industry and competition is a minister in the Cabinet of South Africa. The portfolio of Trade, Industry and Competition, formed in May 2019, has brought together the former Ministry of Trade and Industry and Ministry of Economic Development.

The minister is responsible for the development and implementation of industrial policy in South Africa. The ministry oversees 17 government agencies, providing for industrial funding, competition policy, black economic empowerment policy, consumer protection, trade policy and technical standards.

== List of past ministers ==
=== Commerce and industry, 1910–1912, 1933–1943 ===
Name	Portrait	Term	Party	President
Frederick Robert Moor		1910 – 1911	SAP	Louis Botha (I)
George Leuchars		1911 – 1912	SAP	Louis Botha (I)
Adriaan Fourie		1933 – 1938	UP/NP	J. B. M. Hertzog (III)
Oswald Pirow		1938 – 1939	UP	J. B. M. Hertzog (IV)
Richard Stuttaford		1939 – 1941	UP	J. B. M. Hertzog (IV)
Sidney Waterson		1941 – 1943	UP	J. B. M. Hertzog (IV)

=== Trade and industry, 1994–2019 ===
Name	Portrait	Term	Party	President
Trevor Manuel		11 May 1994 - 4 April 1996	ANC	Nelson Mandela (I)
Alec Erwin		4 April 1996 – 28 April 2004	ANC	Nelson Mandela (I); Thabo Mbeki (I)
Mandisi Mpahlwa		29 April 2004 – 10 May 2009	ANC	Thabo Mbeki (II); Kgalema Motlanthe (I)
Rob Davies		11 May 2009 – 29 May 2019	ANC	Jacob Zuma (I)(II); Cyril Ramaphosa (I)

=== Trade, industry and competition, 2019–present ===
Name	Portrait	Term	Party	President
Ebrahim Patel		30 May 2019 – 19 June 2024	ANC	Cyril Ramaphosa (II)
Parks Tau		30 June 2024 –Present	ANC	Cyril Ramaphosa (III)
