= Ntombazana Botha =

South African politician (1943–2025)

Deputy Minister of Arts and Culture
- In office 29 April 2004 – 10 May 2009
- President: Thabo Mbeki
- Minister: Pallo Jordan
- Preceded by: Buyelwa Sonjica (for Arts, Culture, Science and Technology)
- Succeeded by: Paul Mashatile

Deputy Minister of Provincial and Local Government
- In office 30 May 2001 – 28 April 2004
- President: Thabo Mbeki
- Minister: Sydney Mufamadi
- Preceded by: Position established
- Succeeded by: Nomatyala Hangana

Member of the National Assembly

Assembly Member for Eastern Cape
- In office July 1997 – 10 May 2009

Personal details
- Born: 21 July 1943
- Died: 8 November 2025 (aged 82) East London, South Africa
- Party: African National Congress

Ntombazana Gertrude Winifred Botha (21 July 1943 – 8 November 2025) was a South African politician who served as Deputy Minister of Arts and Culture from 2004 to 2009 and before that as Deputy Minister of Provincial and Local Government from 2001 to 2004. She represented the African National Congress (ANC) in the National Assembly from 1997 until 2009, when she retired from frontline politics. During the 1980s, she was involved in community organising in the anti-apartheid struggle and was the founding secretary of the United Democratic Front in East London.

== Early life and activism ==
Botha was born on 21 July 1943. Until 1986, she did bookkeeping, paralegal, and other administrative work for a range of private companies. During that time, she joined the South African Allied Workers' Union in 1980 and the United Women's Organisations in 1981. In 1983, she was instrumental in establishing structures of the United Democratic Front (UDF) in the East London region of the Cape Province. She served as secretary of that branch of the UDF until 1984 and then served as treasurer of the UDF in the Border Region from 1985 to 1986.

In 1986, Botha left the private sector to become an organising secretary for the local branch of the South African Council of Churches, where she worked until 1990. When the African National Congress (ANC) was unbanned by the apartheid government in 1990, she was secretary of the interim committee charged with establishing ANC structures in the Cape Border Region. She worked as a coordinator for Lawyers for Human Rights from 1991 to 1997, while remaining active in the local civic movement.

== Career in government: 1997–2009 ==
In July 1997, Botha was sworn in to an ANC seat in the first post-apartheid Parliament, filling a casual vacancy. In the next general election in 1999, she was elected to a full term in the National Assembly, representing the Eastern Cape constituency. From 30 May 2001 to 28 April 2004, she served as Deputy Minister of Provincial and Local Government in the government of President Thabo Mbeki. In that capacity she deputised Sydney Mufamadi, and the Mail & Guardian said that she showed "strong people skills".

She vacated that office after the 2004 general election, in which she was re-elected to her legislative seat, still serving the Eastern Cape. When he appointed his second-term cabinet after the election, Mbeki named her as Deputy Minister of Arts and Culture, under Minister Pallo Jordan. She served in that portfolio until the 2009 general election, in which she did not seek re-election to the National Assembly.

== Death ==
Botha died after a long illness on 8 November 2025, at the age of 82.
