= Department of Environmental Affairs (South Africa) =

Department overview
- Formed: 2009
- Preceding Department: Department of Environmental Affairs and Tourism
- Dissolved: 2019
- Superseding Department: Department of Environment, Forestry and Fisheries
- Jurisdiction: South Africa
- Headquarters: Pretoria, Gauteng, South Africa

The Department of Environmental Affairs was a department of the South African government with responsibility for the environment. It was created in 2009 when the Department of Environmental Affairs and Tourism was split into two departments, and was replaced in 2019 by the Department of Environment, Forestry and Fisheries which also incorporated the forestry and fisheries components from the former Department of Agriculture, Forestry and Fisheries.
