= Minister of Science, Technology and Innovation (South Africa) =

South African cabinet minister

South Africa Minister of Science, Technology and Innovation
- Flag of South Africa

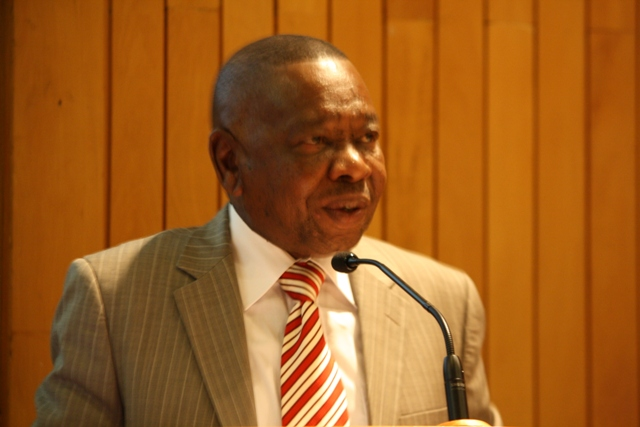
- Incumbent; Blade Nzimande since 3 July 2024
- Department of Science and Innovation
- Style: The Honourable
- Appointer: President of South Africa
- Inaugural holder: Mosibudi Mangena
- Formation: 29 April 2004
- Deputy: Nomalungelo Gina
- Website: Department of Science and Innovation

The minister of science, technology and innovation is a minister in the Cabinet of South Africa. The office was re-established in June 2024. Between 2004 and 2019, the office was called the minister of science and technology. In prior periods, the science and technology portfolio was the provenance of the minister of higher education, science and technology (from 2019 to 2024) or of the minister of arts, culture, science and technology (before 2004).

== History ==
Until 28 April 2004, science and technology was the responsibility of the minister of arts, culture, science and technology. On 28 April 2004, announcing his second cabinet, President Thabo Mbeki birfucated that portfolio, creating the new minister of science and technology, alongside a minister of arts and culture.

When President Cyril Ramaphosa announced his second-term cabinet on 29 May 2019, he announced that the Ministry of Science and Technology would be absorbed by the Ministry of Higher Education and Training, creating the enlarged portfolio of the new minister of higher education, science and technology. However, Ramaphosa reversed the merger in his third cabinet, announced on 30 June 2024; the independent post was re-established, now called the minister of science, technology and innovation.

== List of ministers ==
List of ministers responsible for science and technology, 1994–present
Title	Minister	Term		Party
Minister of Arts, Culture, Science and Technology	Ben Ngubane	1994	1996	IFP
Minister of Arts, Culture, Science and Technology	Lionel Mtshali	1996	1999	IFP
Minister of Arts, Culture, Science and Technology	Ben Ngubane	1999	2004	IFP
Minister of Science and Technology	Mosibudi Mangena	2004	2009	AZAPO
Minister of Science and Technology	Naledi Pandor	2009	2012	ANC
Minister of Science and Technology	Derek Hanekom	2012	2014	ANC
Minister of Science and Technology	Naledi Pandor	2014	2018	ANC
Minister of Science and Technology	Mmamoloko Kubayi-Ngubane	2018	2019	ANC
Minister of Higher Education, Science and Technology	Blade Nzimande	2019	2024	ANC
Minister of Science, Technology and Innovation	Blade Nzimande	2024	–	ANC
