= Nomathemba November =

Nomathemba Theresia November
- Born: September 20, 1959 (age 66); South Africa
- Citizenship: South Africa
- Occupation: Politician
- Years active: 1970s–present
- Employer: Government of South Africa
- Organizations: African National Congress (ANC); ANC Women's League
- Known for: Parliamentary service and leadership in small business development
- Office: Deputy Minister of Small Business Development
- Political party: African National Congress (ANC)

Nomathemba Theresia November (born September 20, 1959) is a South African politician who is a member of the African National Congress(ANC). She was also an associate at the National Assembly and served as the Deputy Minister of Small Business Development of the Republic of South Africa.

== Career ==
November was a member at the National Assembly (Parliament) from May 2009 to March 2017. She was assigned to the Portfolio Committee on Rural Development and Land Reform as well as the Public Works Committee until May 2014. She was part of Ad Hoc Committee on Coordinated Oversight on Service Delivery and later a member of the Portfolio Committee on Small Business Development in June 2014. She served as the Deputy Minister of Small Business Development of South Africa between 31 March 2017 and 27 February 2018. In 1997, she was a councillor at the Ikhara Hais Municipality (now Dawid Kruiper Local Municipality) in the Northern Cape where, she also served as its speaker from 2006 to 2009.

In the African National Congress, she started as a youth activist in the 1970s, became a branch Secretary in Paballelo township in Upington, a Regional Executive Committee member and later as a Provincial Executive Member of the ANC Women's League in the Northern Cape.

== See also ==
- African National Congress
- African National Congress Women's League
