= Minister of Tourism (South Africa) =

South African cabinet position

South Africa Minister of Tourism
- List: 10 other official names: Minister van Toerisme (Afrikaans); uNgqongqotjhe wezeVakatjhobukela (Southern Ndebele); UMphathiswa lezoKhenketho (Xhosa); Indvuna weZohwebo (Zulu); Indvuna Letivakashi (Swazi); Tona ya Boeti (Northern Sotho); Letona la Bohahlaudi (Sotho); Tona la Bojanala (Tswana); Holobye ya Vupfhumba (Tsonga); Minisiṱa wa Vhuendelamashango (Venda)
- Flag of South Africa

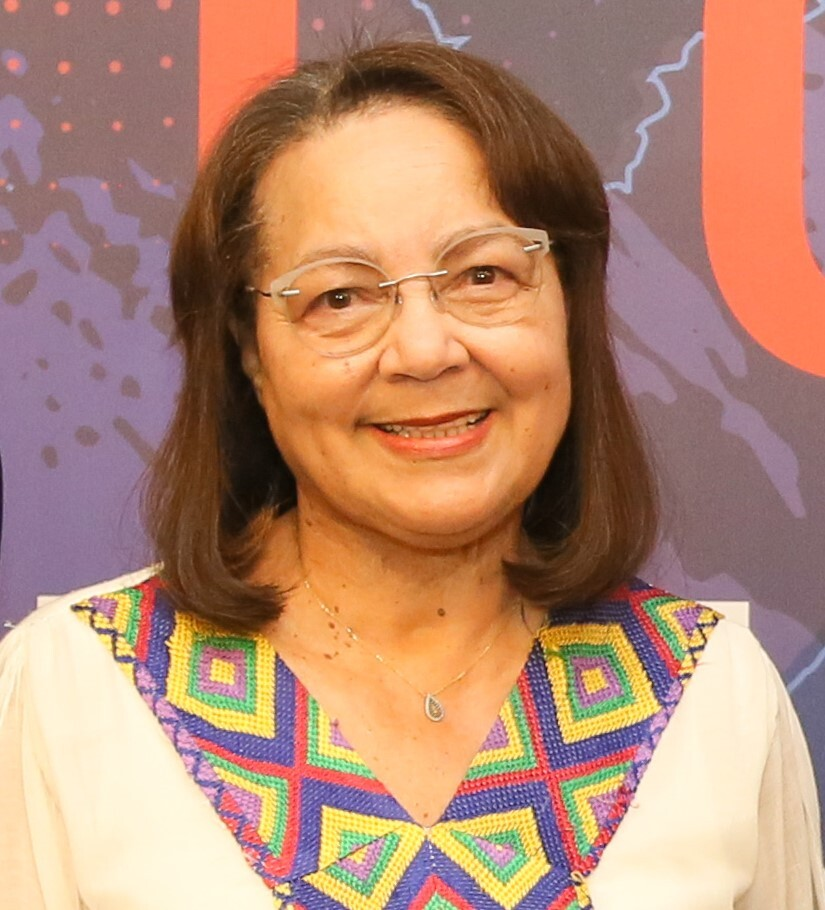
- Incumbent; Patricia De Lille since 6 March 2023
- Department of Tourism
- Style: The Honourable
- Appointer: President of South Africa
- Inaugural holder: Kent Durr
- Formation: 16 August 1989
- Deputy: Deputy Minister of Tourism
- Website: Department of Tourism

The minister of tourism is a minister in the Cabinet of South Africa. The minister has political responsibility for the Department of Tourism.

The office was established in its current form in 2009. Before then, the tourism portfolio was the responsibility of the minister of environmental affairs and tourism.

== List of ministers ==
List of ministers responsible for tourism, 1994–present
Portfolio	Name	Portrait	Term		Party	President
Environmental Affairs and Tourism	Dawie de Villiers		1994	1996	NP	Mandela
Environmental Affairs and Tourism	Pallo Jordan		1996	1999	ANC	Mandela
Environmental Affairs and Tourism	Valli Moosa		1999	2004	ANC	Mbeki
Environmental Affairs and Tourism	Marthinus van Schalkwyk		2004	2009	NNP	Mbeki
Tourism	Marthinus van Schalkwyk		2009	2014	ANC	Zuma
Tourism	Derek Hanekom		2014	2017	ANC	Zuma
Tourism	Tokozile Xasa		2017	2018	ANC	Zuma
Tourism	Derek Hanekom		2018	2019	ANC	Ramaphosa
Tourism	Mmamoloko Kubayi-Ngubane		2019	2021	ANC	Ramaphosa
Tourism	Lindiwe Sisulu		2021	2023	ANC	Ramaphosa
Tourism	Patricia De Lille		2023	–	Good	Ramaphosa
