= Fatima Hajaig =

South African politician

Fatima Hajaig (born 10 December 1938) is a South African politician, with the ruling African National Congress. She is a member of the African Union's Pan-African Parliament from South Africa. She used to be chairperson of the committee of foreign affairs of the South African parliament. She was a Deputy Minister of Foreign Affairs under President Kgalema Motlanthe.

== Education ==
Hajaig graduated from University of the Witwatersrand in 1963. In 1967, she earned her LLB from Eötvös Loránd University in Hungary.

== Comments about Jews ==
In December 2008, she summoned Israel's new ambassador to the Foreign Ministry to criticize Israeli actions in Gaza. This led to an official complaint by Israel to the South African Embassy in Tel Aviv because, it said, Hajaig insulted Elias Inbram, the Israeli Embassy's Ethiopia-born spokesman, presuming he was brought to the meeting as a token black and asking the ambassador:

When your colleagues in Europe attend a meeting like this, do they also take someone along like the person sitting next to you?

At a COSATU rally on Wednesday 14 January 2009, in Lenasia, Gauteng, she made the statement, "The control of America, just like the control of most Western countries, is in the hands of Jewish money and if Jewish money controls their country then you cannot expect anything else."

Her remarks about Jews were condemned by Foreign Affairs Minister Nkosazana Dlamini-Zuma who issued a statement saying such remarks are against foreign policy. The South African Jewish Board of Deputies filed the complaint against Hajaig to the country's Human Rights Commission.

On 3 February 2009 she apologised for any pain caused by the remarks she made at the rally. However, South African Jewish Board of Deputies national chairperson Zev Krengel said Hajaig had given only a "veiled apology" in her statement. "She is still not apologising for what she has said. She is apologising for the hurt."

On 4 February 2009, the South African President Kgalema Motlanthe gave her "a dressing down" for her perceived antisemitic comments. The South African Jewish Board of Deputies accepted her second apology.

Earlier, Cabinet had "expressed concern about the statement as it was contrary to the stated policies of this government regarding anti-Semitic sentiments."
