= Minister of Forestry, Fisheries and the Environment =

- List: 10 other official names: Minister van Omgewingsake (Afrikaans); uNgqongqotjhe wezeBhoduluko (Southern Ndebele); UMphathiswa lezeNdalo (Xhosa); Indvuna Wezindaba Zezemvelo (Zulu); Indvuna Letendzawo (Swazi); Tona ya Merero ya Tikologo (Northern Sotho); Letona la Merero ya Tikoloho (Sotho); Tona la Merero ya Tikologo (Tswana); Holobye ya swa Mbangu (Tsonga); Minisiṱa wa zwa Mupo (Venda)
- Flag of South Africa

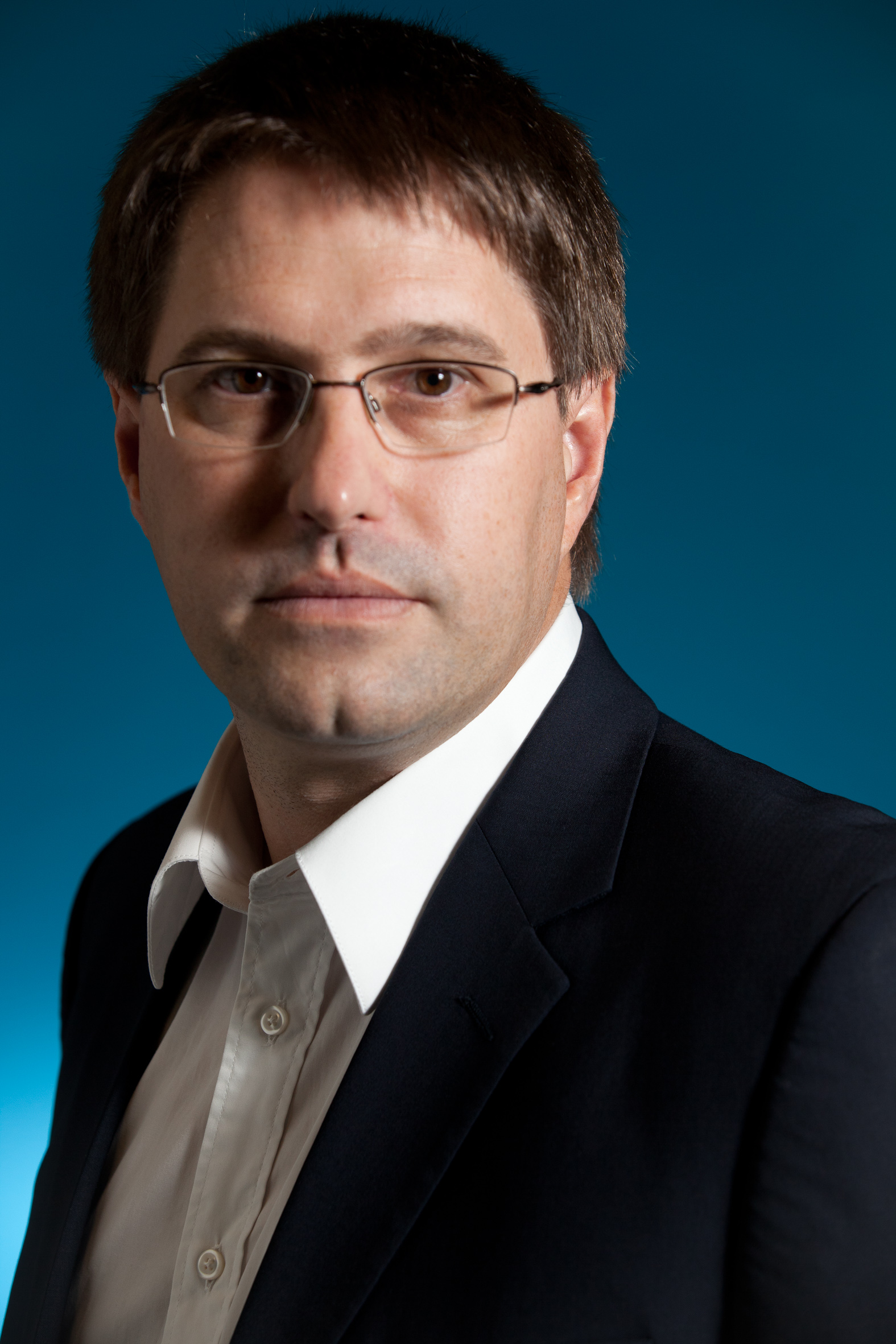
- Incumbent; David Maynier since 1 July 2026
- Department of Forestry, Fisheries and the Environment
- Appointer: President of South Africa
- Inaugural holder: Barbara Creecy
- Formation: 29 May 2019
- Deputy: Narend Singh; Bernice Swarts
- Salary: R1,811,142
- Website: www.dffe.gov.za

The Minister of Forestry, Fisheries and the Environment is the environment minister in the Cabinet of South Africa. The minister has political responsibility for the Department of Forestry, Fisheries and the Environment (DFFE).

The office was established in its current form in May 2019. Before then, the environment minister had a smaller portfolio between 2014 and 2019 as the Minister of Environmental Affairs, and an enlarged portfolio between 1994 and 2014 as the Minister of Water and Environmental Affairs (2009 to 2014) and the Minister of Environmental Affairs and Tourism (1994 to 2009).

== History ==
The environmental affairs portfolio originated in the apartheid era. From 1994, under President Nelson Mandela, it subsumed the Ministry of Tourism, becoming the Ministry of Environmental Affairs and Tourism with responsibility for the Department of Environmental Affairs and Tourism.

When he announced his first cabinet on 10 May 2009, President Jacob Zuma severed the environment portfolio from the new Ministry of Tourism and gave it the water affairs function, creating the Minister of Water and Environmental Affairs.

However, with the appointment of Zuma's second cabinet on 25 May 2014, this portfolio was bifurcated, creating the dedicated Ministry of Environmental Affairs to oversee the Department of Environmental Affairs (and a separate Ministry of Water and Sanitation to oversee water affairs).

Throughout the post-apartheid era, forestry and fisheries had not been handled by the environment portfolio, but instead were the responsibility of the Minister of Water Affairs and Forestry (until 2009) and later the Minister of Agriculture, Forestry and Fisheries (from 2009 to 2019).

When he announced his second cabinet on 29 May 2019, President Cyril Ramaphosa assigned forestry and fisheries to the environment portfolio, creating the Minister of Forestry, Fisheries and the Environment. Barbara Creecy was the inaugural holder of that office.

== List of ministers ==
List of ministers responsible for the environment, 1994–present
Portfolio	Name	Term		Party
Environmental Affairs and Tourism	Dawie de Villiers	1994	1996	NP
Environmental Affairs and Tourism	Pallo Jordan	1996	1999	ANC
Environmental Affairs and Tourism	Valli Moosa	1999	2004	ANC
Environmental Affairs and Tourism	Marthinus van Schalkwyk	2004	2009	NP
Water and Environmental Affairs	Buyelwa Sonjica	2009	2010	ANC
Water and Environmental Affairs	Edna Molewa	2010	2014	ANC
Environmental Affairs	Edna Molewa	2014	2018	ANC
Environmental Affairs	Nomvula Mokonyane	2018	2019	ANC
Forestry, Fisheries and the Environment	Barbara Creecy	2019	2024	ANC
Forestry, Fisheries and the Environment	Dion George	2024	2025	DA
Forestry, Fisheries and the Environment	Willie Aucamp	2025	2026	DA
Forestry, Fisheries and the Environment	David Maynier	2026	Incumbent	DA

== See also ==
- Environmental issues in Southern Africa
- Geography of South Africa § Environmental issues
