= Mosibudi Mangena =

South African politician

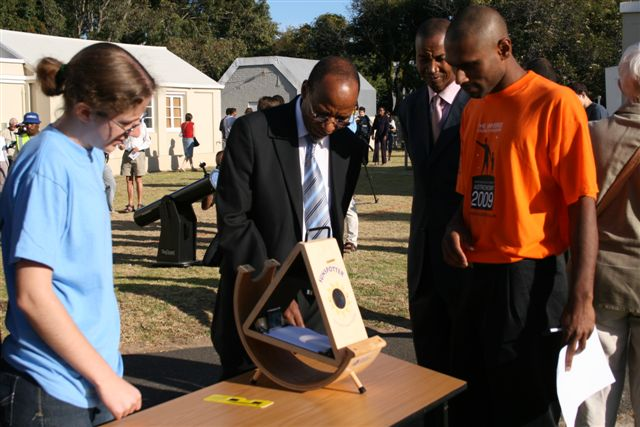
- Mangena (center) officially opening the International Year of Astronomy in 2009.

Minister of Science and Technology
- In office 29 April 2004 – 10 May 2009
- President: Thabo Mbeki
- Preceded by: Ben Ngubane
- Succeeded by: Naledi Pandor

President of the Azanian People's Organisation
- Incumbent
- Assumed office 1994

Personal details
- Born: 7 August 1947 (age 79) Tzaneen, Transvaal Province

Mosibudi Mangena OLS (born 7 August 1947 in Tzaneen, Transvaal) is a South Africa politician, former President of the Azanian People's Organisation (AZAPO). He is also currently the honorary President of AZAPO while Nelvis Qekema is the current President, this is not unusual in the Black Consciousness Movement as was the case with Steve Biko who was also the honorary President of the Black People's Convention in the early-1970s while Winfrey Kgware was the President. He was the Minister of Science and Technology (29 April 2004 - 10 May 2009).

He was born in Tzaneen, matriculated from Hebron Training College in 1969 and achieved an MSc degree in Applied Mathematics from the University of South Africa (called the University of Azania on the AZAPO website). He joined the South African Students' Organisation (SASO) and was elected onto the Students Representative Council at the University of Zululand in 1971. Moving back to Pretoria, he became chairperson of the SASO Pretoria branch in 1972. He chaired the Botswana region of the Black Consciousness Movement of Azania (BCMA) in 1981 and the BCMA central committee from 1982 to 1994. He is also the former commander in chief of the Azanian National Liberation Army (AZANLA), the former armed wing of AZAPO.

Mangena returned from exile in 1994 and became leader of AZAPO. He was appointed as Deputy Minister of Education in South Africa by President Thabo Mbeki in 2001, and he became Minister of Science and Technology in 2004.

After the resignation of Thabo Mbeki as President of South Africa in September 2008, AZAPO announced that they withdrew Mosibudi from his ministerial position.
