= Derek Hanekom =

South African politician (born 1953)

The Honourable Derek Hanekom
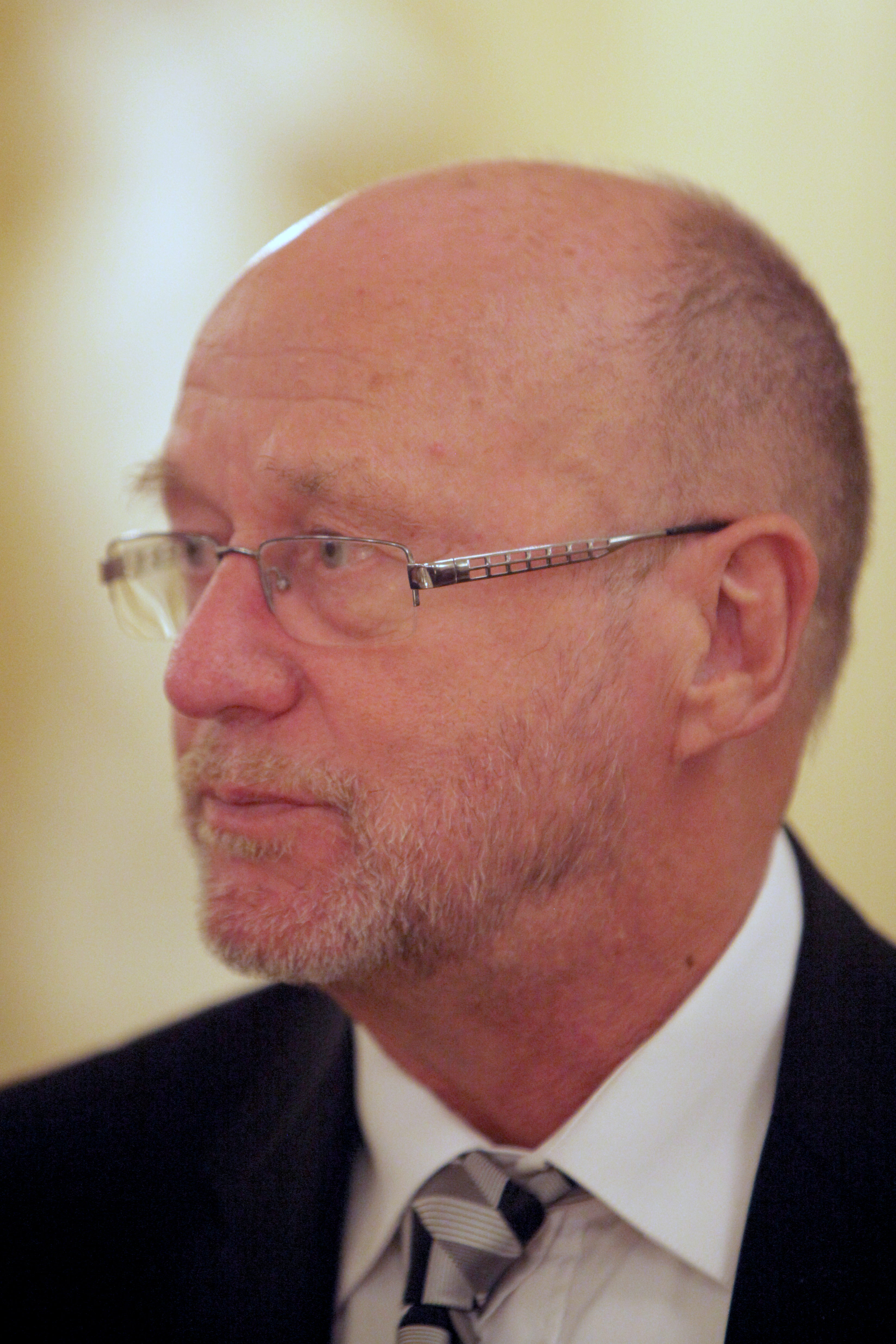
- Hanekom in 2014

Minister of Tourism
- In office 27 February 2018 – 29 May 2019
- President: Cyril Ramaphosa
- Preceded by: Tokozile Xasa
- Succeeded by: Mmamoloko Kubayi-Ngubane
- In office 25 May 2014 – 30 March 2017
- President: Jacob Zuma
- Preceded by: Marthinus van Schalkwyk
- Succeeded by: Tokozile Xasa

Minister of Science and Technology
- In office 4 October 2012 – 25 May 2014
- President: Jacob Zuma
- Preceded by: Naledi Pandor
- Succeeded by: Naledi Pandor

Minister of Agriculture and Land Affairs
- In office 1996–1999
- President: Nelson Mandela
- Preceded by: Kraai van Niekerk
- Succeeded by: Thoko Didiza

Personal details
- Born: Derek Andre Hanekom; 13 January 1953 (age 73) Cape Town, Cape Province Union of South Africa
- Party: African National Congress
- Spouse: Trish Hanekom
- Relations: Braam Hanekom
- Occupation: Politician

Derek Andre Hanekom (born 13 January 1953) is a South African retired politician, activist and former cabinet minister currently serving as the interim Chairman of South African Airways.

He is currently serving as a presidential envoy for South Africa mandated to promote investment with a focus on tourism. He was previously Minister of Tourism from 27 February 2018 until 29 May 2019. In his capacity as Minister of Tourism he was responsible for South African Tourism, the official national marketing agency of the South African government, with the goal of promoting Tourism in South Africa both locally and globally.

He previously served as Minister of Science and Technology from October 2012 until 2014. He was Deputy Minister of Science and Technology having served under the then-Presidents Kgalema Motlanthe and Thabo Mbeki, and former President Jacob Zuma in May 2009. He has a strong African National Congress (ANC) history having served three years in prison for the work he did for the ANC during apartheid, with his wife Trish Hanekom who served three years for her involvement.

He is also a former Minister of Agriculture and Land Affairs, having served under the Mandela administration. Hanekom's tenure as Minister of Land Affairs was reflective of his career in the anti-apartheid NGO sector and he was selected by former President Nelson Mandela partly because of his ability as an Afrikaner to negotiate with white landowners. Hanekom's tenure as minister was marked by an affinity for redistribution as opposed to retribution, and rights as opposed to property. Some have cited a strong contrast with his successor in the ministry during the Mbeki administration, Thoko Didiza.

Hanekom was a member of the ANC National Executive Committee from 1994 to 2022 and the NEC deployed to the Western Cape - the only province the ANC does not govern.

== Personal life ==
Hanekom was born in Cape Town, South Africa on 13 January 1953. He spent his school career in Cape Town, attending the German Primary School and then matriculating from prominent Afrikaans school, Jan van Riebeeck High School in 1970. Hanekom went on to complete his compulsory conscription in the South African Defence Force between 1971 and 1973. Thereafter, Hanekom travelled abroad where he worked for various organisations including working on farms, factories and building sites. He then returned to South Africa in his early twenties where he continued farming. Working the land, Hanekom was a dairy, poultry, and vegetable farmer from 1978 - 1983.

Hanekom is married to academic Patricia (Trish) Hanekom.

== Struggle history ==
As a 23-year-old in 1976, Hanekom was arrested for participating in a peaceful candlelight demonstration at John Vorster Square, the Police Headquarters in Johannesburg. Four years later, in 1980, Hanekom and Patricia joined the ANC, conducting underground activities while continuing to farm on a smallholding in Magaliesburg. Patricia and Hanekom fed information to the parent body ANC, such as the apartheid Defence Force's attempts to overthrow the Mozambican government through the rebel movement, Renamo. Both were then arrested in 1983. They were initially charged with high treason, the worst offence against the State, but the charge was subsequently reduced due to the international sensitivity of the case.

After spending three years in prison, Hanekom started work with the trade union movement in Johannesburg. Patricia was released a year later, in 1987, but was subsequently deported to Zimbabwe, where the couple went into exile for three years. During this period, Hanekom served as the co-ordinator of the Popular History Trust in the capital Harare.

After three years in exile and as the apartheid government unbanned previously banned political organisations, Hanekom returned to South Africa in 1990 to work at the headquarters of the ANC, where he was responsible for policy formulation on land and agricultural matters, during the period of negotiations prior to the first democratic elections in 1994.

== Career in government ==
Under founding democratic President Nelson Mandela, Hanekom was appointed Minister of Agriculture and Land Affairs from 1996 to 1999. In his capacity, Hanekom piloted various reform bills through Parliament which aimed to redress the injustices and inequities caused by apartheid laws and the 1913 Land Act. Much of the South African land reform legislation was initiated, drafted, and enacted during Hanekom's term. This legislation laid the foundation for land reform in the post-apartheid era.

From 1999 to 2004, Hanekom served as a Member of Parliament on various Parliamentary Committees. In April 2004, Hanekom was appointed Deputy Minister of Science and Technology, a position he served in until he was promoted in October 2012 to Minister of Science and Technology. As Minister, Hanekom served until 25 May 2014 before moving his portfolio to Tourism.

Hanekom was replaced as Minister of Tourism on 31 March 2017 but remained an ANC member of parliament after he filed a motion of no confidence against President Jacob Zuma. He was one of five ministers who lost their positions following their criticism of the president's controversial relationship with the Gupta family and accusations of corruption against President Zuma. President Cyril Ramaphosa appointed him to the ministerial post once again on 27 February 2018.

=== Resignation from government ===
Following the 2019 national elections, President Ramaphosa appointed Mmamoloko Kubayi-Ngubane as the new Minister of Tourism. Hanekom resigned as an MP on 11 June 2019.

== Later career ==
Hanekom was a member of the ANC's National Executive Committee since 1994; National Working Committee; Chairperson of the National Disciplinary Committee and NEC Convener of the Western Cape.

He also serves as the Deputy Chairperson of the Board of the Ahmed Kathrada Foundation.

In August 2019 Hanekom took former President Jacob Zuma to court for defamation of character following Zuma's allegation on Twitter that Hanekom was a "known enemy agent". The court found Zuma's statement to be false and deflationary and ordered Zuma to issue a full and unconditional apology and retraction of his allegation.

=== Retirement ===
Ahead of the ANC's 55th National Conference in December 2022, Hanekom announced that he had declined the nomination for another term on the ANC NEC and would be retiring from politics at the conference. Hanekom said in an interview with Eyewitness News that he would continue being "critical voice" in the party. In April 2023, Hanekom was appointed as non-executive Chairman of South African Airways.

Political offices
Preceded by Andre Fourie	Minister of Land Affairs; 1994–1996	Succeeded by himself as Minister of Agriculture and Land Affairs
Preceded by Kraai van Niekerk as Minister of Agriculture	Minister of Agriculture and Land Affairs; 1996–1999	Succeeded by Thoko Didiza
Preceded by himself as Minister of Land Affairs	Minister of Agriculture and Land Affairs; 1996–1999	Succeeded by Thoko Didiza
Preceded by Naledi Pandor	Minister of Science and Technology; 2012-2014	Succeeded by Naledi Pandor
Preceded by Marthinus van Schalkwyk	Minister of Tourism; 2014-2017	Succeeded by Tokozile Xasa
