= Jean Swanson-Jacobs =

South African politician (1955–2013)

Deputy Minister of Social Development
- In office 29 April 2004 – 10 May 2009
- President: Thabo Mbeki; Kgalema Motlanthe
- Minister: Zola Skweyiya
- Succeeded by: Bathabile Dlamini

Member of the National Assembly
- In office 1997 – 10 May 2009

Personal details
- Born: 24 November 1955
- Died: 7 July 2013 (aged 57) Cape Town, South Africa
- Citizenship: South Africa
- Party: African National Congress
- Education: University of Cape Town; University of the Western Cape (PhD)

Jean Swanson-Jacobs (née Swanson; 24 November 1955 – 7 July 2013), formerly known as Jean Benjamin, was a South African politician who served as Deputy Minister of Social Development from April 2004 until May 2009. She represented the African National Congress (ANC) in the National Assembly from 1997 to 2009. A social scientist by profession, she was formerly an anti-apartheid activist in Cape Town.

== Early life and career ==
Swanson-Jacobs was born on 24 November 1955 and grew up in Bellville-South outside Cape Town in the former Cape Province. After matriculating from Immaculata High School in Cape Town, she attended the University of the Western Cape (UWC), but she was expelled in 1973 for her political activities in the anti-apartheid youth movement. She subsequently went into exile in London to avoid being coerced to turn state's witness in the trial of the SASO Nine. She earned a bachelor's degree there in 1980 and returned to the Cape the same year.

She resumed her studies, completing a master's degree at the University of Cape Town in 1984. By the mid-1980s, she was a lecturer in social psychology at UWC, where she pursued a doctorate in same subject. She became the inaugural chairperson of UWC's Association of Democratic Educators and was also active in the UWC Action Committee, as well as in broader civil society groups including the United Women's Congress and Federation of South African Women. When the ANC was unbanned by the apartheid government in 1990, she served on the executive of her local ANC branch in Belville.

Over the next few years, she rose in the ANC ranks, joining the party's Provincial Executive Committee in the Western Cape. She also served on ANC committees for the development of post-apartheid language and cultural policy. She continued to lecture at UWC and completed her doctorate, with a thesis about language use in the Western Cape, in 1994. She was the first black woman to complete a doctorate at UWC's social psychology department.

== Career in government: 1997–2009 ==
Swanson-Jacobs was sworn in to an ANC seat in Parliament in 1997, and she was subsequently elected to two consecutive terms in the National Assembly in 1999 and 2004. After the 2004 general election, President Thabo Mbeki appointed her to deputise Minister Zola Skweyiya as Deputy Minister of Social Development. She retired from Parliament after the 2009 general election.

== Personal life and death ==
She married Michael Benjamin in 1981 and had three children. The marriage ended in 1998 and she married Aubrey Jacobs in 2007. She died on 7 July 2013 in Cape Town after suffering a stroke.
