= Marthinus van Schalkwyk =

South African politician (born 1959)

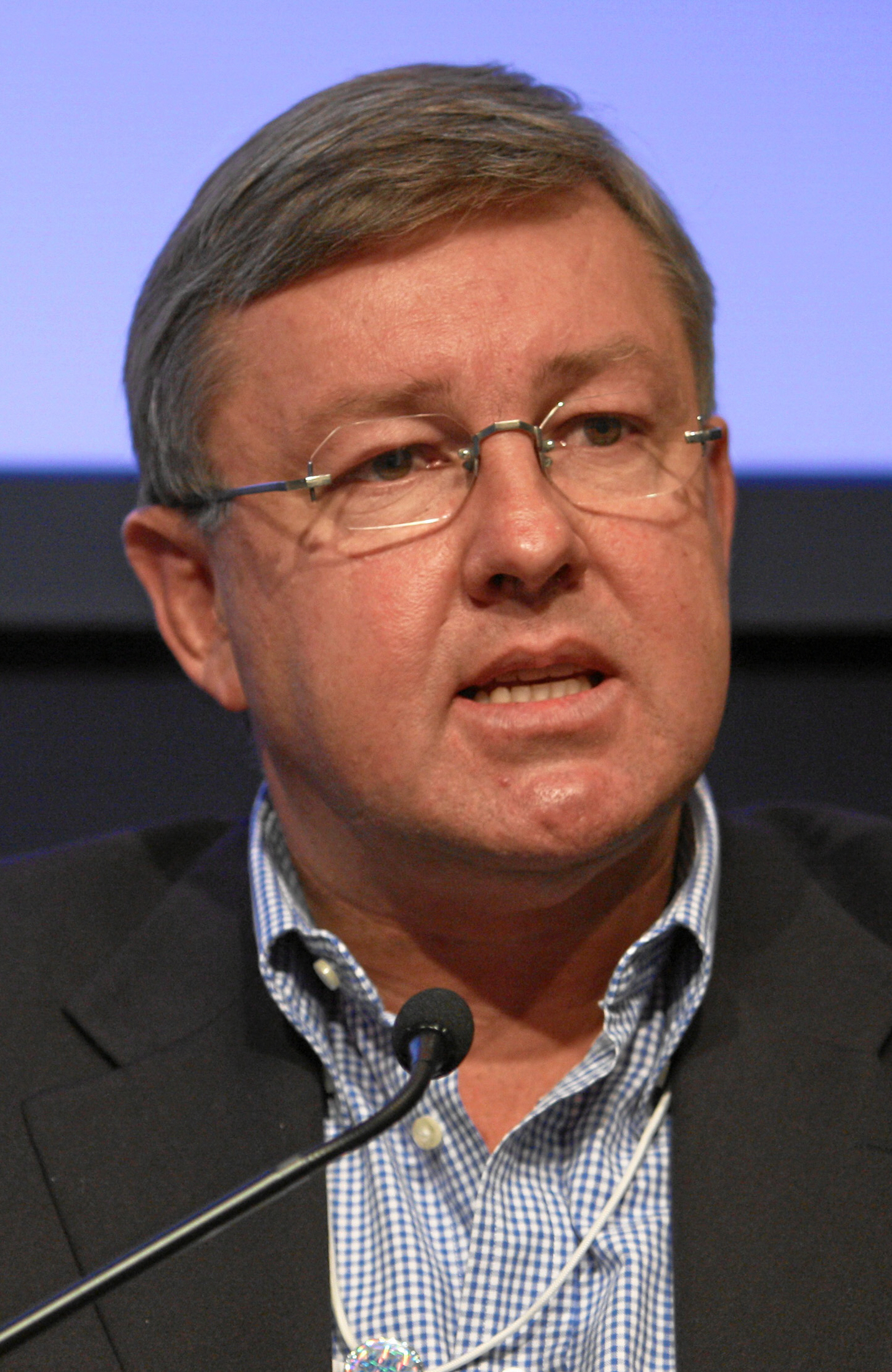
- Van Schalkwyk in 2009

Minister of Tourism
- In office 10 May 2009 – 25 May 2014
- President: Jacob Zuma
- Preceded by: Portfolio created
- Succeeded by: Derek Hanekom

Minister of Environmental Affairs and Tourism
- In office 29 April 2004 – 10 May 2009
- President: Thabo Mbeki; Kgalema Motlanthe
- Preceded by: Valli Moosa
- Succeeded by: Portfolio split

Leader of the Opposition
- In office 1997–1999
- Preceded by: Frederik Willem de Klerk
- Succeeded by: Tony Leon

4th Premier of the Western Cape
- In office 21 June 2002 – 28 April 2004
- Preceded by: Peter Marais
- Succeeded by: Ebrahim Rasool

Personal details
- Born: Marthinus Christoffel Johannes van Schalkwyk; 10 November 1959 (age 66) Pietersburg, South Africa
- Party: African National Congress
- Other political affiliations: National Party (1980s–1997); New National Party (1997–2005)
- Spouse: Suzette Minama Labuschagne
- Children: 2
- Education: Rand Afrikaans University (MA, BProc)
- Occupation: Politician; ambassador

Military service
- Allegiance: South Africa
- Branch/service: South African Defence Force
- Years of service: 1978–1979

Marthinus Christoffel Johannes van Schalkwyk (born 10 November 1959) is a South African politician, academic, and lawyer, who serves as High Commissioner to Australia. He previously served as MP and Minister of Tourism in the Cabinet of South Africa. Formerly Premier of the Western Cape and Leader of the Opposition in the Parliament of South Africa, he was the leader of the New National Party from its inception on 8 September 1997 until its dissolution on 9 April 2005. He was appointed Minister of Environmental Affairs and Tourism in the Thabo Mbeki administration after merging his party with the ruling African National Congress (ANC), despite the poor performance of the former in the 2004 General Election.

== Early life and career ==
Van Schalkwyk matriculated from Pietersburg High School in 1977. He was a national serviceman in the South African Defence Force (SADF) from 1978 to 1979 and later attended the Rand Afrikaans University, where he earned a Masters of Arts in political science and a B Proc. (a junior legal degree). As a prominent student leader of whites in the 1980s, he was a founding member and chairman of Jeugkrag (Afrikaans for Youth Power), an organisation purportedly opposed to the Afrikaner establishment, but which was secretly funded by military intelligence. Later, he lectured Political Science at Rand Afrikaans University (RAU) and Stellenbosch University.

== Political career ==
His political career began during the late apartheid years at the Rand Afrikaans University as chairman of the Student Representative Council (SRC), the Afrikaanse Studentebond (ASB), and later of the Ruiterwag, the youth wing of the Broederbond.

Van Schalkwyk succeeded Frederik Willem de Klerk as leader of the National Party in 1996, and reorganised it on 8 September 1997 as the New National Party in a bid to distance the party from its apartheid past. He remained the NNP's leader until its dissolution on 9 April 2005. He also served as Premier of the Western Cape and Leader of the Opposition in the Parliament of South Africa.

Informally, he was referred to by detractors as kortbroek (lit. "shorts"), a name he earned because of his boyish appearance and lack of political experience when compared to his predecessor, Frederik Willem de Klerk. He was one of the few National Party politicians who remained active in politics after the party's decline.

In August 2004 it was announced that Van Schalkwyk would become a member of the ANC, and that the NNP would be disbanded in 2005 or 2006 at the latest. This decision was finalized on 9 April 2005, when the party's federal committee overwhelmingly endorsed its regional committees' recommendation to disband the party as soon as municipal election results were finalised.

=== Environmental Affairs and Tourism work ===
On 29 April 2004 Van Schalkwyk was appointed by President Thabo Mbeki as Minister of Environmental Affairs and Tourism for South Africa. He held the position until May 2009, when a new Ministry of Water and Environmental Affairs was created and he became Minister of Tourism.

Van Schalkwyk became President of the African Ministerial Conference on the Environment (AMCEN) in June 2008, when South Africa assumed the presidency of AMCEN at the beginning of its 12th Session.

In March 2010, he was nominated by South African President Jacob Zuma to succeed Yvo de Boer as the Executive Secretary of the United Nations Framework Convention on Climate Change. The vote did not go his way and on 17 May 2010 de Boer was succeeded by Costa Rican diplomat Christiana Figueres who had been involved with the Center for Sustainable Development in the Americas since the early 1990s.

In its annual review of ministerial performance for 2013 the Mail & Guardian gave van Schalkwyk a C grade, concluding that "With inadequate political credentials, Marthinus van Schalkwyk has justified his stay in Cabinet long after the demise of his New National Party by actually doing his work. Tourism figures have improved year by year and his department has consistently tried to innovate to attract more visitors ... Van Schalkwyk may not return after elections, but under him tourism has grown into a long-pants department."

== Ambassador ==
Van Schalkwyk was South Africa's ambassador to Greece from 2015 to 2019. In April 2019, he transferred from Athens to Australia for the next four years as High Commissioner.

== Personal life ==
Van Schalkwyk is married to Suzette Minama Labuschagne and has a son, Christiaan, and a daughter, Maryke.

Political offices
Preceded by Peter Marais	Premier of the Western Cape; 21 June 2002 – 23 April 2004	Succeeded by Ebrahim Rasool
Preceded by Valli Moosa	Minister of Environmental Affairs and Tourism; 2004 – 2009	Succeeded by Buyelwa Sonjica as Minister of Water and Environmental Affairs
Preceded by Valli Moosa	Minister of Environmental Affairs and Tourism; 2004 – 2009	Succeeded by himself as Minister of Tourism
Preceded by himself as Minister of Environmental Affairs and Tourism	Minister of Tourism; 2009 – 2014	Succeeded by Derek Hanekom
Party political offices
Preceded by F.W. de Klerk as Leader of the National Party	Leader of the New National Party; 1997 – 2005	Party disbanded
