= Department of Tourism (South Africa) =

South African government department

- List: 10 other official names: Departement van Toerisme (Afrikaans); umNyango wezeVakatjhobukela (Southern Ndebele); iSebe lezoKhenketho (Xhosa); umnyango weZohwebo (Zulu); Litiko Letivakashi (Swazi); Kgoro ya Boeti (Northern Sotho); Lefapha la Bohahlaudi (Sotho); Lefapha la Bojanala (Tswana); Ndzawulo ya Vupfhumba (Tsonga); Muhasho wa Vhuendelamashango (Venda)
- Official logo of the Department of Tourism

Department overview
- Preceding Department: Department of Environmental Affairs and Tourism
- Jurisdiction: Government of South Africa
- Headquarters: Tourism House, Pretoria
- Annual budget: R2.3 billion (2024/2025)
- Ministers responsible: Patricia de Lille, Minister of Toursim; Maggie Sotyu, Deputy Minister of Tourism
- Website: www.tourism.gov.za

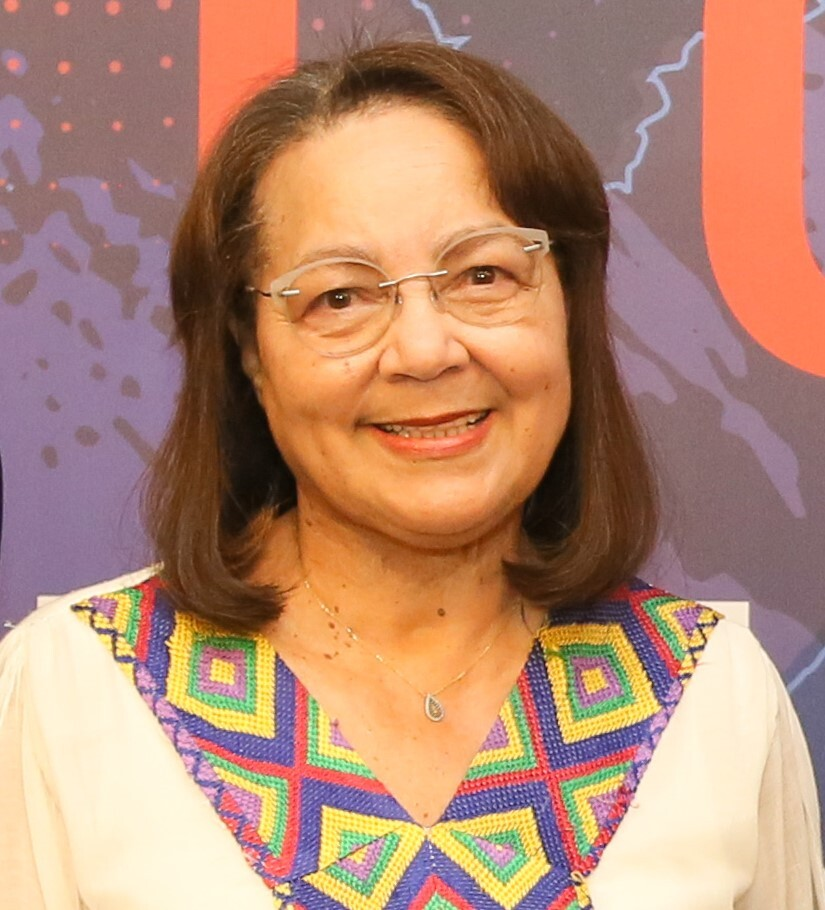
Patricia de Lille, the current Minister of Tourism in the South African government

The Department of Tourism is one of the departments of the South African Government. It is responsible for promoting and developing tourism, both from other countries to South Africa, and within South Africa.

The current political head of the department is the Minister of Tourism, Patricia de Lille who replaced Lindiwe Sisulu in 2023.

In her capacity as Minister of Tourism she is responsible for South African Tourism; the official national marketing agency of the South African government, with the goal of promoting tourism in South Africa both locally and globally.

== See also ==
- Departments of the Government of South Africa
- Government of South Africa
