= Lindiwe Hendricks =

South African politician

Lindiwe Benedicta Hendricks

Minister of Water Affairs and Forestry
- In office 22 May 2006 – 10 May 2009
- President: Thabo Mbeki; Kgalema Motlanthe
- Preceded by: Buyelwa Sonjica
- Succeeded by: Buyelwa Sonjica

Minister of Minerals and Energy
- In office 22 June 2005 – 22 May 2006
- President: Thabo Mbeki
- Preceded by: Phumzile Mlambo-Ngcuka
- Succeeded by: Buyelwa Sonjica

Personal details
- Born: 29 July 1957 (age 68) Vryburg, Northern Cape; Union of South Africa
- Party: African National Congress
- Profession: Attorney

Lindiwe Benedicta Hendricks (born 29 July 1957 in Vryburg, Northern Cape), formerly known as Lindiwe Ngwane, is a South African politician and a member of the National Assembly. She served as Minister of Water Affairs and Forestry in the Department of Water Affairs and Forestry from 22 May 2006 to 10 May 2009.

She previously served as Minister of Minerals and Energy from 2005 to 2006, and Deputy Minister of Trade and Industry from 1999 to 2005. She was a partner of Ngwane & Ngwane Attorneys, a law firm based in Durban, from 1986 to 1988, and was an attorney at the Supreme Court from 1995 to 1999.
