= Mohammed Valli Moosa =

Former South African politician (born 1957)

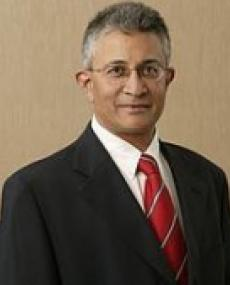
- Moosa in 2016

Minister of Environmental Affairs and Tourism
- In office 17 June 1999 – 29 April 2004
- President: Thabo Mbeki
- Preceded by: Pallo Jordan
- Succeeded by: Marthinus van Schalkwyk

Minister of Constitutional Development
- In office May 1996 – 16 June 1999
- President: Nelson Mandela
- Preceded by: Roelf Meyer
- Succeeded by: Sydney Mufamadi

Member of Constitutional Assembly
- In office 9 May 1994 – 11 October 1996

Personal details
- Born: 9 February 1957 (age 69) Johannesburg, South African
- Education: BSC (Mathematics) UKZN Lenasia Secondary School

Mohammed Valli Moosa (born 9 February 1957) is a South African politician and advocate. A veteran of the South African freedom struggle, he worked closely with Nelson Mandela, served as negotiator for the ANC, and participated in drafting the South African Constitution. Valli served in President Mandela's cabinet as minister of constitutional development, and in President Mbeki's government as environment minister. He joined the corporate sector in 2004 and currently serves as chairperson for WWF(SA) and as chairperson of the Constitution Hill Trust. He has previously served on the boards of Anglo Platinum, Eskom, Sanlam and Sappi Ltd. Valli served as a facilitator in the global climate change negotiations for a number of years. He previously served as president of the International Union for the Conservation of Nature (IUCN), as chairman of the UN Commission on Sustainable Development and as deputy chairperson of South Africa's Presidential Climate Commission.

== Early life and education ==
Valli Moosa was born on 9 February 1957 in Johannesburg. His family was forcibly moved to Lenasia with the implementation of the Group Areas Act in the early 1960s. In 1971 at the age of 14, Valli was involved in the Republic Day burning of the apartheid flag and refusal to sing the Apartheid National Anthem, "Die Stem".

After being turned down by the University of the Witwatersrand, he enrolled at the University of KwaZulu-Natal, where he obtained a BSc degree in mathematics and physics in 1978.

After graduating he returned to Lenasia, where he was a mathematics teacher from 1979 to 1981 and a mathematics course writer at the South African College of Higher Education in 1982. In 1981 he was dismissed from his teaching post because of his anti-apartheid views.

== Freedom struggle ==
Valli joined the Black Consciousness Movement (BCM) in the 1970s and was the branch secretary of the Durban Westville branch. He was also an executive member of the South African Students' Organisation (SASO) when it was banned in 1977. Valli played an important role in the campaign against the apartheid-era South African Indian Council. He became one of the founder members of the revived Transvaal Indian Congress (TIC) in 1983.

Valli contributed to the creation of a progressive non-racial network of democrats across the country, through mass-based residents and civic organisations.

He was a founding member of the United Democratic Front (South Africa)(UDF) 1983 and served on its National Committee. From 1985 to 1989 he served as the acting national general secretary of the UDF.

He was also a member of the National Reception Committee. This committee was responsible for managing the reception of former president Nelson Mandela and other political prisoners (1988–1990). He served as secretary of the Internal Leadership Core of the ANC (1990–1991). The Internal Leadership Core, under the chairpersonship of Walter Sisulu was responsible for establishing and managing the legal organisational structure of the ANC.

Valli was responsible for the organisation of the first ANC National Conference in over thirty years (1991).

Valli was elected to the National Executive Council (NEC) of the African National Congress (ANC). He served on the NEC for a total of 19 years. He resigned from the NEC in 2009 but retained his membership of the party.

== Detention without trial ==
Valli served lengthy periods in detention without trial in the 1980s. In 1980 he was detained and held in solitary confinement in John Vorster Square. In 1985 he was detained for three months and held at the Sandton police station. He was arrested in July 1987 in Port Elizabeth and transferred to Johannesburg Prison, where he was incarcerated for another fourteen months.

In 1988 he escaped from prison together with Murphy Morobe and Vusi Khanyile and took refuge in the American consulate.

In the process they created international awareness through the media about the plight of detainees in South Africa.

In 1989 Valli was detained for 6 weeks. He was served with a banning order and placed under house arrest. The banning order was lifted in February 1990 with the unbanning of the ANC and other political organisations.

== South African Constitution ==
Valli's portfolio on the National Executive Committee of the ANC from 1991 to 1994 was the negotiations to end Apartheid. As a result, he was responsible for the work of the Negotiations Commission and reported directly to the NEC on all matters related to the negotiations.

As secretary and chief executive of the ANC Negotiations Commission, Valli represented the ANC at CODESA. He was responsible for the conduct and the management of the negotiations with the Apartheid Government, including: the drafting of the Interim Constitution; the transitional arrangements for the smooth handover from apartheid to democracy; management of the internal processes within the ANC; consultations with stakeholders; and management of the media and communications.

After South Africa's first democratic elections in 1994, Valli was elected to the Constitutional Assembly. As the ANC's chief negotiator in the Constitutional Assembly until 1996, he participated in the writing of the final Constitution. The democratic Constitution was adopted on 11 October 1996. Former president Nelson Mandela signed the constitution into law in Sharpeville, Gauteng, on 10 December 1996.

== Political office (1994–2004) ==
After the adoption of the Constitution in 1996, President Mandela appointed Valli Moosa as minister of constitutional development. In this role he played a major role in the dismantling of Apartheid structures and the establishment of democratic institutions of governance.

In the 1999 elections Valli was once again elected to parliament. President Mbeki appointed him as minister for environment and tourism. During this time, he established the Great Limpopo Transfrontier Park by overseeing the removal of the fence between the Kruger National Park and Mozambique's Limpopo National Park. He famously introduced South Africa's first laws regulating the use of plastic shopping bags.

He hosted the 2002 Johannesburg UN World Summit on Sustainable Development.

He represented South Africa at various sessions of the UN Convention on Climate Change and was appointed as the Global facilitator for the final negotiations on the Kyoto Protocol at the seventh Conference of the Parties (COP7) held in Marrakesh in 2001. He served as the chairperson of the UN Commission on Sustainable Development (2002–2003).

== Environmental protection and climate change ==
- President of the IUCN (International Union for the Conservation of Nature). (2004–2008)

Valli was nominated for the IUCN presidency after retiring from politics in recognition of his role in global events.
He was elected the global president of IUCN by an overwhelming majority of 432 votes to 199 at the 3rd World Conservation Congress in Bangkok in November 2004.
He led the Union of over 1,000 governmental and non-governmental member organisations over the next four years.

- Facilitator in the Paris Climate Agreement (2014–2015)

Valli Moosa acted as mediator of informal talks among the chief climate negotiators from a group of influential countries. The report of these negotiations resulted in the Paris Climate Agreement.
“The report outlines the emerging elements of a Paris climate agreement based on in-depth discussions among senior climate negotiators from leading countries. The report foresees a durable legal agreement that sets binding commitments for all parties, holds countries accountable, and works to progressively strengthen global ambition.
The report was prepared by Valli and Harald Dovland of Norway, co-chairs of a year-long dialogue among negotiators from China, the United States and 20 other European, Asian, Latin American and African countries. The report draws on nearly 100 hours of frank discussions among negotiators, who participated in their personal capacities and met eight times from March 2014 through May 2015.”

- Member of the CCICED (China Council for International Co-operation on Environment and Development) from 2008 to 2012.
- Chairman of UN High Level Panel on the CDM (Clean Development Mechanism) Policy Dialogue in 2012.
- Non-executive chairman of WWF(SA) (2008 to 2019) and rejoined WWF(SA) in the same role in February 2024
- Board member of the Endangered Wildlife Trust (2019–2024).
- Member of the Steering Committee of the Tokyo-based International Cool Earth Forum
- Deputy chairperson and head of the Presidential Climate Commission (PCC) (2020–2024)

The PCC is composed of representatives of trade unions, environment NGO's, business and the government.
The government is represented by seven serving cabinet ministers.
Its main purpose is to garner consensus among the social partners on the national pathway to a net-zero economy by 2050.

== Business career ==
Valli Moosa previously held the following positions:

- Partner in the Johannesburg-based private equity fund manager, the Lereko Metier Capital Growth Fund
- Non-executive director of South African Airways (2004–2005)
- Non-executive director of the Mumbai-based Indian Hotels Company ltd (2004 to 2005)
- Non-executive chairman of Eskom (2005–2008)
- Non-executive director of Sanlam (2004 to 2018)
- Non-executive director of Imperial Holdings (2005 to 2018)
- Non-executive chairman of Anglo Platinum ltd (2008 to 2019)
- Non-executive chairman of Sun International (2005 to 2019)
- Non-executive director of Lereko Investments (2004 - 2023)
- Lead independent director of Sappi Ltd (2010–2024)

== Current activities ==
Valli Moosa currently serves as chairperson of the Constitution Hill Trust and as Chairperson of WWF South Africa He is also a member of the auditor-general's Advisory Committee.

Valli's involvement in the drafting of South Africa's constitution in the early 1990s has come full circle as he continues to champion democracy and the values and importance of the constitution.

“He says the current system of government is not fulfilling the vision of the Constitution by not doing enough to reduce inequality in the country.”

After nearly 30 years of democracy Valli is advocating for a new electoral system that will demand greater accountability of members of parliament.

He is an advocate of political party funding transparency and worked hard to get the Political Party Funding Act passed by parliament. Valli describes the act as "the single biggest improvement to South African democracy since the adoption of the Constitution in 1996”.

== Other interests ==
He is a keen hiker and a lover of classical music.

Preceded by Khoza, R.	Chairperson of Eskom Board; 2005–2008	Succeeded by Godsell, R.M.
