= Buyelwa Sonjica =

South African politician

Buyelwa Patience Sonjica
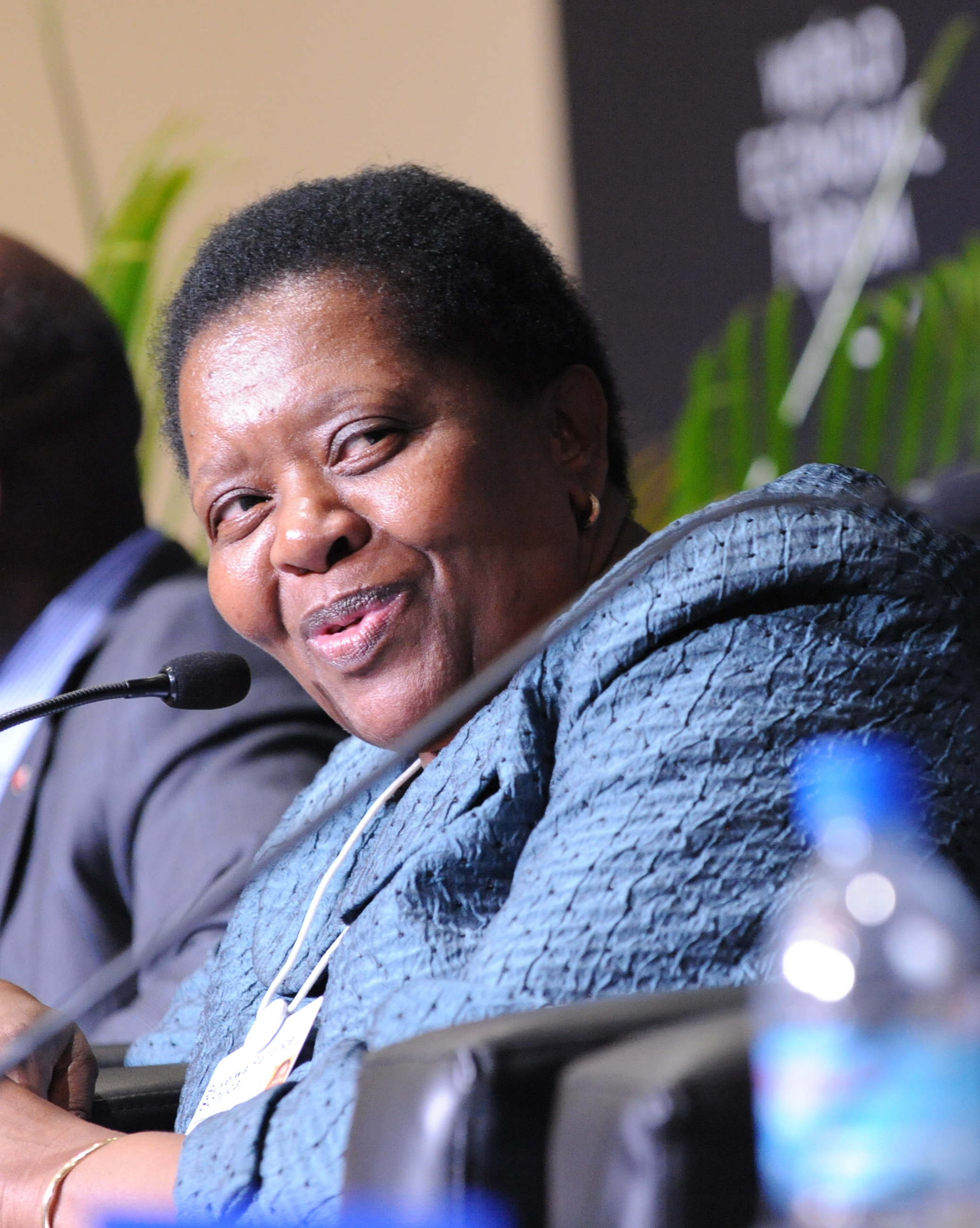
- Buyelwa Sonjica at the World Economic Forum on Africa in 2010

Minister of Water Affairs and Forestry
- In office 10 May 2009 – 1 November 2010
- President: Jacob Zuma
- Preceded by: Lindiwe Hendricks
- Succeeded by: Edna Molewa

Minister of Minerals and Energy
- In office 22 May 2006 – 10 May 2009
- President: Kgalema Motlanthe
- Succeeded by: Dipuo Peters

Minister of Water Affairs and Forestry
- In office 29 April 2004 – 22 May 2006
- President: Thabo Mbeki
- Preceded by: Ronnie Kasrils
- Succeeded by: Lindiwe Hendricks

Personal details
- Born: 23 March 1950 (age 76)
- Party: African National Congress

Buyelwa Patience Sonjica (born 23 March 1950) is a South African politician who served as Minister of Water and Environmental Affairs from May 2009 until November 2010.

== Early life ==
Sonjica received degrees from Vista University and Rhodes University. She worked as a student nurse and a teacher.

== Politics ==
In 1976–77 she was involved in student politics in East London. She was active against the Apartheid regime in the UDF and SADTU when the African National Congress was illegal in South Africa. After the readmission of the ANC, she became active for it in Port Elizabeth.

Since the 1994 general election, Sonjica was a member of South Africa's Parliament. She was Deputy minister in the Department for Arts and Culture. In 2004, she was appointed as Minister in the Department of Water Affairs and Forestry, in 2006 as Minister for Minerals and Energy, and in 2009 as Minister of Water and Environmental Affairs.
