= Rob Davies (politician) =

South African politician

The Honourable Dr Rob Davies MP
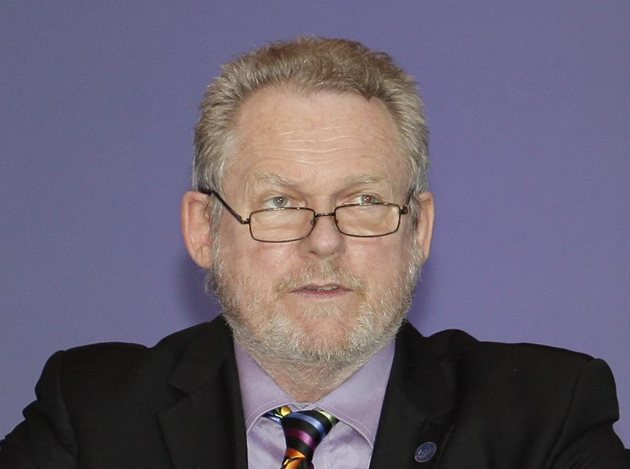
- Rob Davies in December 2013

Minister of Trade and Industry
- In office 11 May 2009 – 29 May 2019
- President: Jacob Zuma; Cyril Ramaphosa
- Preceded by: Mandisa Mpahlwa
- Succeeded by: Ebrahim Patel

Personal details
- Born: Robert Haydn Davies; 12 May 1948 (age 78)
- Party: South African Communist Party
- Other political affiliations: African National Congress
- Education: Rhodes University (BA); University of Southampton (MA); University of Sussex (PhD)

Robert Haydn Davies (born 12 May 1948) was minister of trade and industry of South Africa from 2009 to 2019.

== Education ==
Davies obtained his BA Honours in economics from Rhodes University and then went on to complete an MA in international relations at the University of Southampton, and a PhD in political studies from the University of Sussex.

== Political career ==
Due to his anti-apartheid activities Davies left South Africa and lived in Britain and Mozambique between 1979 and 1990. During this period he was attached to the Centre for African Studies at the Eduardo Mondlane University, Mozambique. During his time in exile Davies held lectures in Mozambique together with Ruth First. On his return from exile he conducted economic research for the African National Congress and the Southern African Development Community. In 1990 he became co-director of the Centre for Southern African Studies at the University of the Western Cape.

== Cabinet Minister ==
He was deputy Minister of Trade and Industry from June 2005 until May 2009 and Chairman of the Parliamentary Portfolio Committee on Finance. Davies has been a member of Parliament since 1994 and is a member of the central committee and politburo of the South African Communist Party (SACP).

He was appointed Minister of Trade and Industry by President Jacob Zuma in May 2009 and re-appointed to the position on 25 May 2014. During his first term from 2009 to 2014, he oversaw the development and implementation of annual three-year rolling Industrial Policy Action Plans as well as steering South Africa's participation in important trade relations, including the Tripartite SADC-COMESA-EAC Free Trade Area, BRICS, Economic Partnership Agreement with EU, the US Africa Growth and Opportunity Act, and World Trade Organisation Bali package.
