= Cabinet of South Africa =

Cabinet of the national government of the Republic of South Africa

- Coat of Arms of South Africa

Overview
- Established: 1910; 116 years ago
- Country: South Africa
- Leader: President
- Appointed by: Cyril Ramaphosa
- Ministries: 32
- Responsible to: President of South Africa
- Headquarters: Union Buildings, Pretoria

The Cabinet of South Africa is the most senior level of the executive branch of the Government of South Africa. It is made up of the president, the deputy president, and the ministers.

== Overview ==
The cabinet of South Africa consists of the president, deputy president, and ministers. The president appoints the deputy president and ministers, assigns the ministers’ powers and functions, and may dismiss them. The deputy president must be a member of the National Assembly.

The president may select any number of ministers. The ministers must be selected from the members of the National Assembly, with the exception that up to two ministers may be selected from outside the assembly. The deputy president and ministers may be from various political parties, reflecting the outcomes of the general election or coalition agreements. Members of the cabinet are accountable collectively and individually to Parliament for the exercise of their powers and the performance of their functions.

The president must appoint a member of the cabinet to be the leader of government business in the National Assembly.

The president appoints deputy ministers to assist the relevant ministers in the execution of their duties but they are not members of the cabinet. Deputy ministers must be selected from the members of the National Assembly. The exception is that up to two ministers may be selected from outside the assembly, but they are accountable to Parliament for the exercise of their powers and the performance of their function.

The cabinet is responsible for the general direction and administration of the government of South Africa.

The composition and responsibilities of cabinet members and deputy ministers may be reconfigured by the president as required to enhance efficiency and address the nation's priorities. This reconfiguration is part of the president's executive powers to organize the government in a way that they believe will best serve national interests.

The term of a previous president ends when the new president is sworn into office by the Chief Justice of the Republic.

A cabinet member or deputy minister's term of office begins upon their swearing-in, not upon the announcement of their appointment by the president. Their term of office ends when the new president is sworn in, including when a current president is re-inaugurated following an election.

== Current cabinet ==
President Cyril Ramaphosa announced his cabinet on 30 June 2024, sixteen days after being elected president of the 7th administration on 14 June 2024. The delay in settling the cabinet followed the ANC securing only about 40% of the vote in the May national election. When announcing the cabinet president Ramaphosa stated, "In casting their votes, the people [of South Africa] made it clear that they expect political parties to work together to deliver on a mandate of transformation, growth, and renewal. To give effect to this mandate, it was agreed that a Government of National Unity, which brings together parties from across the political spectrum, should be formed."

This Government of National Unity (GNU) was formed by the African National Congress (ANC), Democratic Alliance (DA), Patriotic Alliance (PA), Inkatha Freedom Party (IFP), Good Party (Good), Pan Africanist Congress of Azania (PAC), Freedom Front Plus (FF+), United Democratic Movement (UDM), Al Jama-ah, Rise Mzansi (Rise) and UAT, although the UAT withdrew on 12 July 2024 after it did not receive any positions in the Cabinet. The partnership between the GNU parties is guided by a Statement of Intent, which outlines fundamental principles and a minimum programme of priorities.

The following table details the distribution of Parliamentary seats, cabinet members (which include the president and deputy president), and deputy ministers among the parties currently in the GNU. The background colours in the table highlight the relative value of the numbers, with darker shades representing higher values. See below for proportions and ratios regarding these executive positions.

Distribution of Seats and Executive Positions Among GNU Parties
Party	Seats	Cabinet members	Deputy Ministers	Total
ANC	159	22	31	53
DA	87	6	5	11
IFP	17	2	2	4
PA	9	1	-	1
FF+	6	1	-	1
UDM	3	-	1	1
Rise	2	-	-	0
Aljama	2	-	1	1
PAC	1	1	-	1
Good	1	1	-	1
Total	287	34	40	74

=== The Cabinet ===
After the 2024 national and provincial election, president Cyril Ramaphosa announced the GNU cabinet and deputy ministers on 30 June 2024. The current members of the cabinet of the GNU are listed in the table below. The deputy president and initial set of ministers officially took office upon their swearing-in on 3 July 2024.

Office	Portrait	Holder and party of origin		Term started and days in office
President		Cyril Ramaphosa (born 1952)	ANC	15 February 2018: 3,193 days
Deputy President		Paul Mashatile (born 1961)	ANC	7 March 2023: 1,347 days
Minister of Agriculture		Willie Aucamp (born 1972)	DA	30 June 2026: 136 days
Minister of Basic Education		Siviwe Gwarube (born 1989)	DA	3 July 2024: 863 days
Minister of Communications and Digital Technologies		Solly Malatsi (born 1985)	DA	3 July 2024: 863 days
Minister of Cooperative Governance and Traditional Affairs		Velenkosini Hlabisa (born 1965)	IFP	3 July 2024: 863 days
Minister of Correctional Services		Pieter Groenewald (born 1955)	FF+	3 July 2024: 863 days
Minister of Defence and Military Veterans		Angie Motshekga (born 1955)	ANC	3 July 2024: 863 days
Minister of Electricity and Energy		Kgosientsho Ramokgopa (born 1974)	ANC	3 July 2024: 863 days
Minister of Employment and Labour		Nomakhosazana Meth (born 1970)	ANC	3 July 2024: 863 days
Minister of Finance		Enoch Godongwana (born 1957)	ANC	5 August 2021: 1,926 days
Minister of Forestry, Fisheries and the Environment		David Maynier (born 1968)	DA	1 July 2026: 135 days
Minister of Health		Aaron Motsoaledi (born 1958)	ANC	3 July 2024: 863 days
Minister of Higher Education		Buti Manamela (born 1979)	ANC	3 July 2024: 863 days
Minister of Home Affairs		Leon Schreiber (born 1980)	DA	3 July 2024: 863 days
Minister of Human Settlements		Thembi Simelane (born 1973)	ANC	3 December 2024: 710 days
Minister of International Relations and Cooperation		Ronald Lamola (born 1983)	ANC	3 July 2024: 863 days
Minister of Justice and Constitutional Development		Mmamoloko Kubayi (born 1978)	ANC	3 July 2024: 863 days
Minister of Land Reform and Rural Development		Mzwanele Nyhontso (born 1974)	PAC	3 July 2024: 863 days
Minister of Mineral and Petroleum Resources		Gwede Mantashe (born 1955)	ANC	3 July 2024: 863 days
Minister of Planning, Monitoring and Evaluation		Maropene Ramokgopa (born 1980)	ANC	7 March 2023: 1,347 days
Minister of Police		Senzo Mchunu (born 1958)	ANC	3 July 2024: 863 days
Minister in the Presidency		Khumbudzo Ntshavheni (born 1977)	ANC	6 March 2023: 1,348 days
Minister of Public Service and Administration		Mzamo Buthelezi (born 1960)	IFP	3 July 2024: 863 days
Minister of Public Works and Infrastructure		Dean Macpherson (born 1980)	DA	3 July 2024: 863 days
Minister of Science, Technology and Innovation		Blade Nzimande (born 1958)	ANC	3 July 2024: 863 days
Minister of Small Business Development		Stella Ndabeni-Abrahams (born 1978)	ANC	5 August 2021: 1,926 days
Minister of Social Development		Dina Pule (born 1960)	ANC	1 July 2026: 135 days
Minister of Sport, Arts and Culture		Gayton McKenzie (born 1970)	PA	3 July 2024: 863 days
Minister of Tourism		Patricia de Lille (born 1951)	GOOD	6 March 2023: 1,348 days
Minister of Trade, Industry and Competition		Parks Tau (born 1969)	ANC	3 July 2024: 863 days
Minister of Transport		Barbara Creecy (born 1958)	ANC	3 July 2024: 863 days
Minister of Water and Sanitation		Pemmy Majodina (born 1967)	ANC	3 July 2024: 863 days
Minister of Women, Youth and Persons with Disabilities		Sindisiwe Chikunga (born 1966)	ANC	3 July 2024: 863 days

=== Deputy Ministers ===
Deputy ministers are appointed by the president of South Africa. They are not members of the cabinet. They assist cabinet ministers in the execution of their duties. The current deputy ministers are listed in the table below. The original group of deputy ministers officially took office upon their swearing-in on 3 July 2024.

Department	Deputy Minister	Party	Term started & days in office
Agriculture	Rosemary Capa	ANC	3 July 2024: 863 days
Basic Education	Reginah Mhaule	ANC	3 July 2024: 863 days
Communications and Digital Technologies	Mondli Gungubele	ANC	3 July 2024: 863 days
Cooperative Governance and Traditional Affairs	Dickson Masemola	ANC	3 July 2024: 863 days
Cooperative Governance and Traditional Affairs (2nd Deputy)	Zolile Burns-Ncamashe	ANC	3 July 2024: 863 days
Defence and Military Veterans	Bantu Holomisa	UDM	3 July 2024: 863 days
Defence and Military Veterans (2nd Deputy)	Richard Mkhungo	ANC	3 July 2024: 863 days
Electricity and Energy	Alexandra Abrahams	DA	30 June 2026: 136 days
Employment and Labour	Jomo Sibiya	ANC	3 July 2024: 863 days
Employment and Labour (2nd Deputy)	Phumzile Mgcina	ANC	3 July 2024: 863 days
Finance	David Masondo	ANC	3 July 2024: 863 days
Finance (2nd Deputy)	Ashor Sarupen	DA	3 July 2024: 863 days
Forestry, Fisheries and the Environment	Narend Singh	IFP	3 July 2024: 863 days
Forestry, Fisheries and the Environment (2nd Deputy)	Bernice Swarts	ANC	3 July 2024: 863 days
Health	Joe Phaahla	ANC	3 July 2024: 863 days
Higher Education	Buti Manamela	ANC	3 July 2024: 863 days
Higher Education (2nd Deputy)	Yusuf Cassim	DA	1 July 2026: 135 days
Home Affairs	Njabulo Nzuza	ANC	3 July 2024: 863 days
Human Settlements	Tandi Mahambehlala	ANC	3 July 2024: 863 days
International Relations and Cooperation	Alvin Botes	ANC	3 July 2024: 863 days
International Relations and Cooperation (2nd Deputy)	Thandi Moraka	ANC	3 July 2024: 863 days
Justice and Constitutional Development	Andries Nel	ANC	3 July 2024: 863 days
Land Reform and Rural Development	Chupu Stanley Mathabatha	ANC	3 July 2024: 863 days
Mineral and Petroleum Resources	Judith Nemadzinga-Tshabalala	ANC	3 July 2024: 863 days
Planning, Monitoring and Evaluation	Seiso Mohai	ANC	3 July 2024: 863 days
Police	Polly Boshielo	ANC	3 July 2024: 863 days
Police (2nd Deputy)	Cassel Mathale	ANC	3 July 2024: 863 days
Public Service and Administration	Pinky Kekana	ANC	3 July 2024: 863 days
Public Works and Infrastructure	Sihle Zikalala	ANC	3 July 2024: 863 days
Science, Technology and Innovation	Nomalungelo Gina	ANC	3 July 2024: 863 days
Small Business Development	Jane Sithole	DA	3 July 2024: 863 days
Social Development	Ganief Hendricks	Al Jama-ah	3 July 2024: 863 days
Sport, Arts and Culture	Peace Mabe	ANC	3 July 2024: 863 days
Tourism	Maggie Sotyu	ANC	3 July 2024: 863 days
Trade, Industry and Competition	Zuko Godlimpi	ANC	3 July 2024: 863 days
Trade, Industry and Competition (2nd Deputy)	John Steenhuisen	DA	1 July 2026: 135 days
Transport	Mkhuleko Hlengwa	IFP	3 July 2024: 863 days
Water and Sanitation	David Mahlobo	ANC	3 July 2024: 863 days
Water and Sanitation (2nd Deputy)	Jack Bloom	DA	1 July 2026: 135 days
Women, Youth and Persons with Disabilities	Mmapaseka Steve Letsike	ANC	3 July 2024: 863 days

=== Proportions and ratios of positions as between GNU parties ===
The table below details the distribution of parliamentary seats, cabinet members, and deputy ministers among the parties of the GNU. The percentages represent the proportion of each category held by GNU parties only, excluding other parties in Parliament. The background colours in the table highlight the relative value of the numbers, with darker shades representing higher values.

Proportions of parliamentary seats and executive position between GNU parties
Party	% of Seats	% Cabinet Members	% Deputy Ministers	% Total
ANC	55.2%	64.7%	77.5%	71.6%
DA	30.2%	17.6%	12.5%	14.9%
IFP	5.9%	5.9%	5.0%	5.4%
PA	3.1%	2.9%		1.4%
FF+	2.1%	2.9%		1.4%
UDM	1.0%		2.5%	1.4%
Rise	0.7%			0.0%
Aljama	0.7%		2.5%	1.4%
PAC	0.3%	2.9%		1.4%
Good	0.3%	2.9%		1.4%

The table below illustrates the ratios of executive positions to Parliamentary seats among the parties of the GNU. The background colours in the table highlight the relative value of the numbers, with darker shades representing higher values.

Ratios of cabinet and deputy minister positions to parliamentary seats among GNU parties
Party	Ratio: Cabinet members vs Seats	Ratio: Deputy Ministers vs Seats	Ratio: Cabinet & Deputies vs seats
ANC	1.17	1.48	1.33
DA	0.58	0.44	0.51
IFP	1.00	1.00	0.47
PA	0.94	0.00	0.44
FF+	1.41	0.00	0.67
UDM	0.00	2.53	1.33
Rise	0.00	0.00	0.00
Aljama	0.00	3.79	2.00
PAC	8.47	0.00	4.00
Good	8.47	0.00	4.00

== Changes to ministerial portfolios from 2009 ==
The president may restructure cabinet at his discretion, meaning that ministerial portfolios may be changed or dissolved. Defunct ministerial portfolios include those in the table below. They are listed chronologically by the year within which they were dissolved or changed.

Portfolio	Start	End / Change	Successor Ministries
Education	1989	2009	Divided into the Basic Education and the Higher Education and Training.
Agriculture and Land Affairs	1996	2009	Divided into sections absorbed into the new Rural Development and Land Reform and into the new Agriculture, Forestry and Fisheries.
Correctional Services (formerly Ministry of Prisons)	1990	2014	Merged into the new Justice and Correctional Services.
Telecommunications and Postal Services	2014	2018	Absorbed into Communications.
Arts and Culture	2004	2019	Merged to create the Sport, Arts and Culture.
Sport and Recreation (formerly Sport)	1993	2019	Merged to create the Sport, Arts and Culture.
Rural Development and Land Reform	2009	2019	Merged into the new Agriculture, Land Reform and Rural Development.
Agriculture, Forestry and Fisheries	2009	2019	Merged into the new Agriculture, Land Reform and Rural Development and into the new Environment, Forestry and Fisheries.
Economic Development	2009	2019	Absorbed into the Trade and Industry.
Mineral Resources (formerly Mining)	2009	2019	Re-merged to create the Mineral Resources and Energy.
Energy	2009	2019	Re-merged to create the Mineral Resources and Energy.
State Security (formerly Intelligence Services)	1999	2021	Abolished and its functions transferred to the Minister in the Presidency.
Human Settlements, Water and Sanitation	2009	2021	Re-divided into the Human Settlements and the Water and Sanitation.
Agriculture, Land Reform and Rural Development	2019	2024	Re-divided into the Agriculture and the Land Reform and Rural Development.
Higher Education, Science and Technology	2019	2024	Divided into the Higher Education and the Science and Technology.
Justice and Correctional Services	2014	2024	Divided into the Justice and Constitutional Development and the Correctional Services.
Public Enterprises	1994	2024	Abolished and functions transferred to the Presidency "during the process of implementing a new shareholder model".
Mineral Resources and Energy	2019	2024	Divided into Mineral and Petroleum Resources and Electricity and Energy.

== Milestones ==
In 1989, Rina Venter became the first woman to hold a cabinet post in South African history. Following the end of apartheid and the first multi-racial elections in 1994, Nelson Mandela became the first black president of South Africa and appointed a Government of National Unity consisting of African National Congress, National Party, and Inkatha Freedom Party members. In 1996, the National Party withdrew from the GNU and the cabinet's composition has been dominated by ANC members since then. The Inkatha Freedom Party continued to hold seats in the government, as minority partners, until the elections of 2004. In 2014, Lynne Brown became the first openly LGBT person to serve as a cabinet minister in South Africa and Africa.

In 2019, president Cyril Ramaphosa appointed the first gender-balanced cabinet in South African history.

== Pre-1994 history ==
On 31 May 1910, former Boer military general and the former prime minister of the Transvaal Colony Louis Botha became the first prime minister of the newly established Union of South Africa—the forerunner of the modern South African state. He appointed the first cabinet of the Union of South Africa after the general election held on 15 September 1910. It consisted of members of the now-defunct South African Party. For the next fourteen years, it only consisted of members of the SAP. Botha died in 1919 and was replaced with another Boer general and SAP member, Jan Smuts.

In 1924, J. B. M. Hertzog of the National Party became prime minister through a coalition with the Labour Party and appointed a cabinet that consisted of National Party and Labour Party members. In 1934, the Hertzog's National Party and the South African Party merged to form the United Party. Hertzog won the 1938 general election, but in 1939 the United Party was divided between supporters of Hertzog and those of his Justice Minister Jan Smuts because of the question of South Africa's role in the Second World War. Hertzog was voted out in the United Party and resigned as prime minister, which allowed Jan Smuts to form a government in coalition with the Dominion Party and the Labour Party. The 1948 general election was won outright by D. F. Malan's Herenigde Nasionale Party and Malan appointed his first cabinet composed of National Party members. For the next forty-six years, South Africa would be governed by the National Party.

On 31 May 1961, South Africa became a republic and Queen Elizabeth II was replaced as head of state with a state president with largely ceremonial powers. The Prime Minister was still head of government and appointed/dismissed members of the cabinet. In 1984, the constitution was amended and the office of prime minister was abolished while the office of state president was given more responsibilities. State president P. W. Botha was now the head of state and head of government. In the 1984 tricameral parliamentary elections, Allan Hendrickse's Labour Party won a majority of seats in the coloured House of Representatives, while Amichand Rajbansi's National People's Party won a plurality of seats in the Indian House of Delegates. Hendrickse and Rajbansi were appointed to serve in Botha's second cabinet as Minister of Coloureds' Affairs and Minister of Indian Affairs, respectively, becoming the first non-white members of the South African cabinet.

== Lists of cabinets since 1910 ==
- First Cabinet of Louis Botha, 1910–1915
- Second Cabet of Louis Botha, 1915–1919
- First Cabinet of Jan Smuts, 1920–1921
- Second Cabinet of Jan Smuts, 1921–1924
- First Cabinet of J.B.M Hertzog, 1924–1929
- Second Cabinet of J.B.M Hertzog, 1929–1933
- Third Cabinet of J.B.M Hertzog, 1933–1938
- Fourth Cabinet of J.B.M Hertzog, 1938–1943
- Third Cabinet of Jan Smuts, 1943–1948
- First Cabinet of D.F. Malan, 1948–1953
- Second Cabinet of D.F. Malan, 1953–1958
- Cabinet of Hans Strydom, 1958–1961
- First Cabinet of Hendrik Verwoerd, 1961–1966
- Second Cabinet of Hendrik Verwoerd, 1966
- First Cabinet of B.J. Vorster, 1966–1970
- Second Cabinet of B.J. Vorster, 1970–1974
- Third Cabinet of B.J. Vorster, 1974–1978
- First Cabinet of P.W. Botha, 1981–1984
- Second Cabinet of P.W. Botha, 1984–1989
- Cabinet of F.W. de Klerk, 1989–1994
- Cabinet of Nelson Mandela, 1994–1999
- First Cabinet of Thabo Mbeki, 1999–2004
- Second Cabinet of Thabo Mbeki, 2004–2008
- Cabinet of Kgalema Motlanthe, 2008–2009
- First Cabinet of Jacob Zuma, 2009–2014
- Second Cabinet of Jacob Zuma, 2014–2018
- First Cabinet of Cyril Ramaphosa, 2018–2019
- Second Cabinet of Cyril Ramaphosa, 2019–2024
- Third Cabinet of Cyril Ramaphosa, 2024–
