= Second cabinet of Louis Botha =

Second Botha Cabinet
- 2nd Cabinet of the Union of South Africa (since the 1909 South Africa Act)
- 1915–1920
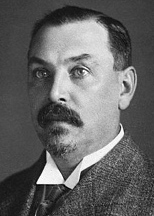
- Louis Botha (c. 1919)
- Date formed: 20 October 1915
- Date dissolved: 20 March 1920 (4 years and 5 months)

People and organisations
- Monarch: King George V
- Governor-General: Viscount Buxton
- Prime Minister: Louis Botha (died 1919); Jan Smuts
- Member parties: South African Party
- Status in legislature: Majority
- Opposition parties: Unionist Party
- Opposition leaders: Thomas Smartt

History
- Election: 1915 election
- Predecessor: Botha I
- Successor: Smuts I

== Cabinet ==
Post	Minister	Term		Party
Prime Minister	Gen. Jan Smuts	1919	–	SAP
Prime Minister	Gen. Louis Botha	1910	1919	SAP
Minister of Agriculture	The Hon. H. C. van Heerden MP	1913	1920	SAP
Minister of Defence	The Hon. Hendrik Mentz MP	1919	–	SAP
Minister of Defence	The Hon. Jan Smuts MP	1912	1919	SAP
Minister of Education	The Hon. F. S. Malan MP	1910	–	SAP
Minister of Finance	The Hon. Thomas Orr MP	1917	1920	SAP
Minister of Finance	The Hon. Henry Burton MP	1915	1917	SAP
Minister of Public Health (newly formed)	The Hon. Thomas Watt MP	1919	–	SAP
Minister of Interior Affairs	The Hon. Thomas Watt MP	1919	–	SAP
Minister of Interior Affairs	Gen. Jan Smuts	1913	1919	SAP
Minister of Justice	The Hon. Nicolaas de Wet MP	1913	–	SAP
Minister of Lands and Irrigation	The Hon. Hendrik Mentz MP	1915	–	SAP
Minister of Mines and Industry	The Hon. F. S. Malan MP	1912	–	SAP
Minister of Native Affairs	Gen. Jan Smuts	1919	–	SAP
Minister of Native Affairs	Gen. Louis Botha	1912	1919	SAP
Minister of Posts and Telegraphs	The Hon. Thomas Orr MP	1919	1920	SAP
Minister of Posts and Telegraphs	The Hon. J. H. M. Beck MP	1915	1919	SAP
Minister of Public Works	The Hon. Thomas Watt MP	1912	1920	SAP
Minister of Railways and Harbours	The Hon. Henry Burton MP	1912	–	SAP

== Sources ==
- "Geocities – South Africa". Geocities (Web Archive). Archived from the original on 16 October 2007.
