= Second Jan Smuts government =

Appointments to former South African governing council

Second Smuts ministry
- 4th Cabinet of the Union of South Africa
- Date formed: 5 September 1939
- Date dissolved: 1948

People and organisations
- Head of state: George VI
- Head of government: Jan Smuts
- Member party: United Party; Dominion Party; Labour Party
- Opposition party: Purified National Party (1939–1940); Herenigde Nasionale Party (1940–1948)
- Opposition leader: Daniel François Malan (1939–1940); J. B. M. Hertzog (1940); Daniel François Malan (1940–1948)

History
- Election: 1943
- Predecessor: J. B. M. Hertzog government
- Successor: Daniel François Malan government

Jan Smuts became South African Prime Minister for the second time in 1939, following a split in the United Party. He appointed members of the United Party, Dominion Party and Labour Party to positions in his Cabinet.

== Ministers ==
=== First Smuts Cabinet ===
The 1938 general election was won by the United Party, giving J. B. M. Hertzog a fourth consecutive term. In September 1939, the United Party was divided between supporters of Hertzog and those of his Justice Minister Jan Smuts. The split resulted from differences between supporters of neutrality in World War II and those who wanted South Africa to follow the United Kingdom and declare war against Nazi Germany. Finally, Hertzog was outvoted within the United Party and Parliament. He resigned his post as prime minister, allowing Jan Smuts to form a new government in coalition with the Dominion Party and Labour Party.

Party key	United Party
Party key	Dominion Party
Party key	Labour Party

Office	Name	Dates
Prime Minister	Jan Smuts	5 September 1939 – 7 July 1943
Minister of Defence	Jan Smuts	5 September 1939 – 7 July 1943
Minister of Foreign Affairs	Jan Smuts	5 September 1939 – 7 July 1943
Minister of Agriculture and Forestry	William Richard Collins	5 September 1939 – 7 July 1943
Minister of Commerce and Industry	Richard Stuttaford	5 September 1939 – 1941
Minister of Commerce and Industry	Sidney Frank Waterson	1941 – 7 July 1943
Minister of Education	Jan Hendrik Hofmeyr	5 September 1939 – 7 July 1943
Minister of Finance	Jan Hendrik Hofmeyr	5 September 1939 – 7 July 1943
Minister of the Interior	Harry Lawrence	5 September 1939 – 7 July 1943
Minister of Public Health	Harry Lawrence	5 September 1939 – 7 July 1943
Minister of Justice	Colin Fraser Steyn	5 September 1939 – 7 July 1943
Minister of Labour	Walter Bayley Madeley	5 September 1939 – 7 July 1943
Minister of Social Affairs	Walter Bayley Madeley	5 September 1939 – 7 July 1943
Minister of Lands	Andrew Meintjes Conroy	5 September 1939 – 7 July 1943
Minister of Mines	Charles Stallard	5 September 1939 – 7 July 1943
Minister of Native Affairs	Deneys Reitz	5 September 1939 – 7 July 1943
Minister of Posts and Telegraphs	Charles Francis Clarkson	5 September 1939 – 7 July 1943
Minister of Railways and Harbours	Frederick Claud Sturrock	5 September 1939 – 7 July 1943
Minister without portfolio	Pieter Voltelyn Graham van der Byl	5 September 1939 – 7 July 1943

== See also ==
- Prime Minister of South Africa
