= First cabinet of Louis Botha =

First Botha Cabinet
- 1st Cabinet of the Union of South Africa (since the 1909 South Africa Act)
- 1910–1915
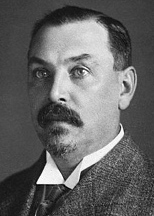
- Louis Botha (c. 1919)
- Date formed: 15 September 1910
- Date dissolved: 20 October 1915 (5 years, 1 month and 5 days)

People and organisations
- Monarch: King George V
- Governor-General: Viscount Gladstone (until 1914); Viscount Buxton
- Prime Minister: Louis Botha
- Member parties: South African Party
- Status in legislature: Majority
- Opposition parties: Unionist Party
- Opposition leaders: Leander Starr Jameson

History
- Election: 1910 election
- Successor: Botha II

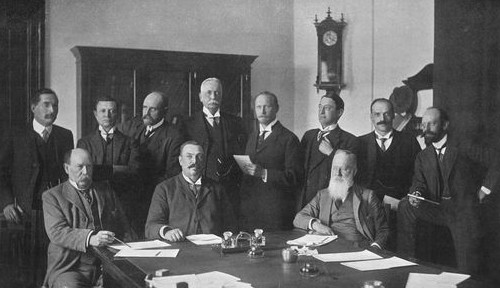
(c.1910) Front (left to right): J. W. Sauer, Louis Botha, and Abraham Fischer. Back (left to right): J. B. M. Hertzog, Henry Burton, F. R. Moor, C. O'Grady Gubbins, Jan Smuts, H. C. Hull, F. S. Malan, and David Graaff.

The Louis Botha government appointed the members of the government in South Africa led by Prime Minister Louis Botha between 31 May 1910 and 3 September 1919.

The former Boer general Louis Botha, Prime Minister of Transvaal was appointed by the British crown to become the first Prime Minister of the Union of South Africa during its formation on 31 May 1910. The first national general elections were held on 15 September 1910 and ended in the victory of the coalition led by the "Het Volk" party led by Louis Botha (67 seats) against the 37 seats won by the Unionists of Leander Starr Jameson. The remaining 26 seats were won by small parties.

The Botha coalition, made up of Anglo-Afrikaner parties, became the South African Party. In Elections of October 1915, the South African Party won 54 seats against 40 for Unionists 27 seats in the National Party, 4 seats to the Labour Party of South Africa and six seats distributed among small groups.

== Cabinet ==
Post	Minister	Term		Party
Prime Minister	Gen. Louis Botha	1910	1915	SAP
Minister of Agriculture	The Hon. H. C. van Heerden MP	1913	1915	SAP
Minister of Agriculture	Gen. Louis Botha	1912	1913	SAP
Minister of Agriculture	The Hon. J. W. Sauer MP	1912	1912	SAP
Minister of Agriculture	Gen. Louis Botha	1910	1912	SAP
Minister of Commerce and Industry (merged with Department of Mines in 1912)	The Hon. George Leuchars MP	1911	1912	SAP
Minister of Commerce and Industry (merged with Department of Mines in 1912)	The Hon. F. R. Moore MP	1910	1911	SAP
Minister of Defence (newly formed)	Gen. Jan Smuts	1912	1915	SAP
Minister of Education	The Hon. F. S. Malan MP	1910	1915	SAP
Minister of Finance	Gen. Jan Smuts	1912	1915	SAP
Minister of Finance	The Hon. Henry Charles Hull MP	1910	1912	SAP
Minister of Interior Affairs	Gen. Jan Smuts	1913	1915	SAP
Minister of Interior Affairs	The Hon. Abraham Fischer MP	1912	1913	SAP
Minister of Interior Affairs	Gen. Jan Smuts	1910	1912	SAP
Minister of Justice	The Hon. Nicolaas de Wet MP	1913	1915	SAP
Minister of Justice	The Hon. J. W. Sauer MP	1912	1913	SAP
Minister of Justice	The Hon. Barry Hertzog MP	1910	1912	SAP
Minister of Lands and Irrigation	The Hon. Hendrik Schalk Theron MP	1913	1915	SAP
Minister of Lands and Irrigation	The Hon. Abraham Fischer MP	1910	1913	SAP
Minister of Mines and Industry	The Hon. F. S. Malan MP	1912	1915	SAP
Minister of Mines and Industry	Gen. Jan Smuts	1910	1912	SAP
Minister of Native Affairs	Gen. Louis Botha	1913	1915	SAP
Minister of Native Affairs	The Hon. J. W. Sauer MP	1912	1913	SAP
Minister of Native Affairs	The Hon. Barry Hertzog MP	1912	1912	SAP
Minister of Native Affairs	The Hon. Henry Burton MP	1910	1912	SAP
Minister of Posts and Telegraphs	The Hon. Thomas Watt MP	1912	1915	SAP
Minister of Posts and Telegraphs	The Hon. George Leuchars MP	1912	1912	SAP
Minister of Posts and Telegraphs	The Hon. D. P. de Villiers Graaf MP	1910	1912	SAP
Minister of Public Works	The Hon. Thomas Watt MP	1912	1915	SAP
Minister of Public Works	The Hon. D. P. de Villiers Graaf MP	1910	1912	SAP
Minister of Railways and Harbours	The Hon. Henry Burton MP	1912	1915	SAP
Minister of Railways and Harbours	The Hon. J. W. Sauer MP	1910	1912	SAP

== Sources ==
- "Geocities – South Africa". Geocities (Web Archive). Archived from the original on 16 October 2007.
