= Second cabinet of Jan Smuts =

Second Smuts Cabinet
- 4th Cabinet of the Union of South Africa (since the 1909 South Africa Act)
- 1921–1924
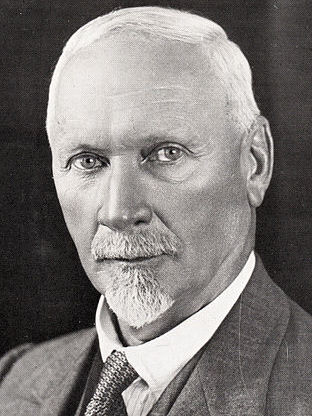
- Jan Smuts (c. 1934)
- Date formed: 8 February 1921
- Date dissolved: 19 June 1924 (3 years, 4 months and 11 days)

People and organisations
- Monarch: King George V
- Governor-General: Prince Arthur (until 1924); Earl of Athlone
- Prime Minister: Jan Smuts
- Member parties: South African Party
- Status in legislature: Majority
- Opposition parties: National Party
- Opposition leaders: Barry Hertzog

History
- Election: 1921 election
- Predecessor: Smuts I
- Successor: Hertzog I

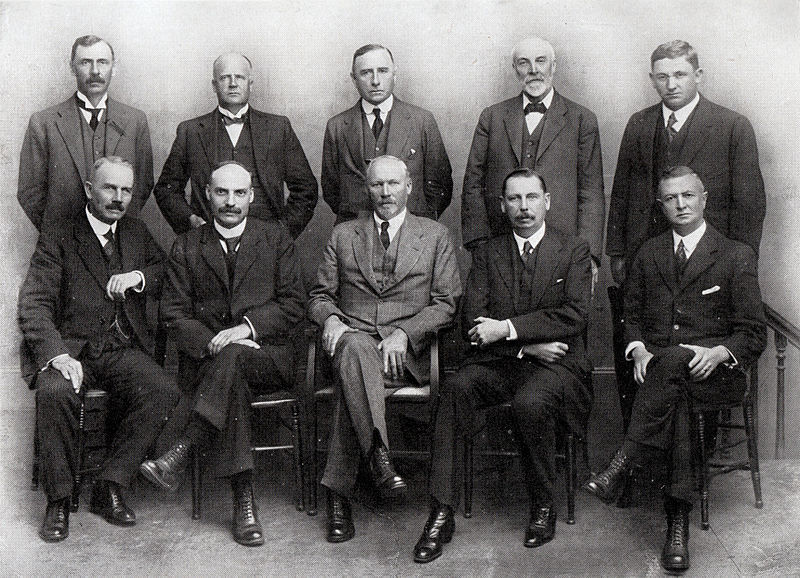
(c.1923) Front (left to right): Thomas Watt, F. S. Malan, Jan Smuts, Thomas Smartt, and Henry Burton. Back (left to right): Nicolaas de Wet, Deneys Reitz, Patrick Duncan, John William Jagger, and Hendrik Mentz.

== Cabinet ==
Post	Minister	Term		Party
Prime Minister	Gen. Jan Smuts	1919	1924	SAP
Minister of Agriculture	The Hon. Sir Thomas Smartt MP	1921	1924	SAP
Minister of Defence	The Hon. Hendrik Mentz MP	1919	1924	SAP
Minister of Education	The Hon. Patrick Duncan MP	1921	1924	SAP
Minister of Finance	The Hon. Henry Burton MP	1920	1924	SAP
Minister of Public Health	The Hon. Patrick Duncan MP	1921	1924	SAP
Minister of Interior Affairs	The Hon. Patrick Duncan MP	1921	1924	SAP
Minister of Justice	The Hon. Nicolaas de Wet MP	1913	1924	SAP
Minister of Lands and Irrigation	The Hon. Deneys Reitz MP	1921	1924	SAP
Minister of Mines and Industry	The Hon. F. S. Malan MP	1912	1924	SAP
Minister of Native Affairs	Gen. Jan Smuts	1919	1924	SAP
Minister of Posts and Telegraphs	The Hon. Thomas Watt MP	1921	1924	SAP
Minister of Public Works	The Hon. Thomas Watt MP	1921	1924	SAP
Minister of Railways and Harbours	The Hon. John W. Jagger MP	1921	1924	SAP

== Sources ==
- "Geocities – South Africa". Geocities (Web Archive). Archived from the original on 16 October 2007.
