= J. B. M. Hertzog government =

Hertzog ministry
- 3rd Cabinet of the Union of South Africa
- Date formed: 30 June 1924

People and organisations
- Head of state: George V Edward VIII; George VI
- Head of government: J. B. M. Hertzog
- Member party: National Party
- Opposition party: South African Party (1924–1933); Purified National Party (1934–1939)
- Opposition leader: Jan Smuts (1924–1933); Daniel François Malan (1934–1939)

History
- Elections: 1924; 1929; 1933; 1938
- Predecessor: First Jan Smuts government
- Successor: Second Jan Smuts government

J. B. M. Hertzog became the Prime Minister of South Africa on 30 June 1924, replacing Jan Smuts. Hertzog led four cabinets, serving until 5 September 1939.

== Ministers ==
=== First Hertzog Cabinet ===
The general election of 1924 led to the first political transition since the formation of the Union of South Africa in 1910. The training that J. B. M. Hertzog between 1924 and 1929 government was a coalition between the National Party (NP) and the Labour Party (LP).

Office	Name	Dates
Prime Minister and Minister of Native Affairs	J. B. M. Hertzog	30 June 1924 – 14 June 1929
Minister of Foreign Affairs	J. B. M. Hertzog	1927 – 14 June 1929
Minister of Agriculture	Jan Kemp	30 June 1924 – 14 June 1929
Minister of Defence	Frederic Creswell	30 June 1924 – 14 June 1929
Minister of Finance	Nicolaas Havenga	30 June 1924 – 14 June 1929
Minister of Justice	Tielman Roos	30 June 1924 – 14 June 1929
Minister of the Interior; Minister of Education; Minister of Public Health	Daniel François Malan	30 June 1924 – 14 June 1929
Minister of Irrigation	Ernest George Jansen	1928 – 14 June 1929
Minister of Lands	Peter Grobler	30 June 1924 – 14 June 1929
Minister of Labour	Frederic Creswell	30 June 1924 – 1925
Minister of Labour	Thomas Boydell	1925 – 14 June 1929
Minister of Mines and Industry	Frederick William Beyers	30 June 1924 – 14 June 1929
Minister of Railways and Harbors	Charles Wynand Malan	30 June 1924 – 14 June 1929
Minister of Public Works	Thomas Boydell; Walter Madeley; Henry William Sampson	1924–25; 1925–28; 1928–29
Minister of Posts and Telegraphs	Thomas Boydell; Walter Madeley; Henry William Sampson	1924–25; 1925–28; 1928–29

=== Second Hertzog Cabinet ===
The 1929 general election was won by the National Party (41% of votes) due to its absolute majority in seats (78) facing the South African Party who had received 47% of the vote, but only 61 representatives. Although the National Party had a majority government, Hertzog renewed the electoral alliance with the Labour Party (8 elected), Frederic Creswell

Office	Name	Dates
Prime Minister and Minister of Foreign Affairs	J. B. M. Hertzog	14 June 1929 – 17 May 1933
Minister of the Interior; Minister of Education; Minister of Public Health	Daniel François Malan	30 June 1924 – 14 June 1929

- Ernest George Jansen, Ministers of Native Affairs and Irrigation
- Nicolaas Havenga, Minister of Finance
- Oswald Pirow, Minister of Justice
- Frederic Creswell, LP, Minister of Defence, Minister of Labour
- Minister of Railways and Harbors Charles Wynand Malan
- Minister of Lands Peter Grobler
- Minister of Agriculture Jan Kemp
- Minister of Mines and Industry Adriaan Fourie
- Minister of Public Works and Posts and Telegraphs Henry William Sampson LP

== See also ==
- Prime Minister of South Africa
