= Minister of Agriculture (South Africa) =

Minister in the Cabinet of South Africa

- Flag of South Africa

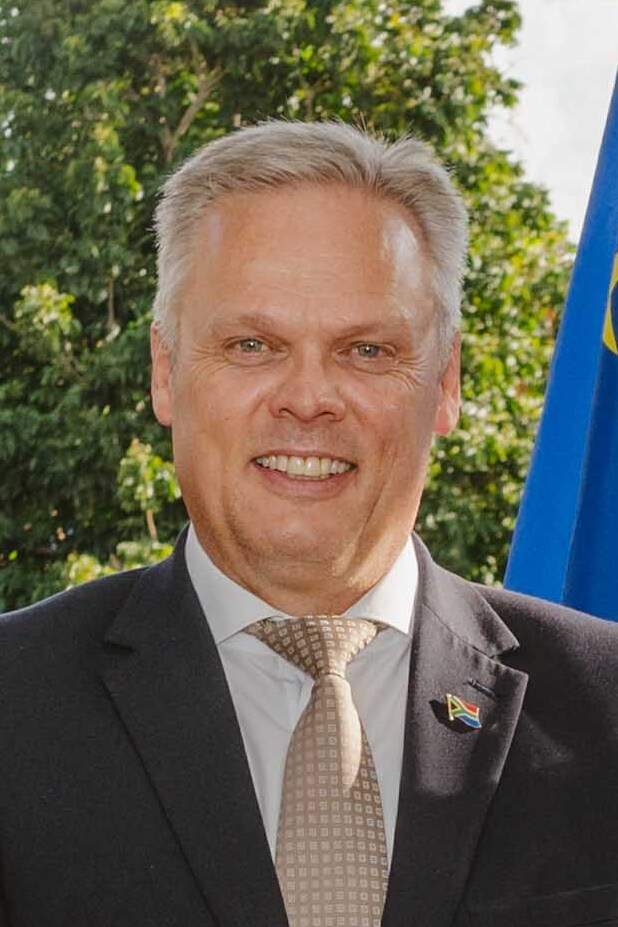
- Incumbent; Willie Aucamp since 30 June 2026
- Department of Agriculture
- Style: The Honourable
- Appointer: Cyril Ramaphosa
- Inaugural holder: Louis Botha
- Formation: June 30, 2024; 2 years ago
- Deputy: Rosemary Capa

The minister of agriculture is a minister in the Cabinet of South Africa since 2024, when the corresponding department was split from the Department of Agriculture, Forestry and Fisheries. It holds the political executive responsibility for the Department of Agriculture, and for the Agricultural Research Council, the National Agricultural Marketing Council, Onderstepoort Biological Products, the Perishable Products Export Control Board, and Ncera Farms.

The agriculture portfolio was created in the 2024 cabinet reorganisation after the re-election of President Cyril Ramaphosa as part of the government of national unity. The current minister of agriculture is Willie Aucamp, who was appointed on 30 June 2026.

== List of ministers ==
In the past, several other ministerial posts and portfolios included, or were exclusively responsible for, agriculture. The following is a historical list of these posts' official titles and their corresponding office holders.

=== Agriculture, 1910-1933 ===
Name	Portrait	Term		Party	Prime Minister
Louis Botha		31 May 1910	28 June 1912	SAP	Louis Botha (I) (II)
J.W. Sauer		28 June 1912	24 July 1913	SAP	Louis Botha (I) (II)
Louis Botha		1913	1913	SAP	Louis Botha (I) (II)
H.C. van Heerden		1913	20 March 1920	SAP	Louis Botha (I) (II)
F.S. Malan		20 March 1920	8 February 1921	SAP	Jan Smuts (I) (II)
Deneys Reitz		8 February 1921	19 June 1924	SAP	Jan Smuts (I) (II)
Jan Kemp		19 June 1924	17 May 1933	NP	J.B.M. Hertzog (I) (II)

=== Agriculture and forestry, 1933-1948 ===
Name	Portrait	Term		Party	Prime Minister
Jan Kemp		1934	1935	UP	J.B.M. Hertzog (III) (IV)
Deneys Reitz		1935	18 May 1938	UP	J.B.M. Hertzog (III) (IV)
W.R. Collins		18 May 1938	17 July 1943	UP	J.B.M. Hertzog (III) (IV)
W.R. Collins		18 May 1938	17 July 1943	UP	Jan Smuts (takes office after Hertzog resignation)
J.G.N. Strauss		17 July 1943	26 May 1948	UP	Jan Smuts (III)

=== Agriculture, 1948-1958 ===
Name	Portrait	Term		Party	Prime Minister
S.P. le Roux		26 May 1948	16 April 1958	HNP	D.F. Malan (I) (II)

=== Water affairs and agricultural technical services, 1958-1966 ===
Name	Portrait	Term		Party	Prime Minister
P.K. le Roux		16 April 1958	30 March 1966	NP	Strydom (I)
P.K. le Roux		16 April 1958	30 March 1966	NP	Hendrik Verwoerd (takes office after Strydom's death)

=== Agriculture and water affairs, 1966-1968 ===
Name	Portrait	Term		Party	Prime Minister
J.J. Fouché		30 March 1966	10 April 1968	NP	Hendrik Verwoerd (II)
J.J. Fouché		30 March 1966	10 April 1968	NP	B.J. Vorster (takes office after Verwoerd's death)

=== Agriculture, 1968-1981 ===
Name	Portrait	Term		Party	Prime Minister
D.C.H. Uys		10 April 1968	1972	NP	B.J. Vorster (I) (II) (III)
Hendrik Schoeman		1972	29 April 1981	NP	B.J. Vorster (I) (II) (III)

=== Agriculture and fisheries, 1981-1982 ===
Name	Portrait	Term		Party	Prime Minister
Pietie du Plessis		29 April 1981	1982	NP	P.W. Botha (I)

=== Agriculture, 1982-1991 ===
Name	Portrait	Term		Party	President (since 1984)
J.J.G. Wentzel		1982	6 September 1989	NP	P.W. Botha (I) (II)
Jacob de Villiers		6 September 1989	1991	NP	F.W. de Klerk (I)

=== Agriculture and development, 1991-1994 ===
Name	Portrait	Term		Party	President
Kraai van Niekerk		1991	10 May 1994	NP	F.W. de Klerk (I)

=== Agriculture, 1994-1996 ===
Name	Portrait	Term		Party	President
Kraai van Niekerk		10 May 1994	1996	NP	Nelson Mandela (Government of National Unity)

=== Agriculture and land affairs, 1996-2009 ===
Name	Portrait	Term		Party	President
Derek Hanekom		1996	14 June 1999	ANC	Nelson Mandela (Government of National Unity)
Thoko Didiza		14 June 1999	22 May 2006	ANC	Thabo Mbeki (I) (II)
Lulama Xingwana		22 May 2006	9 May 2009	ANC	Thabo Mbeki (I) (II)
Lulama Xingwana		22 May 2006	9 May 2009	ANC	Kgalema Motlanthe (takes office after Mbeki resigns)

=== Agriculture, forestry and fisheries, 2009-2019 ===
Name	Portrait	Term		Party	President
Tina Joemat-Peterson		9 May 2009	24 May 2014	ANC	Jacob Zuma (I) (II)
Senzeni Zokwana		24 May 2014	29 May 2019	ANC	Jacob Zuma (I) (II)
Senzeni Zokwana		24 May 2014	29 May 2019	ANC	Cyril Ramaphosa (Feb 2018–)

=== Agriculture, land reform and rural development, 2019-2024 ===
Name	Portrait	Term		Party	President
Thoko Didiza		29 May 2019	13 June 2024	ANC	Cyril Ramaphosa

=== Agriculture, 2024-present ===
Name	Portrait	Term		Party	President
John Steenhuisen		3 July 2024	30 June 2026	DA	Cyril Ramaphosa
Willie Aucamp		30 June 2026	Incumbent	DA	Cyril Ramaphosa
