= Third cabinet of Jan Smuts =

Third Smuts Cabinet
- 10th Cabinet of the Union of South Africa (since the 1909 South Africa Act)
- 1943–1948
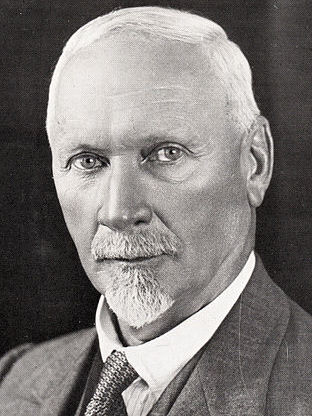
- Jan Smuts (c. 1934)
- Date formed: 17 July 1943
- Date dissolved: 26 May 1948 (4 years, 10 months and 9 days)

People and organisations
- Monarch: King George VI
- Governor-General: Sir Patrick Duncan (July 1943); Gideon van Zyl
- Prime Minister: Jan Smuts
- Member parties: United Party
- Status in legislature: Majority
- Opposition parties: Reunited National Party
- Opposition leaders: Daniël Malan

History
- Election: 1943 election
- Predecessor: Hertzog IV
- Successor: Malan I

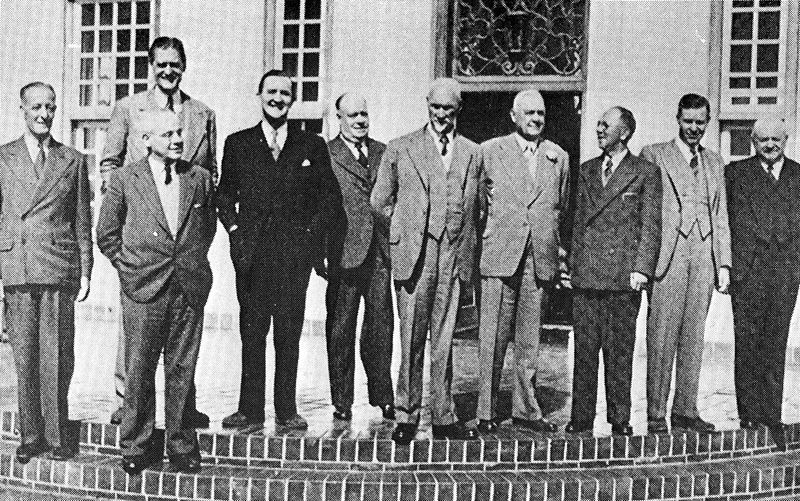
(c.1948) From left to right: S. F. Waterson, Jannie Hofmeyr (front), Pieter van der Byl (back), H. G. Lawrence, J. W. Mushet, Jan Smuts, A. G. F. Clarkson, H. Gluckman, J. G. N. Strauss, and Colin Steyn.

== Cabinet ==
Post	Minister	Term		Party
Prime Minister	Gen. Jan Smuts	1939	1948	UP
Minister of Defence	Gen. Jan Smuts	1939	1948	UP
Minister of External Affairs	Gen. Jan Smuts	1939	1948	UP
Deputy Prime Minister	The Hon. J. F. H. Hofmeyr MP	1943	1948	UP
Minister of Agriculture and Forestry	The Hon. J. G. N. Strauss MP	1944	1948	UP
Minister of Agriculture and Forestry	The Hon. W. R. Collins MP	1938	1944	UP
Minister of Economic Development (renamed in 1944)	The Hon. Sidney Waterson MP	1941	1948	UP
Minister of Education	The Hon. J. F. H. Hofmeyr MP	1939	1948	UP
Minister of Finance	The Hon. J. F. H. Hofmeyr MP	1939	1948	UP
Minister of Interior Affairs	The Hon. C. F. Clarkson MP	1943	1948	UP
Minister of Justice	The Hon. Harry Lawrence MP	1945	1948	UP
Minister of Justice	The Hon. C. F. Steyn MP	1939	1945	UP
Minister of Labour	The Hon. C. F. Steyn MP	1945	1948	UP
Minister of Labour	The Hon. Walter Madeley MP	1939	1945	Labour
Minister of Lands and Irrigation	The Hon. A. M. Conroy MP	1939	1948	UP
Minister of Mines	The Hon. C. F. Stallard MP	1939	1945	Dominion
Minister of Native Affairs	The Hon. P. V. G. van der Byl MP	1943	1948	UP
Minister of Posts and Telegraphs	The Hon. C. F. Clarkson MP	1933	1945	UP
Minister of Public Works	The Hon. C. F. Clarkson MP	1933	1945	UP
Minister of Transport (renamed in 1944)	The Hon. F. C. Sturrock MP	1939	1948	UP
Minister of Welfare and Demobilisation (merger of Social Welfare and Public Health in 1944)	The Hon. Harry Lawrence MP	1939	1948	UP

== Sources ==
- "Geocities – South Africa". Geocities (Web Archive). Archived from the original on 16 October 2007.
