= First cabinet of Jan Smuts =

First Smuts Cabinet
- 3rd Cabinet of the Union of South Africa (since the 1909 South Africa Act)
- 1920–1921
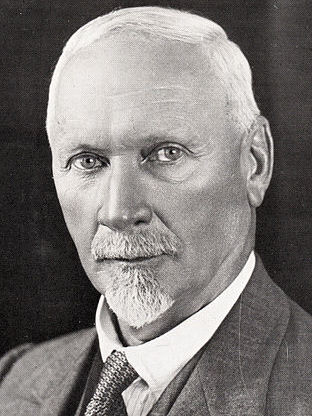
- Jan Smuts (c. 1934)
- Date formed: 20 March 1920
- Date dissolved: 8 February 1921 (10 months and 19 days)

People and organisations
- Monarch: King George V
- Governor-General: Viscount Buxton (until 1920); Prince Arthur
- Prime Minister: Jan Smuts
- Member parties: South African Party
- Status in legislature: Majority
- Opposition parties: National Party
- Opposition leaders: Barry Hertzog

History
- Election: 1920 election
- Predecessor: Botha II
- Successor: Smuts II

Gen. Jan Smuts became Prime Minister, after Louis Botha's death in September 1919. In the general election of 1920, with 134 seats elected to the lower house, the South African Party led by Jan Smuts was ahead by three seats against the National Party (44 seats). Both parties then found themselves forced to form alliances with third parties (unionists and labour) to form the new government. The South African Party was quick to form an alliance with the pro-British Unionist Party (25 seats) and Jan Smuts was reappointed prime minister. Shortly after in the same year, the Unionists agreed to join the South African Party and early general elections were held in February 1921.

== Cabinet ==
Post	Minister	Term		Party
Prime Minister	Gen. Jan Smuts	1919	–	SAP
Minister of Native Affairs	Gen. Jan Smuts	1919	–	SAP
Minister of Agriculture	The Hon. F. S. Malan MP	1920	1921	SAP
Minister of Defence	The Hon. Hendrik Mentz MP	1919	–	SAP
Minister of Education	The Hon. F. S. Malan MP	1910	1921	SAP
Minister of Finance	The Hon. Henry Burton MP	1920	–	SAP
Minister of Public Health	The Hon. Thomas Watt MP	1919	1921	SAP
Minister of Interior Affairs	The Hon. Thomas Watt MP	1919	1921	SAP
Minister of Justice	The Hon. Nicolaas de Wet MP	1913	–	SAP
Minister of Lands and Irrigation	The Hon. Hendrik Mentz MP	1916	1921	SAP
Minister of Mines and Industry	The Hon. F. S. Malan MP	1912	–	SAP
Minister of Posts and Telegraphs	The Hon. Jacobus Graaff MP	1920	1921	SAP
Minister of Public Works	The Hon. Jacobus Graaff MP	1920	1921	SAP
Minister of Railways and Harbours	The Hon. Henry Burton MP	1912	1921	SAP

== Sources ==
- "Geocities – South Africa". Geocities (Web Archive). Archived from the original on 16 October 2007.
