= Fourth cabinet of J. B. M. Hertzog =

Fourth Hertzog Cabinet
- 8th Cabinet of the Union of South Africa (since the 1909 South Africa Act)
- 1938–1943
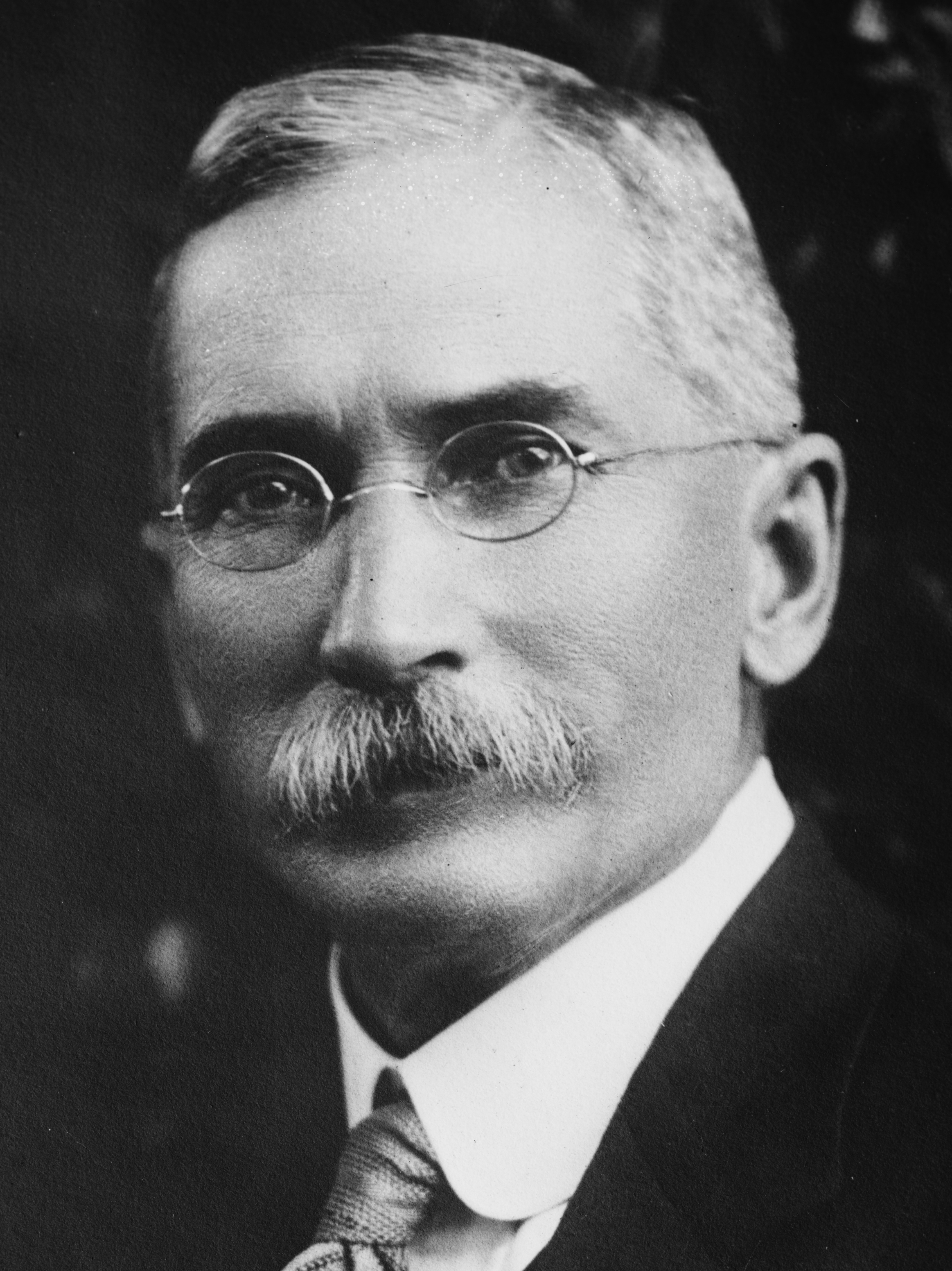
- Barry Hertzog (c. 1920)
- Date formed: 18 May 1938
- Date dissolved: 17 July 1943 (5 years, 1 month and 29 days)

People and organisations
- Monarch: King George VI
- Governor-General: Sir Patrick Duncan
- Prime Minister: Barry Hertzog (until 1939); Jan Smuts
- Member parties: United Party; Dominion Party; Labour Party
- Status in legislature: Majority (until 1939); Coalition (wartime)
- Opposition parties: Purified National Party
- Opposition leaders: Daniël Malan

History
- Election: 1938 election
- Predecessor: Hertzog III
- Successor: Smuts III

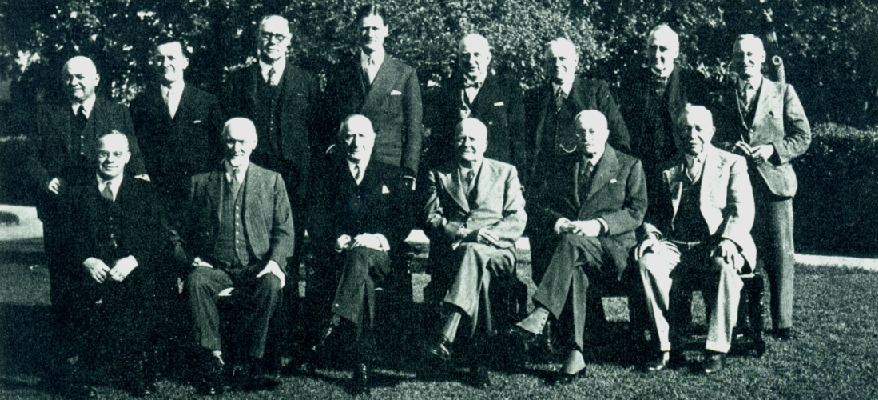
(c.1939) Front (left to right): J. H. Hofmeyr, Jan Smuts, Patrick Duncan, D. Reitz, R. Stuttaford, and W. R. Collins. Back (left to right): Colin Steyn, H. C. Lawrence, A. M. Conroy, P. van der Byl, C. F. Sturrock, C. F. Clarkson, C. F. Stallard, and W. B. Madeley.

== Cabinet ==
Post	Minister	Term		Party
Prime Minister	Gen. Barry Hertzog	1938	1939	UP
Minister of External Affairs	Gen. Barry Hertzog	1938	1939	UP
Deputy Prime Minister	Gen. Jan Smuts	1938	1939	UP
Minister of Justice	Gen. Jan Smuts	1938	1939	UP
Minister of Agriculture and Forestry	The Hon. W. R. Collins MP	1938	–	UP
Minister of Commerce and Industry	The Hon. Oswald Pirow MP	1938	1939	UP
Minister of Defence	The Hon. Oswald Pirow MP	1938	1939	UP
Minister of Education	The Hon. Henry Fagan MP	1938	1939	UP
Minister of Native Affairs	The Hon. Henry Fagan MP	1938	1939	UP
Minister of Social Welfare	The Hon. Henry Fagan MP	1938	1939	UP
Minister of Finance	The Hon. N. C. Havenga MP	1938	1939	UP
Minister of Interior Affairs	The Hon. Richard Stuttaford MP	1938	1939	UP
Minister of Public Health	The Hon. Richard Stuttaford MP	1938	1939	UP
Minister of Labour	The Hon. Harry Lawrence MP	1938	1939	UP
Minister of Lands	The Hon. Jan Kemp MP	1938	1939	UP
Minister of Mines	The Hon. Deneys Reitz MP	1938	1939	UP
Minister of Posts and Telegraphs	The Hon. C. F. Clarkson MP	1938	1939	UP
Minister of Public Works	The Hon. C. F. Clarkson MP	1938	1939	UP
Minister of Railways and Harbours	The Hon. Adriaan Fourie MP	1938	1939	UP
Minister without Portfolio	The Hon. Robert Henderson MP	1938	1939	UP
=== Changes 5 September 1939 === Smuts became Prime Minister and formed his own cabinet after Hertzog was deposed by the party caucus.
Post	Minister	Term		Party
Prime Minister	Gen. Jan Smuts	1939	1943	UP
Minister of Defence	Gen. Jan Smuts	1939	1943	UP
Minister of External Affairs	Gen. Jan Smuts	1939	1943	UP
Deputy Prime Minister	The Hon. Deneys Reitz MP	1939	Dec 1942	UP
Minister of Native Affairs	The Hon. Deneys Reitz MP	1939	Dec 1942	UP
Minister of Agriculture and Forestry	The Hon. W. R. Collins MP	1938	1943	UP
Minister of Commerce and Industry	The Hon. Richard Stuttaford MP	1939	1941	UP
Minister of Education	The Hon. J. F. H. Hofmeyer MP	1939	1943	UP
Minister of Finance	The Hon. J. F. H. Hofmeyer MP	1939	1943	UP
Minister of Interior Affairs	The Hon. Harry Lawrence MP	1939	1943	UP
Minister of Public Health	The Hon. Harry Lawrence MP	1939	1943	UP
Minister of Justice	The Hon. C. F. Steyn MP	1939	1943	UP
Minister of Labour	The Hon. Walter Madeley MP	1939	1943	Labour
Minister of Social Welfare	The Hon. Walter Madeley MP	1939	1943	Labour
Minister of Lands	The Hon. A.M. Conroy MP	1939	1943	UP
Minister of Mines	The Hon. C. F. Stallard MP	1939	1943	Dominion
Minister of Posts and Telegraphs	The Hon. C. F. Clarkson MP	1939	1943	UP
Minister of Public Works	The Hon. C. F. Clarkson MP	1939	1943	UP
Minister without Portfolio	The Hon. P. V. G. van der Byl MP	1939	1943	UP
=== Changes 1941 ===
Post	Minister	Term		Party
Minister of Commerce and Industry	The Hon. Sidney Waterson MP	1941	1943	UP

== Sources ==
- "Geocities – South Africa". Geocities (Web Archive). Archived from the original on 16 October 2007.
