= Malmesbury (House of Assembly of South Africa constituency) =

South African constituency, 1910–1994

- Former constituency for the South African House of Assembly
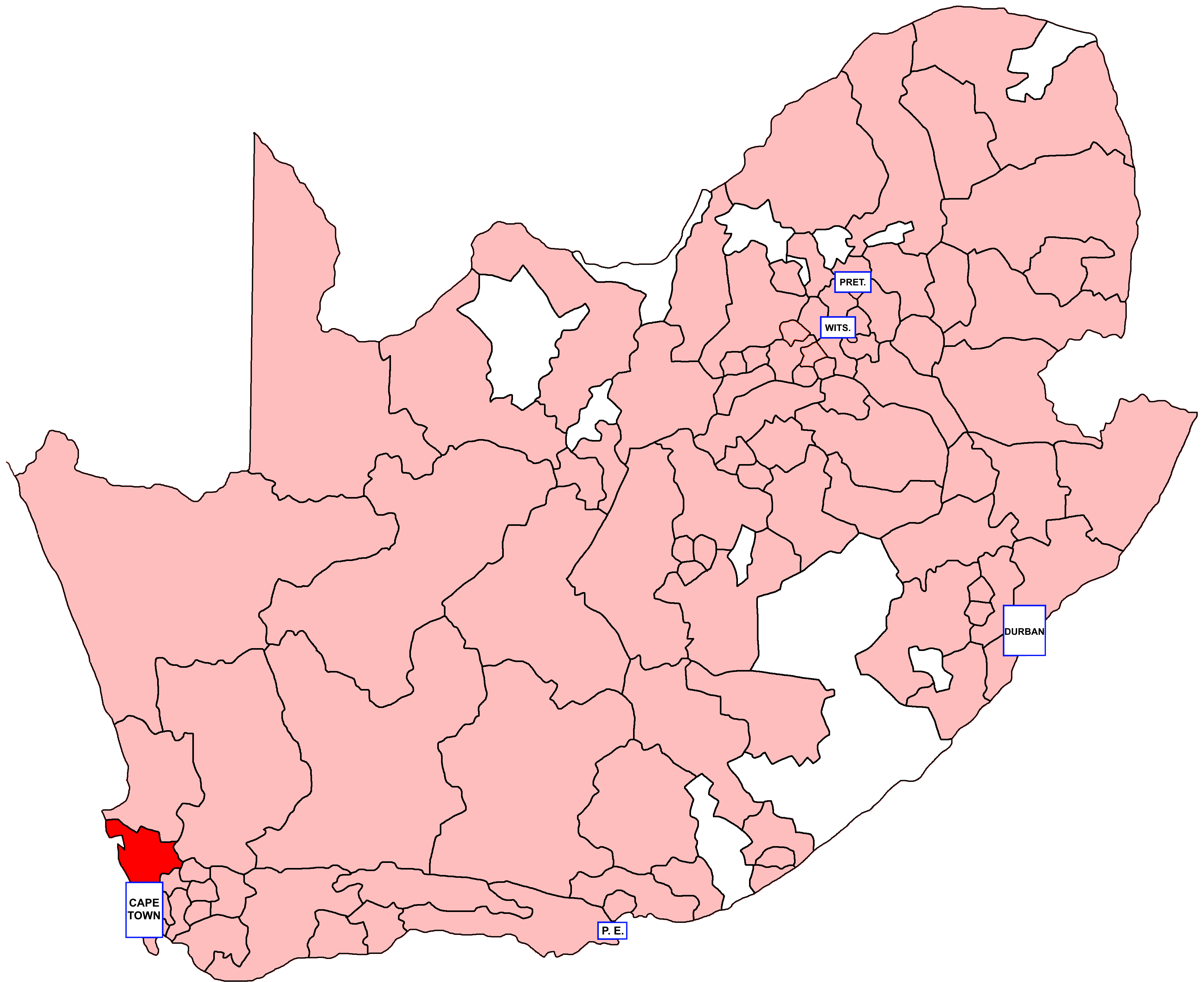
- Location of Malmesbury within South Africa (1981)
- Province: Cape of Good Hope
- Electorate: 20,633 (1989)

Former constituency
- Created: 1910
- Abolished: 1994
- Number of members: 1
- Last MHA: G. J. Kotzé (NP)
- Replaced by: Western Cape

Malmesbury was a constituency in the Cape Province of South Africa, which existed from 1910 to 1994. Named after the town of Malmesbury, the seat covered much of the Swartland region of the Western Cape. Throughout its existence it elected one member to the House of Assembly and one to the Cape Provincial Council.

== Franchise notes ==
When the Union of South Africa was formed in 1910, the electoral qualifications in use in each pre-existing colony were kept in place. The Cape Colony had implemented a “colour-blind” franchise known as the Cape Qualified Franchise, which included all adult literate men owning more than £75 worth of property (controversially raised from £25 in 1892), and this initially remained in effect after the colony became the Cape Province. As of 1908, 22,784 out of 152,221 electors in the Cape Colony were “Native or Coloured”. Eligibility to serve in Parliament and the Provincial Council, however, was restricted to whites from 1910 onward.

The first challenge to the Cape Qualified Franchise came with the Women's Enfranchisement Act, 1930 and the Franchise Laws Amendment Act, 1931, which extended the vote to women and removed property qualifications for the white population only – non-white voters remained subject to the earlier restrictions. In 1936, the Representation of Natives Act removed all black voters from the common electoral roll and introduced three “Native Representative Members”, white MPs elected by the black voters of the province and meant to represent their interests in particular. A similar provision was made for Coloured voters with the Separate Representation of Voters Act, 1951, and although this law was challenged by the courts, it went into effect in time for the 1958 general election, which was thus held with all-white voter rolls for the first time in South African history. The all-white franchise would continue until the end of apartheid and the introduction of universal suffrage in 1994.

== History ==
Malmesbury’s first MP, François Stephanus Malan, was a veteran of Cape Colony politics, and served as a cabinet minister under Louis Botha and Jan Smuts. When Smuts’ government was defeated in the 1924 general election, Malan lost his seat, and with a brief interlude during Smuts’ second government in the 1940s, Malmesbury would remain a safe seat for the National Party for the remainder of its existence. Its last MP, Gert Kotzé, served as a cabinet minister under P. W. Botha and F. W. de Klerk.

== Members ==
Election	Member	Party
1910	F. S. Malan	SAP
1915	F. S. Malan	SAP
1920	F. S. Malan	SAP
1921	F. S. Malan	SAP
1924	P. A. Bergh	National
1929	P. A. Bergh	National
1933	P. A. Bergh	National
1934	P. A. Bergh	United
1938	S. M. Loubser	GNP
1943	J. C. Bosman	United
1948	S. M. Loubser	HNP
1953	S. M. Loubser	National
1958	J. W. van Staden	National
1961	J. W. van Staden	National
1966	J. W. van Staden	National
1970	J. W. van Staden	National
1972 by	E. Louw	National
1974	G. J. Kotzé	National
1977	G. J. Kotzé	National
1981	G. J. Kotzé	National
1987	G. J. Kotzé	National
1989	G. J. Kotzé	National
1994	constituency abolished	

== Detailed results ==
=== Elections in the 1910s ===
General election 1910: Malmesbury
Party	Candidate	Votes	%	±%
South African	F. S. Malan	Unopposed		
South African win (new seat)				

General election 1915: Malmesbury
Party	Candidate	Votes	%	±%
South African	F. S. Malan	1,519	57.5	N/A
National	A. P. W. Immelman	1,125	42.5	New
Majority		394	15.0	N/A
Turnout		2,644	88.4	N/A
South African hold		Swing	N/A	

=== Elections in the 1920s ===
General election 1920: Malmesbury
Party	Candidate	Votes	%	±%
South African	F. S. Malan	1,700	56.8	−0.7
Independent	J. G. van der Horst	1,292	43.2	New
Majority		408	13.6	N/A
Turnout		2,992	81.2	−7.2
South African hold		Swing	N/A	

General election 1921: Malmesbury
Party	Candidate	Votes	%	±%
South African	F. S. Malan	1,756	55.1	−1.7
National	S. F. Malan	1,431	44.9	New
Majority		325	10.2	N/A
Turnout		3,187	83.9	+1.7
South African hold		Swing	N/A	

General election 1924: Malmesbury
Party	Candidate	Votes	%	±%
National	P. A. Bergh	1,981	52.0	+7.1
South African	F. S. Malan	1,788	46.9	−8.2
Rejected ballots		44	1.1	N/A
Majority		193	5.1	N/A
Turnout		3,813	91.2	+7.3
National gain from South African		Swing	+7.7	

General election 1929: Malmesbury
Party	Candidate	Votes	%	±%
National	P. A. Bergh	1,721	51.9	−0.1
South African	F. S. Malan	1,561	47.1	+0.2
Rejected ballots		34	1.0	-0.1
Majority		160	4.8	−0.3
Turnout		3,316	91.7	+0.5
National hold		Swing	-0.2	

=== Elections in the 1930s ===
General election 1933: Malmesbury
Party	Candidate	Votes	%	±%
National	P. A. Bergh	Unopposed		
National hold				

General election 1938: Malmesbury
Party	Candidate	Votes	%	±%
Purified National	S. M. Loubser	3,662	52.4	New
United	P. A. Euvrard	3,254	46.6	N/A
Rejected ballots		66	1.0	N/A
Majority		408	5.8	N/A
Turnout		6,982	93.2	N/A
Purified National gain from United		Swing	N/A	
