= Hendrik Mentz =

South African lawyer, politician and soldier

Minister of Lands and Irrigation
- In office 20 October 1915 – 8 February 1921
- Prime Minister: Louis Botha (until 27 August 1919); Jan Smuts
- Preceded by: Hendrik Schalk Theron
- Succeeded by: Deneys Reitz

Minister of Defence
- In office 3 September 1919 – 29 June 1924
- Prime Minister: Jan Smuts
- Preceded by: Jan Smuts
- Succeeded by: Frederic Creswell

Personal details
- Born: 8 August 1877 Wittebergen, Bethlehem, Orange Free State
- Died: 3 June 1938 (aged 60) Pretoria

Military service
- Allegiance: South African Republic; Union of South Africa
- Years of service: 1899–1902 (Transvaal Commandos); 1914 –1915 (British Imperial Armies)
- Battles/wars: Second Boer War: –Colenso –Spioen kop First World War: –South-West Africa Campaign

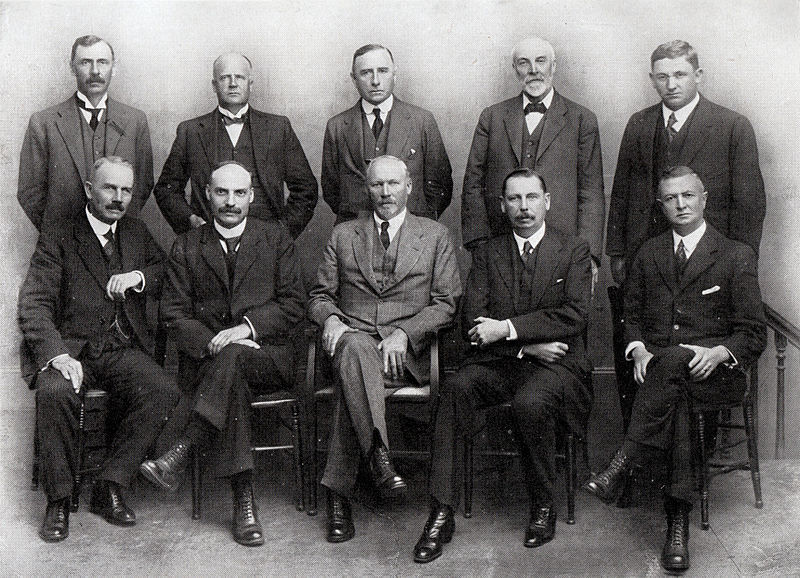
Smuts Cabinet, South African Government (1923)

Hendrik Mentz DTD (8 August 1877 – 3 June 1938) was a South African Party lawyer, politician, soldier and South African Minister of Defence from 1919 to 1924.

== Second Boer War ==
During the Second Boer War, Mentz fought under General Ben Viljoen in Natal, being involved in the siege of Ladysmith and the battles of Colenso and Spion Kop. At the end of the war he was serving as chief of staff to Assistant Commandant-General C. F. Beyers. Mentz was wounded three times during the war.

== Start of political career ==
After the war Mentz settled in Pietersburg, where he practised law and when the Transvaal Colony obtained responsible government in 1906 he was elected to the Legislative Assembly as a supporter of General Louis Botha. In 1910, with the formation of the Union of South Africa, he became the member of the House of Assembly for Soutpansberg.

== First World war ==
At the beginning of the First World War and during the German South West Africa Campaign, Mentz served under Brigadier General M. W. Myburgh, who were among the South African troops that occupied Windhoek. He was appointed military governor of Windhoek by Louis Botha, whereafter his brigade joined the final advance on the north, which culminated in the surrender of the Germans. It was also the end of his military career.

== Cabinet Minister ==
Mentz was appointed Minister of Lands and Irrigation by Louis Botha in 1915, succeeding Hendrik Schalk Theron. In that capacity he did much to bring about the building of dams, which included the Hartbeespoort Dam and the Darlington Dam on the Sundays River. In 1920 Mentz succeeded General Jan Smuts as Minister of Defence, and in 1921 he attended the Imperial Conference in London. One of the consequences of the Imperial Conference was the abolition of the imperial military command in the Union of South Africa.

The South African Naval Service, predecessor of the present South African Navy, was established on 1 April 1922. The Strike Craft SAS Hendrik Mentz of the South African Navy was named after him. Mentz was defeated by Oswald Pirow in the parliamentary election of 1924, and also failed to gain election for the South African Party in 1929, whereafter he had devoted himself to sheep farming and to practising as a solicitor in Pretoria.

== See also ==
- Second Cabinet of Louis Botha
- First Cabinet of Jan Smuts
- Second Cabinet of Jan Smuts

Government offices
Preceded by Jan Smuts	Minister of Defence (South Africa); 1920–1924	Succeeded by Frederic Creswell
