= Dundee (House of Assembly of South Africa constituency) =

- Former constituency for the South African House of Assembly
- Province: Natal
- Electorate: 6,935 (1933)

Former constituency
- Created: 1910
- Abolished: 1938
- Number of members: 1
- Last MHA: Leif Egeland (UP)
- Replaced by: Klip River

Dundee was a constituency in the Natal Province of South Africa, which existed from 1910 to 1938. It covered a rural area in northwestern Natal centred on its namesake town. Throughout its existence it elected one member to the House of Assembly.

== Franchise notes ==
When the Union of South Africa was formed in 1910, the electoral qualifications in use in each pre-existing colony were kept in place. The franchise used in the Natal Colony, while theoretically not restricted by race, was significantly less liberal than that of the Cape, and no more than a few hundred non-white electors ever qualified. In 1908, an estimated 200 of the 22,786 electors in the colony were of non-European descent, and by 1935, only one remained. By 1958, when the last non-white voters in the Cape were taken off the rolls, Natal too had an all-white electorate. The franchise was also restricted by property and education qualifications until the 1933 general election, following the passage of the Women's Enfranchisement Act, 1930 and the Franchise Laws Amendment Act, 1931. From then on, the franchise was given to all white citizens aged 21 or over, which remained the case until the end of apartheid and the introduction of universal suffrage in 1994.

== History ==
As in most of Natal, Dundee's electorate was largely English-speaking and conservative. Its first and longest-serving MP, Thomas Watt, had been a minister in the pre-union government of Natal, and as Natal didn't have partisan elections prior to 1910, he stood for and won election as an independent at the first Union general election. He almost immediately gravitated towards the governing South African Party, however, serving as a cabinet minister under Louis Botha and Jan Smuts' first government, and at every election from 1915 onwards, he was re-elected under the SAP banner. With the SAP having lost power in 1924, Watt served as an opposition MP for one term before retiring from politics in 1929. His successors, George Alfred Friend and Leif Egeland, served just one term each and were significantly less notable, though Egeland would serve as High Commissioner in London for a short time after the seat's abolition.

== Members ==
Election	Member	Party
1910	Thomas Watt	Independent
1915	Thomas Watt	South African
1920	Thomas Watt	South African
1921	Thomas Watt	South African
1924	Thomas Watt	South African
1929	G. A. Friend	South African
1933	Leif Egeland	South African
1934	Leif Egeland	United
1938	Constituency abolished	

== Detailed results ==
=== Elections in the 1910s ===
General election 1910: Dundee
Party	Candidate	Votes	%	±%
Independent	Thomas Watt	749	61.9	New
South African	W. Springorum	291	24.1	New
South African	P. R. N. Vermaak	170	14.1	New
Majority		458	37.8	N/A
Independent win (new seat)				

General election 1915: Dundee
Party	Candidate	Votes	%	±%
South African	Thomas Watt	823	64.6	+2.7
Labour	R. J. Hall	285	22.4	New
Independent	J. Dyson	166	13.0	New
Majority		538	42.2	N/A
Turnout		1,274	65.0	N/A
South African hold		Swing	N/A	

=== Elections in the 1920s ===
General election 1920: Dundee
Party	Candidate	Votes	%	±%
South African	Thomas Watt	377	30.9	−33.7
Unionist	E. M. Greene	360	29.5	New
National	J. H. Kemp	297	24.3	New
Labour	N. R. Baytopp	187	15.3	−7.1
Majority		17	1.4	N/A
Turnout		1,221	67.1	+2.1
South African hold		Swing	N/A	

General election 1921: Dundee
Party	Candidate	Votes	%	±%
South African	Thomas Watt	771	66.4	+35.5
National	J. H. Kemp	391	33.6	+9.3
Majority		17	32.8	N/A
Turnout		1,162	60.1	−7.0
South African hold		Swing	+15.7	

General election 1924: Dundee
Party	Candidate	Votes	%	±%
South African	Thomas Watt	675	52.9	−13.5
National	D. B. Jones	602	47.1	+13.5
Rejected ballots		0	0.0	N/A
Majority		73	5.8	−27.0
Turnout		1,277	72.3	+12.2
South African hold		Swing	-13.5	

General election 1929: Dundee
Party	Candidate	Votes	%	±%
South African	G. A. Friend	1,024	59.4	+6.5
National	J. J. Kemp	689	39.8	−7.3
Rejected ballots		11	0.8	+0.8
Majority		335	19.6	+13.8
Turnout		1,724	78.6	+6.3
South African hold		Swing	+6.9	

=== Elections in the 1930s ===
General election 1933: Dundee
Party	Candidate	Votes	%	±%
South African	Leif Egeland	2,840	54.1	−5.3
Independent	E. A. Benson	1,840	35.0	New
Natal Home Rule Party	W. R. F. Hunt	540	10.3	New
Rejected ballots		31	0.6	-0.2
Majority		335	19.0	N/A
Turnout		5,251	75.7	−2.9
South African hold		Swing	N/A	
