= Saa'd Cachalia =

South African politician

Member of the Limpopo Executive Council for Treasury
- In office November 2006 – 19 July 2013
- Premier: Sello Moloto; Cassel Mathale
- Preceded by: Joyce Mashamba
- Succeeded by: David Masondo

Personal details
- Citizenship: South Africa
- Party: African National Congress

Saa'd Cachalia is a South African politician and diplomat who represented the African National Congress (ANC) in the Limpopo Provincial Legislature from 1994 to 2012. A lawyer by training, he was Limpopo's Member of the Executive Council (MEC) for Treasury from 2006 to 2011. He left provincial politics in 2012 and subsequently served as the South African Ambassador to Qatar and as South African Ambassador to the United Arab Emirates.

== Political career ==
Cachalia practiced as a lawyer during apartheid. In South Africa's first democratic elections in 1994, he was elected to represent the ANC in the Limpopo Provincial Legislature, where he served continuously until 2012.

In November 2006, he was appointed to the Limpopo Executive Council by Premier Sello Moloto, who named him MEC for Treasury. Pursuant to the 2009 general election, he was re-elected to his seat in the Limpopo Provincial Legislature, ranked 21st on the ANC's provincial party list, and he was retained in the Executive Council by newly elected Premier Cassel Mathale.

However, on 28 January 2011, Mathale announced a cabinet reshuffle in which Cachalia was fired and replaced by David Masondo. News24 reported that, according to government sources, Cachalia's relationship with Mathale had soured because he and his head of department, Rob Tooley, had "resisted political pressure" to allocate additional funds to projects that they considered frivolous, including a R40-million proposal to establish a television studio in the Office of the Premier.

== Diplomatic career ==
Later in 2011, the Mail & Guardian reported that Cachalia was enrolled in a diplomatic training course in Pretoria and that President Jacob Zuma was expected to appoint him as South Africa's Ambassador to Qatar. He arrived in Qatar in 2012 and served there until the end of November 2016. He was later appointed as South African Ambassador to the United Arab Emirates, where he remained as of 2022.
