= Thomas Orr (politician) =

African politician

The Honourable Thomas Orr CMG

Minister of Finance
- In office 1917–1920
- Preceded by: Henry Burton
- Succeeded by: Henry Burton

Minister of Posts and Telegraphs
- In office 1919–1920

Thomas Orr, CMG (died May 1937) was an Irish-born South African politician. He was Minister of Finance from 1917 to 1920.

== Biography ==
Orr was born in Loughgall, Ireland, the son of Joseph Orr, of County Armagh. He was educated at Royal School Dungannon. He joined the British civil service in 1875, and was appointed to the Exchequer and Audit Department.

In 1902, Orr was appointed Auditor-General for Natal, holding the office until his retirement on the establishment of the Union of South Africa in 1910. The same year, he was elected to the Union House of Assembly for Pietermaritzburg (North). In 1917, Orr was appointed Minister of Finance in General Louis Botha's government. From 1919 to 1920, he was also Minister of Posts and Telegraphs.

He was defeated in the 1920 general election by the Labour Party's Thomas Strachan. After his defeat, Orr was appointed to the Railway Board, serving until 1925.

He was appointed a CMG in the 1912 New Year Honours.
