= Soutpansberg (House of Assembly of South Africa constituency) =

- Former constituency for the South African House of Assembly
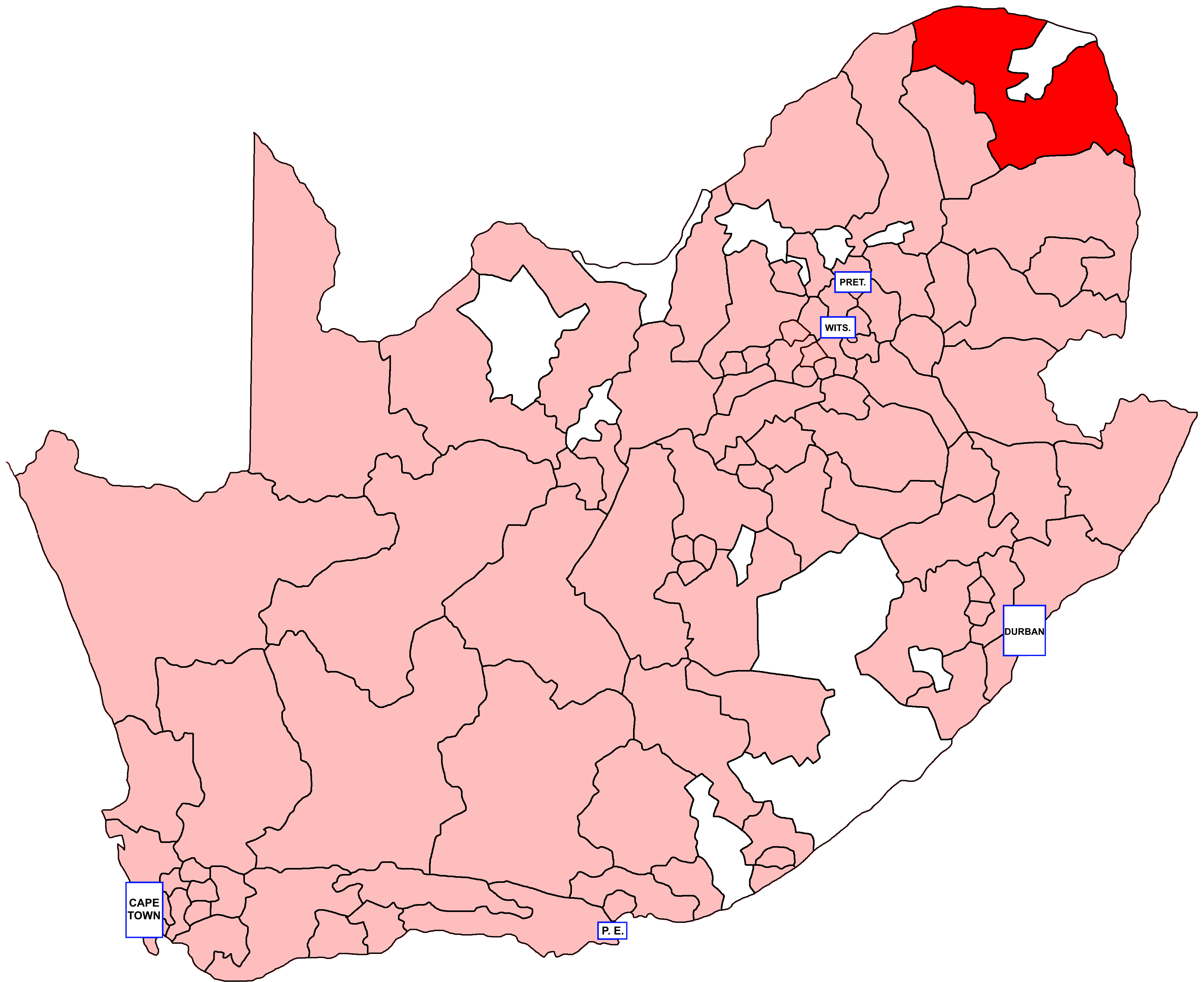
- Location of Soutpansberg within South Africa (1981)
- Province: Transvaal
- Electorate: 18,753 (1989)

Former constituency
- Created: 1910
- Abolished: 1994
- Number of members: 1
- Last MHA: Thomas Langley (CP)
- Replaced by: Limpopo

Soutpansberg, also spelled Zoutpansberg early in its history, was a constituency in the Transvaal Province of South Africa, which existed from 1910 to 1994. It covered the Soutpansberg region of far-northern Transvaal, close to the Limpopo River and the border with Zimbabwe. Throughout its existence it elected one member to the House of Assembly and one to the Transvaal Provincial Council.

== Franchise notes ==
When the Union of South Africa was formed in 1910, the electoral qualifications in use in each pre-existing colony were kept in place. In the Transvaal Colony, and its predecessor the South African Republic, the vote was restricted to white men, and as such, elections in the Transvaal Province were held on a whites-only franchise from the beginning. The franchise was also restricted by property and education qualifications until the 1933 general election, following the passage of the Women's Enfranchisement Act, 1930 and the Franchise Laws Amendment Act, 1931. From then on, the franchise was given to all white citizens aged 21 or over. Non-whites remained disenfranchised until the end of apartheid and the introduction of universal suffrage in 1994.

== History ==
Soutpansberg, like most of the rural Transvaal, had a largely Afrikaans-speaking electorate and was a conservative seat throughout its existence. Its first MP, Hendrik Mentz, was a former Boer soldier and ally of Louis Botha who served in cabinet for most of his time as an MP. In 1924, he was defeated for re-election by Oswald Pirow of the National Party, who would go on to become one of the leading ideologues of that party, but he only represented Soutpansberg for five years, opting instead to (unsuccessfully) challenge Jan Smuts in his seat of Standerton in 1929. In the 1930s, the South African and National parties fused into the United Party, and Soutpansberg was held by the new party until its nationwide electoral defeat in 1948.

From then on, Soutpansberg would be a safe Nationalist seat. Its longest-serving MP, Stephanus Petrus "Fanie" Botha, served in cabinet under John Vorster and P. W. Botha, resigning in disgrace in 1983 after it was revealed that he'd taken money from Israel. The resulting by-election was won by the nascent Conservative Party - the first electoral victory for that party, which had formed less than two years earlier, and which would see much success in the rural Transvaal as the NP moved away from unconditional white supremacy. Thomas Langley, the Conservative MP elected in 1984, would represent Soutpansberg until the end of apartheid.

== Members ==
Election	Member	Party
1910	Hendrik Mentz	Het Volk
1915	Hendrik Mentz	South African
1920	Hendrik Mentz	South African
1921	Hendrik Mentz	South African
1924	Oswald Pirow	National
1929	W. H. Vorster	National
1933	E. A. Rooth	National
1934	E. A. Rooth	United
1938	E. A. Rooth	United
1943	S. A. Cilliers	United
1948	J. J. F. van Schoor	HNP
1952 by	E. J. Smit	National
1953	E. J. Smit	National
1958	S. P. Botha	National
1961	S. P. Botha	National
1966	S. P. Botha	National
1970	S. P. Botha	National
1974	S. P. Botha	National
1977	S. P. Botha	National
1981	S. P. Botha	National
1984 by	Thomas Langley	Conservative
1987	Thomas Langley	Conservative
1989	Thomas Langley	Conservative
1994	Constituency abolished	

== Detailed results ==
=== Elections in the 1910s ===
General election 1910: Soutpansberg
Party	Candidate	Votes	%	±%
Het Volk	Hendrik Mentz	Unopposed		
Het Volk win (new seat)				

General election 1915: Soutpansberg
Party	Candidate	Votes	%	±%
South African	Hendrik Mentz	1,188	54.6	N/A
National	F. W. Beyers	987	45.4	New
Majority		201	9.2	N/A
Turnout		2,175	78.2	N/A
South African hold		Swing	N/A	

=== Elections in the 1920s ===
General election 1920: Soutpansberg
Party	Candidate	Votes	%	±%
South African	Hendrik Mentz	988	57.7	+3.1
National	Oswald Pirow	725	42.3	−3.1
Majority		263	15.4	+6.2
Turnout		1,713	62.9	−15.3
South African hold		Swing	+3.1	

General election 1921: Soutpansberg
Party	Candidate	Votes	%	±%
South African	Hendrik Mentz	997	54.5	−3.2
National	Oswald Pirow	833	45.5	+3.2
Majority		164	9.0	−6.4
Turnout		1,830	61.4	−1.5
South African hold		Swing	-3.2	

General election 1924: Soutpansberg
Party	Candidate	Votes	%	±%
National	Oswald Pirow	1,153	55.2	+9.7
South African	Hendrik Mentz	927	44.4	−10.1
Rejected ballots		10	0.4	N/A
Majority		226	10.8	N/A
Turnout		2,090	80.6	+19.2
National hold		Swing	+9.9	

General election 1929: Soutpansberg
Party	Candidate	Votes	%	±%
National	W. H. Vorster	1,083	53.7	−1.5
South African	J. R. van Breda	914	45.3	+0.9
Rejected ballots		20	1.0	+0.6
Majority		169	8.4	−2.4
Turnout		2,017	77.8	−2.8
National hold		Swing	-1.2	

=== Elections in the 1930s ===
General election 1933: Soutpansberg
Party	Candidate	Votes	%	±%
National	E. A. Rooth	2,672	85.5	+31.8
Independent	W. H. Vorster	419	13.4	New
Rejected ballots		34	0.7	-0.3
Majority		2,253	72.1	N/A
Turnout		3,125	63.6	−14.2
National hold		Swing	N/A	

General election 1938: Soutpansberg
Party	Candidate	Votes	%	±%
United	E. A. Rooth	2,386	57.8	−27.7
Purified National	S. W. Spies	1,686	40.8	New
Rejected ballots		56	1.4	+0.7
Majority		700	17.0	N/A
Turnout		4,128	79.9	+16.3
United hold		Swing	N/A	
