= David Masondo =

South African politician (born 1974)

The Honourable David Masondo MP
- Masondo in 2023

Deputy Minister of Finance
- Incumbent
- Assumed office 30 May 2019 Serving with Ashor Sarupen (since 2024)
- President: Cyril Ramaphosa
- Minister: Enoch Godongwana; Tito Mboweni
- Preceded by: Mondli Gungubele

Member of the National Assembly
- Incumbent
- Assumed office 22 May 2019

Second Deputy General Secretary of the South African Communist Party
- Incumbent
- Assumed office 15 July 2022
- Secretary: Solly Mapaila
- First Deputy: Madala Masuku
- Preceded by: Chris Matlhako
Prior offices 2003–2014
Member of the Limpopo Provincial Legislature
In office February 2011 – 6 May 2014
Member of the Limpopo Executive Council for Provincial Treasury
In office February 2011 – July 2013
Premier	Cassel Mathale
Preceded by	Saa'd Cachalia
Succeeded by	Rudolph Phala
Chairperson of the Young Communist League of South Africa
In office December 2003 – December 2010
Secretary	Buti Manamela
Preceded by	League re-established
Succeeded by	Yershen Pillay

Personal details
- Born: 14 November 1974 (age 51) Elim, Northern Transvaal; South Africa
- Party: African National Congress
- Other political affiliations: South African Communist Party
- Education: Witwatersrand University; New York University (PhD)

David Masondo (born 14 November 1974) is a South African politician who is currently serving as Deputy Minister of Finance since May 2019. He is also the second deputy general secretary of the South African Communist Party (SACP) and a member of the National Executive Committee of the African National Congress (ANC).

Born in Limpopo, Masondo entered politics as a student activist, serving as deputy president of the South African Students Congress and later as the provincial chairperson of the ANC Youth League from 2003 to 2005. He rose to national prominence as the inaugural chairperson of the SACP's Young Communist League from 2003 to 2010. By the end of his tenure in that position, he had broken ranks with the SACP's national leadership to emerge as a political opponent of President Jacob Zuma.

From February 2011 to May 2014, Masondo represented the ANC in the Limpopo Provincial Legislature, where he was Member of the Executive Council for Finance until July 2013 under Premier Cassel Mathale. His department was controversially placed under national administration in December 2011. He was elected to the National Assembly in the 2019 general election, whereafter he was appointed as Deputy Minister of Finance under the second cabinet of President Cyril Ramaphosa.

A member of the SACP since 1993, Masondo was first elected to the party's Central Committee in July 2007. He was elected to a five-year term as second deputy secretary in July 2022. He joined the ANC National Executive Committee in December 2017, and he has been the principal of the ANC's political school, the O. R. Tambo School of Leadership, since it was launched in 2019.

== Early life and education ==
Masondo was born on 14 November 1974 in Elim, a village near Makhado in the former Northern Transvaal. He matriculated at Marimane High School in Makhado. After high school, he attended Giyani College of Education, where he joined the South African Students Congress, becoming its provincial chairperson in 1996 and its national deputy president in 1997.

He went on to the University of the Witwatersrand, where he was president of the student representative council in 1998 and where he graduated with a BA, Honours, and MA. In 2001, he was reportedly injured in a clash with campus security forces during a student protest against a visit by Colin Powell, the United States Secretary of State.

In 2014, he completed a PhD in Sociology focusing on Political Economy under the supervision of Vivek Chibber at New York University. His dissertation, about post-apartheid automotive industrial policy in South Africa, was published in the Review of African Political Economy. His PhD research was supported by a Ford Foundation International Fellowship.

== Early political career ==
In 1999, Masondo was appointed to the National Youth Commission. After his term there, he worked at the headquarters of the South African Communist Party (SACP), which he had joined in 1993; he headed the party's political education and youth desks. He later served a stint in the provincial government of Limpopo, where he was a director in the department of local government and housing, and in 2006 he returned to Wits to pursue his PhD and work as a lecturer in political economy.

Because of his continued involvement in youth politics, Masondo was named by the Mail & Guardian in 2003 as one of 20 politicians who would "emerge as key figures in our public life over the next 10 years"; on several occasions in later years, he was one of the newspaper's 200 Young South Africans.

=== Young Communist League ===
In December 2003, Masondo was elected as the inaugural chairperson of the newly re-established Young Communist League (YCL) of the SACP. Concurrently with this position, he was elected to the SACP's Central Committee for the first time at the party's 12th national congress in July 2007; he was the most popular candidate in the elections, receiving 989 votes across 1,298 ballots.

In its early years, the YCL, under the leadership of Masondo and general secretary Buti Manamela, was aligned to opponents of incumbent President Thabo Mbeki, and therefore to supporters of presidential challenger Jacob Zuma. In 2006, for example, when Mazibuko Jara wrote a controversial article questioning the SACP's support for Zuma, Masondo responded in an article called Red is the Colour of our Flag: In Defence of the Rule of Law, in which he argued that Zuma's corruption trial arose primarily from "a political agenda" related to the ANC's succession battle. Later the same year, Masondo publicly called Mbeki a "dictator" during a press conference. However, after Zuma took office as president in 2009, Masondo diverged from Manamela – and from SACP secretary general Blade Nzimande – in becoming increasingly critical of Zuma. For example, in September 2010, he wrote an opinion piece about black economic empowerment (BEE) in City Press in which he argued:

BEE is increasingly becoming too narrow, amounting to ZEE, that is, Zuma Economic Empowerment. The recent multi-billion-rand Arcelor-Mittal BEE deal involving Duduzane, President Jacob Zuma's son, is another example of how BEE has become too narrow. Only a few can be misled to believe that there is no link between Zuma's rise to the presidency and his family's rise to riches.

During the same period, in 2009, the YCL backed Julius Malema's calls for the nationalisation of the mining industry. Asked about the likely effects of this policy for foreign direct investment, Masondo said, "Investment for what and for whom? Investors must invest on our own terms and we must have control over the dividends of our work and resources." Masondo reportedly spoke in support of nationalisation during closed sessions of the ANC's 2010 national general council.

He remained in office as YCL chairperson until December 2010, when he stepped down at the YCL's third national congress. He was booed by Manamela's pro-Zuma supporters at the conference, but he dismissed the heckling as part of a "general pattern of degeneration in the youth movement".

=== ANC Youth League ===
Masondo was also a member of the African National Congress (ANC), the SACP's partner in the Tripartite Alliance. From 2003 to 2005, he was the provincial chairperson of the ANC Youth League in Limpopo, and he was later a member of the league's National Executive Committee.

== Limpopo Executive Council: 2011–2013 ==
On 28 January 2011, Masondo was appointed to the Limpopo Executive Council in a reshuffle by Premier Cassel Mathale, who named him to succeed Saa'd Cachalia as Member of the Executive Council (MEC) for Provincial Treasury. His appointment was unexpected but was presumed to be a reflection of his increasing closeness to Zuma's opponents, who included Mathale and his allies in the ANC Youth League. In order to take up the office, he returned to South Africa from the United States and was sworn in to the Limpopo Provincial Legislature.

=== Zuma's re-election bid ===
After Masondo had been in the treasury for less than a year, the national government announced in December 2011 that Masondo's department was one of five that was being placed under administration due to financial problems. Masondo's supporters argued that this was Zuma's way of weakening his opponents ahead of the ANC's 53rd National Conference, at which Zuma would stand for re-election. As late as 2018, Masondo said, "National Treasury was used to withhold funds due to the provincial government in order to create a cashflow crisis, to justify the disbandment of the provincial government".

Later in December 2011, Masondo was elected to the Provincial Executive Committee of the Limpopo ANC; he was the second-most popular candidate, closely trailing Lydia Komape. However, his opposition to Zuma was not the majority position in the national ANC. According to former ANC Youth League president Julius Malema, during this period, Masondo was involved in the discussions that led ultimately to the formation of the Economic Freedom Fighters, a breakaway from the ANC. According to Malema, he, Masondo, and Floyd Shivambu, contemplating how they would respond to their alienation in the national ANC, had mooted the idea of establishing a new political party:

We had a very lengthy discussion. I remember that day. And we didn't resolve, we therefore left it and then I went to Polokwane, but myself and Floyd then continued the discussion, telephonically and we could see Masondo's reluctance on the political party... We concluded Masondo was dragging his feet.

Masondo's opposition to Zuma's re-election also set him at odds with the majority position in the SACP leadership. By the time Masondo left his YCL office in 2010, his relations with SACP general secretary Blade Nzimande were already poor, and tensions intensified in subsequent years, particularly as Masondo was increasingly touted as a candidate to succeed Nzimande. At the SACP's next national congress in July 2012, Masondo failed to gain re-election to the Central Committee.

=== Dismissal ===
In July 2013, Stan Mathabatha was elected as premier after Mathale was asked to resign by the ANC. On 19 July, announcing his new Executive Council, Mathabatha sacked Masondo, replacing him with Rudolph Phala. Masondo remained an ordinary Member of the Provincial Legislature until the 2014 general election.

== Public and party administration: 2014–2019 ==
After departing the legislature, Masondo served a brief stint in the Gauteng Provincial Government as a chief director in the provincial Department of Economic Development. In April 2015, he joined the Automotive Industry Development Centre, an agency of the Gauteng Provincial Government, as acting chief executive officer; he was appointed permanently to that position in November.

At the ANC's 54th National Conference in December 2017, Masondo was elected to the party's National Executive Committee. He was the fourth-most popular candidate in the 80-member committee, behind only Zweli Mkhize, Lindiwe Zulu, and Reginah Mhaule. In a committee meeting shortly after the conference, it was reportedly Masondo who first raised the prospect of removing Jacob Zuma from office as president, a motion which came to fruition in February. Also in the aftermath of the conference, Masondo was appointed as deputy chairperson of the ANC's subcommittee on political education, deputising Nathi Mthethwa. He was subsequently appointed as the inaugural principal of the O. R. Tambo School of Leadership, the party's political school, which was launched in Midrand in April 2019.

Meanwhile, at the SACP's 14th national congress in July 2017, Masondo was not elected to return to the Central Committee, despite lobbying by some of his supporters. However, in June 2019, he returned to the committee by co-option.

== Deputy Minister of Finance: 2019–present ==
In the 2019 general election, Masondo was elected to a seat in the National Assembly, the lower house of the South African Parliament. He was ranked 19th on the ANC's national party list. After the election, President Cyril Ramaphosa appointed him as Deputy Minister of Finance under Minister Tito Mboweni. The Mail & Guardian surmised that he was "set to be groomed to take over the running of the treasury". He was characterised variously as "a rising star"; as "arguably the most promising member of the ANC's younger generation"; and, by Richard Calland, as "young, intellectual, energetic, and one of the few ANC politicians around who still care about policy debate and ideas".

In his capacity as deputy minister, Masondo was appointed to chair the Public Investment Corporation in November 2021. Mboweni also appointed him to lead the ministry's pro-growth structural economic reform programme, which the Business Day viewed as a wise choice because of Masondo's closeness to the left.

=== Abuse of power allegation ===
In July 2020, the ANC's internal Integrity Commission recommended that Masondo should step aside from his government and party responsibilities after he was involved in a perceived abuse of power. The finding arose from a personal dispute between Masondo and a woman, later identified as Palesa Lebitse, with whom he had an extramarital affair. Masondo reported Lebitse to the police, alleging that she was extorting him, and she was arrested by the Hawks in a sting operation on 17 August 2019. It later emerged, through reporting by amaBhungane, that Masondo had offered money to Lebitse in exchange for "peace"; according to Lebitse, Masondo had pressured her to abort a pregnancy in January 2019, and she in turn had pressured him to allow "dialogue" between their families about payment of damages. During a subsequent investigation by the Commission for Gender Equality, Masondo admitted to having had protected sex with Lebitse on one occasion but said that they had not been in a romantic relationship, that he was not responsible for her pregnancy, and that he had not encouraged her to have an abortion.

In any case, in February 2020, the National Prosecuting Authority declined to prosecute Lebitse on extortion charges. However, Lebitse pursued a civil lawsuit against Masondo, the head of the Hawks, and the Police Minister Bheki Cele, alleging that Masondo had abused state resources and his own political influence in order to effect her arrest, which she said had been unlawful. Masondo approached the ANC's Integrity Commission to seek advice on his response. In July 2020, the commission recommended that Masondo should step aside, with commission chairperson George Mashamba writing:

Your actions have brought disrepute to the organisation, but in acknowledging this and taking responsibility, you have shown commitment to the organisation and the ideals we strive to reach. We have confidence that lessons have been learnt from the ordeal you are going through. We accept that your lawyers have advised you to report the matter to the Hawks and that you acted on their advice. However, we think that you showed poor judgment and that you should have known that involving the Hawks in a domestic matter would open you up to accusations that you were abusing your power and your access to state resources.

The commission's report also said that Masondo had "never expressed remorse", had provided a "garbled lengthy and nonsensical account" of the saga", and had provided "disappointing, distasteful and patronising" answers to the commission's questions about gender-based violence. Masondo said he was surprised by the commission's recommendation, and he did not step aside.

=== Party leadership campaigns ===
At the SACP's next national congress in Boksburg in July 2022, Masondo made what the Sunday Times called "a spectacular comeback" in the party. He was returned to the Central Committee when he was elected, unopposed, to succeed Chris Matlhako as second deputy general secretary of the party; he serves alongside first deputy secretary Madala Masuku and under general secretary Solly Mapaila.

Later the same year, Masondo launched a campaign to succeed Gwede Mantashe as national chairperson of the ANC. He performed poorly in the nominations stage of the contest, and he was expected to split the vote with Mantashe; both were viewed as supporters of President Ramaphosa. When the ANC's 55th National Conference was held in December, Masondo lost resolutely in the chairmanship race; he received only 282 votes against Mantashe's 2,062 and Stan Mathabatha's 2,018. However, he was re-elected to the ANC National Executive Committee; he received 1,304 votes across roughly 4,000 ballots, ranking him 41st in the 80-member committee. As of 2023, he also remained the principal of the O. R. Tambo School.

== Personal life ==
Masondo is married and has two children. He is the founding chairperson of Topisa Trust, a youth development fund in Limpopo which he established in honour of his mother, Topisa Evelyn Maluleke.

On 16 July 2008, while Masondo was YCL chairperson, he was arrested at a roadblock in Johannesburg; according to police, he had been jogging in Sandringham when he was stopped at the roadblock, but he had refused to submit to a search and then had assaulted a police officer. He was charged with assault and interference with police duty. The SACP, however, said that it was Masondo who had been assaulted in the altercation and that it would lay a complaint with the Independent Complaints Directorate and South African Human Rights Commission.
