= Minister of Finance (South Africa) =

Cabinet post in South Africa

South Africa Minister of Finance
- Flag of South Africa

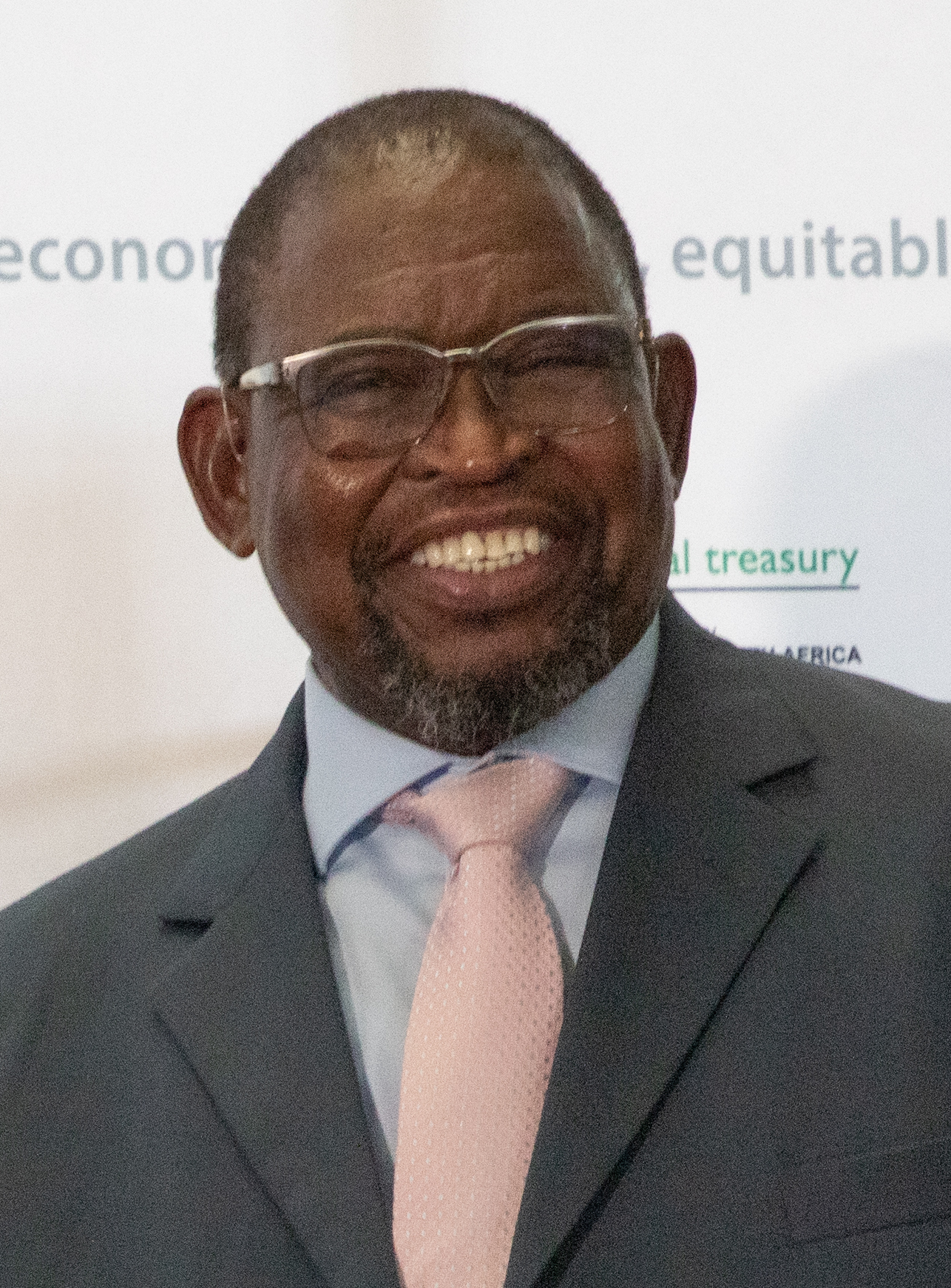
- Incumbent; Enoch Godongwana since 5 August 2021
- National Treasury
- Style: The Honourable
- Appointer: President of South Africa
- Inaugural holder: Henry Charles Hull
- Formation: 1910-05-31
- Deputy: David Masondo (ANC); Ashor Sarupen (DA)
- Salary: R2,211,937
- Website: National Treasury

The minister of finance is a minister in the Cabinet of South Africa who is the political head of the National Treasury. The minister of finance is responsible for the financial management of government affairs, drawing up the budget, and developing economic policy (in cooperation with the minister of economic development and the minister of trade and industry). The minister of finance is also responsible for the South African Revenue Service.

== List, 1910–present ==
Name	Portrait	Term		Party	President (Prime Minister before 1984)
Henry Charles Hull		1910-05-31	1912	SAP	Louis Botha (I) (II)
Jan Smuts		1912	1915-10-20	SAP	Louis Botha (I) (II)
Sir David Graaff		1915	1916		Louis Botha (I) (II)
Henry Burton		1916	1917	SAP	Louis Botha (I) (II)
Thomas Orr		1917	1920-03-20	SAP	Louis Botha (I) (II)
Thomas Orr		1917	1920-03-20	SAP	Jan Smuts (takes office after Botha's death)
Henry Burton		1920-03-20	1924-06-19	SAP	Jan Smuts (I) (II)
N.C. Havenga		1924-06-20	1939-09-04	NP	J.B.M. Hertzog (I) (II) (III) (IV)
N.C. Havenga		1924-06-20	1939-09-04	UP	J.B.M. Hertzog (I) (II) (III) (IV)
J.F.H. Hofmeyer		1939-09-08	1948-05-25	UP	Jan Smuts (takes office after Hertzog's resignation)
J.F.H. Hofmeyer		1939-09-08	1948-05-25	UP	Jan Smuts (III)
N.C. Havenga		1948-05-24	1954	HNP	D.F. Malan (I) (II)
E.H. Louw		1954	1956	HNP	D.F. Malan (I) (II)
Tom Naudé		1956	1958-04-15	HNP	D.F. Malan (I) (II)
T.E. Dönges		1958-04-16	1967	NP	Strydom (I)
T.E. Dönges		1958-04-16	1967	NP	Hendrik Verwoerd (takes office after Strydom's death)
T.E. Dönges		1958-04-16	1967	NP	Hendrik Verwoerd (I) (II)
Nico Diederichs		1967	1975	NP	Hendrik Verwoerd (I) (II)
Nico Diederichs		1967	1975	NP	B.J. Vorster (takes office after Verwoerd's death)
Nico Diederichs		1967	1975	NP	B.J. Vorster (I) (II) (III)
Owen Horwood		1975	1984	NP	B.J. Vorster (I) (II) (III)
Owen Horwood		1975	1984	NP	P.W. Botha (I) (II)
Barend du Plessis		1984	1992	NP	P.W. Botha (I) (II)
Barend du Plessis		1984	1992	NP	F.W. de Klerk (I)
Derek Keys		1992	1994-09-19	NP	F.W. de Klerk (I)
Derek Keys		1992	1994-09-19	NP	Nelson Mandela (Government of National Unity)
Chris Liebenberg		1994-09-19	1996-04-04	None	Nelson Mandela (Government of National Unity)
Trevor Manuel		1996-04-04	2009-05-10	ANC	Nelson Mandela (Government of National Unity)
Trevor Manuel		1996-04-04	2009-05-10	ANC	Thabo Mbeki (I) (II)
Trevor Manuel		1996-04-04	2009-05-10	ANC	Kgalema Motlanthe (takes office after Mbeki's resignation)
Pravin Gordhan		2009-05-11	2014-05-25	ANC	Jacob Zuma (I) (II)
Nhlanhla Nene		2014-05-25	2015-12-09	ANC	Jacob Zuma (I) (II)
David van Rooyen		2015-12-09	2015-12-13	ANC	Jacob Zuma (I) (II)
Pravin Gordhan		2015-12-13	2017-03-31	ANC	Jacob Zuma (I) (II)
Malusi Gigaba		2017-03-31	2018-02-27	ANC	Jacob Zuma (I) (II)
Nhlanhla Nene		2018-02-27	2018-10-09	ANC	Cyril Ramaphosa
Tito Mboweni		2018-10-09	2021-08-05	ANC	Cyril Ramaphosa
Enoch Godongwana		2021-08-05		ANC	Cyril Ramaphosa
