= Harry van Heerden =

South African politician (1862–1933)

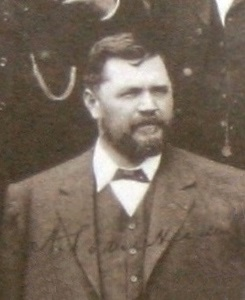

President of the Senate of the Union of South Africa
- In office 1920–1929

Personal details
- Born: 2 September 1862
- Died: 17 July 1933 (aged 70)
- Spouse: Hendrina Jacomina Hattingh
- Children: Hercules Christiaan, Pieter Willemse, George Marthinus, Godlieb Christian

Hercules Christiaan van Heerden, commonly known as Harry van Heerden (Schaapskraal, Tarkastad, Cape Colony, 2 September 1862 – Schaapskraal, Tarkastad, 17 July 1933), was a South African farmer and politician.

Van Heerden was president of the Senate of the Union of South Africa from 1920 to 1929.

== Personal life ==
Van Heerden married Hendrina Jacomina Hattingh on the 23rd of September, 1884. They had at least four children: Hercules Christiaan, Pieter Willemse, George (sometimes Georg) Marthinus and Godlieb Christian.
