= Charles Francis Clarkson =

South African politician

Charles Francis Clarkson (1881–1959) was a South African politician.

He was at various times Minister of Posts and Telegraphs and Minister of Public Works, and Minister of the Interior from 1933 to 1948.
