= Andrew Meintjes Conroy =

South African politician

Andrew Meintjes Conroy, DSO (27 October 1877 – 7 December 1951) was a South African politician. He was Minister of Lands from 1939 until 1948.

Conroy was MP for Victoria West from 1917 to 1920 and senator for Cape Province from 1927 to 1929 and from 1932 until 1951.
