= Oswald Pirow =

South African far-right politician (1890–1959)

Oswald Pirow QC
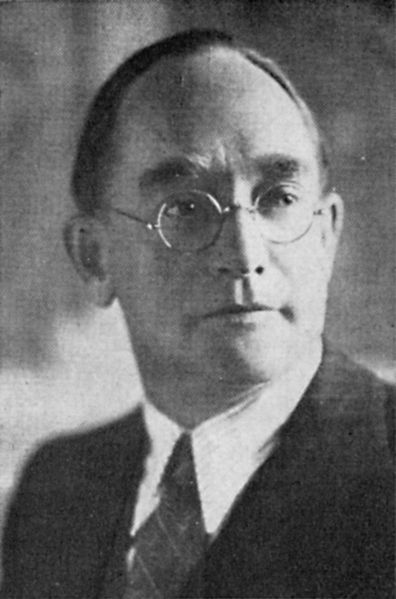

Minister of Justice of South Africa
- In office 1929–1933
- Prime Minister: J. B. M. Hertzog
- Preceded by: Tielman Roos
- Succeeded by: Jan Smuts

Minister of Defence of South Africa
- In office 1933–1939
- Prime Minister: J. B. M. Hertzog
- Preceded by: Frederic Creswell
- Succeeded by: Jan Smuts

Personal details
- Born: 14 August 1890 Aberdeen, Eastern Cape, Cape Colony (now Eastern Cape, South Africa)
- Died: 11 October 1959 (aged 69) Pretoria, Transvaal, Union of South Africa
- Party: National Party
- Spouse: Else Piel
- Children: 2 sons, 2 daughters
- Profession: Lawyer

Oswald Pirow, QC (14 August 1890 – 11 October 1959) was a South African lawyer and far-right politician who held office as minister of justice, and later minister of defence for the National and United Party, respectively. Pirow eventually left the UP upon the Second World War and joined Daniel Malan's reunited National Party, but eventually broke when Pirow founded the New Order of South Africa, a marginal fascist group that disbanded before the end of the war. A celebrated jurist, including by future President Nelson Mandela, he served the NP government as a prosecutor in the 1956 Treason Trial until his death.

== Early life ==
Born in Aberdeen, Cape Colony (now Eastern Cape South Africa), Pirow was the son of German immigrants - he was the elder son of Carl Ferdinand Pirow, a doctor of medicine. He was educated at Potchefstroom, Transvaal, before continuing his education in Germany and England. He was admitted to the Middle Temple on 15 October 1910 and was Called to the Bar on 4 June 1913. He then practised law in Pretoria, becoming a King's Counsel in 1925. He married Else Piel in 1919, the marriage producing two sons and two daughters. During this time Pirow was a keen sportsman and was a champion at the javelin throw, whilst also excelling at boxing, wrestling, fencing, sprinting, swimming, horsemanship and big game hunting.

Pirow came to prominence in the early 1920s following a strike by white gold miners in the Witwatersrand, who were striking against the introduction of cheaper black labourers to the mines. The strike was put down when the government sent in troops, but in the resulting court cases Pirow was noted for his defence of the strike leaders.

== Move into politics ==
Pirow came under the influence of Tielman Roos, an important figure in Transvaal and became a member of James Barry Munnik Hertzog's National Party being elected to parliament for Soutpansberg in 1924. He was eliminated in 1929 however after running against Jan Smuts in Standerton. However, despite this he was appointed to the Cabinet as Minister of Justice in place of Roos, who stood down, initially as a nominated senator. He won a by-election in October 1929 in Gezina however to confirm things and continued to represent the seat until 1943.

Pirow advocated the merger of the National Party to the South African Party and became a leading member of their new government, forming Hertzog's 'inner cabinet' alongside Smuts and N.C. Havenga. Aviation had been an early hobby of Pirow's and thus was to influence his work as a cabinet minister. His role in the cabinet also included responsibility for railways and harbours and from this basis he founded South African Airways and furnished it with Junkers aircraft. For Pirow, a strong advocate of both republicanism and a greatly increased role for South Africa in Africa as a whole, the foundation of the national airline was an important step in making the country more powerful.

== Nazism ==
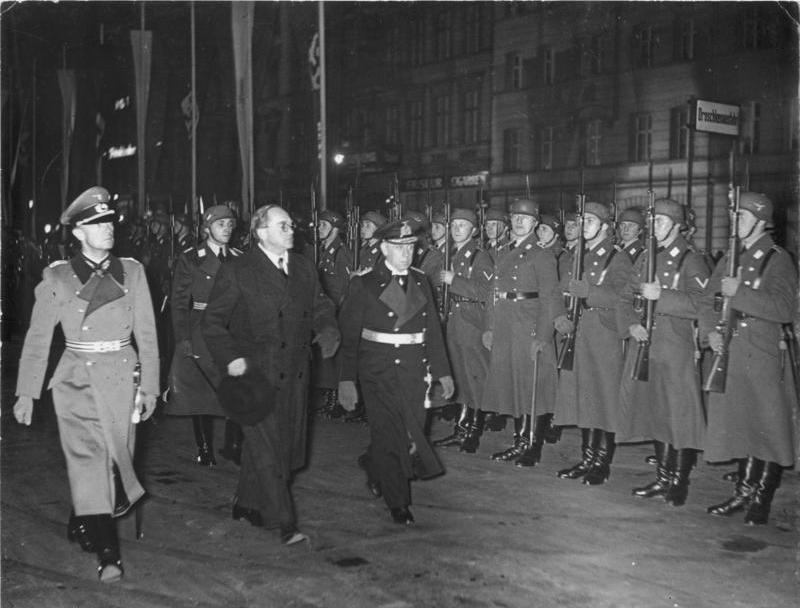
November 1938: Pirow being sent off in Berlin with soldiers from the Luftwaffe, to his left Wilhelm Canaris, to his right Ernst Seifert, photo from the German Federal Archives

A vehement anti-communist (indeed, when running in Gezina in 1929 Pirow vowed to legislate communism out of existence), Pirow became an admirer of Adolf Hitler after meeting him in 1933. In January 1935, the German cruiser Emden visited Cape Town, where Pirow arrived to welcome Karl Dönitz, the captain of the Emden, to South Africa. In a speech to the crew of the Emden, Pirow stated:

"Germany as a civilised state, is one of the chief exponents of our Western culture, which can be maintained only by white peoples, and preserved only by the united co-operation of all. Today, more than ever, when the rising tide of the coloured races is reaching higher and higher, the active help of a strong Germany is more than ever necessary. For us in South Africa the maintenance and spread of our white civilisation is a question of life and death. In this sense, I express the hope that Germany will again soon become a colonial power in Africa".

Pirow's speech at first attracted little attention, being only reported in the Cape Argus newspaper until the British journalist George Ward Price brought it up in an interview with Hitler for the Daily Mail newspaper. In response, Hitler stated: "Until it has been confirmed I should not like to pass any opinion. I will only say that if South Africa or any other government would offer to give us back any of our colonies we would accept them willingly". At that point, the speech became the subject of much debate both within South Africa and in Great Britain, where it was felt to be an offer to return Southwest Africa (modern Namibia) to Germany.

In the Foreign Office, it was believed that Hitler was "testing the weaker vessel first" as a gambit to force the British, the French and the Belgians to return the former German African colonies. Pirow denied in the South African parliament that the South African government was planning to return Southwest Africa, saying that he was only expressing the wish that Germany have a colonial empire in Africa again. According to the British embassy in Berlin which had learned of the contents of a meeting between Johan Paul van Limburg Stirum, the Dutch minister plenipotentiary to Germany, and Stefanus Gie, the South African minister plenipotentiary to Germany, Pirow's speech was not an off-hand statement, but rather the beginning of a new policy as the South African prime minister J. B. M. Hertzog felt that having Germany return as a colonial power in Africa was crucial "for the future safety of the white population". According to the source, Hertzog was planning to keep Southwest Africa and also felt that Britain should not return either Tanganyika (modern mainland Tanzania) or Cameroon to Germany. However, the source reported that for Hertzog it would be "ideal" if Germany could take over the Portuguese colonies in Africa, and that it was in this sense that Pirow's speech should be understood.

Pirow toured Europe in 1938 and claimed to offer Hitler a free role in Eastern Europe in return for allowing the Jews to leave Germany. During this tour he also met Benito Mussolini, António de Oliveira Salazar and Francisco Franco and became convinced that a European war was imminent, with Nazi victory assured. Pirow's Germanophilia was such that the family spoke only German at home and his daughter Else even caused a minor controversy in Britain in June 1939 when she told the Daily Express that the Pirows felt more German than South African.

Pirow supported Hertzog's calls for neutrality when war did arrive and followed his leader into the new Herenigde Nasionale Party (HNP). By September 1940 he had launched his own group New Order (Nuwe Orde) group within the HNP, backing a Nazi-style dictatorship. This group took its name from his 1940 New Order in South Africa pamphlet in which he embraced the ideology. The pamphlet ran through seven editions in its first year of existence.

Daniel François Malan initially tolerated the actions of the New Order, but soon came to see it as a divisive influence on the HNP and at the Transvaal party congress of August 1941, he forced through a motion ending the group's propaganda activities, particularly their insistence on an authoritarian single-party state. Pirow and 17 of his supporters in Parliament reconstituted as the New Order on 16 August, although they continued to be associated with the HNP and attend their caucus meetings. The group finally broke from the HNP altogether in 1942 after both Malan and Johannes Gerhardus Strijdom openly rejected the Nazis. With him, Pirow brought a sensational 15 MPs, comparable to Malan's breakout in 1934 into the purified National Party. Fearing an Afrikaner division, however, Pirow refused to run in the 1943 general election although a number of his fellow NO members did, all of them heavily defeated. Although Pirow continued to publish a newsletter until 1958, his political support dwindled with the end of the war, with the New Order essentially being subsumed by the Reunited National Party. With his career over, Pirow was left to return to his legal practice.

== Final years ==
Pirow was counsel for the defence of Dr Ernst Jokl (Note: Dr Ernst Jokl (1907-1997) was in 1942 the South African Government's newly appointed Director of Physical Education) and others when they were sued in the F. M. Alexander libel case in South Africa in 1944–1948, which Alexander won.

Having been removed from the political scene, largely by Malan's influence, Pirow became a friend of Sir Oswald Mosley and with him developed an idea for the division of Africa into exclusively black and white areas. The two met after Pirow read a copy of Mosley's book The Alternative and by 1947 they were in discussion over founding an anti-communist group to be known as the "enemies of the Soviet Union" (although this plan never reached fruition). Mosley publicly endorsed Pirow's African plan, as part of his Europe a Nation project, at a joint press conference in April 1948. The two co-operated during the early 1950s, with Pirow writing articles for the Union Movement journals Union and The European, some of which were reprinted in German magazine Nation Europa. By 1953 however Pirow had lost interest in Mosley due to his lack of real influence and instead began to co-operate with A. F. X. Baron's NATINFORM, which was largely hostile towards Mosley.

Pirow acted as a prosecutor for a time during the Treason Trial of 1956. Despite his Nazi past some admiration for him grew amongst the African National Congress defendants, with Nelson Mandela being said to have "developed a certain affection" for him, largely due to his politeness in referring to the accused as "Africans" rather than the customary (and usually derogatory) "natives". Upon his sudden death in October 1959 from a stroke, Mandela remarked; "Although we would benefit from his absence, we did not rejoice at his death", and posthumously thanked Pirow for donating "over hundred volumes" in preparatory evidence, greatly easing the financial burden on the defense. As Mandela summed it up, contrasting Pirow's right-wing intellect against Bram Fischer's for the Marxist left, fostering a dialectic atmosphere in the courtroom: "Despite Pirow's noxious political views, he was a humane man without the virulent personal racism of the government he was working for".

Apart from the trial, Pirow largely lived his post-political career in retirement, publishing several books on wildlife and adventure books for boys. He died of heart failure in Pretoria, Transvaal, Union of South Africa. He was cremated and his ashes are kept at his Valhalla Farm residence near Pilgrim's Rest.

Political offices
Preceded by Frederic Creswell	Minister of Defence (South Africa); 1933–1939	Succeeded by Jan Smuts

== Books and articles ==
- Crozier, Andrew (1988). Appeasement And Germany's Last Bid For Colonies. Oxford: Springer. ISBN 1349192554.
- Mouton, F.A. (2022). The Opportunist: The Political Life of Oswald Pirow, 1915-1959. Pretoria: Protea Boekhuis. ISBN 9781485311690.
