= Thomas Watt (politician) =

South African politician

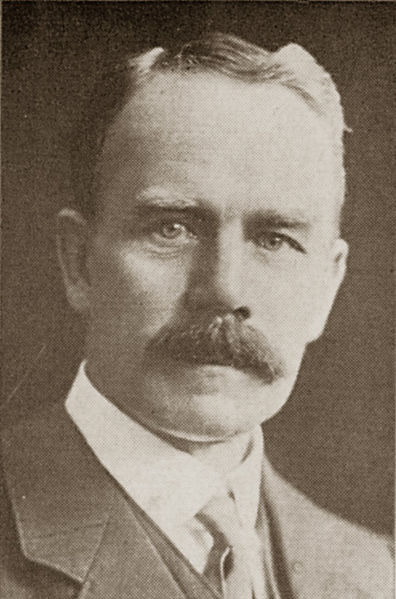
Thomas Watt

Sir Thomas Watt KCMG (1857–1947) was a South African politician and cabinet minister.

== Early life and education ==
Watt studied at the University of Glasgow and became a lawyer. In 1883, he emigrated to Natal and settled in Dundee.

== Political career ==
After serving Britain in the Anglo-Boer War, Watt was elected to the Natal Legislative Assembly and became minister of justice and education for the colony and, later from 1908 to 1909, he was appointed as a member of the National Convention which drafted the South African Act, enabling the Union in 1910. After the unification, he served as the minister of posts and public works in Louis Botha's cabinet. He later served in various capacities under Botha and Jan Smuts, holding positions such as minister of public welfare, home affairs and railways. His political career ended when the South African Party lost power in 1924.

== Recognition and honors ==
In 1907, King Edward VII approved his retention of the title "Honourable" for serving over three years as a member of the executive council of the Colony of Natal. He was appointed a Knight Commander of the Order of St Michael and St George (KCMG) in the 1912 New Year Honours, having been appointed a commander of the same order in the 1906 Birthday Honours. Thomas Watt lived to the age of 90, dying in 1947.

== Bibliography ==
- Rosenthal, Eric. 1978. Encyclopaedia of Southern Africa. Cape Town and Johannesburg: Juta and Company Limited.
