= F. S. Malan =

South African politician (1871–1941)

The Right Honourable F. S. Malan
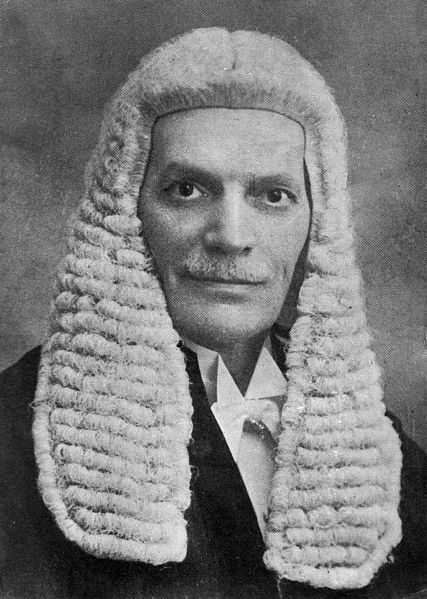
- F. S. Malan as President of the Senate, 1940

President of the Senate of South Africa
- In office January 1940 – 31 December 1941

Minister of Agriculture
- In office 20 March 1920 – 8 February 1921

Minister of Mines and Industry
- In office 1912 – 19 June 1924

Minister of Education
- In office 31 May 1910 – 8 February 1921

Minister of Agriculture of Cape Colony
- In office 1908–1910

Personal details
- Born: François Stephanus Malan; 12 March 1871 Leeuwenjacht, Paarl, Cape Colony
- Died: 31 December 1941 (aged 70)

François Stephanus Malan PC (12 March 1871 – 31 December 1941), usually called F. S. Malan or just F. S., was a South African politician.

Malan was the son of a farmer and was born in Leeuwenjacht, near Paarl, Cape Colony. As his name suggests, he was of Huguenot (French Protestants who fled to South Africa and were assimilated in the Afrikaner population) descent. His brother, Charl W. Malan, also entered politics. Malan was educated at Paarl Boys' High, Victoria College, Stellenbosch, the University of the Cape of Good Hope (where he studied science) and Christ's College, Cambridge, graduating from Cambridge in 1894 with an LLB. He returned to Cape Colony in 1895 and was admitted as an advocate. He never practised, however, and later that year became editor of Ons Land, the Cape's leading Dutch-language newspaper. He vigorously opposed Cecil Rhodes and the Progressive Party, precipitated the fall of William Philip Schreiner's government in 1902, and opposed Lord Milner. He was sentenced to a year's imprisonment during the South African War.

In 1900, Malan was elected to the Cape Assembly for the Afrikander Bond, of which he later became leader. In 1908 he resigned from Ons Land and was appointed minister of agriculture in John X. Merriman's government. He served until the creation of the Union of South Africa in 1910, when he was elected to the Union Parliament for the South African Party and joined Louis Botha's government as minister of education. He also became minister of mines (later mines and industries) in 1912. He remained in the government after Jan Smuts succeeded Botha in 1919. In April 1920 he also became minister of agriculture. He also acted as prime minister for eight months while Botha and Smuts were away at the Paris Peace Conference in 1919. After Smuts's government fell in 1924, Malan never again held government office. In 1927 he was elected to the Senate, becoming its president (speaker) in January 1940. He held this post until his death.

He was appointed to the Privy Council in the 1920 Birthday Honours, entitling him to the style "The Right Honourable".
