= Henry Burton (South African politician) =

South African lawyer and politician

The Right Honourable Henry Burton
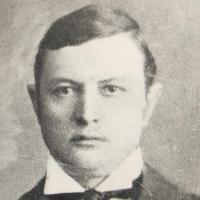

Minister of Finance

Minister of Railways and Harbours
- In office 1912–1920

Minister of Native Affairs
- In office 31 May 1910 – 1912
- Preceded by: None
- Succeeded by: J. B. M. Hertzog

Henry Burton, PC, KC (2 June 1866 – 25 December 1935) was a South African lawyer and politician who held several senior ministerial posts in the Cape Colony and in the Union of South Africa. A liberal, he was known as a strong defender of the non-racial Cape Qualified Franchise.

== Background ==
Born in Cape Town, Cape Colony in 1866, Henry Burton was the eldest son of Henry Burton, civil commissioner and resident magistrate. His great-uncle was the judge Sir William Burton. He claimed to be related to Robert Burton, author of The Anatomy of Melancholy.

Burton was educated at St Andrew's College, Grahamstown and the University of the Cape of Good Hope, before being called to the Bar by the Cape Colony Supreme Court in 1892. Burton practiced in Kimberley and became known for his defence of the Cape Colony's black population. Sol Plaatje, a founder of the African National Congress, wrote that Burton was "a negrophilist and did a lot for us while I was in Kimberly."

== Political career ==
In the 1898 Cape election, Burton stood in Barkly West for the Afrikaner Bond against Cecil Rhodes. In the election, he was supported by prominent figures, including Olive Schreiner, Sol Plaatje, and Tengo Jabavu. He lost the election, but filed an election petition against Rhodes, which he also lost.

During the Second Boer War, Burton worked as the legal aide of Sir Richard Solomon, Attorney-General of the Cape Colony. In 1902, he was elected to the Cape Legislative Assembly for the constituency of Albert. In 1907, he became a King's Counsel, and in 1908, he joined the government of John X. Merriman as Attorney-General of the Cape Colony.

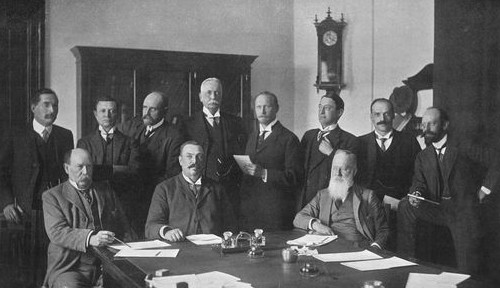
Botha's first cabinet, 1910. Burton is in the back row, second from the left.

In 1910, Burton was elected to the Union Parliament as member for Albert, and joined Louis Botha's Union Cabinet as Minister of Native Affairs, which was well-received by African opinion. As minister, Burton repealed a number of anti-African measures.

In 1912, the government was reshuffled, and Burton was replaced at Native Affairs by J. B. M. Hertzog, a supporter of racial segregation. Instead, he became Minister of Railways and Harbours, holding the post until 1920. In 1915, he was defeated in Albert, but was returned for Klip River in a by-election.

In addition of the Railways and Harbours portfolio, Burton was also acting Minister of Finance during the First World War from 1916 to 1917. The wartime loaf of bread, of an inferior quality, was nicknamed the 'Burton loaf'. In 1918, he attended the Imperial War Conference in London as a delegate; on his return, his ship, SS ''Galway Castle'', was torpedoed in the Bay of Biscay, and he was rescued from one of the open boats. Earlier, he had been torpedoed in the English Channel when travelling to England.

In 1920, Smuts appointed Burton Minister of Finance. In April 1921, faced with a large deficit, Burton introduced a drastic budget which contained increases in taxes and duties as well as cuts in civil service salaries, telling the House that "I am afraid it will probably shock the public, but it may be a healthy shock. It may be a very necessary shock to make people realise what the position really is."

In 1923, Burton attended the Imperial Conference and the Imperial Economic Conference. He was appointed to the Privy Council in 1924. Later the same year, he stood unsuccessfully to represent Ladismith in the general election. His austerity measures, and particularly his taxes on tobacco and patent medicines, were thought to have contributed to the government's defeat, particularly in rural seats.

== Later life ==
After his loss, Burton returned to his farm, Voorspoed, in Tokai. In 1928, Sol Plaatje asked him to run for Queenstown in the 1929 general election and promised him the support of native voters. In the end, Burton ran for Klip River as the South African Party candidate, but was defeated.

In retirement, he became the vice-president of the Non-Racial Franchise Association, set up to protect the Cape Qualified Franchise. In 1929, he was among the issuers of a manifesto in opposition to Hertzog's Native Representation Bill.

== Assessment ==
Writing in the Dictionary of South African Biography, N. G. Garson described Burton as "undoubtedly one of the abler members of the early Union governments" but "having an unfortunate and rather brusque public manner" as well as being viewed as arrogant, though he was admired by many who knew him personally. He was known as a powerful debater.

In appearance, Burton was described as "a small man, with a deep, powerful voice".

== Family ==
Burton was married to Helen Marie Kannemeyer, one of the founders of Kirstenbosch National Botanical Garden; they had nine children. A son was Flight Officer Percival Ross-Frames Burton, RAFVR, who was killed when he rammed his plane into a German plane during the Battle of Britain. Another son, Flight Lieutenant William Westbrooke Burton, RAFVR, was killed during a bombing raid on Cologne.
