= Minister of Bantu Administration and Development, and Bantu Education =

Structure of Bantu Administration

The Minister of Bantu Administration and Development, and Bantu Education is a former political position in apartheid South Africa. Until 1958, the position was titled the Minister of Native Affairs

== Office-holders ==
#	Name	Period	Party
Ministers of Native Affairs
1.	Henry Burton	31 May 1910 - 25 June 1912	SAP
2.	James Barry Munnik Hertzog	25 June 1912 - 20 December 1912	SAP
3.	Jacobus Wilhelmus Sauer	20 December 1912 - 23 September 1913	SAP
4.	Louis Botha	23 September 1913 - 3 September 1919	SAP
5.	Jan Smuts	3 September 1919 - 30 June 1924	SAP
6.	James Barry Munnik Hertzog	30 June 1924 - 19 June 1929	NP
7.	Ernest George Jansen	19 June 1929 - 30 March 1933	NP
8.	Pieter Gert Wessel Grobler	30 March 1933 - 3 June 1938	NP; 1934 UP
9.	Henry Allan Fagan	3 June 1938 - 6 September 1939	UP
10.	Deneys Reitz	6 September 1939 - 11 January 1943	UP
11.	Pieter Voltelyn Graham van der Byl	11 January 1943 - 4 June 1948	UP
12.	Ernest George Jansen	4 June 1948 - 19 October 1950	HNP
13.	Hendrik Verwoerd	19 October 1950 - 3 September 1958	HNP; 1951 NP

Name	Period	Title
Michiel Daniel Christiaan de Wet Nel	1958–1966	Minister of Bantu Administration and Development, and Bantu Education
Michiel Coenraad Botha	1966–1977	Minister of Bantu Administration and Development, and Bantu Education
Cornelius Petrus Mulder	January – November 1978	Minister of Plural Relations and Development
Piet Koornhof	1978–1984	Minister of Plural Relations and Development/Minister of Co-operation and Development
Gerrit Viljoen	1985–1988	Minister of Co-operation and Development
Stoffel van der Merwe	1989–1991	Minister of National Education and Training
Samuel Johannes de Beer	1991–1994	Minister of National Education and Training
