= Cabinet of Nelson Mandela =

Members of Nelson Mandela's government

Government of National Unity; Mandela Cabinet
- 1st Cabinet of the Republic of South Africa (since the 1994 election)
- 1994–1999
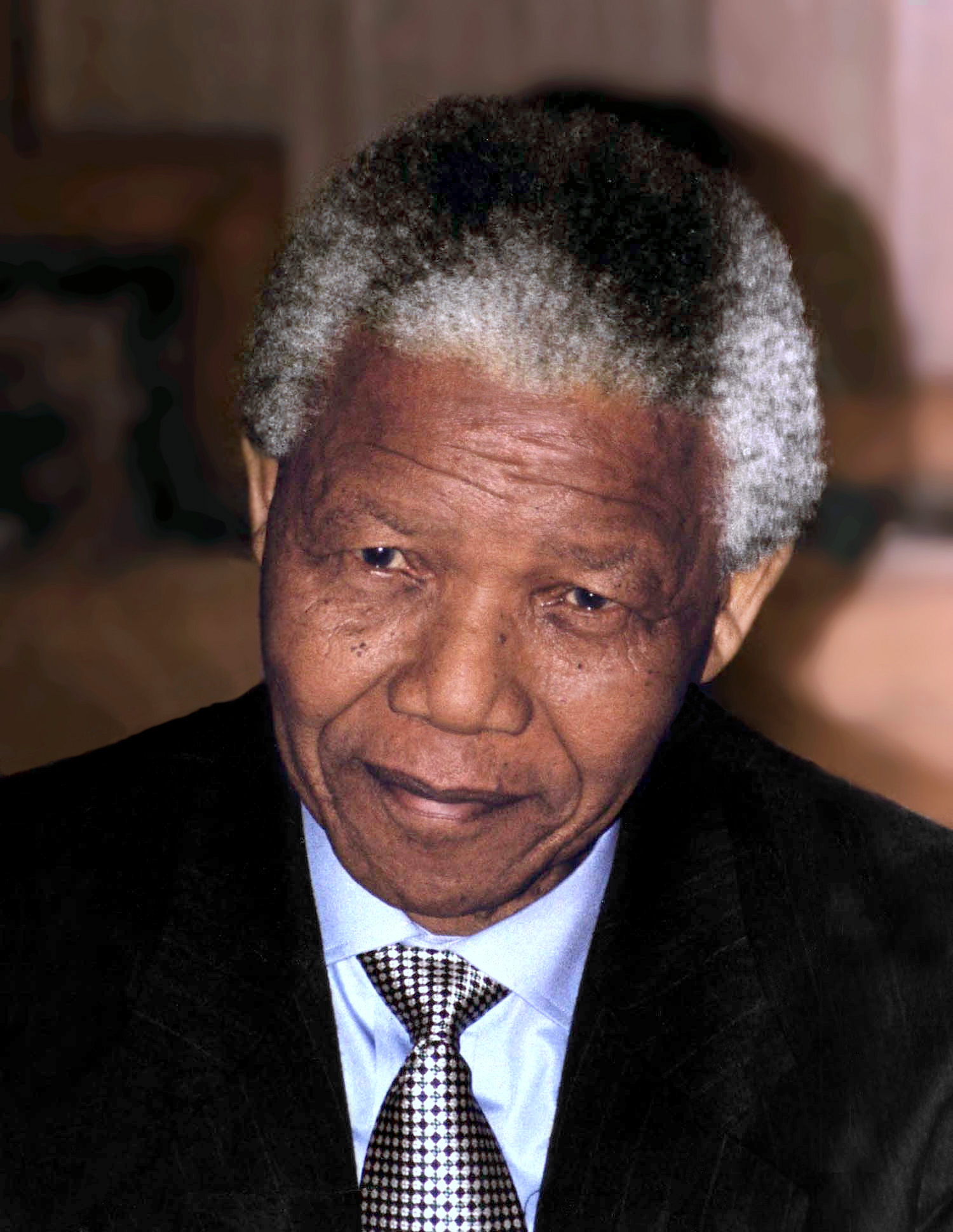
- Nelson Mandela (1994)
- Date formed: 10 May 1994
- Date dissolved: 14 June 1999 (5 years, 1 month and 4 days)

People and organisations
- President: Nelson Mandela
- Deputy President: Frederik de Klerk (until 1996); Thabo Mbeki
- No. of ministers: 27 ministers
- Member parties: African National Congress; National Party (until 1996); Inkatha Freedom Party
- Status in legislature: Majority (national unity)
- Opposition parties: Freedom Front (1994–1996); National Party (1996–1997); New National Party (1997–1999)
- Opposition leaders: Constand Viljoen (1994–1996); Frederik de Klerk (1996–1997); M. van Schalkwyk (1997–1999)

History
- Election: 1994 election
- Legislature term: First Parliament
- Predecessor: De Klerk (TEC)
- Successor: Mbeki I

Nelson Mandela took the oath as President of South Africa on 10 May 1994 and announced a Government of National Unity on 11 May 1994. The cabinet included members of Mandela's African National Congress, the National Party and Inkatha Freedom Party, as Clause 88 of the Interim Constitution of South Africa required that all parties winning more than 20 seats in National Assembly should be given representation in the cabinet. Upon its formation it comprised 27 ministers, with a further 13 deputy ministers.

== Background ==
In the election of 27 April 1994, the African National Congress (ANC) obtained the majority of seats in the National Assembly, and thus could form the government on its own. The two chief parties who made use of the provision for a Government of National Unity (GNU) were the National Party (NP) and the Inkatha Freedom Party (IFP), both of which obtained cabinet portfolios for their leaders and other members of parliament. President Nelson Mandela also invited other parties to join the cabinet, even though they did not obtain the minimum twenty seats in the National Assembly.

The aims of the GNU centred on governing by consensus and building peace while correcting the social and economic injustices left by the legacy of apartheid. It also oversaw the development of the final post-apartheid Constitution, which was carried out by the two chambers of parliament, the Senate and National Assembly.

On 8 May 1996 the final Constitution was adopted by the National Assembly and one day later, second Deputy President of the Republic F. W. de Klerk announced the withdrawal of his National Party from the GNU, with effect from 30 June. De Klerk said that the withdrawal was related to the need for a strong opposition to the ANC and that it was an "important step in the growing maturity and normalization of our young democracy".

The requirement for the GNU lapsed at the end of the first Parliament in 1999. Even so, the IFP continued to hold seats in the government, as minority partners, until the elections of 2004.

== Membership ==
Post	Minister	Image	Term		Party
President	Nelson Mandela		1994	1999	ANC
First Deputy President	Thabo Mbeki		1994	1999	ANC
Second Deputy President	Frederik de Klerk		1994	1996	NP
Minister of Agriculture and Land Affairs	Derek Hanekom MP		1996	1999	ANC
Minister of Land Affairs	Derek Hanekom MP		1994	1996	ANC
Minister of Agriculture	Kraai van Niekerk MP		1994	1996	NP
Minister of Arts, Culture, Science and Technology	Lionel Mtshali MP		1996	1999	IFP
Minister of Arts, Culture, Science and Technology	Ben Ngubane MP		1994	1996	IFP
Minister of Correctional Services	Ben Skosana MP		1998	1999	IFP
Minister of Correctional Services	Sipho Mzimela MP		1994	1998	IFP
Minister of Defence	Joe Modise MP		1994	1999	ANC
Minister of Education	Sibusiso Bengu MP		1994	1999	ANC
Minister of Posts and Telecommunications	Jay Naidoo MP		1996	1999	ANC
Minister of Posts and Telecommunications	Pallo Jordan MP		1994	1996	ANC
Minister of Environmental Affairs and Tourism	Pallo Jordan MP		1996	1999	ANC
Minister of Environmental Affairs and Tourism	Dawie de Villiers MP		1994	1996	NP
Minister of Finance	Trevor Manuel MP		1996	1999	ANC
Minister of Finance	Chris Liebenberg MP		1994	1996	None
Minister of Finance	Derek Keys MP		1994	1994	NP
Minister of Foreign Affairs	Alfred Nzo MP		1994	1999	ANC
Minister of General Affairs	John Mavuso MP		1996	1996	NP
Minister of Health	Nkosazana Dlamini-Zuma MP		1994	1999	ANC
Minister of Home Affairs	Mangosuthu Buthelezi MP		1994	1999	IFP
Minister of Housing	Sankie Mthembi-Mahanyele MP		1995	1999	ANC
Minister of Housing	Joe Slovo MP		1994	1995	ANC
Minister of Justice	Dullah Omar MP		1994	1999	ANC
Minister of Labour	Tito Mboweni MP		1994	1999	ANC
Minister of Minerals and Energy	Penuell Maduna MP		1996	1999	ANC
Minister of Minerals and Energy	Pik Botha MP		1994	1996	NP
Minister of Public Enterprises	Stella Sigcau MP		1994	1999	ANC
Minister of Public Works	Jeff Radebe MP		1994	1999	ANC
Minister of Welfare and Population Development	Geraldine Fraser-Moleketi MP		1996	1999	ANC
Minister of Welfare and Population Development	Patrick McKenzie MP		1996	1996	NP
Minister of Welfare and Population Development	Abe Williams MP		1994	1996	NP
Minister of Sport	Steve Tshwete MP		1994	1999	ANC
Minister of Transport	Mac Maharaj MP		1994	1999	ANC
Minister of Trade and Industry	Alec Erwin MP		1996	1999	ANC
Minister of Trade and Industry	Trevor Manuel MP		1994	1996	ANC
Minister of Safety and Security	Sydney Mufamadi MP		1994	1999	ANC
Minister without Portfolio (RDP)	Jay Naidoo MP		1994	1996	ANC
Minister of Constitutional Development and Provincial Affairs	Valli Moosa MP		1996	1999	ANC
Minister of Constitutional Development and Provincial Affairs	Roelf Meyer MP		1994	1996	NP
Minister of Water Affairs and Forestry	Kader Asmal MP		1994	1999	ANC

== Reshuffles ==
The first cabinet change occurred in mid-1994, when Derek Keys resigned as Minister of Finance and was replaced by Chris Liebenberg. Sankie Mthembi-Mahanyele became Minister of Housing in January 1995 after Joe Slovo died. In February 1996, Roelf Meyer resigned as Minister of Constitutional Development Provincial Affairs after being appointed secretary-general of the NP; the NP nominated John Mavuso to replace him in the cabinet, but in a newly created position as Minister of General Services.

On 28 March 1996, Mandela announced that Liebenberg himself had resigned and would be succeeded by Trevor Manuel; Liebenberg's deputy, Alec Erwin, in turn took over Manuel's portfolio as Minister of Trade and Industry. Later the same week, Pallo Jordan was fired as Minister of Posts and Telecommunications and was replaced by Jay Naidoo, formerly a minister without portfolio with responsibility for the Reconstruction and Development Programme office (subsequently closed).

The first and only major cabinet reshuffle was announced after de Klerk announced the NP's withdrawal from the cabinet, which would take effect on 30 June 1996. The NP's seats in the cabinet were ceded to the ANC, and in May, Mandela announced four new ministerial appointments: the shuffle saw Valli Moosa named as Minister of Constitutional Development and Provincial Affairs, Geraldine Fraser-Moleketi named as Minister of Welfare and Population Development, Penuell Maduna named as Minister of Minerals and Energy, and Pallo Jordan returned to the cabinet as Minister of Environmental Affairs and Tourism. Derek Hanekom's land affairs portfolio was expanded to become the Ministry of Agriculture and Land Affairs. The second deputy presidency, formerly held by de Klerk, was abolished, as was Mavuso's general services portfolio.

Peter Mokaba replaced Bantu Holomisa as Deputy Minister of Environmental Affairs and Tourism in August 1996, and Lionel Mtshali succeeded Ben Ngubane as Minister of Arts, Culture, Science and Technology in September 1996 after Ngubane resigned to join the KwaZulu-Natal government.

== See also ==
- History of the Cabinet of South Africa
- Negotiations to end apartheid
- 22nd Parliament of South Africa
- Third cabinet of Cyril Ramaphosa (Government of National Unity (GNU)) Since 2024
