= First cabinet of Thabo Mbeki =

First Mbeki Cabinet
- 2nd Cabinet of the Republic of South Africa (since the 1994 election)
- 1999–2004
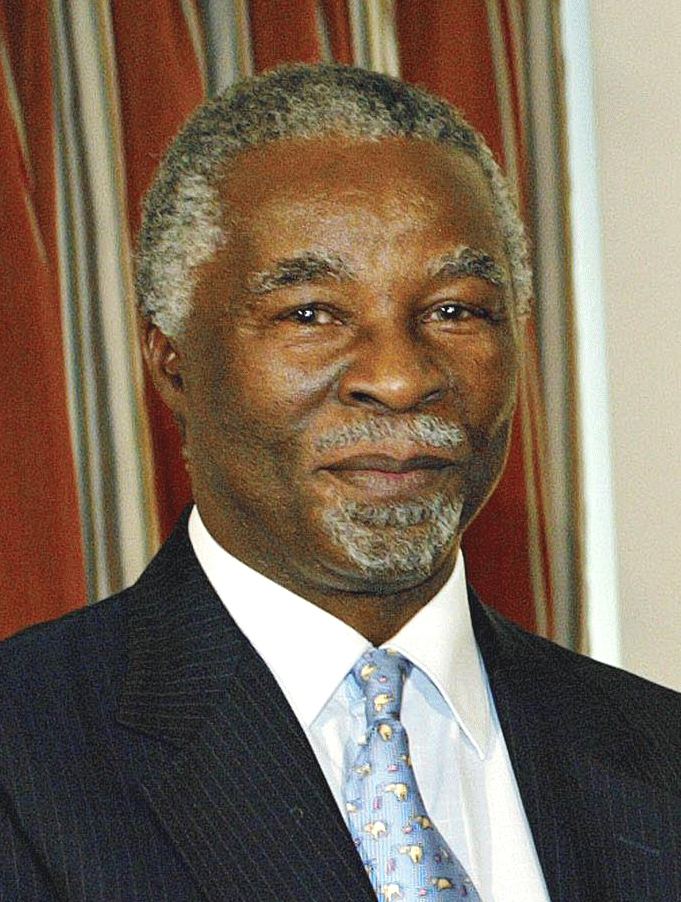
- Thabo Mbeki (2003)
- Date formed: 18 June 1999
- Date dissolved: 29 April 2004 (4 years, 10 months and 11 days)

People and organisations
- President: Thabo Mbeki
- Deputy President: Jacob Zuma
- No. of ministers: 27 ministers
- Member parties: African National Congress; Inkatha Freedom Party
- Status in legislature: Majority (coalition)
- Opposition parties: Democratic Party (until 2000); Democratic Alliance
- Opposition leaders: Tony Leon

History
- Election: 1999 election
- Legislature term: Second Parliament
- Predecessor: Mandela
- Successor: Mbeki II

The first cabinet of Thabo Mbeki was the cabinet of the government of South Africa from 18 June 1999 until 29 April 2004. It was established by President Mbeki after his ascension to the presidency in the 1999 general election, replacing the transitional Government of National Unity. It remained in office until the next general election in 2004. Comprising 27 ministers, it was dominated by the majority party, the African National Congress, although the Inkatha Freedom Party also held three positions.

== Establishment ==
After South Africa's second democratic general election in June 1999, the National Assembly of South Africa elected Thabo Mbeki to succeed Nelson Mandela as the President of South Africa. Mbeki had been the Deputy President of South Africa in Mandela's cabinet, which was a Government of National Unity formed by Mandela's African National Congress (ANC), the Inkatha Freedom Party (IFP), and, until 1996, the National Party. Mbeki announced his new cabinet on 17 June 1999.

The ANC had won a comfortable majority in the National Assembly and the Constitution of 1996 did not make any formal provision for power-sharing, but Mbeki opted informally to extend Mandela's Government of National Unity by maintaining IFP representation in the cabinet, in exchange for a similar form of power-sharing in Lionel Mtshali's KwaZulu-Natal Executive Council. Three cabinet posts were therefore held by members of the IFP, while the rest were held by the ANC.

Mbeki retained many of Mandela's ministers, though he increased the number of women ministers to eight of 27. The other major development in the cabinet announcement was the establishment of two new cabinet posts, the Minister of Intelligence Services and the Minister in the Presidency. The Guardian's Chris McGreal expected the first Minister in the Presidency, Essop Pahad, to become an "enforcer" in Mbeki's "super-presidency", and he did indeed become a powerful figure in Mbeki's national executive.

== Reshuffles ==
During the cabinet's five-year term, Mbeki did not effect any major cabinet reshuffles but instead made individual appointments on three occasions after two resignations and one death. The first such reshuffle was occasioned when Joe Nhlanhla, the Minister of Intelligence Services, suffered a debilitating stroke in 2000. In January 2001, Mbeki appointed Lindiwe Sisulu to replace him.

The second reshuffle occurred over a year later in May 2002, when Charles Nqakula was appointed as Minister of Safety and Security following the death of the incumbent, Minister Steve Tshwete.

In December 2002, at the ANC's 51st National Conference, Minister Sankie Mthembi-Mahanyele was elected to the full-time position of ANC Deputy Secretary General and consequently resigned from the cabinet in the New Year. In February 2003, Brigitte Mabandla was appointed to replace her as Minister of Housing.

Finally, the Minister of Transport, Dullah Omar, died in March 2004. Less than two months later the cabinet was dissolved after the April 2004 general election and replaced by Mbeki's second-term cabinet.

== List of ministers ==
Post	Minister	Term		Party
President of South Africa	His Excellency Thabo Mbeki	1999	2004	ANC
Deputy President of South Africa	His Excellency Jacob Zuma	1999	2004	ANC
Minister in the Presidency	The Hon. Essop Pahad	1999	2004	ANC
Minister of Agriculture and Land Affairs	The Hon. Thoko Didiza	1999	2004	ANC
Minister of Arts, Culture, Science and Technology	The Hon. Ben Ngubane	1999	2004	IFP
Minister of Correctional Services	The Hon. Ben Skosana	1999	2004	IFP
Minister of Defence	The Hon. Mosiuoa Lekota	1999	2004	ANC
Minister of Education	The Hon. Kader Asmal	1999	2004	ANC
Minister of Environmental Affairs and Tourism	The Hon. Valli Moosa	1999	2004	ANC
Minister of Finance	The Hon. Trevor Manuel	1999	2004	ANC
Minister of Foreign Affairs	The Hon. Nkosazana Dlamini-Zuma	1999	2004	ANC
Minister of Health	The Hon. Manto Tshabalala-Msimang	1999	2004	ANC
Minister of Home Affairs	The Hon. Mangosuthu Buthelezi	1999	2004	IFP
Minister of Housing	The Hon. Brigitte Mabandla	2003	2004	ANC
Minister of Housing	The Hon. Sankie Mthembi-Mahanyele	1999	2003	ANC
Minister of Intelligence Services	The Hon. Lindiwe Sisulu	2001	2004	ANC
Minister of Intelligence Services	The Hon. Joe Nhlanhla	1999	2000	ANC
Minister of Justice and Constitutional Development	The Hon. Penuell Maduna	1999	2004	ANC
Minister of Labour	The Hon. Shepherd Mdladlana	1999	2004	ANC
Minister of Minerals and Energy	The Hon. Phumzile Mlambo-Ngcuka	1999	2004	ANC
Minister of Posts, Telecommunications and Broadcasting	The Hon. Ivy Matsepe-Casaburri	1999	2004	ANC
Minister of Provincial and Local Government	The Hon. Sydney Mufamadi	1999	2004	ANC
Minister of Public Enterprises	The Hon. Jeff Radebe	1999	2004	ANC
Minister of Public Service and Administration	The Hon. Geraldine Fraser-Moleketi	1999	2004	ANC
Minister of Public Works	The Hon. Stella Sigcau	1999	2004	ANC
Minister of Safety and Security	The Hon. Charles Nqakula	2002	2004	ANC
Minister of Safety and Security	The Hon. Steve Tshwete	1999	2002	ANC
Minister of Social Development	The Hon. Zola Skweyiya	1999	2004	ANC
Minister of Sport and Recreation	The Hon. Ngconde Balfour	1999	2004	ANC
Minister of Trade and Industry	The Hon. Alec Erwin	1999	2004	ANC
Minister of Transport	Office vacant			
Minister of Transport	The Hon. Dullah Omar	1999	2004	ANC
Minister of Water Affairs and Forestry	The Hon. Ronnie Kasrils	1999	2004	ANC
