= Thembile Klaas =

South African politician

The Honourable Thembile Klaas MPP

Member of the Western Cape Provincial Parliament
- In office 3 February 2023 – 4 April 2024
- Succeeded by: Wandile Kasibe

Personal details
- Party: Economic Freedom Fighters
- Profession: Politician

Moses Thembile Klaas is a South African politician who served as a Member of the Western Cape Provincial Parliament from 2023 until 2024, representing the Economic Freedom Fighters (EFF). Klaas is the deputy provincial chairperson of the EFF in the Western Cape.

== Political career ==
Klaas was a councillor of the Drakenstein Local Municipality, representing the Economic Freedom Fighters. At the EFF's provincial conference in October 2022, Klaas was elected as the deputy provincial chairperson of the party in the Western Cape.

In January 2023, EFF MPPs Melikhaya Xego and Nosipho Makamba-Botya vacated their seats in the Western Cape Provincial Parliament after they unsuccessfully stood for re-election at the party's provincial conference in October 2022. Klaas and EFF provincial treasurer Aishah Cassiem were selected by the party to take up the two vacant seats in the provincial parliament and both were sworn in as members of the Western Cape Provincial Parliament on 3 February 2023.

On 4 April 2024, he resigned from the provincial parliament. He was succeeded by Wandile Kasibe on 12 April 2024.
