= Nosiviwe Mapisa-Nqakula =

South African politician (born 1956)

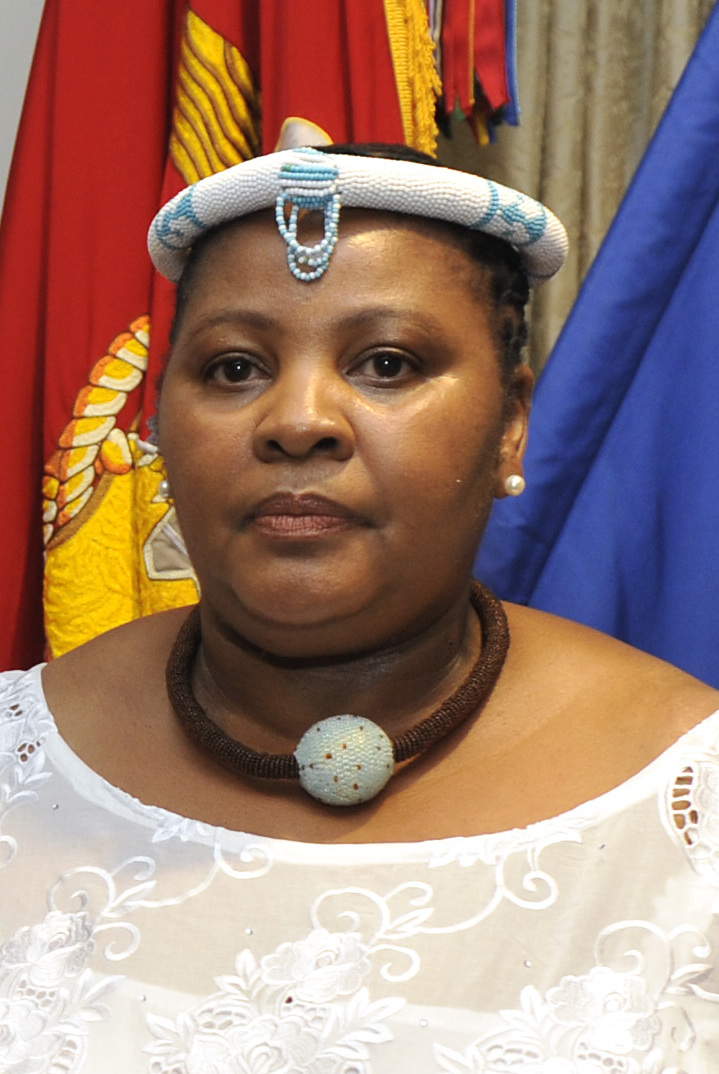
- Mapisa-Nqakula in 2012

7th Speaker of the National Assembly
- In office 19 August 2021 – 3 April 2024
- President: Cyril Ramaphosa
- Deputy: Lechesa Tsenoli
- Preceded by: Thandi Modise
- Succeeded by: Lechesa Tsenoli (acting); Thoko Didiza

President of the African National Congress Women's League
- In office 29 August 2003 – 6 July 2008
- Deputy: Mavivi Manzini
- Preceded by: Winnie Madikizela-Mandela
- Succeeded by: Angie Motshekga
Other offices 2001–2021
Member of the National Assembly of South Africa
In office 9 May 1994 – 3 April 2024
Minister of Defence and Military Veterans
In office 12 June 2012 – 5 August 2021
| President | Jacob Zuma; Cyril Ramaphosa |
| Deputy | Thabang Makwetla; Kebby Maphatsoe |
| Preceded by | Lindiwe Sisulu |
| Succeeded by | Thandi Modise |
Minister of Correctional Services
In office 11 May 2009 – 12 June 2012
| President | Jacob Zuma |
| Deputy | Hlengiwe Mkhize; Ngoako Ramatlhodi |
| Preceded by | Ngconde Balfour |
| Succeeded by | S'bu Ndebele |
Minister of Home Affairs
In office 29 April 2004 – 10 May 2009
| President | Thabo Mbeki; Kgalema Motlanthe |
| Deputy | Malusi Gigaba |
| Preceded by | Mangosuthu Buthelezi |
| Succeeded by | Nkosazana Dlamini-Zuma |
Deputy Minister of Home Affairs
In office 6 May 2002 – 28 April 2004
| President | Thabo Mbeki |
| Minister | Mangosuthu Buthelezi |
| Preceded by | Charles Nqakula |
| Succeeded by | Malusi Gigaba |
Chief Whip of the Majority Party
In office December 2001 – May 2002
| President | Thabo Mbeki |
| Preceded by | Tony Yengeni |
| Succeeded by | Nathi Nhleko |

Personal details
- Born: Nosiviwe Noluthando Mapisa; 13 November 1956 (age 69) Cape Town, Western Cape; Union of South Africa
- Party: African National Congress
- Spouse: Charles Nqakula

Nosiviwe Noluthando Mapisa-Nqakula (née Mapisa; born 13 November 1956) is a South African politician of the African National Congress (ANC). She was a cabinet minister from 2004 to 2021 and the Speaker of the National Assembly from 2021 to 2024. A former president of the ANC Women's League, she was an elected member of the ANC National Executive Committee between 2002 and 2022.

Raised in the Eastern Cape, Mapisa-Nqakula trained as a teacher and worked in youth development until 1984, when she left South Africa to join Umkhonto we Sizwe in exile. She returned to the country in 1990 and became a national organiser for the newly relaunched ANC Women's League; she was later its secretary-general from 1993 to 1997 under league president Winnie Madikizela-Mandela. She joined the National Assembly as a backbencher in the April 1994 general election and chaired Parliament's Joint Standing Committee on Intelligence from 1996 to 2001.

Her political rise accelerated during the presidency of Thabo Mbeki, with whom she was close. In December 2001, she was appointed Chief Whip of the Majority Party, and merely six months later she became Deputy Minister of Home Affairs under Minister Mangosuthu Buthelezi. She served as deputy minister until the April 2004 general election, after which she joined Mbeki's cabinet as minister in the same portfolio. Concurrently, she was the president of the ANC Women's League from August 2003 to July 2008.

After the April 2009 general election, President Jacob Zuma moved her to a new portfolio as Minister of Correctional Services, where she served until she was appointed Minister of Defence and Military Veterans in June 2012. She was retained in the latter position by Zuma's successor, President Cyril Ramaphosa, and remained in the ministry for almost nine years. She was sacked from Ramaphosa's cabinet on 5 August 2021 in the aftermath of severe civil unrest, and she was elected as Speaker on 19 August 2021.

After less than three years as Speaker, Mapisa-Nqakula resigned from the National Assembly on 3 April 2024 amid revelations that she was under investigation by the Investigating Directorate. The following day, she was charged with corruption and money laundering, accused of having accepted bribes while serving as Minister of Defence. She has since been released on bail and is awaiting trial.

== Early life and career ==
Born on 13 November 1956 in Cape Town, Mapisa-Nqakula grew up in the Eastern Cape in what she later described as a conservative family. She matriculated at Mount Arthur High School in Lady Frere and completed a primary teaching diploma at Bensonvale Teachers' College. Her first job was as a teacher, and she later worked in youth development; she was also a founding member of the East London Domestic Workers Association in 1982.

== Anti-apartheid activism ==
In 1984, with her husband Charles Nqakula, Mapisa-Nqakula left South Africa to enter exile with the anti-apartheid movement, undergoing military training with Umkhonto we Sizwe in Angola and the Soviet Union. She spent the next six years in exile in the political and military structures of the African National Congress (ANC), beginning with a post in the Soviet Union in 1985 and later representing the ANC Women's Section at the Pan-African Women's Organisation from 1988 to 1990.

In 1990, after the ANC was unbanned by the apartheid government to facilitate the negotiations to end apartheid, Mapisa-Nqakula returned to South Africa on the party's instructions to help rebuild its internal organisation. She worked for the newly relaunched ANC Women's League (ANCWL) as a national organiser and was also elected as a member's of the league's National Executive Committee in 1990. In December 1993, at the ANCWL's second national conference since its relaunch, she was elected to succeed Baleka Mbete as secretary-general of the ANCWL, serving under league president Winnie Madikizela-Mandela. She held that office until she was succeeded by Bathabile Dlamini in 1997, although she was a member of the group of 11 league leaders who resigned from their offices in February 1995 in protest of Madikizela-Mandela's leadership.

== National Assembly: 1994–2002 ==
While still serving as ANCWL secretary-general, Mapisa-Nqakula stood as an ANC candidate in the April 1994 general election and was elected to a seat in the National Assembly, the lower house of the South African Parliament. After two years as a backbencher, she succeeded Lindiwe Sisulu as chairperson of Parliament's Joint Standing Committee on Intelligence in September 1996. In August 2001, she was additionally appointed deputy chairperson of the ANC's new 22-member political committee in Parliament, chaired by Deputy President Jacob Zuma.

In December 2001, the ANC announced that it would appoint Mapisa-Nqakula to succeed fraud-accused Tony Yengeni as Chief Whip of the Majority Party. The Mail & Guardian reported that she had "lobbied long and hard" for the promotion. She soon oversaw a major reshuffle of the ANC's parliamentary caucus, and she was praised "for her energy and efficiency". During this period, she was labelled a "rising star" in politics, in part because both she and her husband were known to be close to, and highly loyal to, President Thabo Mbeki.

== Home Affairs: 2002–2009 ==
On 6 May 2002, President Mbeki announced that Mapisa-Nqakula would succeed her husband as Deputy Minister of Home Affairs in a cabinet reshuffle occasioned by the death of Steve Tshwete. She deputised Minister Mangosuthu Buthelezi of the opposition Inkatha Freedom Party, and she was viewed as a likely candidate to succeed him as minister if his party withdrew from the government. Indeed, after the 2004 general election, Mbeki appointed her as Minister of Home Affairs in his second-term cabinet, with Malusi Gigaba serving as her deputy.

Her ministry introduced the landmark Civil Unions Act of 2006, which legalised same-sex marriage. However, the Department of Home Affairs was a notoriously troubled portfolio. In January 2008, Patrick Chauke, the chairperson of the Portfolio Committee on Home Affairs, complained about the lack of improvement in the department's management. Chauke said that despite various interventions by Mapisa-Nqakula, including the recruitment of a team of turnaround experts, "For the past few years there had been this chaos we had to deal with in the department. We are sick and tired of having to deal with the same problems time and again."

Later the same year, Chauke's committee drafted a report for the Speaker of the National Assembly, Baleka Mbete, that asked Mbete or Mapisa-Nqakula to intervene in his extremely tense relationship with Mavuso Msimang, who was appointed as Mapisa-Nqakula's director-general in 2008. Mapisa-Nqakula's deputy, Gigaba, reportedly backed Chauke in this conflict; unlike Mapisa-Nqakula and Msimang, Gigaba and Chauke were political supporters of Jacob Zuma, Mbeki's principal political rival.

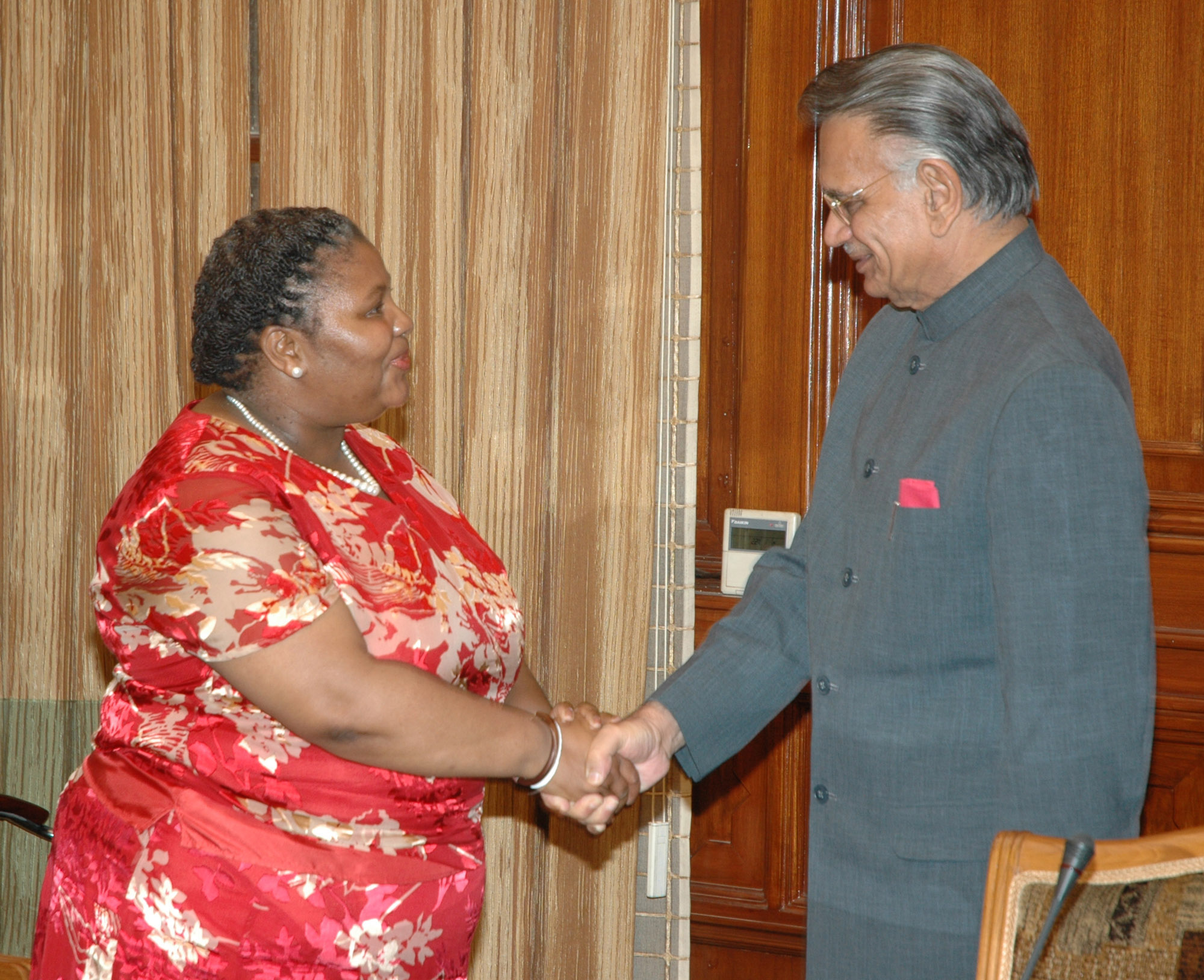
Mapisa-Nqakula with the Indian Home Affairs Minister, Shivraj Patil, in New Delhi, 6 September 2007

=== Immigration and xenophobia ===
Under Mapisa-Nqakula, the home affairs portfolio confronted a major increase in immigration to South Africa from neighbouring countries, especially due to ongoing political and economic crisis in Zimbabwe. Shortly after becoming minister, in September 2004, Mapisa-Nqakula appeared before the South African Human Rights Commission during hearings on xenophobia in South Africa; she acknowledged administrative problems in the asylum system and treatment of refugees, but said that she had set up an anti-xenophobia unit and was working to address other challenges. However, by March 2008, observers reported that her department was "in constant violation of the laws regulating processing of asylum-seekers" and that asylum-processing systems had "just about collapsed and are spinning out of control". At that time, a task team appointed by Mapisa-Nqakula to clear the backlog in asylum applications warned in its exit report that "we see the same chaos we first experienced when joining home affairs in September 2005, with a new backlog larger than the one that has just been effectively cleared... Whatever work we have done is being ignored or is already becoming undone."

Shortly after this assessment was published, a major wave of xenophobic violence broke out in Gauteng in May 2008. Blaming criminals for the violence, Mapisa-Nqakula committed at an early stage to protect foreign residents and promised that those affected would not be deported. She repeated this assurance on later occasions. However, the opposition Democratic Alliance (DA) was critical of Mapisa-Nqakula's role; its chief whip, Ian Davidson, urged her to "pull her head out of the sand" and acknowledge the true causes and extent of the violence. According to Davidson, Mapisa-Nqakula had a "long history of denial" about the extent of illegal immigration to South Africa; he held the government responsible for the crisis insofar as it had presided over "one of the largest human migrations of the last quarter-century, without any comprehensive plans on how to cope with the influx".

In December 2008, Mapisa-Nqakula said that she did not support stronger border control measures, explaining that, in her ministry, "Our emphasis is on facilitation of movement rather than tighter border control... then you know who is in the country and what they are doing." On 2 April 2009, in a move welcomed by human rights groups, she announced that the government would exempt all Zimbabwean citizens from visa requirements and grant them special residency permits allowing them to work inside South Africa; this policy was retained and expanded under the next administration.

=== Rise in the ANC ===
During her tenure as deputy minister and minister in the home affairs portfolio, Mapisa-Nqakula continued to rise through the ranks of the ANC, joining the party's National Executive Committee. Having formerly served as an ex officio and co-opted member of the committee, she was directly elected at the ANC's 51st National Conference in 2002; by number of votes received, she was ranked 37th of the 60 members elected to the committee. She was also elected to the influential National Working Committee.

The following year, at the ANCWL's fourth national conference at Nasrec in Johannesburg on 29 August 2003, Mapisa-Nqakula was elected as president of the ANCWL. She received 1,454 votes across 2,030 ballots, beating the other contender – league deputy president and acting president Thandi Modise – by 528 votes. Health minister Manto Tshabalala-Msimang had also been nominated for the position but declined to stand on the ballot. Mapisa-Nqakula was believed to be the preferred candidate of the national ANC leadership under Mbeki, as well as the preferred candidate of Bathabile Dlamini, who was re-elected as secretary-general at the same conference. However, she denied rumours that there had been a fierce contest between her and Modise, saying that they were "good comrades".

In her maiden speech as ANCWL president, Mapisa-Nqakula demanded 50 per cent representation for women in all spheres of government, but declined to support calls for South Africa to elect its first woman president, saying, "We believe in rallying behind the president we have. It's a tradition we grew up with in the ANC. We have a capable leader." Indeed, she went on to support Mbeki's bid to win a third term as ANC president in 2007.

At the party's hotly contested 52nd National Conference in Polokwane in December 2007, Mbeki lost to his former deputy, Jacob Zuma, but Mapisa-Nqakula was re-elected to the newly enlarged National Executive Committee, ranked 68th of 80. She was not re-elected to the National Working Committee. She stepped down as ANCWL president when her term ended on 6 July 2008, ceding the office to Angie Motshekga.

== Correctional Services: 2009–2012 ==
Pursuant to the next general election in April 2009, newly elected President Jacob Zuma appointed Mapisa-Nqakula to his cabinet as Minister of Correctional Services, initially with Hlengiwe Mkhize as her deputy. Mapisa-Nqakula was one of only a few Mbeki supporters who outlasted the change of government, but observers noted that she was "handed a department left in a dire state by outgoing minister, Ngconde Balfour".

She took office amid ongoing public controversy about Schabir Shaik's release from prison, and she conceded in December 2009 that the country's medical parole framework required improvement. Her ministry subsequently introduced the Correctional Matters Amendment Act to reform the framework. During her brief three-year tenure in the correctional services portfolio, the Mail & Guardian said that she remained popular with her colleagues; the same newspaper also commended her for appointing Tom Moyane as National Commissioner for Correctional Services.

== Defence and Military Veterans: 2012–2021 ==
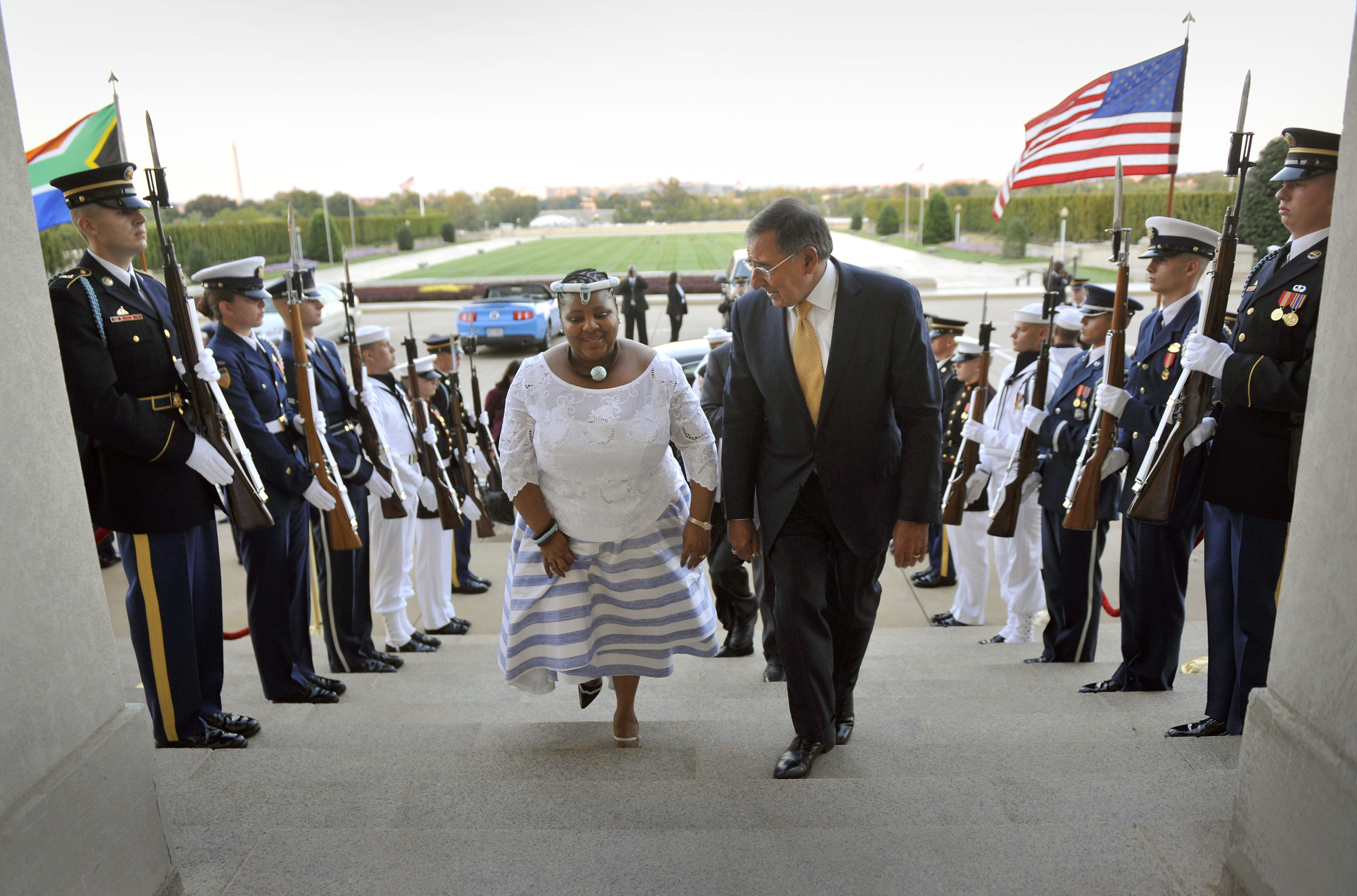
United States Secretary of Defense Leon Panetta hosts Mapisa-Nqakula at the Pentagon, 12 September 2012

On 12 June 2012, President Zuma announced a cabinet reshuffle in which Mapisa-Nqakula was appointed as Minister of Defence and Military Veterans. She remained in that office for almost nine years, serving through the remainder of Zuma's presidency and gaining reappointment in the first and second cabinets of President Cyril Ramaphosa, who succeeded Zuma in 2018. Throughout this period, she remained a member of the ANC National Executive Committee: at the party's 53rd National Conference in December 2012, she was re-elected ranked 17th and returned to the National Working Committee; and at the 54th National Conference in December 2017, she was re-elected ranked 53rd.

=== Procurement of VVIP jets ===
At an early stage in her tenure, Mapisa-Nqakula attracted media attention for reversing plans put in place by her predecessor, Lindiwe Sisulu, to lease new aircraft for use by government VVIPs, including the president and deputy president. A preliminary agreement with Boeing was allowed to expire, with Mapisa-Nqakula suggesting that the expiry might be fortuitous because "the aircraft being negotiated was not necessarily what the defence force would have advised us to buy"; and she went to court to challenge another contract with AdoAir, claiming that the award process had not complied with the Public Finance Management Act.

During the same period, she was involved with a public row with her predecessor over a related matter: in October 2012, in response to a parliamentary question from David Maynier, she reported that Sisulu had taken 203 private flights, at a cost of over R40 million to the South African Air Force, between 2009 and 2012. Sisulu strongly denied this claim, leading to a series of mutual public recriminations that continued as late as March 2014; Sisulu threatened to sue Mapisa-Nqakula and ultimately laid a formal complaint against her with Parliament.

At the end of Mapisa-Nqakula's first six months in office, the Mail & Guardian admired her approach, saying that she had "inherited a desk that must have been groaning under the weight of unresolved issues left behind by Lindiwe Sisulu" and that her "willingness to feed Sisulu to the parliamentary wolves" on her use of military aircraft had established her as "tough enough for the job" and as willing to be responsive to Parliament. However, new plans to lease aircraft for VVIPs caused intermittent controversy over the next few years. The Mail & Guardian complained in 2015 that "Mapisa-Nqakula seemed to be mostly in the business of justifying which planes the president and his deputy use to fly around the world, while considering the purchase of newer and shinier VVIP planes in her spare time", thus detracting attention from the substantive issues under her portfolio.

=== Waterkloof Air Base landing ===
Mapisa-Nqakula was Minister of Defence on 30 April 2013, when, in a serious security breach, the controversial Gupta family landed a private plane at the Waterkloof Air Force Base, apparently delivering their acquaintances to a family wedding at Sun City. South African law suggested that a plane could not have landed at the base without Mapisa-Nqakula's permission. In the days after the landing, the Mail & Guardian reported that Mapisa-Nqakula was under serious political pressure, including from inside the ANC, and that President Zuma had ordered her to return from a working trip in Addis Ababa, Ethiopia to attend urgent meetings on the matter. The opposition Freedom Front Plus (FF+) demanded that Mapisa-Nqakula should "provide answers" about the incident, and the ANC agreed: ANC spokesperson Jackson Mthembu called for an explanation from the South African National Defence Force (SANDF), while ANC secretary-general Gwede Mantashe said on Radio 702 that, "We will be speaking to the Minister directly to get answers of the logic behind this. To us it doesn't make sense."

In a statement, SANDF said that it had denied a request by a Gupta associate for authorisation to use the air base. According to Justice Minister Jeff Radebe, a subsequent ministerial investigation confirmed that neither SANDF nor Mapisa-Nqakula had authorised the landing, finding instead that it had come about by "name dropping": Gupta associates had apparently "dropped" Mapisa-Nqakula's name, along with that of the president and of transport minister Ben Martins. In July 2017, on the basis of the Gupta Leaks, the Sunday Times reported that Gupta associates had received access to confidential military charts, including maps of the base and information on its radio and navigation frequencies, in advance of the landing. The DA said that it would insist that "Mapisa-Nqakula must come before Parliament to explain this outrageous access the Guptas has had to our country's military services".

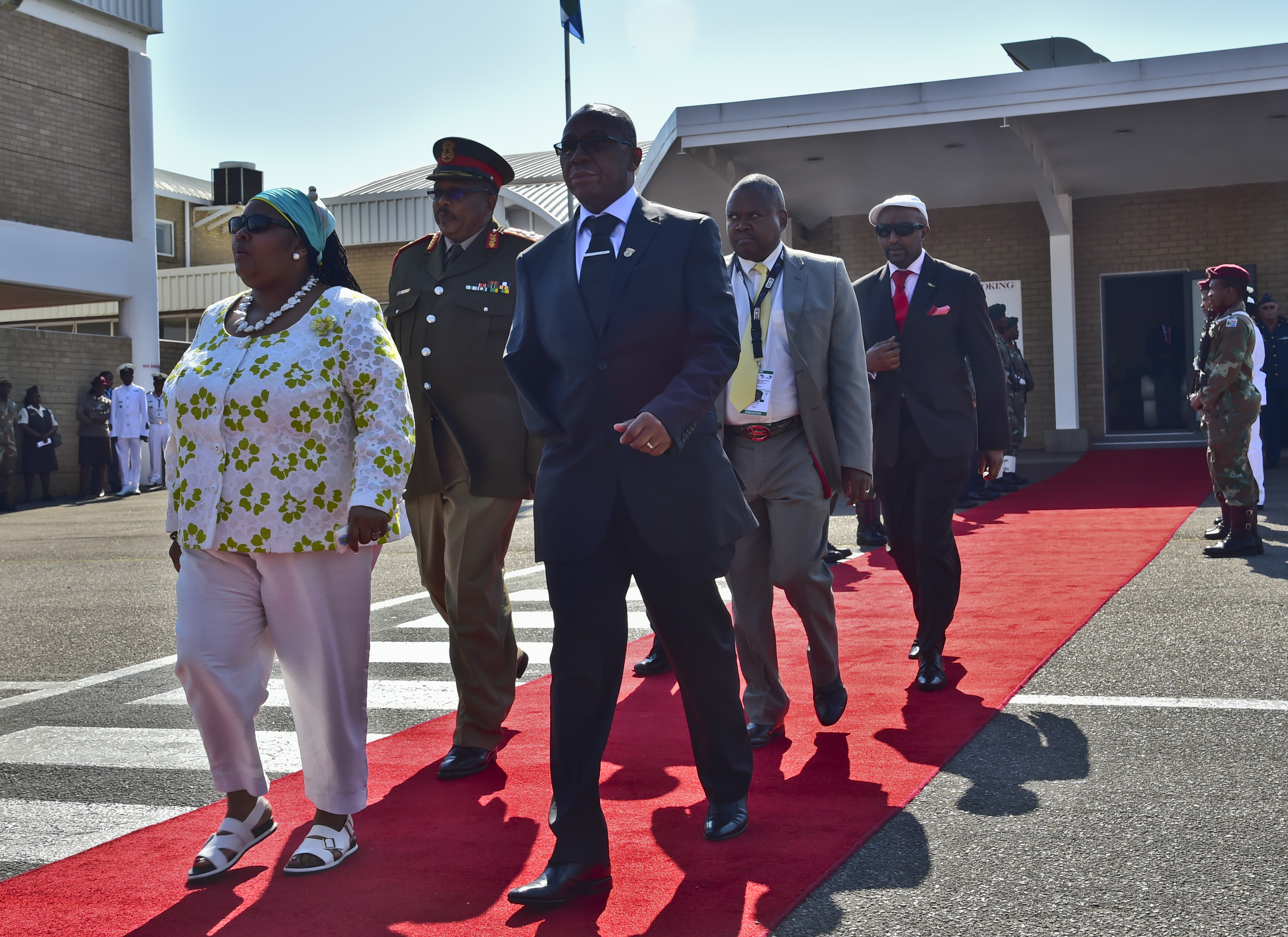
Mapisa-Nqakula at the Waterkloof Air Force Base for the Africa Aerospace and Defence Expo, 17 September 2014

=== Major troop deployments ===
On 31 December 2012, President Zuma sent Mapisa-Nqakula to assess the situation in the Central African Republic (CAR), where South African troops were stationed under a bilateral agreement and where a civil war had broken out. The following week, he announced a major SANDF deployment to the CAR as part of a campaign to support stability there. Press questioned the motives behind the deployment, suggesting that the government sought to protect ANC-linked business interests and the regime of François Bozizé. Mapisa-Nqakula was adamant that the deployment served the South African national interest, and she accused opposition parties of exploiting South African deaths – 13 died at the Battle of Bangui – for political gain ahead of the 2014 general election. She later defended SANDF against reports that South African troops had killed child soldiers in the CAR, saying, "If our soldiers were attacked by children they were correct to defend themselves. If a child shoots at you, are you going to wave your hands, give him a sweetie, blow kisses?" She announced in April 2013 that South African troops would withdraw.

Two years later, SANDF troops were deployed inside South Africa following renewed xenophobic violence in Gauteng and KwaZulu-Natal in April 2015. Announcing the deployment, Mapisa-Nqakula suggested that the instability might be fostered by external forces, warning of "people who have their own agendas of destroying the state and the government of the republic of SA". After another spate of xenophobic riots in Johannesburg in September 2019, Mapisa-Nqakula argued in a parliamentary debate that the incidents were "mostly acts of criminality irrespective of the nationality of those involved", rather than acts of xenophobia; she argued for responding by reviving "the voice of the moral regeneration movement". Such remarks were criticised as fuelling xenophobia denialism.

SANDF troops were also deployed to assist the police with public-order policing during the COVID-19 pandemic: 2,820 troops were deployed at the outset of the lockdown in March 2020 and all available personnel – including reserve and auxiliary forces – were put on standby with authorisation to deploy as of April 2020. Although the deployment was welcomed by politicians across the political spectrum, the Mail & Guardian said at the end of the year that it had been "disastrous". 214 misconduct complaints were laid against SANDF members during the lockdown, including one pertaining to the killing of Collins Khosa in Alexandra.

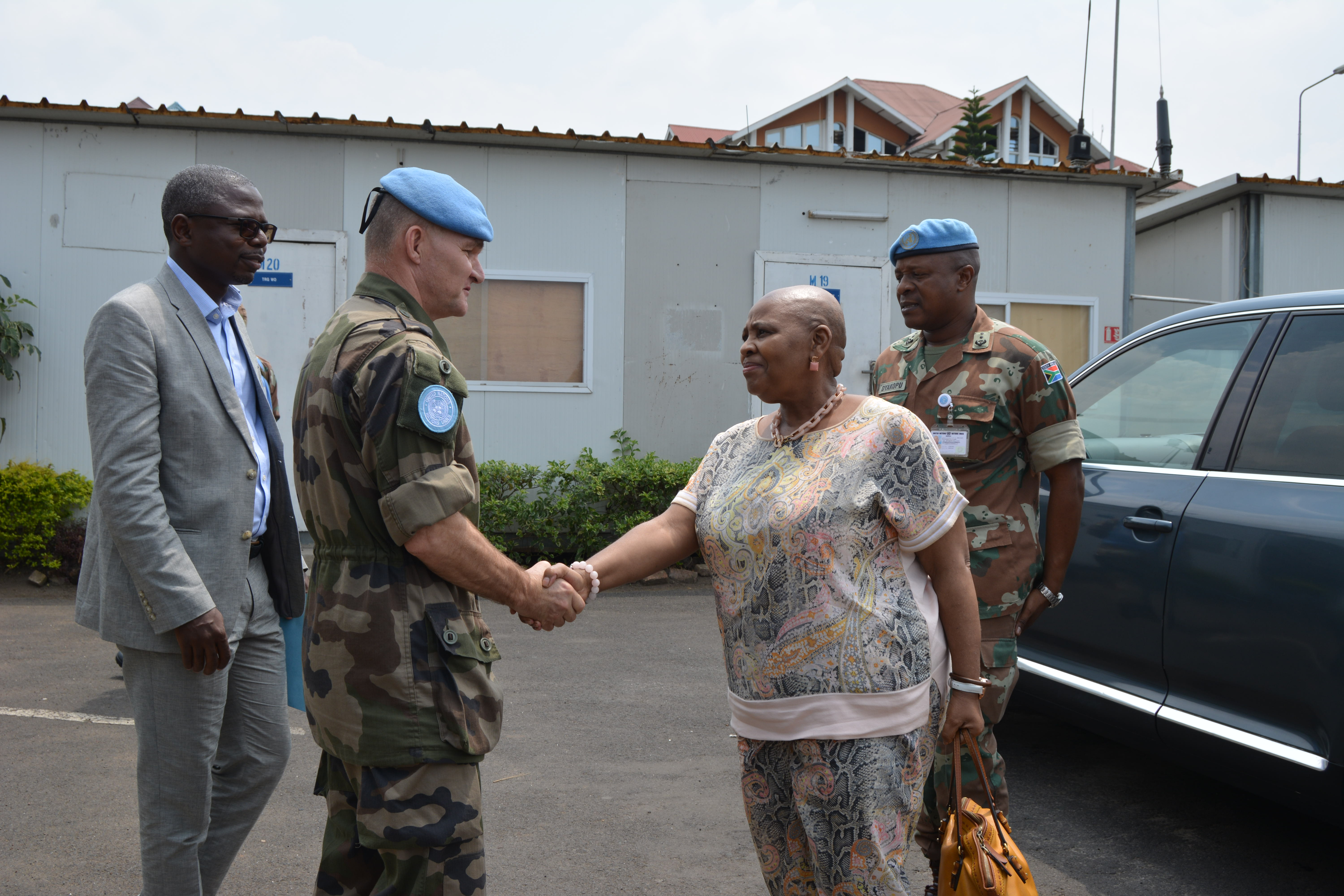
Mapisa-Nqakula with commanders in Goma during an inspection of the South African contingent of MONUSCO, 8 March 2017

=== Use of military aircraft ===
On several occasions, Mapisa-Nqakula attracted controversy for her use of military aircraft. First, in July 2013, she travelled in an air force helicopter to Tlokwe, North West to meet with local ANC members on the president's behalf; she accepted their memorandum to Zuma, which demanded political action be taken against their former mayor. The DA accused Mapisa-Nqakula of abusing state resources to conduct party-political business, thus contravening the ministerial handbook and appearing to "treat the South African Air Force as the ANC's own airborne taxi service". The South African National Defence Union also strongly condemned the trip, calling it a "poor show of leadership and outright lawlessness". Mapisa-Nqakula's spokesperson said that the trip qualified as government business, pertaining to "governance issues" and "the ability of government to function" in Tlokwe, and that she had taken the helicopter because her arrival was urgent in resolving a "potentially explosive situation".

In a separate incident, in May 2016, the Sunday Times reported that Mapisa-Nqakula had used an air force jet to "smuggle" a young Burundian woman into South Africa in 2014. The woman, Michelle Wege, was a friend of Mapisa-Nqakula's family who had been arrested at Kinshasa International Airport for attempting to travel using fraudulent documents. Mapisa-Nqakula's sister, Nosithembele Mapisa, was the deputy ambassador in Burundi at the time and was suspended by the ambassador, Oupa Monareng, on suspicion of having arranged the false passport under which Wege was arrested. After the arrest, Mapisa-Nqakula had intervened, writing to the South African Ambassador in the Congo and then, on 28 January 2014, flying from the Waterkloof Air Force Base to the Congo to fetch Wege. Mapisa-Nqakula denied having abused state resources, pointing out that she had flown with Wege from the Congo to Addis Ababa, where she was in any case scheduled to appear on a working visit to an African Union conference. She also said that she had rescued Wege from an abusive father, who had confiscated her passport, and that "I'd do it again if I had to." Wege's father denied that he had been abusive and said that his daughter had been in a romantic relationship with Mapisa-Nqakula's deceased son. The DA said that it would lay criminal charges against Mapisa-Nqakula, alleging that she had breached the Immigration Act by bringing Wege into the country, and the Mail & Guardian criticised Mapisa-Nqakula for having been "defiantly unapologetic" about an incident "which gave every appearance of having been a flagrant breaking of the law".

Finally, and perhaps most controversially, on 8 and 9 September 2020, Mapisa-Nqakula transported an ANC delegation to and from Harare, Zimbabwe, for a meeting with leaders of the Zimbabwean ruling party, Zanu-PF. They travelled on ZS-NAN, a Dassault Falcon-900B owned by the air force and allocated for VIPs, and the delegation included ANC secretary-general Ace Magashule as well as Lindiwe Zulu, Nomvula Mokonyane, Enoch Godongwana, Tony Yengeni, and Dakota Legoete. The DA accused the ANC of "gross abuse of government resources" for party-political purposes, and the Organisation Undoing Tax Abuse called for "stern corrective action". A spokesperson for the Department of Defence explained that the ANC's visit to Zimbabwe coincided with a working visit by Mapisa-Nqakula in her capacity as minister; she had apparently been scheduled to meet her Zimbabwean counterpart to discuss SADC matters. President Ramaphosa confirmed that he had authorised Mapisa-Nqakula's ministerial visit to Harare, but asked her to provide him with a report setting out the circumstances of the flight.

Two weeks later, Ramaphosa said that he had concluded that Mapisa-Nqakula had contravened the executive members ethics code and had "failed to adhere to legal prescripts warranting care in use of state resources", in an "error of judgment... not in keeping with the responsibilities of a minister of Cabinet". He issued her with a formal reprimand, docked her ministerial salary for three months, and instructed her to ensure that the ANC reimbursed the state for the costs of the flight. The acting Public Protector, Kholeka Gcaleka, agreed with Ramaphosa's assessment, reporting in September 2022 that Mapisa-Nqakula's conduct "constituted an improper advantage and or unlawful enrichment to the ANC". Mapisa-Nqakula sent the ANC an invoice for R105,000 to cover the party's share of the flight costs.

=== Corruption allegation ===
In April 2021, Bantu Holomisa of the opposition United Democratic Movement asked the Joint Standing Committee on Defence to investigate allegations, emanating from an unidentified whistleblower, that Mapisa-Nqakula had received cash and gifts to the value of R5 million from an unnamed SANDF contractor between 2017 and 2019. Mapisa-Nqakula denied the allegation and challenged Holomisa to approach law enforcement agencies to pursue the case.

The parliamentary committee agreed to probe Holomisa's allegation and established a subcommittee that was tasked with doing so. However, Holomisa's whistleblower declined to submit an affidavit to the committee, and the subcommittee unanimously agreed to drop the inquiry when its mandate expired on 31 August 2021. Holomisa referred the matter to law enforcement – as Mapisa-Nqakula had encouraged him to – and Mapisa-Nqakula ultimately faced related criminal charges in 2024.

=== 2021 civil unrest ===
In July 2021, serious civil unrest broke out in Gauteng and KwaZulu-Natal. Although Mapisa-Nqakula said on 10 July that "I don't think we have reached a point where SANDF should be dragged into what is happening", troops were deployed within two days of her statement. In the aftermath, Mapisa-Nqakula contradicted Ramaphosa's characterisation of the unrest as an insurrection, telling the Joint Standing Committee on Defence that it was in fact "a wave of crime". The acting Minister in the Presidency, Khumbudzo Ntshavheni, publicly criticised Mapisa-Nqakula, saying that "the facts do not support Mapisa-Nqakula's comment", and Mapisa-Nqakula backtracked and agreed that "it was indeed an attempted insurrection".

The defence ministry and other security cluster bodies were criticised for their slow response to the unrest, including for the slow progress of troop deployments. Appearing at the Human Rights Commission's inquiry into the events, Mapisa-Nqakula said that the military response was obstructed by a lack of cooperation and intelligence-sharing from officials in KwaZulu-Natal, including the provincial police commissioner, lieutenant general Nhlanhla Mkhwanazi. Mkhwanazi strongly denied this allegation in his own testimony, saying that he had called for military intervention at an early stage and strongly implying that Mapisa-Nqakula had perjured herself before the commission. He also said that she had lied to the public about the number of soldiers on the ground on 15 July, inflating the number nearly two-fold.

On 5 August 2021, President Ramaphosa announced a cabinet reshuffle that included the sacking of Mapisa-Nqakula and her state security counterpart, Ayanda Dlodlo. He said in his cabinet announcement that "our security services were found wanting in several respects" during the unrest. Thandi Modise, until then the Speaker of the National Assembly, was appointed to succeed Mapisa-Nqakula, who Ramaphosa said would be appointed to a new position elsewhere.

== Speaker of the National Assembly: 2021–2024 ==
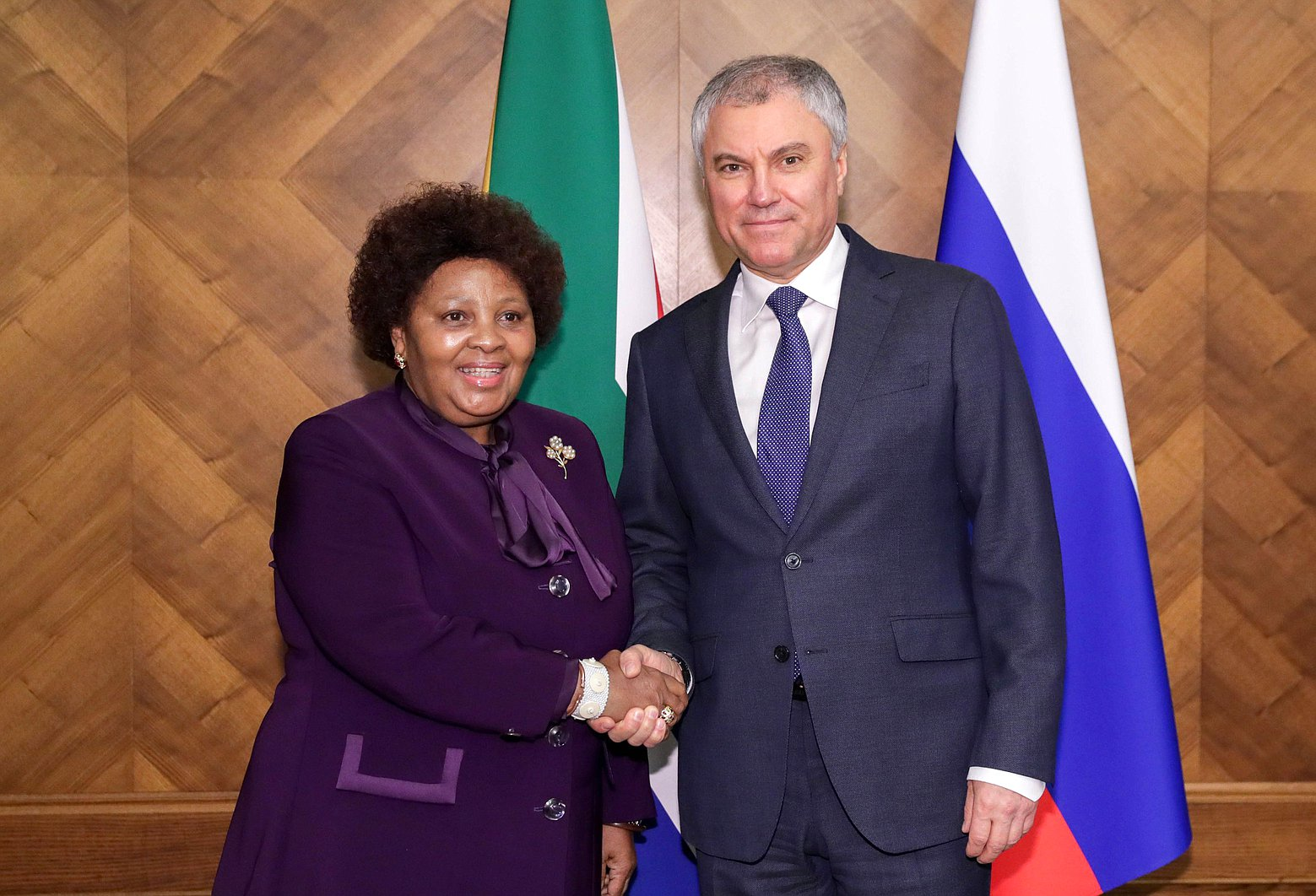
Mapisa-Nqakula in Moscow with Vyacheslav Volodin, the Chairman of the State Duma, 17 March 2023

Shortly after the reshuffle, the ANC announced that Mapisa-Nqakula was its preferred candidate to succeed Modise as Speaker of the National Assembly. On 19 August 2021, she was elected to that office, receiving 199 votes against the 82 votes for the opposition candidate, Annelie Lotriet of the DA. The Economic Freedom Fighters (EFF) boycotted the vote, and the FF+ and African Christian Democratic Party both expressed disappointment in the ANC's choice. The DA's Natasha Mazzone said her nomination made "a complete mockery of parliament and the constitution" and was "just an example of the ANC recycling an underperforming minister".

During her tenure as speaker, Mapisa-Nqakula presided over several historic events in the sixth democratic Parliament, including moves to impeach Ramaphosa over the Phala Phala scandal, which failed after Mapisa-Nqakula denied opposition petitions to allow a secret ballot, and the January 2022 fire at the Houses of Parliament. She also presided over the National Assembly's response to the findings of the Zondo Commission, which implicated several members of the executive and legislature in serious misconduct and corruption; Siviwe Gwarube, the deputy chief whip of the DA, accused Mapisa-Nqakula of evasiveness and undue delay in formulating the parliamentary response.

In March 2023, during the Russian invasion of Ukraine, she led a delegation to a parliamentary conference in Moscow.

=== 2023 State of the Nation Address ===
On 9 February 2023, during President Ramaphosa's annual State of the Nation Address at Cape Town City Hall, Mapisa-Nqakula ordered several Members of Parliament to leave the chamber for disrupting the president's speech by heckling him and raising a series of points of order. Vuyo Zungula, the leader of the African Transformation Movement, was the first to be told to leave; several minutes later, in an escalation, Mapisa-Nqakula asked armed security forces to enter the chamber to remove members of the EFF, who appeared to be approaching the stage where the president stood. Mapisa-Nqakula later explained, "rules or no rules here was a situation my common sense tells me that a president is sitting here... I asked people politely to leave the house and instead of leaving the house they climbed the stage. It immediately threatens the security of the president."

The following week, EFF leader Julius Malema announced that his party had lodged a motion of no confidence in Mapisa-Nqakula as speaker. He argued that her conduct during the State of the Nation Address

has disqualified her as a legitimate Speaker of Parliament. The Speaker referred to members of this house as animals and violated the Constitution and the Rules of the National Assembly when she allowed armed police to invade Parliament... The police must never be allowed inside the chamber because that is where the executive is held accountable and those who are in power, if they do not have answers, may be tempted to use the security forces to intimidate those who are holding them accountable.

Amos Masondo, the chairperson of the National Council of Provinces, disputed that Mapisa-Nqakula had indeed called EFF members "animals"; the unrevised Hansard recorded her as using the word phumani, meaning "get out". The EFF's motion was debated on 22 March 2023 and was defeated in a landslide, with 234 votes against the motion, 42 in favour, and 73 abstaining. All members of the ANC majority opposed the motion, while the DA, the largest opposition party, abstained; the DA's Siviwe Gwarube explained that the party did not support the motion because it "does not even scratch the surface of why you [Mapisa-Nqakula] are ill-suited for this role".

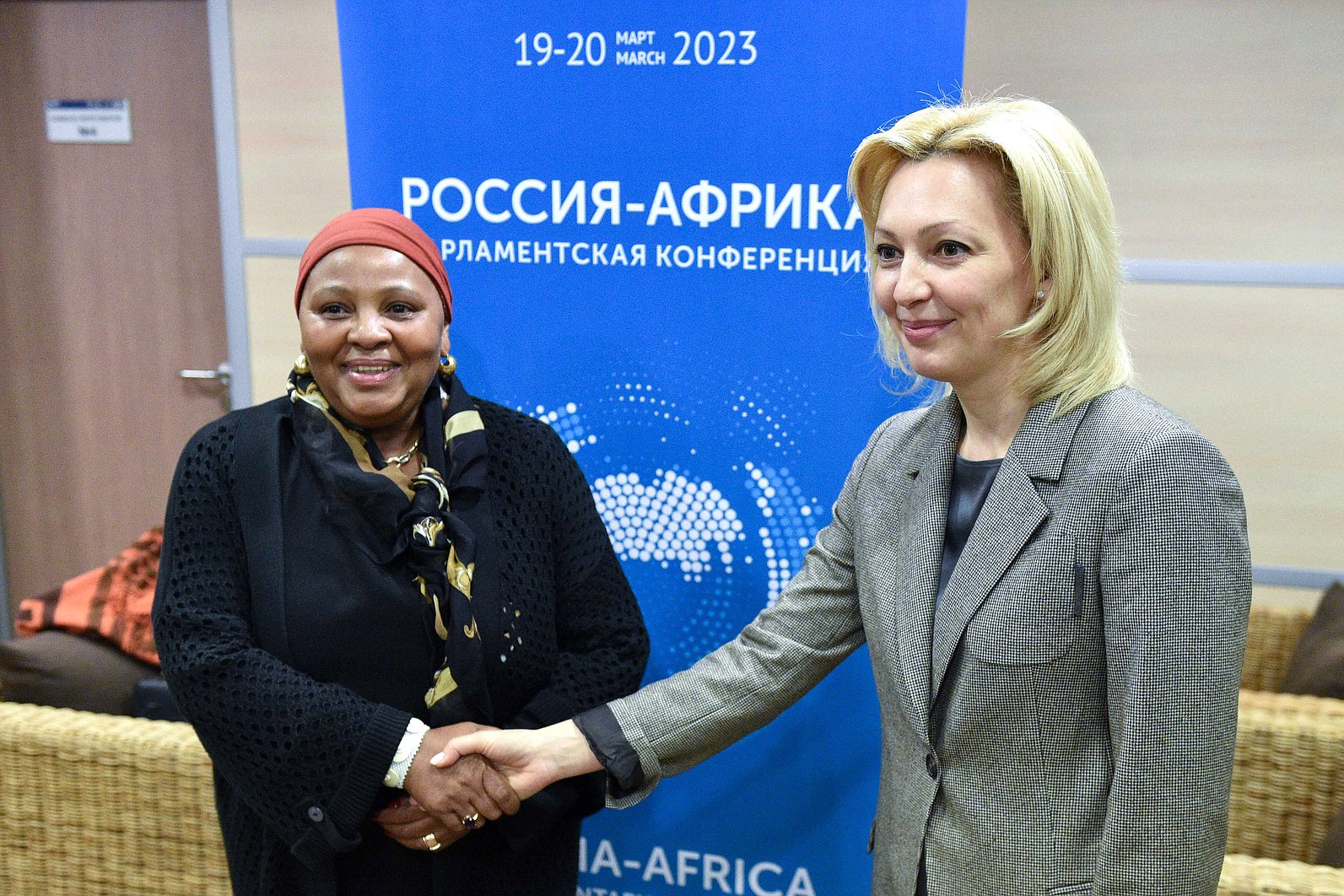
Mapisa-Nqakula with Olga Timofeyeva, 18 March 2023

=== ANC National Executive Committee ===
Mapisa-Nqakula was nominated to stand for re-election to the ANC National Executive Committee ahead of the party's 55th National Conference in December 2022. However, although just a year earlier the Business Day had labelled her a "political heavyweight" and an "integral cog in the ANC's internal dynamics", she did not receive enough votes to be re-elected to the 80-member committee.

=== Resignation ===
When Parliament opened for its final session of the term in early 2024, Mapisa-Nqakula told the press that she hoped to retire after the May 2024 general election, saying, "I think that it is time for me to hand over the baton to the younger ones... Some of us now look like part of the furniture of Parliament."

Before she could retire, in the final weeks of the parliamentary term, she was subject to renewed corruption allegations, which the DA referred to Parliament's Joint Committee on Ethics and Members Interests. She took special leave on 21 March 2024, following a raid at her home, in order to "protect the integrity of Parliament" while the investigation continued. Her deputy, Lech Tsenoli, served as acting speaker in her stead. On 3 April, after she failed to interdict her impending arrest, she announced that she had resigned from the National Assembly with immediate effect in order to focus on fighting the allegations. President Ramaphosa said that her resignation showed integrity and respect for democracy, and that it should be commended.

== Corruption prosecution ==
In early March 2024, while Mapisa-Nqakula was concluding her term as speaker, the Sunday Times reported that she was under criminal investigation for bribery during her tenure as Minister of Defence. According to the newspaper, a SANDF logistics contractor, Nombasa Ntsondwa-Ndhlovu, had told law enforcement agencies that Mapisa-Nqakula had solicited and received up to R2.3 million in cash bribes. Ntsondwa-Ndhlovu was identified as the unnamed whistleblower who had come forward with similar allegations in 2021. As in 2021, Mapisa-Nqakula denied any wrongdoing.

On 19 March 2024, Mapisa-Nqakula's Johannesburg home was raided and searched by the Investigating Directorate of the National Prosecuting Authority, leading to rumours that her arrest was imminent. She approached the Pretoria High Court on an urgent basis, seeking an interdict against her arrest on any corruption charges, but her application was dismissed on 2 April. Two days later, on 4 April, she handed herself in at a police station in Lyttelton, where she was arrested and charged with 12 counts of corruption and one count of money laundering. The Pretoria Magistrate's Court granted her R50,000 bail. She made her second court appearance on 4 June, when the case was postponed to 9 July. Pre-trial hearings were still ongoing in early 2025. Nosiviwe's case was postponed for consultation to July 2026. When the case resumed, it was heard from the state witness Nombasa Ntsondwa-Ndhlovu, the director of Umkhombe Marine that received renteds that Nqakula asked for 4.5 Million in bribes between the years of 2016 and 2019. She also mentioned that her husband,Major General Ndhlovu, who later took the stand to testify, drove her to Nqakula's house to deliver a bribe of R200 000 in cash.

== Personal life ==
She is married to politician Charles Nqakula, with whom she has four sons. One of their sons was convicted of drunk driving in March 2008 after he fell asleep behind the wheel of his mother's car in Cape Town, causing an accident. Another died by stabbing at his home in Johannesburg on 31 October 2015.

Mapisa-Nqakula's brother is Siviwe Mapisa, who was the business partner of Valence Watson; Mapisa-Nqakula, in turn, had a business relationship with Valence's brother, Gavin Watson, who was the chief executive officer of Dyambu Holdings, a company which Mapisa-Nqakula co-founded with ANCWL colleagues. During Mapisa-Nqakula's time at the company, Dyambu's interests reportedly included the Lindela Repatriation Centre and the consortium that built the Gautrain.

According to Mapisa-Nqakula, she is psychic and a traditional healer. Both she and her husband contracted COVID-19 in July 2020.
