= Aishah Cassiem =

Member of the Western Cape Provincial Parliament

The Honourable Aishah Cassiem MPP
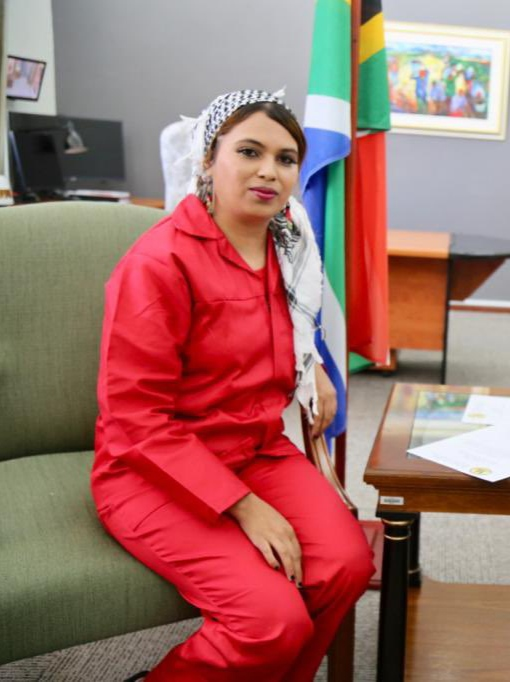

Member of the Western Cape Provincial Parliament
- Incumbent
- Assumed office 3 February 2023

Personal details
- Born: 22 October 1992 (age 33)
- Party: Economic Freedom Fighters (2013–present)
- Spouse: Nazier Paulsen
- Children: 1

Aishah Cassiem (born 22 October 1992) is a South African politician and former investigative journalist who has been a member of the Western Cape Provincial Parliament representing the Economic Freedom Fighters (EFF) since 3 February 2023. Cassiem is also the Provincial Treasurer of the EFF in the Western Cape.

== Background ==
Cassiem worked as an investigate journalist for Independent Media before she became active in politics. In 2018, she established a mobile pop-up library in Cape Town. Cassiem was cited by Mail & Guardian as one of the "Top 200 Young South Africans" for her work in Arts, Entertainment, Film & Media in 2021. In an interview with Independent Online in February 2023, Cassiem revealed that she is currently in her third year of studies for a Bachelor of Arts in Government, Administration, and Development Studies from UNISA.

== Political career ==
Cassiem joined the Economic Freedom Fighters in 2013 after interviewing the party's Western Cape convenor Nazier Paulsen whom she married a year later.

By 2022, Cassiem was a Cape Town city councillor for the EFF. She was elected treasurer of the EFF's provincial structure in the Western Cape in October 2022.

After the two EFF representatives in the Western Cape Provincial Parliament, Melikhaya Xego and Nosipho Makamba-Botya vacated their seats in the provincial parliament in January 2023 after losing their positions at the party's provincial conference in October 2022, party insiders speculated that Cassiem was one of the two candidates who would be selected to represent the party in the provincial parliament. She was sworn in as a member of the provincial parliament on 3 February 2023.

In the 2024 South African general election, Cassiem was placed at number one on the EFF's provincial candidate list of the Western Cape, in addition to being placed at number eighty on the national list, making her both a candidate to the Western Cape Provincial Parliament as well as to the National Assembly of South Africa. Cassiem was re-elected to the Provincial Parliament at the election.
