= Nazier Paulsen =

Member of Parliament of South Africa

The Honourable Nazier Paulsen MP

Member of the National Assembly
- In office 20 May 2015 – 28 May 2024

Member of the Western Cape Provincial Parliament
- In office 21 May 2014 – May 2015

Member of the National Assembly
- Incumbent
- Assumed office 28 August 2024

Personal details
- Born: Mogamad Nazier Paulsen
- Party: Economic Freedom Fighters
- Spouse: Aishah Cassiem
- Education: University of Cape Town

Mogamad Nazier Paulsen is South African politician currently serving as a Member of the National Assembly for the Economic Freedom Fighters (EFF). Prior to serving parliament, he served as a Member of the Western Cape Provincial Parliament.

== Early life and career ==
Nazier Paulsen and his family had previously been part of the anti-apartheid movement. Paulsen was a member of the United Democratic Front. He obtained a BCom Honours degree and a Postgraduate Diploma in Distributed Systems from the University of Cape Town. He was previously an Information and Technology lecturer at the Cape Peninsula University of Technology. Paulsen also served as the chairperson of the Mitchells Plain Community Development Corporation and the chairperson of the South African Progressive Civic Organisation (SAPCO).

Paulsen joined the Economic Freedom Fighters in 2013. He was the party's Western Cape Premier candidate for the 2014 general elections. The EFF won one seat in the Western Cape Provincial Parliament. Paulsen filled the seat on 21 May 2014.

In May 2015, the EFF redeployed him to the National Assembly of South Africa. Bernard Joseph succeeded him as the EFF's sole representative in the Provincial Parliament. He won a second term as a Member of Parliament in May 2019.

Paulsen was not ranked high enough on the EFF national list to be returned to the National Assembly after the 2024 general election.

== Incidents ==
When Paulsen took office as a Member of the Western Cape Provincial Parliament, he was assigned a laptop. He resigned as a Member of the Provincial Parliament in May 2015 and initially refused to hand the laptop back. The Provincial Parliament approached the police, and he was charged with theft. The charge was withdrawn in July 2019.

On 6 November 2018, Paulsen was involved in a fracas with Agang MP, Andries Tlouamma. In response, President Cyril Ramaphosa called on MPs to embrace non-racialism when interacting with one another. The footage of the occurrence was referred to Parliament's Disciplinary Committee.

On 15 August 2019, Paulsen appeared in court due to his alleged assault of a man who was parked outside his ex-wife's house in early August. His next court appearance was in September.

On 19 November 2019, Paulsen was asked to leave the National Assembly following his refusal to retract his statement that Public Enterprises Minister Pravin Gordhan appoints SOE staff based on their race.

During a sitting of the National Assembly in March 2021, Paulsen told DA MP Phumzile van Damme to go back to Eswatini and the DA chief whip in the National Assembly, Natasha Mazzone, to go back to Italy. Deputy speaker Lechesa Tsenoli then ordered Paulsen to leave the House amid the tension. As Paulsen was leaving, the DA's Van Damme waved at him and Tsenoli told her not to be provocative. Van Damme then said that Paulsen allegedly threatened to "beat her up" and got into an argument with EFF MPs. She was then ordered to leave and was accompanied by two male DA MPs, Kevin Mileham and Chris Hunsinger. Paulsen denied threatening her. On 28 July 2021, the National Assembly's Power and Privileges Committee decided that it would investigate the matter and that Paulsen would face disciplinary hearings for his actions. It is alleged that he also threatened to assault two other DA MPs at the sitting back in March.

In January 2023, the Cape Youth Front (CYF) filed charges against Mr Paulsen after he called for supporters of Cape independence to be executed on social media platform X (formerly twitter). In addition, in response to a pro-Cape Independence account he said: “we should start finding the IP addresses of these accounts and start locating the people behind it”. The CYF consequently formally laid charges against Mr Paulsen, on ground of incitement to commit violence under Section 17 of the Riotous Assembly Act [no. 17 of 1956].
