= Saaiman =

Saaiman is a surname. Notable people with the surname include:

- Cameron Saaiman (born 2000), South African mixed martial artist
- Pieter Saaiman (1951–2021), South African politician
