= Melikhaya =

Melikhaya is a given name. Notable people with the given name include:

- Melikhaya Frans (born 1990), South African long-distance runner
- Melikhaya Xego, South African politician
