= Nosipho =

Nosipho is a given name. Notable people with the name include:

- Nosipho Dastile (1938–2009), South African community and anti-apartheid activist
- Nosipho Dumisa (born 1988), South African writer, director and producer
- Nosipho Makamba-Botya, South African politician
- Nosipho Ntwanambi (1959–2014), South African politician, women's and human rights activist
