= Xego =

Xego is a surname. Notable people with the surname include:

- Melikhaya Xego, South African politician
- Sheilla Xego (born 1960), South African politician
