= Pieter Saaiman =

South African politician (1951–2021)

Member of the Northern Cape Executive Council for Conservation and Tourism
- In office April 2004 – January 2009
- Premier: Manne Dipico

Member of the Northern Cape Provincial Legislature
- In office April 2004 – January 2009
- In office April 1996 – September 2003

Deputy Minister of Correctional Services
- In office September 2003 – April 2004
- President: Thabo Mbeki
- Minister: Ben Skosana
- Succeeded by: Cheryl Gillwald

Member of the National Assembly
- In office September 2003 – April 2004
- In office May 1994 – April 1996

Personal details
- Born: Pieter Willem Saaiman; 18 April 1951 Prieska, Cape Province; Union of South Africa
- Died: 20 October 2021 (aged 70) Tshwane, Gauteng; Republic of South Africa
- Party: African National Congress (2005–2009, 2009–2021)
- Other political affiliations: Congress of the People (2009); New National Party (1997–2005); National Party (1991–1997); United Democratic Party (until 1991)
- Nickname: P. W.

Pieter Willem Saaiman (18 April 1951 – 20 October 2021) was a South African politician from the Northern Cape who served as Deputy Minister of Correctional Services from 2003 to 2004. Between 1989 and 2009, he held a variety of positions in the national and provincial governments, representing a series of parties.

A teacher by profession, Saaiman entered politics as a representative of the United Democratic Party in the apartheid-era House of Representatives, which he joined in 1989. After joining the National Party (NP) in 1991, he was a minister in the chamber from 1992 to 1994. Subsequently, after the end of apartheid in 1994, he continued his career as a legislator, moving frequently between the Northern Cape Provincial Legislature and the National Assembly. He also served as the Northern Cape provincial leader of the NP, and later the New National Party (NNP), from 1997 to 2005.

After his term as Deputy Minister from 2003 to 2004, Saaiman served as the Northern Cape's Member of the Executive Council for Conservation and Tourism from 2004 until 2009. During that period, he crossed the floor from the NNP to the governing African National Congress (ANC) in September 2005. In January 2009, he retired from the government and the ANC in order to join the Congress of the People, although he rejoined the ANC later the same year. Later in his life, in 2016, Saaiman left retirement to represent the ANC as a local councillor in his hometown in the Siyathemba Local Municipality.

== Early life and career ==
Saaiman was born on 18 April 1951 in Prieska in the present-day Northern Cape. He was classified as Coloured under apartheid. After matriculating at Orion Secondary School in De Aar, he completed teaching diplomas at Southern Cape Training College and the University of Western Cape in 1973 and 1975 respectively. Thereafter he taught at several schools in the Cape Province until 1989, when he entered frontline politics.

== Apartheid-era political career ==
In the 1989 general election, Saaiman was elected to the House of Representatives, the all-Coloured house of the Tricameral Parliament. He was a member of the United Democratic Party until 1991, when it was dissolved and he joined the National Party (NP). From 1992 to 1994, he served as a minister in the House of Representatives (a position distinct from, and junior to, ministers of the national cabinet): he was Coloured Minister of Housing, Local Government and Agriculture from 1992 and then Minister of Education from 1993.

== Post-apartheid political career ==
=== National Assembly: 1994–1996 ===
In the 1994 general election, Saaiman was elected to represent the NP in the new National Assembly. In addition, in the same year, he was elected as deputy provincial leader of the NP's branch in the Northern Cape, deputising Kraai van Niekerk.

=== Northern Cape Legislature: 1996–2003 ===
Midway through the legislative term, Saaiman resigned from his seat in the National Assembly in order to fill a casual vacancy in the Northern Cape Provincial Legislature, where he was sworn in on 30 April 1996. The following year, in September 1997, he was elected unanimously to succeed van Niekerk as provincial leader of the NP in the Northern Cape. He was the first Coloured person and the second non-white person (after Mpumalanga's David Malatsi) to serve as an NP provincial leader.

As party provincial leader, he led the NP's caucus in the provincial legislature, including after the party was restyled as the New National Party (NNP), and he was the party's candidate for election as Premier of the Northern Cape in 1999. Though he was not elected as Premier, and though the NNP lost several seats in the province, Saaiman was re-elected to a full term in the legislature.

=== Deputy Correctional Services Minister: 2003–2004 ===
In September 2003, President Thabo Mbeki announced Saaiman's appointment as Deputy Minister of Correctional Services, the result of a cooperation agreement between the NNP and the governing African National Congress (ANC). Saaiman left the provincial legislature and was sworn in to the National Assembly in order to take up his new office, in which he deputised Minister Ben Skosana. He remained provincial leader of the NNP.

=== Northern Cape Executive Council: 2004–2009 ===
In the 2004 general election, Saaiman returned to the Northern Cape Provincial Legislature, holding the first of only two NNP seats; due to its poor electoral performance, the party had lost its status as official provincial opposition to the Democratic Alliance (DA). However, in terms of the ANC–NNP cooperation agreement, Saaiman was appointed to the Northern Cape Executive Council by Premier Manne Dipico, who named him as Member of the Executive Council (MEC) for Conservation and Tourism. An additional department, economic affairs, was added to his portfolio in 2006.

While serving as MEC, during the September 2005 floor-crossing window, Saaiman announced his defection from the NNP to the ANC. His tenure in his new party lasted just over three years: in January 2009, he resigned from the ANC and from the legislature in order to defect to the Congress of the People (COPE), a newly formed breakaway party. In that year's general election, Saaiman stood as a COPE candidate for election to the National Assembly, but he was ranked low on the party list and did not gain a seat. He rejoined the ANC in September 2009.

=== Local government: 2016–2021 ===
After several years away from frontline politics, Saaiman returned from retirement ahead of the 2016 local elections, when he won election as an ANC ward councillor in the Siyathemba Local Municipality, which included his hometown, Prieska. He was also appointed as chief whip in the council.

== Personal life and death ==
He was married to Ethel Saaiman, whom he met while teaching at Steinkopf and with whom he had two children, a daughter and a son. He was a devout Christian. Following Ethel's death in early 2020, he died on 20 October 2021 in Tshwane.
