= Sipo Mzimela =

South African politician and activist (1935–2013)

Member of the National Assembly
- In office June 1999 – June 2001
- In office 9 May 1994 – 24 February 1999

Minister of Correctional Services
- In office May 1994 – April 1998
- President: Nelson Mandela
- Preceded by: Adriaan Vlok (as Minister of Prisons)
- Succeeded by: Ben Skosana

Personal details
- Born: Sipho Elijah Mzimela; 19 June 1935 Durban, Natal; Union of South Africa
- Died: 2 February 2013 (aged 77) Atlanta, Georgia; United States of America
- Party: United Democratic Movement (1999–2001); Inkatha Freedom Party (1990–1999); African National Congress (until 1985)
- Spouse(s): Esther Mzimela (divorced) Gail DeCosta (m. 1989)
- Education: General Theological Seminary (MDiv); New York University (PhD)

Sipho Elijah Mzimela (19 June 1935 – 2 February 2013) was a South African politician, anti-apartheid activist, and Christian minister. He was the first post-apartheid Minister of Correctional Services from 1994 to 1998. Originally a member of the African National Congress (ANC), he joined the Inkatha Freedom Party (IFP) in 1990 and then the United Democratic Movement (UDM) in 1999.

Mzimela went into exile with the ANC after the Sharpeville uprising and spent three decades in exile, primarily in the United States. Upon his return to South Africa in 1990, his strident anti-communism led him to join the rival IFP, which he represented in the National Assembly from 1994 to 1999. He also represented the IFP as a minister in Nelson Mandela's Government of National Unity and was the party's deputy chairperson from 1995 to 1998.

Following a fallout with the IFP leadership under Mangosuthu Buthelezi, Mzimela lost each of his positions: he resigned from his party office in April 1998, was fired from the cabinet shortly afterwards, and was expelled from the party entirely in February 1999. He returned to the National Assembly in June 1999 as a member of the UDM, but the UDM, in turn, expelled him in June 2001. Thereafter Mzimela retired to Atlanta, Georgia, where he died in 2013.

== Early life and political career ==
Mzimela was born on 19 June 1935 in Durban in the former Natal province. Born to a carpenter father, he had three sisters and was raised in the Anglican Church. Although he had inspired to become a priest as a child, he became a teacher instead. While teaching, and partly due to his admiration of Albert Luthuli, he became involved in anti-apartheid activism as a member of the African National Congress (ANC). After the Sharpeville uprising of 1960, as the ANC was banned amid a wave of repression by the apartheid state, Mzimela left South Africa to go into exile abroad, spending time in Czechoslovakia, Germany, and various African countries.

=== Exile in the United States ===
He ultimately settled in the United States, where he studied for his master of divinity at the General Theological Seminary in New York. He was ordained as a priest in 1976 and served at churches in New York and New Jersey while completing his doctorate in ethics at New York University. He remained active in the ANC – among other things, he helped establish the ANC's office at the United Nations – and also sang on a record, entitled Liberation: Freedom Songs, which he co-produced with Abdullah Ibrahim and released in 1978. In the mid-1980s, the Episcopal Church sent him on a two-year mission to Kenya, where he taught at St Paul's Theological College. He returned to the United States in 1986 to work as an associate priest at St Bartholomew's Church in Atlanta, Georgia.

In Mzimela's account, he quit the ANC in 1985, after the party reinforced its ties with the South African Communist Party at its famous Kabwe conference. He also said that he had lost faith in the ANC project much earlier, after being exposed to the "thoroughly evil system" of communism in Czechoslovakia in 1963. However, Mark Gevisser pointed out that Mzimela appeared in the American media as an ANC representative, arguing in favour of sanctions against apartheid, as late as 1987. Nonetheless, Mzimela had clearly distanced himself from the ANC – for example, complaining privately that the party was dominated by Xhosa-speakers – and the break was clear in public by 1989, by which time Mzimela was a strident opponent of sanctions. Gevisser suggested that Mzimela's change in attitude was the result of his experiences in Kenya, as well as an argument he had with his ANC superior in New York, Johnny Makathini, shortly before leaving for the mission.

=== Return to South Africa ===
In 1990, the South African government unbanned the ANC and other political organisations in order to facilitate negotiations to end apartheid. Mzimela returned to South Africa later the same year and met Mangosuthu Buthelezi, the leader of the KwaZulu bantustan and of the Inkatha Freedom Party (IFP). He joined the IFP and went back to the United States to serve as the party's representative there.

He returned to South Africa permanently in 1993, the same year that he published Marching to Slavery: South Africa's Descent to Communism, a monograph that argued that an ANC government would be a front for rule by white and Indian communists and would lead to South Africa's demise. Also in 1993, Mzimela delivered a fiery speech to the IFP's national congress, denouncing the ANC and the sitting South African president, F. W. de Klerk, whom he said was "born a liar, lived a liar, will die a liar, and he’ll lie in Hell". Mzimela joined the IFP's delegation to the ongoing constitutional negotiations between the ANC and the government, where he frequently took a hard line; according to Gevisser, it was Mzimela, with Walter Felgate and Mario Ambrosini, who persuaded Buthelezi to form alliances with white right-wing groups and to boycott the 1994 general election.

== Post-apartheid political career ==
The IFP ultimately participated in the 1994 general election and Mzimela was elected to an IFP seat in the National Assembly, the lower house of the new South African Parliament. The interim constitution entitled the IFP to representation in a multi-party Government of National Unity, and newly elected President Nelson Mandela appointed Mzimela to his cabinet as Minister of Correctional Services. In addition, at the IFP's national congress in 1995, the party amended its constitution to create the new post of national deputy chairperson, a position in which Mzimela was installed; he deputised Frank Mdlalose and was viewed as "directly in the line of succession". He also continued to represent the IFP at constitutional negotiations.

=== Correctional Services Minister: 1994–1998 ===
Mzimela's performance as Minister of Correctional Services was not admired by the Mail & Guardian, which gave him an "E" grade in 1997, saying, "If [Safety and Security Minister Sydney] Mufamadi is too soft on crime, Mzimela is too hard on criminals". The newspaper also criticised his lack of commitment to affirmative action in correctional services facilities, an issue which brought Mzimela into conflict with ANC MP Carl Niehaus, who chaired the Portfolio Committee on Correctional Services during the first democratic Parliament. President Mandela ultimately stepped in on two occasions, in 1995 and 1996, to mediate the dispute between Mzimela and Niehaus.

=== Expulsion from the IFP: 1998–1999 ===
In late 1997, Mzimela wrote an op-ed in a Sunday newspaper in which he commented on an unfolding debate about the relationship between the IFP and the ANC. He professed himself to be in favour of a merger between the parties. Other IFP leaders responded with hostility: at a press conference, Buthelezi told the press, "I don’t think any party will tolerate a member doing what he [Mzimela] is doing", and he told the Mail & Guardian that Mzimela was "out of order" and had "embarrassed the party by shooting his mouth [off]".

The saga inaugurated a long period of tension in the IFP leadership, until, in early April 1998, the IFP announced that Mzimela had stepped down as deputy chairperson of the party, ostensibly due to ill health, and would be replaced by Lionel Mtshali in an acting capacity. A week later, at Buthelezi's request, President Mandela dismissed Mzimela from his cabinet, replacing him with the IFP's Ben Skosana. Although Mzimela remained an ordinary Member of Parliament and of the IFP, there was rampant speculation that he would leave the party, possibly to join the ANC.

In subsequent months, Mzimela was subject to an internal disciplinary inquiry, which ended in 1999 when the IFP found him guilty of having brought the party into disrepute. He was expelled from the IFP on 24 February 1999, meaning that he lost his seat in the National Assembly. Mzimela said that he had been expelled because of his insistence that the party should handle matters in a free and open way.

=== Representative for the UDM: 1999–2001 ===
The day after his expulsion from the IFP, Mzimela announced that he would join the United Democratic Movement (UDM), which had recently been founded by Bantu Holomisa as a breakaway from the ANC. Holomisa said that Mzimela's recruitment had been initiated by Sifiso Nkabinde, who had held several meetings with Mzimela before his death. Mzimela stood as a UDM candidate in the June 1999 general election and was returned to the National Assembly under the UDM's banner. He served as the UDM's chief whip.

However, Mzimela soon fell out with the leadership of his new party. In June 2001, he was suspended from the UDM, pending a disciplinary inquiry into the misappropriation of the UDM's parliamentary funds. Mzimela said that his suspension was unconstitutional, called for a parliamentary and police investigation into the UDM, and insisted that he would continue to appear at Parliament. On 30 June 2001, a UDM disciplinary committee found Mzimela guilty of 20 counts of misconduct, including misuse of party funds for personal purposes and bringing the party into disrepute. He was expelled from the party and therefore lost his parliamentary seat. Mzimela had apparently used the UDM's parliamentary funds to pay his domestic worker's salary, as well as to make out a total of R12,000 in cheques to his wife. The UDM said that it would also lay criminal charges against him, and Holomisa told a press conference, "There is only one way for him and that [is] that he must be taken to the prison ships he once proposed when he was Minister of Correctional Services".

Mzimela maintained his innocence. He claimed that, while he was a lengthy sick leave, acting chief whip Tommy Abrahams and UDM treasurer Nilo Botha had doctored the UDM's audited financial statements. In the aftermath of his expulsion from the National Assembly, he announced his retirement from politics.

== Personal life and death ==
While living in Germany during apartheid, Mzimela married his first wife, Esther Mzimela, with whom he had two daughters. In 1989 in Atlanta, he married his second wife, Gail DeCosta, and became stepfather to her daughter. After leaving Parliament in 2001, he retired to the suburbs of Atlanta, where he was an associate priest at St Bartholomew's Church and a lecturer in religious studies at Agnes Scott College.

Mzimela had diabetes, which led to the amputation of his leg in 2000 and to health problems later in life. He died on 2 February 2013 at a hospice in Decatur, Georgia after several months of illness.
