= Tommy Abrahams =

South African politician

Member of the National Assembly
- In office June 1999 – April 2004

Personal details
- Born: Thomas Abrahams; 18 April 1946 (age 80)
- Citizenship: South Africa
- Party: African National Congress (since 2003)
- Other political affiliations: United Democratic Movement (until 2003)

Thomas Abrahams (born 18 April 1946) is a retired South African politician who served in the National Assembly from 1999 to 2004. He was the national treasurer of the United Democratic Movement (UDM) until 1 April 2003, when he crossed the floor to the African National Congress (ANC).

== Life and career ==
Abrahams was born on 18 April 1946. He gained election to the National Assembly in the 1999 general election, listed on the UDM's national party list. At an early stage of the legislative term, he acted as the UDM's chief whip while the incumbent, Sipo Mzimela, took lengthy sick leave. In mid-2001, when Mzimela was suspended from the UDF, he told the press that Abrahams, while acting as chief whip, had been complicit in mismanagement of the party's constituency and parliamentary funds. The UDM denied the allegation and said that Mzimela held a grudge against the party because of his suspension.

In March 2003, by which time Abrahams was the national treasurer of the UDM, the Mail & Guardian reported that Abrahams was one of several UDM members who was unhappy in the party. Shortly afterwards, during the floor-crossing window of April 2003, Abrahams and five other MPs resigned from the UDM and joined the governing ANC. He served the rest of his term under the ANC banner and left Parliament after the 2004 general election.
