= Wandile Kasibe =

South african politician

The Honourable Wandile Kasibe MPP

Member of the Western Cape Provincial Parliament
- In office 12 April 2024 – 29 May 2024

Personal details
- Party: Economic Freedom Fighters (2014–present)

Wandile Kasibe is an activist who has served as a member of the Western Cape Provincial Parliament. Before he resigned as a member of the Provincial legislature, he was sworn in on 12 April 2024, to replace Thembile Klaas.
