= John Mavuso =

South African politician (1926–2011)

Minister for General Services
- In office 31 March 1996 – 30 June 1996
- President: Nelson Mandela
- Preceded by: Position established
- Succeeded by: Position abolished

Personal details
- Born: 1926 Ermelo, Transvaal; Union of South Africa
- Died: 24 May 2011 Midrand, Gauteng; South Africa
- Party: National Party
- Other political affiliations: African National Congress; Inkatha

John Solane Absolom Mavuso (1926 – 24 May 2011) was a South African politician who served as Minister for General Services in Nelson Mandela's Government of National Unity between March and June 1996. He represented the National Party in Parliament. However, in the 1950s, Mavuso was a Treason Triallist and a member of the National Executive Committee of the African National Congress.

== Early life and activism ==
Mavuso was born in 1926 in Ermelo in the former Eastern Transvaal, now Mpumalanga Province. He joined the African National Congress (ANC) in 1948, the year that the National Party (NP) came to power with a mandate to implement apartheid, and he was active in the ANC's Alexandra branch while working as a messenger and shopkeeper in Johannesburg. He was a member of the ANC's National Executive Committee (NEC) from 1955 to 1956. He was banned several times under the Suppression of Communism Act and in December 1956 he was arrested in Johannesburg and charged with treason as one of 156 accused in the Treason Trial. The charges against him were dropped in December 1957.

The ANC was banned by the government in 1960 but Mavuso continued to work for the organisation underground. In 1962, he was appointed as a member of the ANC's National Secretariat under the leadership of Govan Mbeki; in the aftermath of the Rivonia Trial arrests, the body took over the functions of the NEC. In the mid-1960s Mavuso was suspected of being a police informant, on the grounds that several underground operatives had been arrested during rendezvous set up by Mavuso; however, most of his comrades came to the conclusion that the Security Branch had identified him as an ANC leader and kept him under surveillance in order to identify his contacts.

By 1988 Mavuso had left the ANC and worked in the provincial government of the Transvaal. He joined Inkatha for a period before joining the NP in 1993. Attending the party's annual conference in the Transvaal that year, he told a reporter that he admired that the NP, which by then was negotiating the end of apartheid, had the "courage... to admit its mistakes of the past and to decide to follow a new road of reconciliation".

== Minister for General Services: 1996 ==
Mavuso was not initially elected to Parliament in South Africa's first post-apartheid elections in 1994, but he joined during the legislative term: in February 1996, the NP nominated him for appointment as a minister in the Government of National Unity, President Nelson Mandela's transitional power-sharing cabinet. Mavuso was named as Minister for General Services, a new ministry without portfolio that would perform special tasks assigned by the cabinet, and he took office at the end of March 1996.

He was the first black NP politician to serve in the cabinet and his appointment was viewed as part of the NP's campaign to broaden its appeal to non-white voters. The Mail & Guardian quoted NP president F. W. de Klerk as having told an NP rally that Mavuso was "a black man... but he is a competent black" and said that Mavuso's critics characterised him as a "party-hopping hack". Mavuso responded:

If Jews and Germans can intermarry, what the hell is wrong with us coming to terms with the Afrikaners? Of all the parties I have come to know, the National Party had the courage to make a U-turn on a horrendous policy [apartheid]... Let other people who’ve been responsible for burning other blacks alive in the name of liberation take the courage to apologize to the nation. Then I will see some credibility in black leadership.

In May 1996, weeks after Mavuso took office, de Klerk announced that the NP and its members would be withdrawing from all posts in the cabinet on 30 June. Mandela subsequently disbanded Mavuso's ministry. However, Mavuso remained an ordinary Member of Parliament. He was viewed as solidly in the moderate camp of the NP and he was involved in campaigning for the Democratic Alliance (DA) when the NP (then restyled as the New National Party) joined the alliance in 2000.

== Personal life and death ==
Mavuso married his first wife Sonto Sybil Mavuso (née Mdakane). They had multiple children. Surviving until adulthood from his first marriage were Mayibuye Mavuso, Gabisile Mavuso, Thokozile Mavuso and Phindile Mavuso. Others died in childhood due to alleged abuses in her marital home. During the apartheid they lived in Alexandra Gauteng with other prominent apartheid figures such as Nelson Mandela and Winnie Madikizela Mandela. From his first marriage he has 3 grandchildren, and 2 great grandchildren. Sonto and John separated. Sonto resided in Newcastle while John remained in Johannesburg. He was an absent father to their children. Except Mayibuye whom he had a close relationship with as the older boy child. He remarried. Mavuso died on 24 May 2011 in hospital in Midrand. He was married and had four children and several grandchildren.

== See also ==
- History of the African National Congress
