= Lechesa Tsenoli =

South African politician

Solomon Lechesa Tsenoli

Acting Speaker of the National Assembly of South Africa
- In office 25 March 2024 – 14 June 2024
- President: Cyril Ramaphosa
- Preceded by: Nosiviwe Mapisa-Nqakula
- Succeeded by: Thoko Didiza
- In office 6 August 2021 – 19 August 2021
- President: Cyril Ramaphosa
- Preceded by: Thandi Modise
- Succeeded by: Nosiviwe Mapisa-Nqakula

Deputy Speaker of the National Assembly of South Africa
- In office 21 May 2014 – 14 June 2024
- President: Jacob Zuma; Cyril Ramaphosa
- Speaker: Baleka Mbete; Thandi Modise; Nosiviwe Mapisa-Nqakula
- Preceded by: Nomaindiya Mfeketo
- Succeeded by: Annelie Lotriet

Minister of Cooperative Governance and Traditional Affairs
- In office 9 July 2013 – 25 May 2014
- President: Jacob Zuma
- Preceded by: Richard Baloyi
- Succeeded by: Pravin Gordhan

Member of the National Assembly of South Africa
- In office April 1994 – June 2024

Personal details
- Born: Solomon Lechesa Tsenoli Bultfontein, South Africa
- Party: South African Communist Party
- Other political affiliations: African National Congress (Tripartite Alliance)
- Occupation: Politician; anti-apartheid activist
- Cabinet: Jacob Zuma Cyril Ramaphosa

Solomon Lechesa Tsenoli is a South African politician who served as the Deputy Speaker of the National Assembly of South Africa from 2014 to 2024. He served as acting Speaker from 25 March to 14 June 2024, when Speaker Nosiviwe Mapisa-Nqakula took leave over corruption allegations. She subsequently resigned on the 3rd of April.

== See also ==
- African Commission on Human and Peoples' Rights
- Constitution of South Africa
- History of the African National Congress
- Politics in South Africa
- Provincial governments of South Africa
