= Adriaan Vlok =

South African politician (1937–2023)

Minister of Correctional Services
- In office July 1991 – 1994
- President: Frederik Willem de Klerk

Minister of Law and Order
- In office December 1986 – July 1991
- President: Pieter Willem Botha; Frederik Willem de Klerk
- Preceded by: Louis le Grange
- Succeeded by: Hernus Kriel

Personal details
- Born: 11 December 1937 Sutherland, Cape Province, South Africa
- Died: 8 January 2023 (aged 85) South Africa
- Party: National Party
- Education: University of Pretoria

Adriaan Johannes Vlok (11 December 1937 – 8 January 2023) was a South African politician. He was Minister of Law and Order in South Africa from 1986 to 1991 in the final years of the apartheid era. Facing increasingly intense opposition and political unrest in this period, the South African government – through the State Security Council of which Vlok was a member – planned and implemented drastic repressive measures, including hit squads, carrying out bombings and assassination of anti-apartheid activists.

== Early life ==
Adriaan Vlok was born in the Northern Cape town of Sutherland in what was the then Cape Province on 11 December 1937 to Nicolaas Vlok and Bett Oliver where he grew up on a rural small holding along the Orange River. He attended Neilerdrift Primary School and matriculated from Keimoes High School in 1956 located in Keimoes. He obtained a Dip. Proc. from the University of Pretoria in 1962.

== Career ==
Vlok started his career working in the magistrates office for the Department of Justice in Keimoes and Upington joining the National Party in 1959. From 1959 to 1966, Vlok served in Pretoria as the under-secretary for the Department of Justice whilst studying for an Attorney's Diploma at the University of Pretoria. He was then made assistant private secretary to South African Prime Minister B. J. Vorster.

He resigned from the Department of Justice with the aim of entering politics in 1970, running a court messaging service. In 1972, he was elected to the Verwoerdburg (now known as Centurion) City Council and was elected to represent the area in the national Parliament in 1974. In September 1984, he was appointed Deputy Minister of Defence and was then made Deputy Minister of Law and Order a few months later in early 1985. During his time as Deputy Minister of Law and Order his ministry was responsible for the suppression and detention of around 30,000 people. In 1988 as minister of Law and Order he oversaw the restriction of 17 anti-apartheid organisations.

Vlok's position as minister became especially controversial after 1990 during the negotiations to end apartheid, with the African National Congress insisting on his dismissal. President FW de Klerk responded by moving him to a less controversial post as Minister of Correctional Services in July 1991. In 1993–1994 he was the last chairman of the minister's council of the House of Assembly, the white chamber of parliament.

== TRC amnesty ==
In 1999, Vlok was granted amnesty by the Truth and Reconciliation Commission (TRC) – the sole cabinet minister to have admitted committing crimes, including the bombing of the headquarters of the South African Council of Churches at Khotso House, and the COSATU trade union headquarters.

== Conviction and apologies ==
In mid-2006, Vlok came forward with public apologies for a number of acts that he had not disclosed to the TRC, and for which he could therefore be prosecuted. In a dramatic gesture, he washed the feet of Frank Chikane who, as secretary-general of the South African Council of Churches, had been targeted by Vlok for assassination. Subsequently, he washed the feet of the ten widows and mothers of the "Mamelodi 10", a group of anti-apartheid activists who had been lured to their death by a police informant. He said he had become a born again Christian prior to his public apologies for his actions as Minister of Law and Order and cites this as the cause of his change of heart about his role in apartheid and his need to seek forgiveness. On 17 August 2007, the High Court in Pretoria handed him a suspended ten-year sentence for his role in the 1989 plot to kill Frank Chikane.

In 2014, he publicly called for more apartheid era perpetrators to come forward and apologise for their actions.

As of 2015, he started and ran a child feeding charity named the Feed a Child initiative.

== Personal life and death ==
Vlok died on 8 January 2023, at the age of 85.
