= Ngconde Balfour =

South African politician

High Commissioner to Botswana

Minister of Correctional Services
- In office 29 April 2004 – 10 May 2009
- President: Thabo Mbeki
- Preceded by: Ben Skosana
- Succeeded by: Nosiviwe Mapisa-Nqakula

Minister of Sport and Recreation
- In office 21 June 1999 – 28 April 2004
- Preceded by: Steve Tshwete
- Succeeded by: Makhenkesi Stofile

Personal details
- Born: Ngconde Mathemba Bryce Balfour; 23 August 1954 (age 71) kuNtselamanzi, Alice, Eastern Cape
- Party: African National Congress
- Occupation: Teacher

Ngconde Mathemba Bryce Balfour (born 23 August 1954 in kuNtselamanzi, Alice, Eastern Cape) is a South African politician and has served as Minister of Correctional Services and Minister of Sport.

== Early life and career ==
Balfour was born in the Eastern Cape and completed his schooling at Jabavu High School in the town of Alice. He went on to study at Lovedale College and Fort Hare University. After spending time as a political detainee, Balfour went into exile in Australia from 1989 to 1992. While in Australia, he attended Victoria University, Australia.

Balfour has been a South African Member of Parliament since 1996 and was appointed as Minister of Correctional Services on 29 April 2004.

Following the resignation of President Thabo Mbeki in September 2008, Balfour was one of ten ministers who submitted their resignations on 23 September, although it was subsequently announced that he might be willing to remain in his post. He was retained in his post as the Cabinet announced on 25 September.

Balfour was appointed as South Africa's high commissioner to Botswana but resigned the position less than a year after the diplomatic posting.

In 2011 it was announced that Balfour was taking over as the chairperson of Boxing South Africa.

== Woodhill Golf Estate ==
Balfour's wife Thozama Mqobi-Balfour, Correctional Services regional commissioner for Gauteng, was suspended pending the outcome of a disciplinary process for renting a house in the Woodhill Golf Estate in Pretoria for some R30,000 a month despite having the use of an official residence. She was also named by Auditor-General Terence Nombembe as one of 49 government officials who benefited from government contracts worth R74m. Fellow National commissioner Xoliswa Sibeko was also suspended for renting a home in the same golf estate for R35,000 a month.
