= Dullah Omar =

South African politician

Minister of Transport
- In office 1999–2004
- President: Thabo Mbeki
- Preceded by: Mac Maharaj
- Succeeded by: Jeff Radebe

Minister of Justice
- In office 1994–1999
- President: Nelson Mandela
- Preceded by: Kobie Coetsee
- Succeeded by: Penuell Maduna

Personal details
- Born: Abdullah Mohamed Omar; 26 May 1934 Observatory, Cape Town, Cape Province, Union of South Africa
- Died: 13 March 2004 (aged 69)
- Education: University of Cape Town
- Occupation: Lawyer

Abdullah Mohamed Omar OLS (26 May 1934 – 13 March 2004), better known as Dullah Omar, was a South African anti-Apartheid activist, lawyer, and a minister in the South African cabinet from 1994 until his death.

== Early life and education ==
Born in Observatory, Cape Town, to immigrant parents from Gujarat in western India, Omar attended Trafalgar High School in Cape Town. He was a respected member of the Muslim community. He attended the University of Cape Town and graduated with a law degree in 1957.

== Anti-apartheid activities ==
He defended members of the Pan Africanist Congress (PAC) and African National Congress (ANC) and was a member of the Unity Movement throughout the Early 70's and 80's before he joined and became a leading member of the United Democratic Front. He was a human rights activist throughout his life.

His movement was generally restricted by "banning orders" and he was detained without trial repeatedly. He also survived plots by the apartheid government to assassinate him. In 1989, he became a spokesman of Nelson Mandela, during the last months of the latter's imprisonment.

== Government minister ==
In 1994, Omar became Minister of Justice in South Africa in Nelson Mandela's ANC government, and was the first cabinet minister appointed Acting President in the absence of both the President and Deputy President from South Africa. He played a major role in transforming the South African justice system. One of his principal actions was the promulgation of the Truth and Reconciliation Commission in July 1995 to look into the crimes committed during apartheid and offer platforms for victims and their families to confront the perpetrators, who would in turn be offered amnesty for coming forward. The model served as an inspiration for other post-conflict societies in places such as Sierra Leone and Rwanda.

In 1999, following the election of Thabo Mbeki as President, Omar became the Minister of Transport, a post that he held until his death from cancer.

Of Indian descent and a lifelong resident of the Western Cape, he was married with three children, and was buried with official honours, and in accordance with Muslim rites on the day of his death.

== See also ==
- List of members of the National Assembly of South Africa who died in office
