= Ben Skosana =

South African politician (1947–2014)

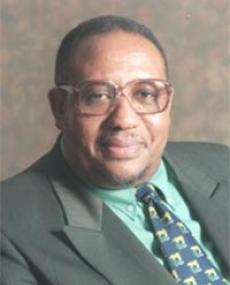

Member of the National Assembly
- In office 9 May 1994 – 11 February 2014

Minister of Correctional Services
- In office August 1998 – April 2004
- President: Nelson Mandela; Thabo Mbeki
- Preceded by: Sipo Mzimela
- Succeeded by: Ngconde Balfour

Personal details
- Born: 7 May 1947 Sharpeville, Transvaal; Union of South Africa
- Died: 11 February 2014 (aged 66) Cape Town, South Africa
- Party: Inkatha Freedom Party
- Education: Pacific Western University

Moleeane Ben Skosana (7 May 1947 – 11 February 2014) was a South African politician who served as Minister of Correctional Services from 1998 to 2004. He was a founding member of Inkatha Freedom Party (IFP) and represented the party in the National Assembly from 1994 until his death in 2014. He also served as House Chairperson of the National Assembly from 2009.

== Early life and career ==
Skosana was born on 7 May 1947 in Sharpeville in the former Transvaal. He qualified as a teacher and later completed both a bachelor's and a master's in international affairs at Pacific Western University in the United States. He was a founding member of Inkatha (later renamed the IFP) in 1975.

From 1981 to 1986, Skosana was the director of the Zululand Churches and Welfare Association, a development agency focusing on rural development in Zululand. After resigning from the agency, he became Inkatha's permanent representative in London. He returned to South Africa during the negotiations to end apartheid and was a member of the IFP's delegation to the Convention for a Democratic South Africa.

== Legislative career: 1994–2014 ==
In South Africa's first post-apartheid election in 1994, Skosana was elected to an IFP seat in the new National Assembly. Towards the end of the legislative term, in August 1998, President Nelson Mandela appointed him to replace Sipo Mzimela as Minister of Correctional Services in the multi-party Government of National Unity. Although the requirement for multi-party representation lapsed after the 1999 general election, Skosana was retained in the cabinet of Mandela's successor, President Thabo Mbeki.

After the 2004 general election, Mbeki did not reappoint Skosana but instead replaced him with Ngconde Balfour. However, Skosana remained an ordinary Member of Parliament, and, after his re-election to his seat in 2009, he was appointed as the House Chairperson in the National Assembly. He remained in that position until his death in 2014.

== Death ==
Skosana died unexpectedly on 11 February 2014 after having collapsed while having dinner with his friend, Thulas Nxesi, at a restaurant in Cape Town. He was granted a provincial official funeral.
