= Penuell Maduna =

South African politician

Minister of Justice and Constitutional Development
- In office 1999–2004
- President: Thabo Mbeki
- Preceded by: Dullah Omar
- Succeeded by: Brigitte Mabandla

Minister of Minerals and Energy
- In office 1996–1999
- President: Nelson Mandela
- Preceded by: Pik Botha
- Succeeded by: Phumzile Mlambo-Ngcuka

Deputy Minister of Home Affairs
- In office 1994–1996
- President: Nelson Mandela
- Minister: Mangosuthu Buthelezi

Personal details
- Born: Penuell Mpapa Maduna; 29 December 1952 (age 73) Johannesburg, South Africa
- Party: African National Congress
- Spouse: Nompumelelo Maduna (div. 2013)
- Occupation: Activist; politician; lawyer; businessman

Penuell Mpapa Maduna (born 29 December 1952) is a South African politician and businessman. An anti-apartheid activist in his youth, Maduna was appointed to President Nelson Mandela's government in 1994. Thereafter he served as Minister of Mineral and Energy Affairs and, between 1999 and 2004, as Minister of Justice and Constitutional Development. Holding a doctorate of law from Unisa, he was also a long-time legal adviser to his party, the African National Congress, which he represented during the negotiations to end apartheid.

His term as Justice Minister, under President Thabo Mbeki, was blighted by controversy arising from prosecutorial investigations into Deputy President Jacob Zuma on corruption charges. Maduna resigned from politics in 2004 and is now a businessman.

== Life and career ==
=== Early life ===
Born in Johannesburg on 29 December 1952, Maduna grew up in Rockville, Soweto. His mother and grandmother were both domestic workers, and the latter was a member of the African National Congress (ANC). While at the University of Zululand, he occupied leadership positions in the South African Students' Organisation, and he has cited Black Consciousness figures as influential for him during this period. He was detained and charged in the aftermath of the 1976 Soweto uprising, and, once released, spent the 1980s in exile with the ANC, which was banned inside South Africa at the time.

=== Political career ===
Maduna's exile included spells in Maputo, Mozambique, where he lived with Albie Sachs; in New York; and at the ANC headquarters in Lusaka, Zambia. In Lusaka, he was a founding member of the ANC's Constitutional Committee, and he attended many of the ANC's early consultative meetings with white South African business and civil society representatives. After the ANC was unbanned in 1990, he became part of the ANC's delegation during the formal negotiations to end apartheid. In 1991, he was elected to the National Executive Committee of the ANC, and he was re-elected in that capacity until the 2007 Polokwane conference.

When the ANC won South Africa's first democratic elections, he was appointed Deputy Minister of Home Affairs under President Nelson Mandela. In 1996, when the departure of the National Party from the transitional Government of National Unity occasioned a cabinet reshuffle, he was elevated to Ministry of Mineral and Energy Affairs. In 1999, newly elected President Thabo Mbeki appointed him Minister of Justice and Constitutional Development. He served in that office for a single term, resigning from the cabinet and from politics after the 2004 elections.

=== Career in business ===
After his retirement from politics, Maduna's first significant venture was as chairperson and part-owner of Tshwarisano, a consortium which acquired 25% of petrochemicals company Sasol in a R1.45-billion black economic empowerment deal. He has since become chairperson of SAB Zenzele, a black economic empowerment partner of South African Breweries. He has also held senior positions at law firm Bowman Gilfillan (including the vice chairmanship), and business interests in platinum mining, property, and banking.

== Personal life ==
Until 2013 he was married to businesswoman Nompumelelo Maduna, with whom he has two adult children.

== Controversies ==
=== Dispute with Auditor-General ===
In June 1997, Maduna claimed in Parliament that the Auditor-General, Henry Kluever, had covered up R170-million in theft at the Strategic Fuel Fund. The Public Protector, Selby Baqwa, subsequently found that by making this claim Maduna had "violated the spirit of the Constitution," and he recommended that disciplinary action should be taken against Maduna. A specially appointed parliamentary committee also found that Maduna's conduct had been unparliamentary and had violated parliamentary rules.

=== Spying allegations ===
In October 1997, Maduna was one of several ANC politicians whom opposition MP Patricia de Lille publicly accused of having spied for the apartheid government. She repeated the accusation – which Maduna denied – in later years.

=== Investigation of Jacob Zuma ===
In 2003, Maduna became embroiled in controversy around the National Prosecuting Authority (NPA), then led by Bulelani Ngcuka and overseen by Maduna's ministry. Amid NPA investigations into Arms Deal corruption by ANC politicians, including Deputy President Jacob Zuma, Zuma allies accused Maduna and Ngcuka of pursuing politically motivated prosecutions. ANC donor and mining magnate Brett Kebble also made various allegations against Maduna. The terms of reference of the Hefer Commission, a judicial commission of inquiry into allegations against Ngcuka, were extended to investigate whether Maduna had abused his powers at the NPA, and Maduna announced shortly afterwards that he intended to step down after the 2004 elections. The Hefer Commission did not ultimately investigate Maduna, but Maduna continued to defend Ngcuka against misconduct allegations by Zuma, leading to a highly public spat with the Public Protector Lawrence Mushwana.

== See also ==
- The Scorpions
- History of the African National Congress
