= Minister of Correctional Services (South Africa) =

Former Minister of the South African government

South Africa Minister of Correctional Services
- Flag of South Africa

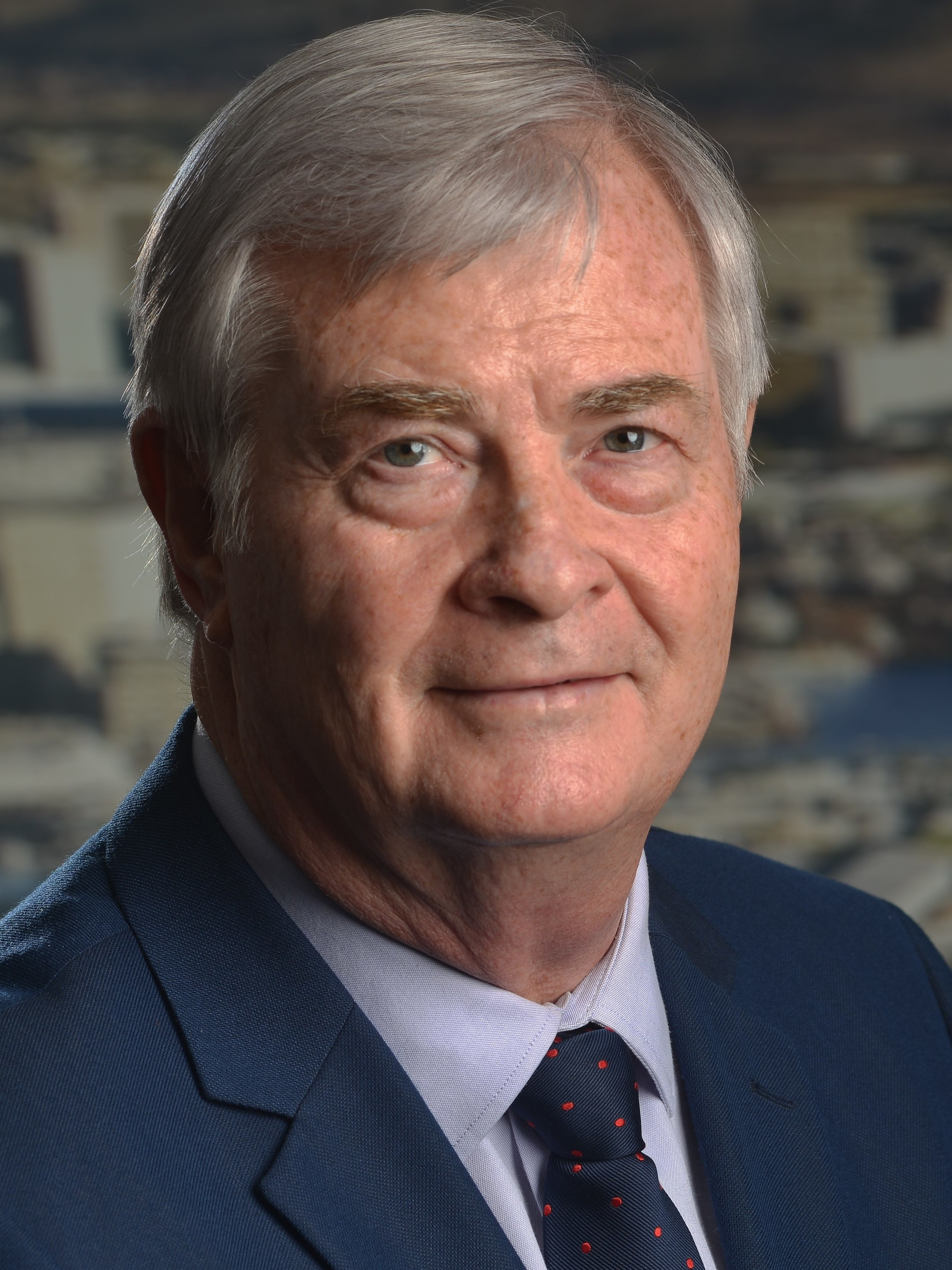
- Incumbent; Pieter Groenewald since 2 July 2024
- Department of Correctional Services
- Style: The Honourable
- Appointer: The president of South Africa
- Formation: 1991
- First holder: Adriaan Vlok
- Deputy: Lindiwe Ntshalintshali

The minister of correctional services (formerly the minister of prisons) is a minister in the Cabinet of South Africa. The minister is responsible for overseeing the Department of Correctional Services. The office was re-established in June 2024; between May 2014 and June 2024, the correctional services portfolio was the purview of the minister of justice and correctional services.

== History ==
Before 1990, correctional services were administered by the minister of justice; a separate department and ministerial portfolio were established only after extensive prison reforms were announced in 1990, under the cabinet of F.W. de Klerk. Before 1994 the minister was called the minister of prisons, and in 1994 he became the minister of correctional services.

Announcing his second cabinet in May 2014, President Jacob Zuma merged the correctional services portfolio with the justice portfolio, creating the minister of justice and correctional services. On 30 June 2024, the merger was reversed when President Cyril Ramaphosa appointed a separate minister of correctional services, Pieter Groenewald, in his third cabinet.

== List of ministers ==
List of ministers responsible for prisons, 1991–present
Portfolio	Minister	Term		Party	President
Prisons	Adriaan Vlok	1991	1994	NP	De Klerk
Correctional Services	Sipo Mzimela	1994	1998	IFP	Mandela
Correctional Services	Ben Skosana	1998	2004	IFP	Mandela; Mbeki
Correctional Services	Ngconde Balfour	2004	2009	ANC	Mbeki; Motlanthe
Correctional Services	Nosiviwe Mapisa-Nqakula	2009	2012	ANC	Zuma
Correctional Services	S'bu Ndebele	2012	2014	ANC	Zuma
Justice and Correctional Services	Michael Masutha	2014	2019	ANC	Zuma (II); Ramaphosa (I)
Justice and Correctional Services	Ronald Lamola	2019	2024	ANC	Ramaphosa (II)
Correctional Services	Pieter Groenewald	2024	–	FF+	Cyril Ramaphosa (III)
