= Steve Tshwete =

South African politician and activist

Steve Vukhile Tshwete

Minister of Safety and Security
- In office 17 June 1999 – 26 April 2002
- President: Thabo Mbeki
- Preceded by: Sydney Mufamadi
- Succeeded by: Charles Nqakula

Minister of Sport and Recreation
- In office 1994–1999
- President: Nelson Mandela
- Preceded by: New post
- Succeeded by: Ngconde Balfour

Personal details
- Born: Steve Vukhile Tshwete; 12 November 1938 Springs, Transvaal Province
- Died: 26 April 2002 (aged 63) Pretoria, Gauteng
- Party: African National Congress
- Spouse: Pamela MaMzangwa
- Children: Lindela, Mayihlome, Yonda and Mandlakazi
- Education: University of South Africa

Steve Vukhile Tshwete (12 November 1938 – 26 April 2002) was a South African politician and activist with the African National Congress. Involved in Umkhonto we Sizwe, Tshwete was imprisoned by the apartheid authorities on Robben Island from February 1964 to 1978. Tshwete resumed activities with the ANC and become a regional coordinator for the new United Democratic Front. He later lived in exile in Zambia. After the first free elections in South Africa in 1994, he became the new government's first Sports Minister and later was Minister of Safety and Security.

== Early life ==
Tshwete was born in Springs, East Rand, on 12 November 1938 to Xhosa parents. He was the eldest of four siblings. While still a baby his parents moved to Peelton (Nkonkqweni), a black township near King William’s Town, Eastern Cape. He was taught to read by his mother before starting primary school. His political interests were awakened reading the Xhosa newspaper Imvo Zabantsundu in his youth. He attended Forbes Grant Secondary School in King William's Town and was introduced to the ANC through its publications given out by the principal, Mr. H. Mjamba, and at Welsh High in East London he joined the ANC's African Students' Association. When he left school he continued his work with the ANC.

== Political background ==
As a member of Umkhonto we Sizwe (MK) Border regional command, he was arrested in June 1963 and sentenced in February 1964 to fifteen years in jail for belonging to a banned organization. He spent his prison time on Robben Island and completed a Bachelor of Arts, majoring in English and Philosophy from University of South Africa (UNISA). On Robben Island, with his interest in rugby, he organised the prisoners into rugby teams and created a league. He was released in March 1978 and returned to his homeland and became a teacher. By 1983, he became politically active again and joined the United Democratic Front (UDF) becoming the president of the Eastern Cape region. He was arrested that year by the Ciskein police and held for four months and then constantly harassed until he left South Africa for the ANC in exile. He was first in Maseru, Lesotho, and by 1985 he was in Lusaka, Zambia, resuming his military training with MK.

He became a political commissar in MK in August 1987 and authorized the ANC military units in South Africa to attack white civilians by means of a bombing campaign of restaurants and nightclubs in Johannesburg, Pretoria, and Durban. The ANC National Executive Committee distanced themselves from the attacks in August 1988 after the attacks had been condemned by anti-apartheid leaders and church groups usually sympathetic to the ANC cause. Tshwete was transferred from his position as a political commissar in MK and he obtained an appointment in the National Executive. During the 1987, Tshwete was involved in the talks, in Dakar, Senegal and Paris, France when white businessmen, Afrikaner intellectuals and leading South African opposition members met the ANC for discussions.

He returned to South Africa after the ANC was unbanned in 1990 as a member of their National Executive and negotiating team. After the ANC won the first free election in 1994, Nelson Mandela appointed him as his Minister of Sports, a position he held from 1994 until 1999. He was tasked with overseeing South Africa's re-entry into international sport, establish development programs for underprivileged blacks sportsmen and women in all sports including rugby and cricket, and de-racializing the national sport teams.

As the head of the ANC's Sports Desk he had the task of uniting sports that had been riven by apartheid. He had the knack of "bringing sworn enemies to the negotiating table and sending them away as allies ... he went from one sporting code to the next and fixed the potholes on their roads to unity". Having united South Africa's cricket bodies he travelled with Ali Bacher to London in May 1991 and successfully applied for South Africa's admission to the International Cricket Council. He started the first Governor's Cup Yacht Race from Cape Town to Saint Helena in 1996.

On the retirement of Nelson Mandela, he served in Thabo Mbeki's first government as the Minister of Safety and Security from 1999 until his death in April 2002. He was tasked with restoring the morale of an undermanned, underpaid police force beset with a political history of maintaining apartheid, riddled with corruption and a huge escalation of violent crime in the country.

On 24 April 2001, Tshwete, in his capacity of Minister of Safety and Security, announced, on national television, an investigation into an alleged plot to oust the country's president, Thabo Mbeki, by three high-ranking members of the ANC. They were identified as Cyril Ramaphosa, Tokyo Sexwale and Mathews Phosa. The opposition party, the Democratic Alliance, described the investigation as an abuse of government powers and a method to neutralize opponents as Mbeki sought a second term as president. The three men were cleared in December 2001 when Tshwete announced the results of the investigation and apologised to the men and their families.

== Honours ==
Steve Tshwete Local Municipality in Mpumalanga Province is named after him.

Order of Luthuli in silver (2004)

== Death ==
It is said he had developed back pain back in March 2002 and began using a wheelchair. He was admitted to Voortrekkerhoogte's 1 Military Hospital in Pretoria with pneumonia and liver failure which occurred after an operation for a spinal problem. He was survived by his wife Pamela, sons Lindela, Mayihlome and daughters Mandlakazi and Yonda. He was honoured with a state funeral on 4 May 2002 and national flags were flown at half-mast.
