= Nosipho Makamba-Botya =

South African politician

Member of the National Assembly of South Africa
- In office 14 June 2023 – 21 May 2024
- Preceded by: Luvuyo Tafeni

Member of the Western Cape Provincial Parliament
- In office 22 May 2019 – 28 January 2023

Personal details
- Born: Nosipho Makamba-Botya
- Party: Economic Freedom Fighters
- Profession: Politician

Nosipho Makamba-Botya is a South African politician who served as a member of the National Assembly of South Africa from June 2023 until May 2024, and represented the Economic Freedom Fighters (EFF). She previously served as an EFF councillor in the City of Cape Town and before that as a Member of the Western Cape Provincial Parliament. She became an MPP in May 2019 and served as the party's chief whip. Makamba-Botya was also the deputy chairperson of the EFF in the province.

On 28 January 2023, Makamba-Botya alongside fellow EFF MPP Melikhaya Xego resigned from the provincial parliament. She was subsequently sworn in as a City of Cape Town councillor on 14 February 2023. After a short tenure in council, Makamba-Botya was sworn in as a Member of the National Assembly on 14 June 2023.
