= Melikhaya Xego =

South African politician

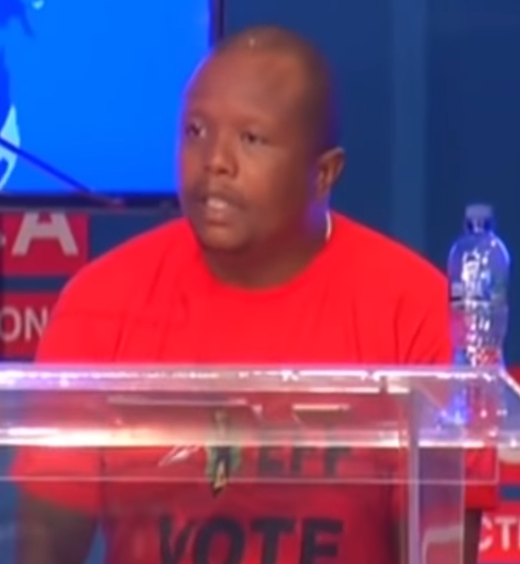

Member of the Western Cape Provincial Parliament
- In office 22 May 2019 – 28 January 2023

Personal details
- Born: Alice, Cape Province
- Party: Economic Freedom Fighters
- Occupation: Politician

Melikhaya Xego is a South African politician. A member of the Economic Freedom Fighters (EFF), he served as a Member of the Western Cape Provincial Parliament from 22 May 2019 until 28 January 2023. He is the former Provincial Chairperson of the party.

== Life and career ==
Xego was born in the town of Alice in the now-dissolved Cape Province.

He served as the Provincial Organiser of the EFF until November 2014 when he was designated to the post of Provincial Secretary. He soon succeeded Bernard Joseph as the Provincial Chairperson of the party.

For the 2014 general elections, Xego was a candidate for the Western Cape Provincial Parliament. Due to the party's electoral performance, he was not elected.

In August 2016, Xego was elected to the Cape Town City Council and inaugurated as a councillor on 10 August 2016. The EFF caucus elected him as a party whip.

In May 2019, Xego was elected to the Western Cape Provincial Parliament as the EFF's support in the provincial election increased. The party had gained one seat, bringing the party's caucus to two seats in the 6th Provincial Parliament. He was sworn into office on 22 May 2019, and failed to serve a full term in office. Xego's resignation was submitted to Speaker Daylin Mitchell on 28 January 2023. Xego was the party's caucus leader and served alongside Nosipho Makamba-Botya who would later also resign alongside him.
