= Tourism in South Africa =

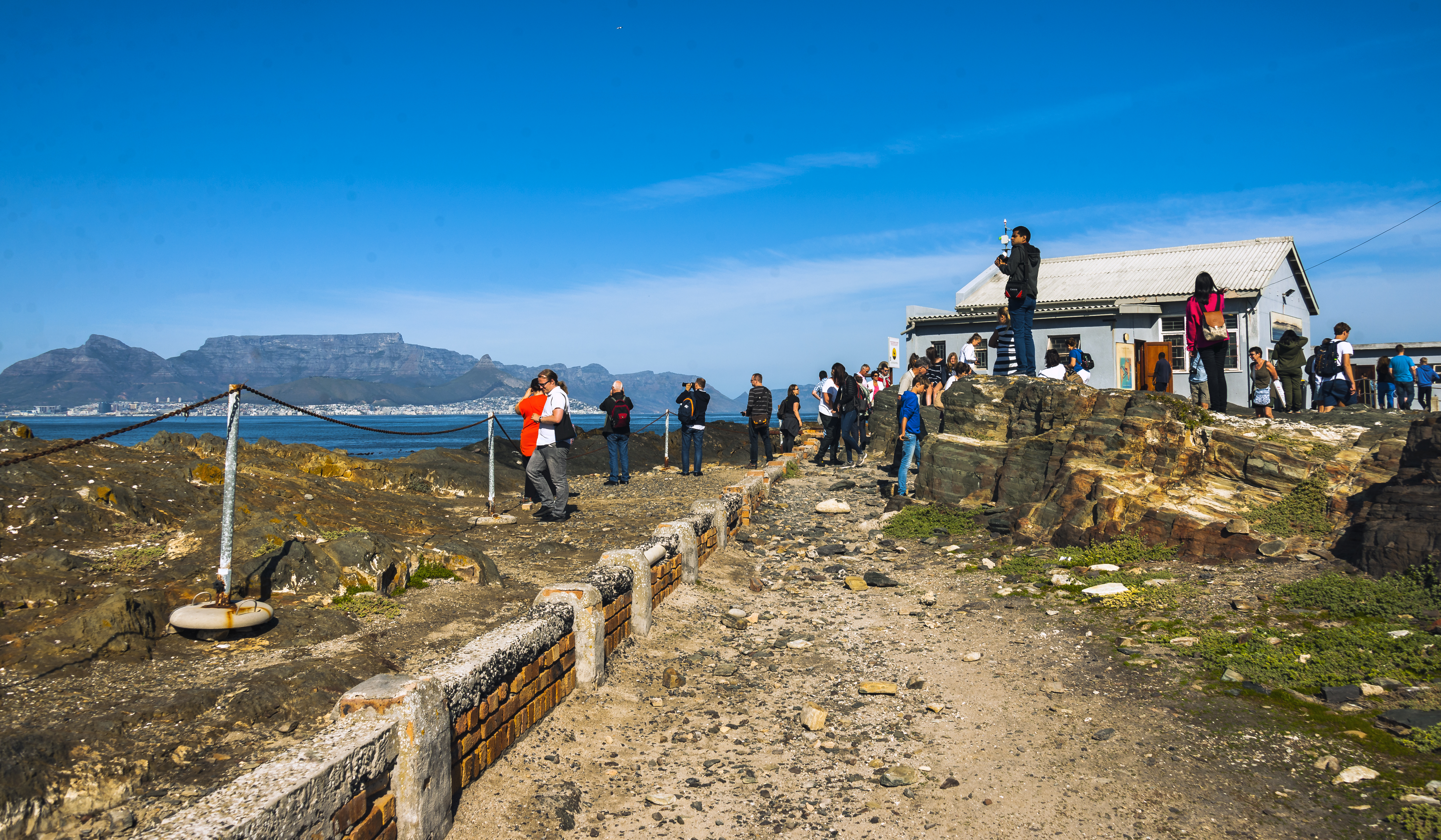
Tourists taking in the view of Cape Town and Table Mountain, from Robben Island

South Africa is a major global tourist destination, with the tourism industry accounting for 5.8% of the country's GDP as of May 2026, according to Statistics South Africa (Stats SA).

In 2025, South Africa's international passenger arrivals reached a record 10.5 million people. This was up from 8.92 million the year before.

In 2025, South Africa was rated as the 4th best country in the world for tourism, as well as the best in the Africa and Indian Ocean region, by The Telegraph.

According to the World Travel & Tourism Council (WTTC), the tourism industry directly contributed R102 billion to South Africa's GDP in 2012, and supports 10.3% of the country's employment. 1.8 million people were employed in South Africa's tourism sector in early 2025, and this number is expected to grow significantly over the coming few years.

South Africa offers both domestic and international tourists a wide variety of options, among others the picturesque natural landscape and game reserves, diverse cultural heritage and highly regarded wines. Some of the most popular destinations include several national parks, such as the expansive Kruger National Park in the north of the country, the coastlines and beaches of the KwaZulu-Natal and Western Cape provinces, and the major cities of Cape Town, Durban, and Johannesburg.

The top five overseas countries with the largest number of tourists visiting South Africa in 2017 were the United States, the United Kingdom, Germany, the Netherlands, and France. Most of the tourists arriving in South Africa from elsewhere in Africa came from Southern African Development Community (SADC) countries. In terms of tourists from SADC countries, Zimbabwe topped the list at 31%, followed by Lesotho, Mozambique, Eswatini, and Botswana. In addition, Nigeria was the country of origin for nearly 30% of tourists arriving in South Africa.

== Attractions ==
=== Biodiversity and ecotourism ===
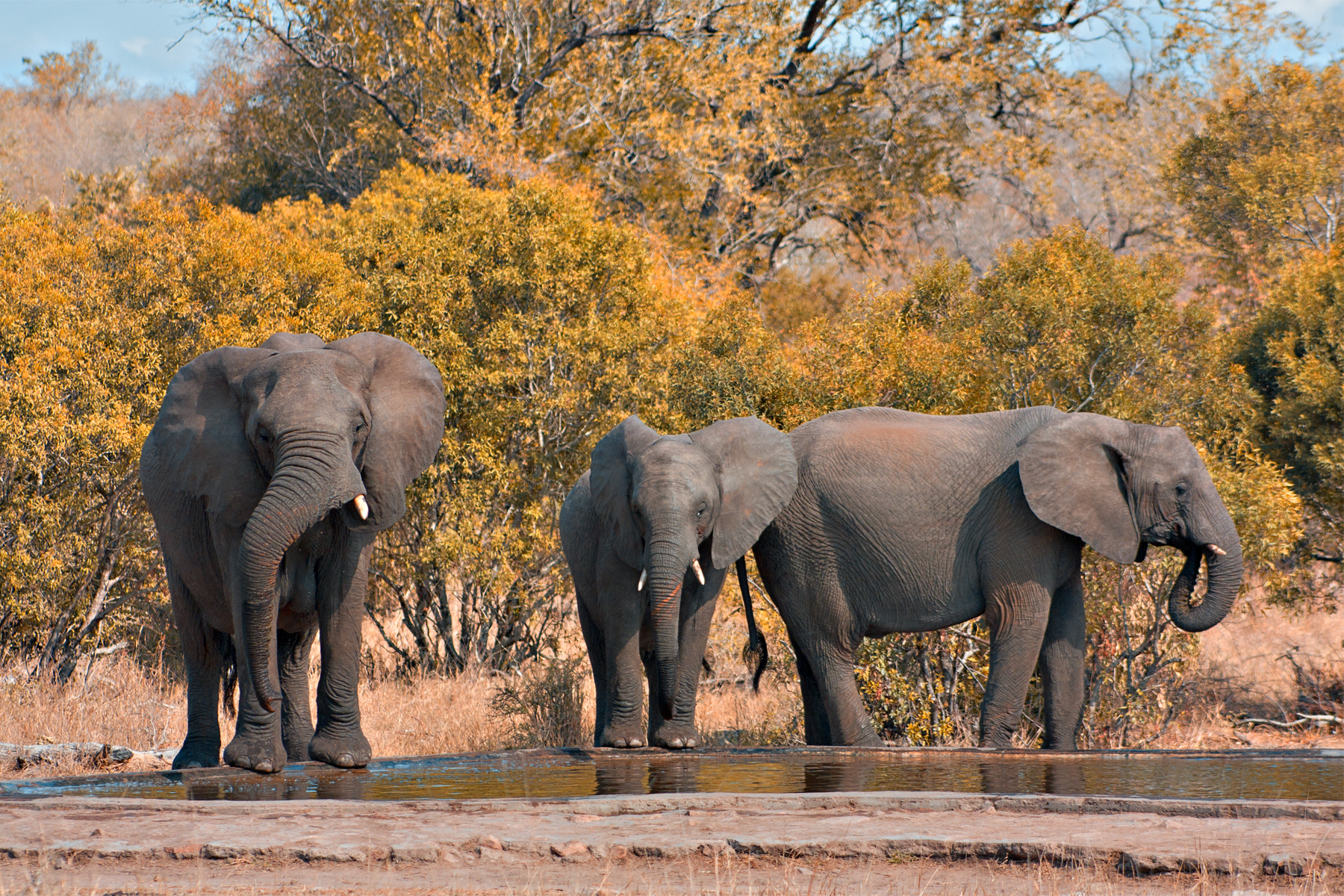
Elephant family at an artificial waterhole in the Kruger National Park, in Mpumalanga

South Africa is ranked nineteenth out of the world's twenty megadiverse countries South Africa is home to a large variety of animal life. Among the large mammals found in the northern bushveld include lions, leopards, cheetahs, white rhinoceroses, blue wildebeest, kudus, impalas, hyenas, hippopotamuses and giraffes. A significant extent of the bushveld exists in the north-east, including the Kruger National Park, one of the largest game reserves in Africa, and the Sabi Sand Game Reserve.

The Kruger National Park, established in 1926, is one of the most visited national parks in the country, with a total of 1,659,793 visitors in the 2014/15 period. The region is also home to nearly 80 percent of the world's rhino population. Due to COVID-19 restrictions impeding tourism and movement in the region, the killings of rhino species in South Africa have fallen by 53 percent in 2020.

The country is also particularly rich in plant diversity, with a wide variety of biomes found across the country. These include the grasslands in the Highveld, the succulent Karoo in central South Africa, and the endemic fynbos biome, constituting the majority of the area and plant life in the Cape floristic region of the Western Cape. This rare vegetation is protected as part of the Table Mountain National Park (which also includes the iconic flat-topped Table Mountain), which was the most-visited national park in South Africa in 2014/15, with a total of 2,677,767 visitors.

==== Ecotourism ====
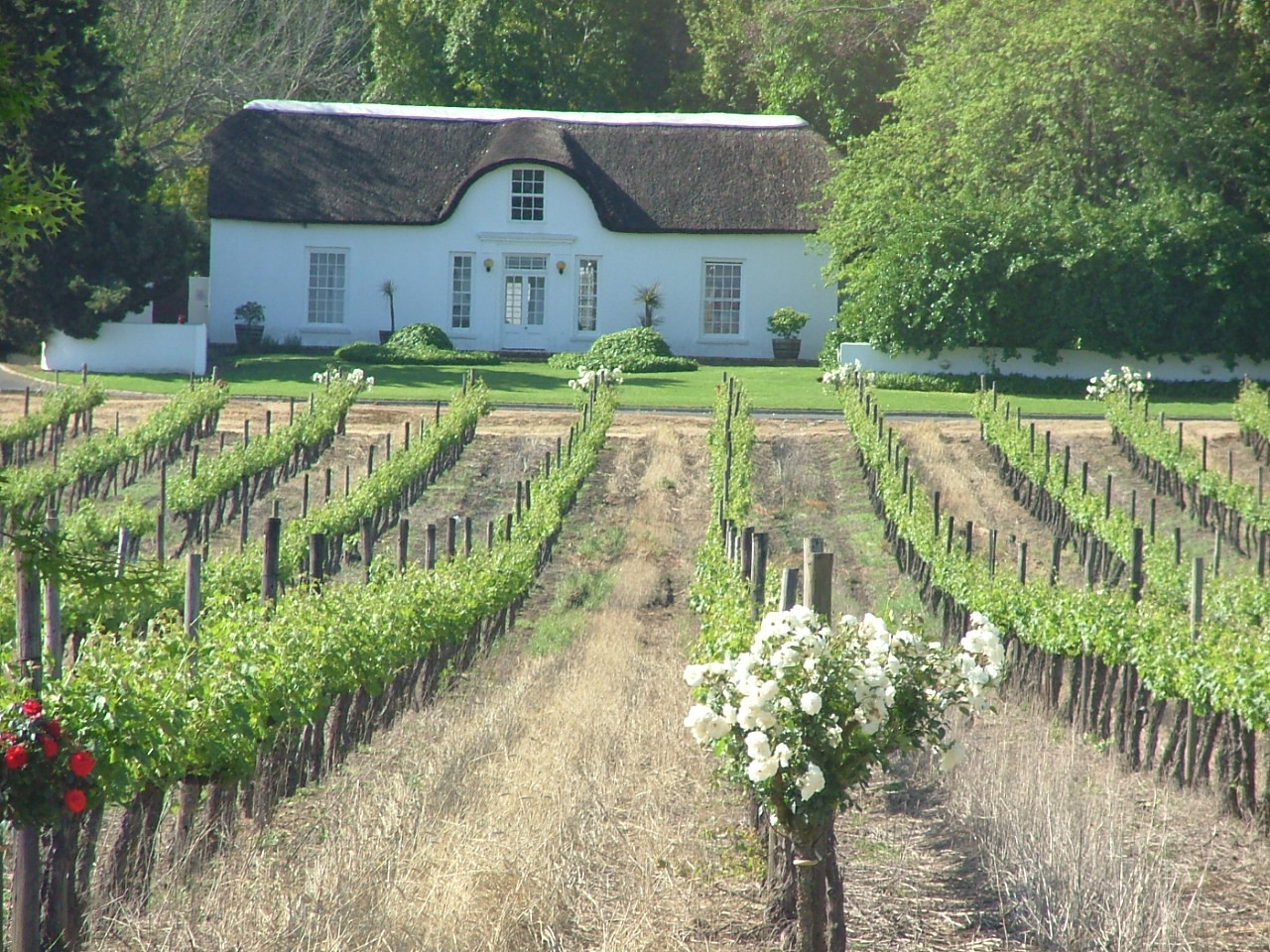
A vineyard in Franschhoek, Western Cape

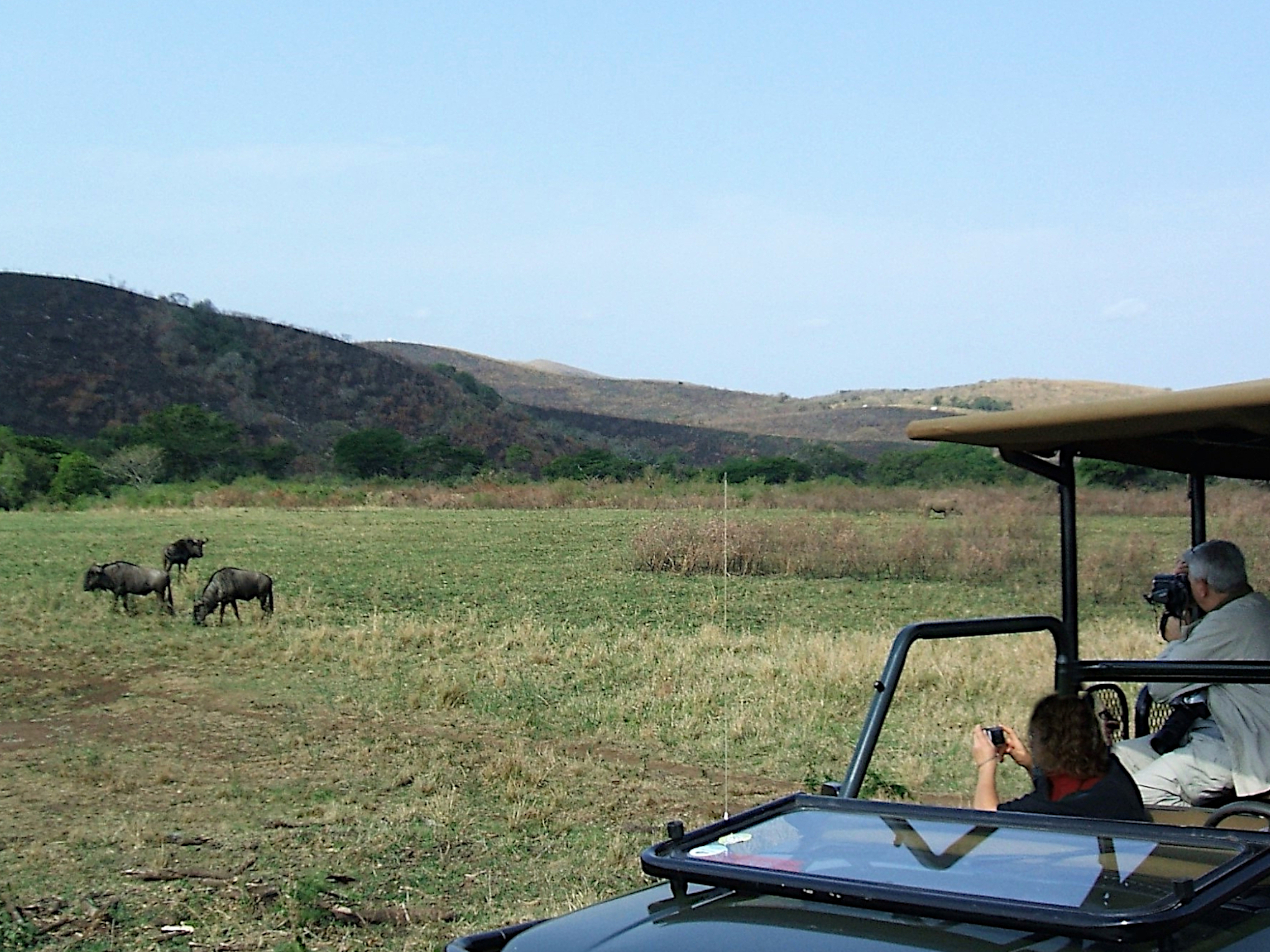
Tourists on safari in Kapama Game Reserve.

Ecotourism is the concept of responsible travel to areas that might be protected, and possibly rated as especially fragile. The intent behind ecotourism is to create as little detrimental impact on the environment as possible.

As one of the world's few megadiverse countries, South Africa has used ecotourism to sustain and improve its immense biodiversity, as well as invigorate its economy. Tourism is the fourth largest generator of foreign exchange in South Africa, and ecotourism is the idea of encouraging visitors while promoting and supporting a country's biodiversity.

South Africa contains an immense degree of biodiversity, and thus, ecotourism is a way for the country to benefit from wildlife in a non-consumptive and legal manner, as opposed to allowing illegal activities like poaching and trafficking for the international wildlife trade - things which are strictly prohibited, and actively prevented in the country.

=== Cultural attractions ===
In addition to its numerous natural attractions, South Africa also boasts numerous attractions of cultural significance. These include the fossil-bearing caves forming part of the Cradle of Humankind in Gauteng, the ruins of the Kingdom of Mapungubwe in northern Limpopo, the wine routes of the Western Cape, and various historical sites in the cities of Cape Town and Johannesburg (such as Robben Island, the Castle of Good Hope and Soweto township).

=== UNESCO World Heritage Sites ===
Ten South African sites are inscribed on the UNESCO World Heritage List, including the iSimangaliso Wetland Park and uKhahlamba Drakensberg Park in KwaZulu-Natal. There are five Cultural WHS, four Natural WHS and 1 mixed WHS.

Location of World Heritage Sites within South Africa.

== Statistics ==
Yearly tourist arrivals in millions

The number of tourists increased to 10.5 million in 2025, from 8.92 million in 2024.

=== Foreign arrivals by year ===
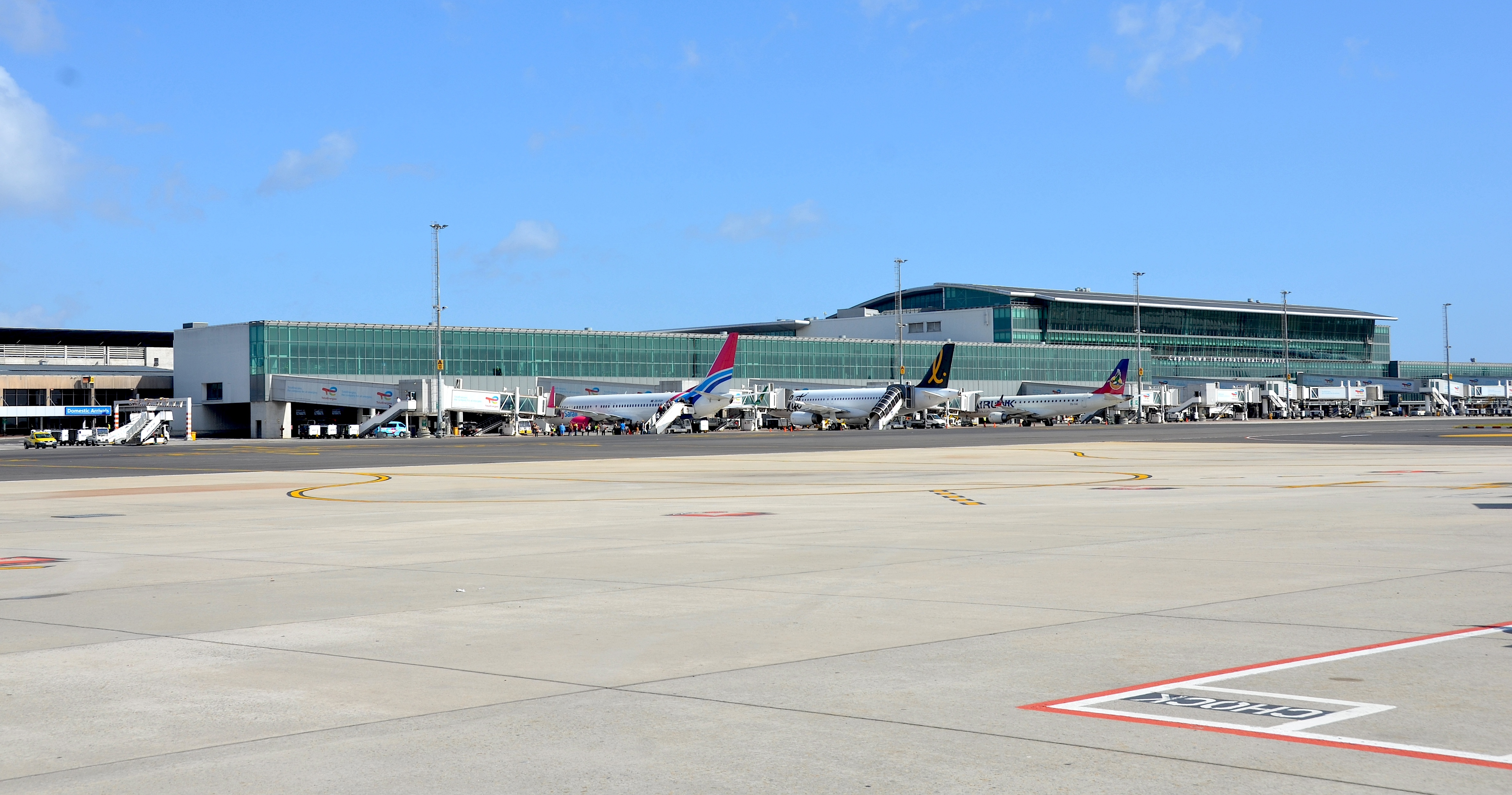
Cape Town International Airport caters to a large number of tourists each year

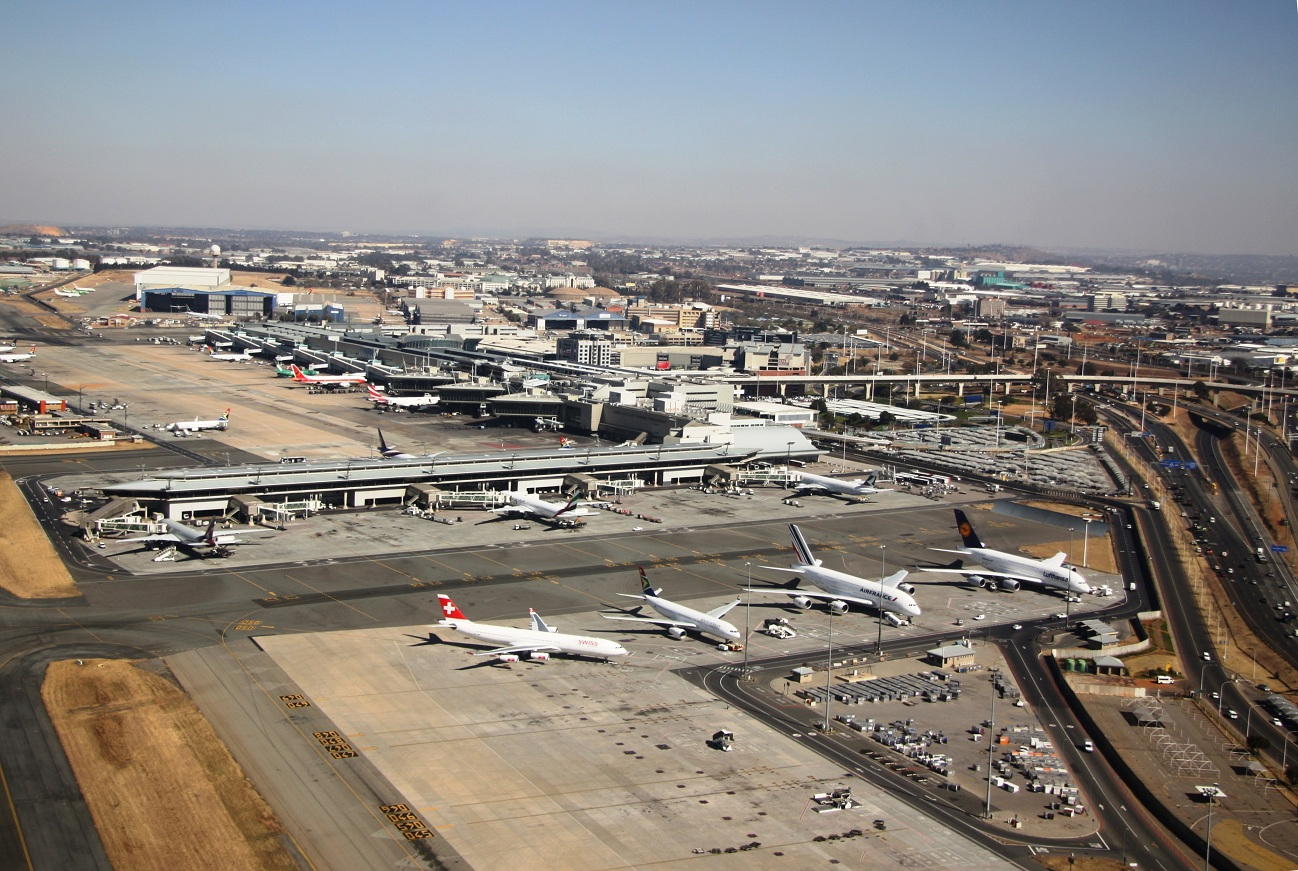
The OR Tambo International Airport in Johannesburg is one of the main ports of entry into the country

Foreign traveller arrivals (2000–2025)
Year	Foreign arrivals (in thousands)	Year	Foreign Arrivals (in thousands)	Year	Foreign Arrivals (in thousands)
2000	6,001	2009	10,098	2018	15,940
2001	5,908	2010	11,575	2019	15,825
2002	6,550	2011	12,496	2020	4,586
2003	6,640	2012	13,796	2021	3,150
2004	6,815	2013	15,155	2022	8,026
2005	7,518	2014	15,092	2023	11,655
2006	8,509	2015	15,052	2024	11,729
2007	9,208	2016	16,158	2025	14,183
2008	9,729	2017	15,991		

=== Tourist arrivals by country ===
Tourist arrivals of Top 10 SADC countries						Tourist arrivals of Top 10 overseas countries					
Rank (2025)	Country of origin	2025		2015		Rank (2025)	Country of origin	2025		2015	
Rank (2025)	Country of origin	Arrivals	%	Arrivals	%	Rank (2025)	Country of origin	Arrivals	%	Arrivals	%
1	Zimbabwe	2,307,196	29.2	1,900,791	28.9	1	United Kingdom	403,714	16.9	407,486	19.0
2	Mozambique	2,078,635	26.3	1,200,335	18.3	2	United States	391,939	16.4	297,226	13.9
3	Lesotho	1,395,346	17.7	1,394,913	21.2	3	Germany	290,795	12.2	256,646	12.0
4	Eswatini	958,716	12.1	838,006	12.7	4	Netherlands	140,338	5.9	121,883	5.7
5	Botswana	418,474	5.3	593,514	9.0	5	France	135,007	5.6	128,438	6.0
6	Malawi	230,640	2.9	135,260	2.1	6	Australia	121,361	5.1	99,205	4.6
7	Namibia	175,588	2.2	212,514	3.2	7	India	69,680	2.9	78,385	3.7
8	Zambia	175,165	2.2	161,259	2.5	8	Canada	65,744	2.7	56,224	2.6
9	Tanzania	44,293	0.6	35,817	0.5	9	Brazil	63,848	2.7		
10	Angola	41,718	0.5	48,416	0.7	10	Italy	55,947	2.3	52,377	2.4
						–	China	37,902	1.6	84,691	3.9

Foreign tourist arrivals in 2024
Rank	Country	Arrivals
1	Zimbabwe	2,183,260
2	Mozambique	1,591,751
3	Lesotho	974,369
4	Eswatini	842,318
5	Botswana	395,965
6	United States	372,362
7	United Kingdom	349,883
8	Germany	254,992
9	Malawi	163,726
10	Netherlands	132,422
11	France	125,823
12	Australia	98,544
13	India	75,541
14	Canada	58,057
15	Italy	50,780
16	Brazil	49,855
17	Kenya	47,852
18	Belgium	45,225
19	Switzerland	42,255
20	China	41,418
Others		1,022,972
Total		8,919,370

== Governance ==
The tourism industry in South Africa is managed by the Department of Tourism. The department is headed up by the Minister of Tourism; a position held since 2023 by leader of the GOOD party, Patricia de Lille.

The Department had a budget in the 2024/2025 fiscal year of R2.3 billion. This is allocated to the country's national marketing agency (which received R1.2 billion in the same year), and programs like the Expanded Public Works Programme (EPWP) and Tourism Incentive Programmes (TIP).

The official national marketing agency of the South African government, with the goal of promoting tourism in South Africa both locally and globally is known as South African Tourism (SA Tourism).

Certain provinces and cities have their own tourism marketing agencies, tasked with similar responsibilities, but for their local jurisdictions. Examples are Wesgro in the Western Cape and Cape Town Tourism in Cape Town.

== Contribution to GDP ==
Tourism in South Africa contributes a significant amount of money towards the country's GDP. In May 2025, according to Statistics South Africa (StatsSA), the tourism industry accounted for 3.3% of South Africa's GDP. This is up from 2.3% in 2019.

The total nominal GDP of the South African economy in 2024 was R7.3 trillion. Therefore, the South African tourism industry contributed an annual total of around R241 billion to the country's economy around the same time.

Taking the Department of Tourism's 2024/2025 fiscal year budget of R2.3 billion into account, the return on investment for the Department sits at around over 100 times.

== Visa policy ==
Visa policy of South Africa South Africa Visa-free access to South Africa for 90 days Visa-free access to South Africa for 30 days Visa required for ordinary passports; Visa-free access for diplomatic, official and service passports Visa required for entry to South Africa for all passports

Visitors to South Africa must obtain a visa from one of the South African diplomatic missions unless they come from one of the visa exempt countries, in which case they get what is called a "Port of Entry Visa". Visitors who require a visa must apply in person and provide biometric data.

== History of tourism in South Africa ==
=== Prior to the democratic elections of 1994 ===
If you can't put up with petty apartheid, don't go. The burden is on visitors to adapt to separate buses, doorways, post office windows, elevators, beaches, and toilets for people of separate skin color.

Before the end of apartheid, the nation was not largely celebrated as a tourist destination. As a result of the political unrest, the country faced difficulty in creating a highly-functioning tourism industry. Though the numbers indicate there was active tourism, it was not expansive and faced hardships as a result of the politics of the period.

The Traveler's Africa: A Guide to the Entire Continent reported in 1973 that South Africa was receiving 20,000 Americans a year, though even then the country was a controversial destination. The book goes on to report that the visitors were carefully screened to keep out journalists and similar undesirables, and that "irritating foreigners" were regularly deported.

=== Years following democracy ===
In the years following the multiracial democratic election of 1994, South Africa opened its tourism horizons by hosting a variety of worldwide events including the 1995 Rugby World Cup, and the 2010 FIFA World Cup. The hosting of these events helped bolster South Africa's image and national identity.

After apartheid, there was an emergence of black-owned bed and breakfast establishments in the South African tourism industry. These establishments mainly exist in former "black spaces", also known as townships. These bed and breakfast locations mainly benefit from domestic tourism in South Africa. The national government sought to bolster black economic empowerment and the general structure of ownership in the tourism industry. Places such as Alexandra have become part of an initiative of "township tourism". The concept is meant to develop the townships by sharing their history and celebrating their culture with tourists.

South Africa, however, failed in their bid to host the 2004 Summer Olympics. Researchers have cited logistical and political reasons as to why the bid failed. For example, Cape Town was behind in the necessary means to support an event the size of the Olympics financially. Political reasons were also prevalent in the eventual failure of the bid as the committee was all-white and the motive to create a national identity seemed like a false promise to the majority black population of South Africa.

The Bid Committee had issues of reconciliation and accusations of racism specifically between Raymond Ackerman, a wealthy white man who led the bid, and Sam Ramsamy who was of Indian descent. Therefore, in an attempt to enhance the tourism industry through an Olympics bid, the challenge of cohesive action posed a great threat.

The 2010 FIFA World Cup is an example of a more successful route by South Africa to increase tourism and influence the nation positively. Firstly, the event helped to bolster South Africa's global brand and image. One of the main objectives in South Africa's attempt to host such events was to positively influence its national identity and erase the negative image of apartheid set forth prior to the nation's gradual shift to become the self-proclaimed "Rainbow Nation".

Some examples of SA reinventing itself through the tourism industry include the Apartheid Museum in Johannesburg, District Six Museum in Cape Town, and former prisons turned into powerful museums, such as Constitution Hill and Robben Island, which now attract many tourists each year.

=== Recent developments ===
In October 2025, Tourism Minister Patricia de Lille announced that for the first six months of 2025, tourism in South Africa had increased by 15.8% compared to the year before. Middle Eastern arrivals increased by 82.2%, Central and South American arrivals increased by 63.6%, Australasian arrivals increased by 38.0%, African land arrivals increased by 31.8%, and European arrivals increased by 20.8%. The increase in tourism numbers comes as SA prepares to roll out its Electronic Travel Authorization (ETA). The Minister said the country had a goal of 15 million visitors by 2030.

== See also ==
- Visa policy of South Africa
- South African Tourism
- Department of Tourism (South Africa)
- Minister of Tourism (South Africa)
