= Cape Town Tourism =

Official tourism agency for Cape Town

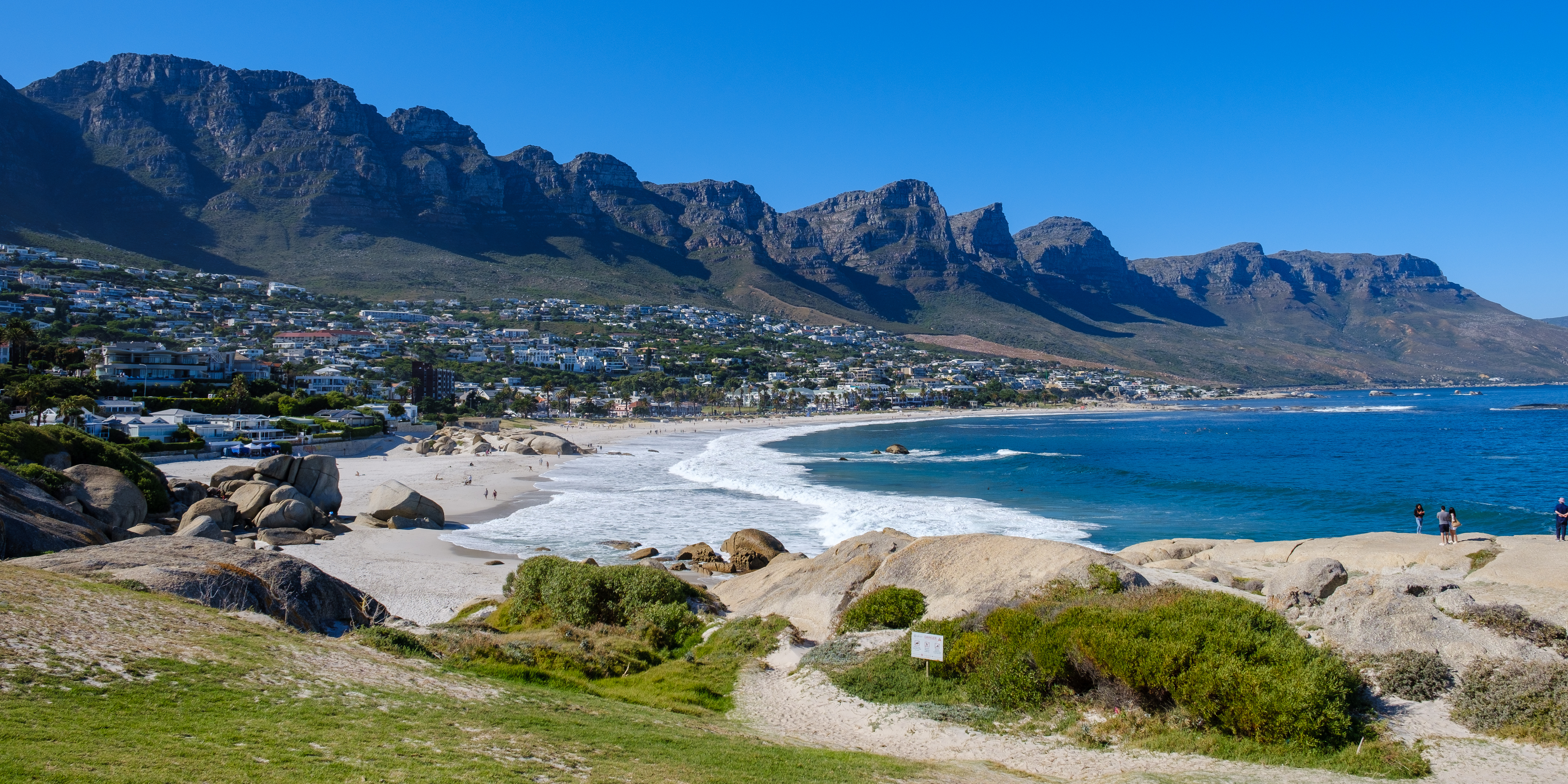
- Cape Town has a plethora of beautiful beaches, and a warm, Mediterranean climate. Pictured here is Camps Bay, in the Atlantic Seaboard region of the city
- Type: Nonprofit
- Industry: Tourism; Travel; Hospitality; Marketing
- Founded: June 2004; 22 years ago
- Headquarters: Cape Town, South Africa
- Area served: Cape Town
- Key people: Tracy Mkhize (Chairperson); Enver Duminy (CEO)
- Services: Tourism promotion
- Revenue: R62.8 million (2022)
- Divisions: Responsible Tourism; Travel Wise
- Website: capetown.travel

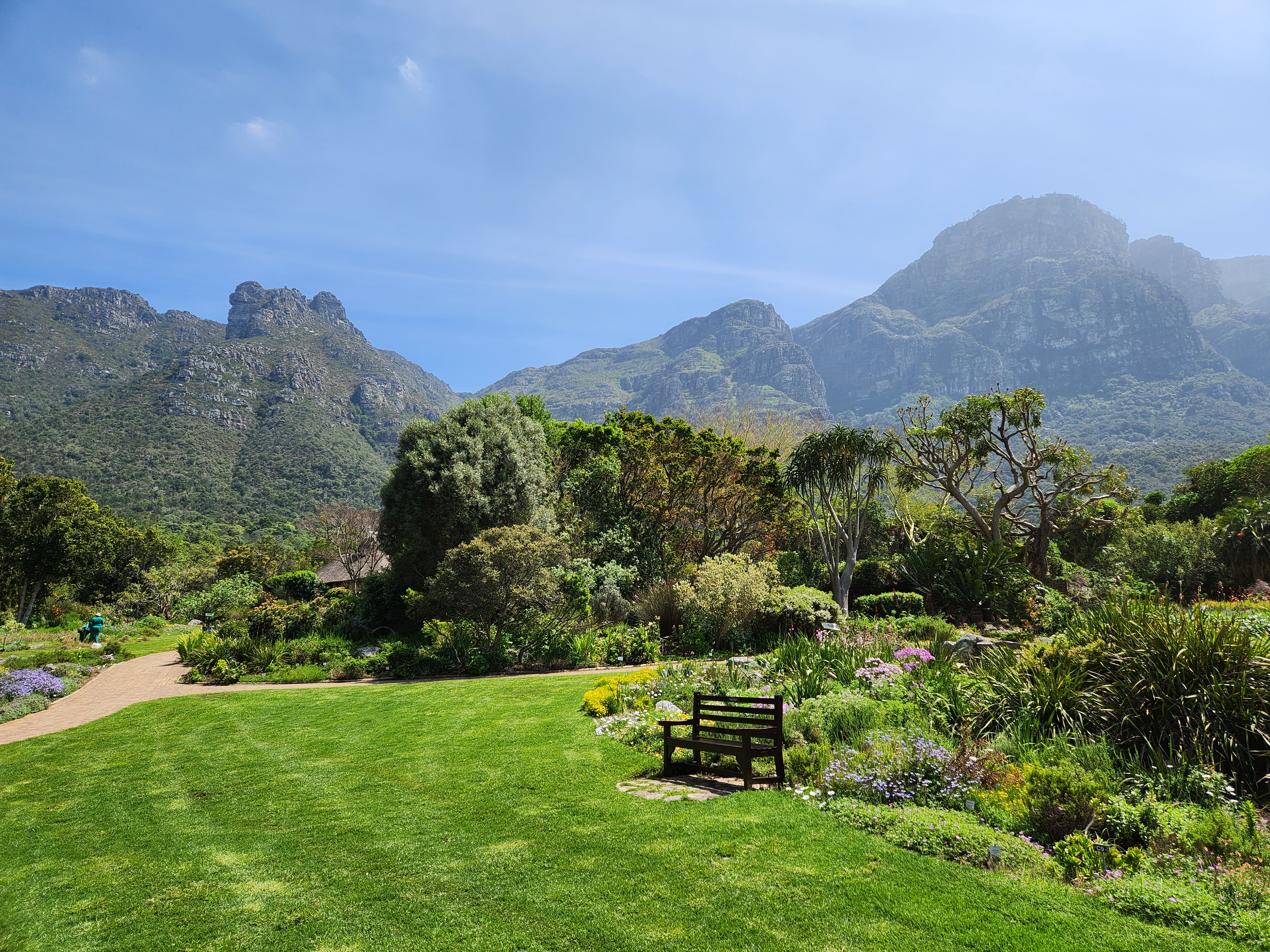
The lush Kirstenbosch National Botanical Garden offers visitors 5 of South Africa's 6 biomes, and many indigenous flora which are part of the extremely biodiverse Cape Floristic Kingdom

Cape Town Tourism (CTT) is a nonprofit, and the official tourism agency for the city of Cape Town, South Africa.

Founded in 2004, the organization is funded by the City of Cape Town metropolitan municipality, and is tasked with promoting and advocating for travel to Cape Town, by both locals and international visitors.

The agency also operates Visitor Information Centers around Cape Town, a telephonic information center for information pertaining to travel to the city, and a website (Cape Town Travel), which features travel guides, maps, recommendations, and partner resources.

Furthermore, Cape Town Tourism studies the local tourism market, reports on tourism data, and communicates tourism market information to industry, as well as the City, so as to inform development policies.

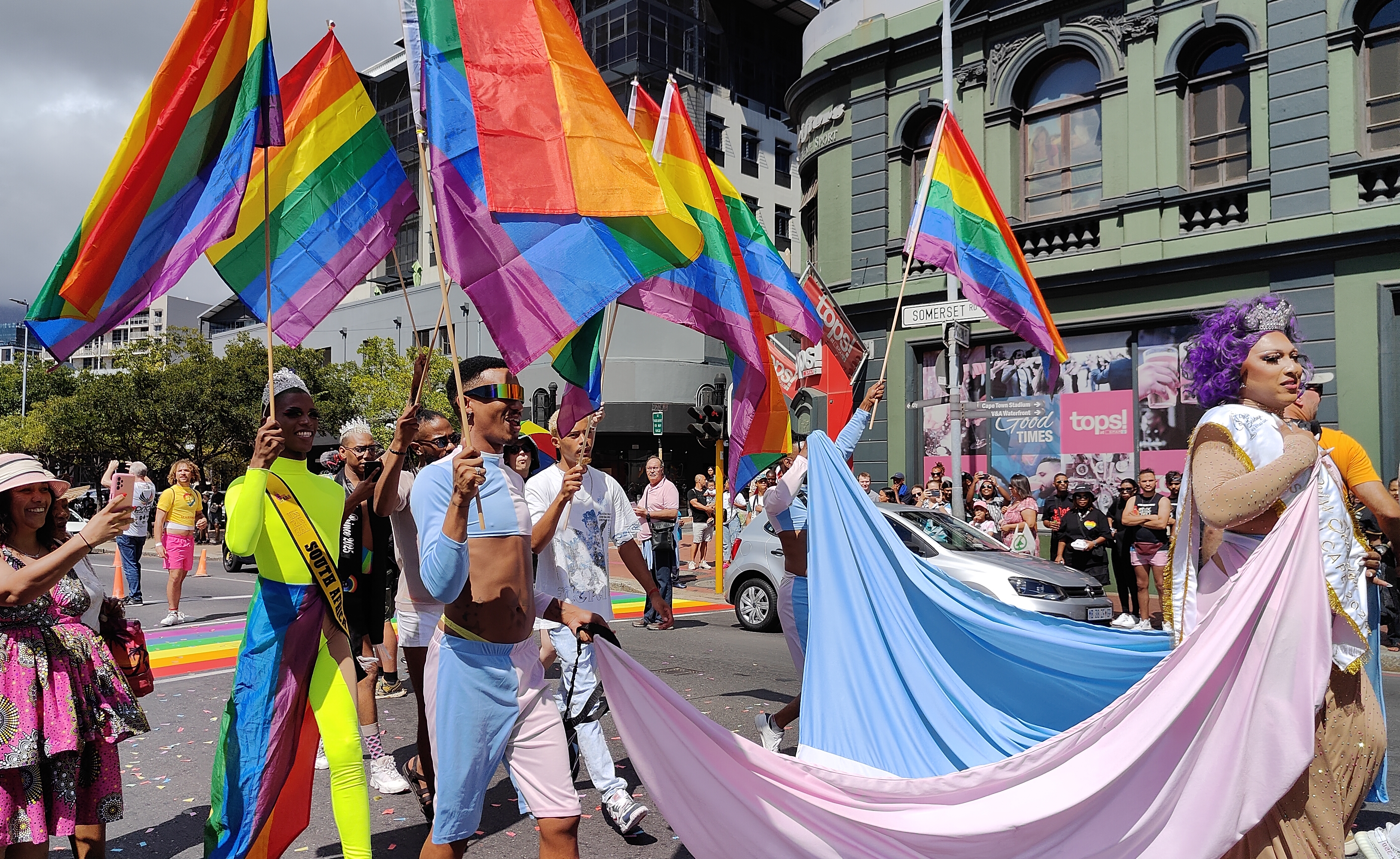
Cape Town, Africa's gay tourism hub, hosts the annual Cape Town Pride festival. The city's gay village, De Waterkant, offers visitors a Pink Lane tour of local LGBTQ+ establishments, and insights into the diversity and strength of the community

== History ==
Cape Town Tourism was founded in June 2004, when six local tourism bureaus were consolidated into a single organization with the goal of serving the Cape Town metro area.

In May 2025, the City of Cape Town's Mayoral Committee recommended the appointment of Cape Town Tourism as the City’s official destination marketing organization for a further 3 years.

At the time, the City's Mayoral Committee Member (MCM) for Economic Growth stated that working with Cape Town Tourism was one of the City’s most valuable in-roads to the tourism industry, and that CTT helps the City shape its tourism landscape in ways that create jobs and support its economy.

The MCM further said that the tourism sector contributed an estimated R27.3 billion to Cape Town's local economy in 2023, supported approximately 91,000 direct jobs, and was a vital pillar of the city's growth strategy.

Also in May 2025, at the African Travel Indaba, Cape Town Tourism launched its 2025/26 Visitor Guide. The guide highlights the city's diverse cultural offerings and commitment to inclusive tourism.

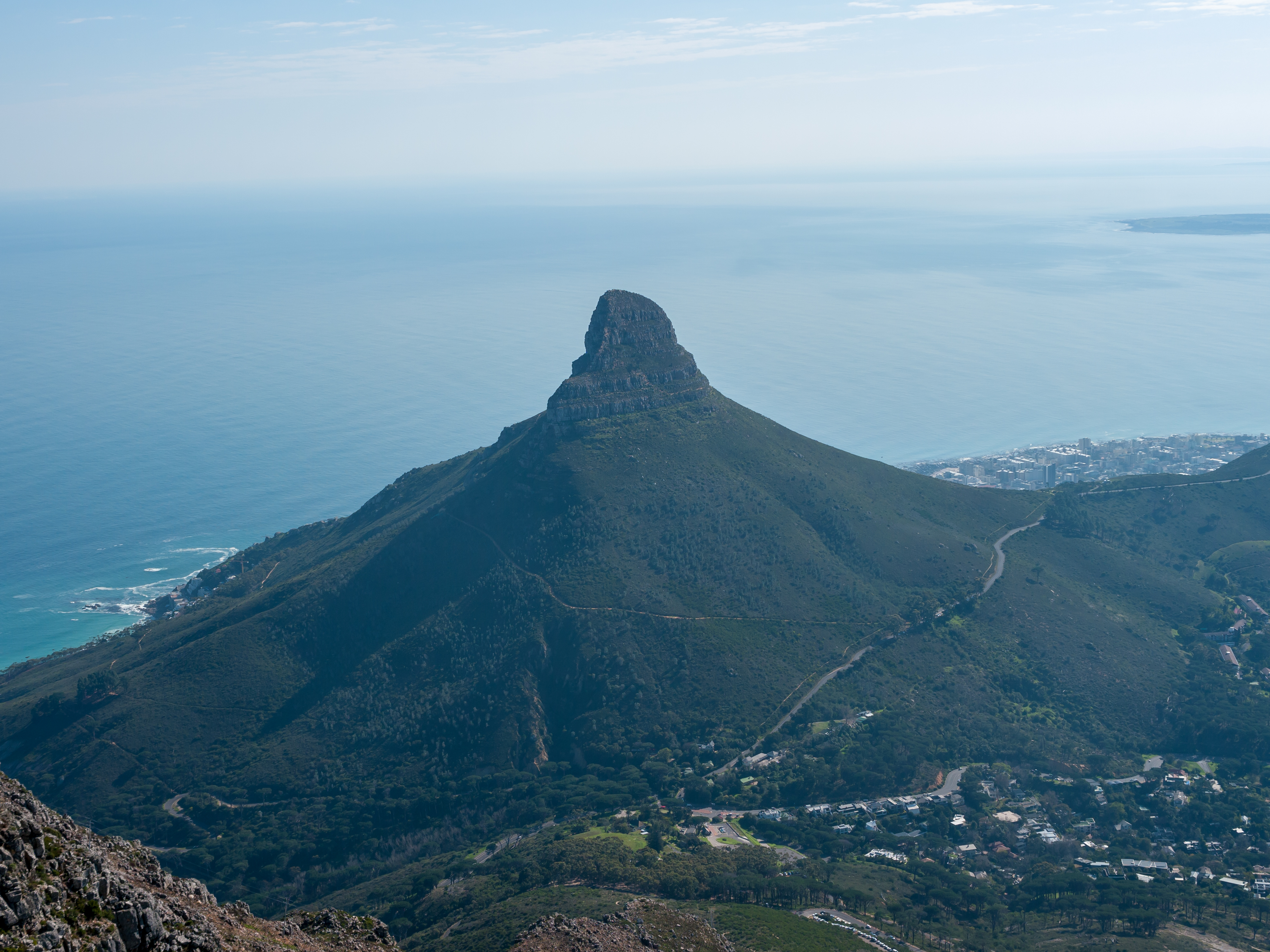
Lion's Head is a popular hiking spot, and offers panoramic views from the top. A shorter hike is also available up Signal Hill, to the right of Lion's Head

== Operations ==
Cape Town Tourism is managed by a board of directors, and is funded directly by the City of Cape Town, which collaborates with Responsible Tourism Cape Town.

As Cape Town's official Destination Marketing Organization, Cape Town Tourism operates an Information Center line for queries about the city. The organization also runs Visitor Experience Centers at Cape Town International Airport (CTIA) and Kirstenbosch Botanical Gardens.

Cape Town Tourism also operates a website dedicated to promoting Cape Town, and its many. The website features an Official Guide to Cape Town, maps, weather information, visa information for South Africa, information about attractions and potential areas to stay in Cape Town, tour info, and a listing service for members.

The Cape Town Travel website also facilitates media visits to the city, and interested parties can submit travel enquiries that Cape Town Tourism will respond to with recommendations.

The agency also publishes a Travel Trade Directory, which serves as a quick reference guide to experiences for strategic partners, such as travel agents.

Cape Town Tourism also collaborates with Wesgro – the tourism, trade, and investment promotion agency for the Western Cape province.

The agency participates in numerous international marketing exhibitions and roadshows in key tourism source markets.

Tourism in South Africa in general is managed by the Department of Tourism, under the Minister of Tourism. Countrywide tourism marketing falls under the national marketing agency, South African Tourism. Cape Town Tourism, on the other hand, focuses solely on the municipality.

=== Annual Report ===
Cape Town Tourism also publishes an Annual Report pertaining to tourism-related matters in the city. The report tracks information such as airport arrivals, accommodation occupancy rates, visitor numbers for attractions, Cape Town's destination brand valuation, and LTBTQIA+ tourism.

=== Responsible Tourism ===
Cape Town Tourism follows the City of Cape Town's Responsible Tourism (RT) Policy (2009). In line with City policies, Cape Town Tourism's work focuses not just on economic growth, but also on creating positive social, economic, cultural, and environmental interactions in the city. Responsible Tourism focuses on ensuring that tourists leave their destination without having a negative impact on the environment.

Cape Town Tourism operates TravelWise Cape Town, an information platform covering aspects of responsible tourism in Cape Town. Its coverage includes the city's electricity supply, water strategy, and skills development.

== Partners and members ==
Cape Town Tourism works closely with numerous partner organizations, including some of the city's main tourist sites. Partners include the V&A Waterfront, MSC Cruises, Table Mountain Aerial Cableway, the Robben Island Museum, Southern Sun Hotels, Vodacom, and the Aquila Private Game Reserve.

The agency engages in strategic partnerships in order to promote tourism in the city. One such example is the 2024 partnership with the local Stormers rugby team, whereby a "Love Cape Town" logo was featured on their official kit.

Major members include Airports Company South Africa (ACSA), Cape Point Vineyards, CapeNature, Club Mykonos Resort Langebaan, Hotel Sky, Hotel Verde Cape Town Airport, Inverdoon Game Reserve, Newlands Brewery, The Diamond Works, the Vineyard Hotel, and the Two Oceans Aquarium.

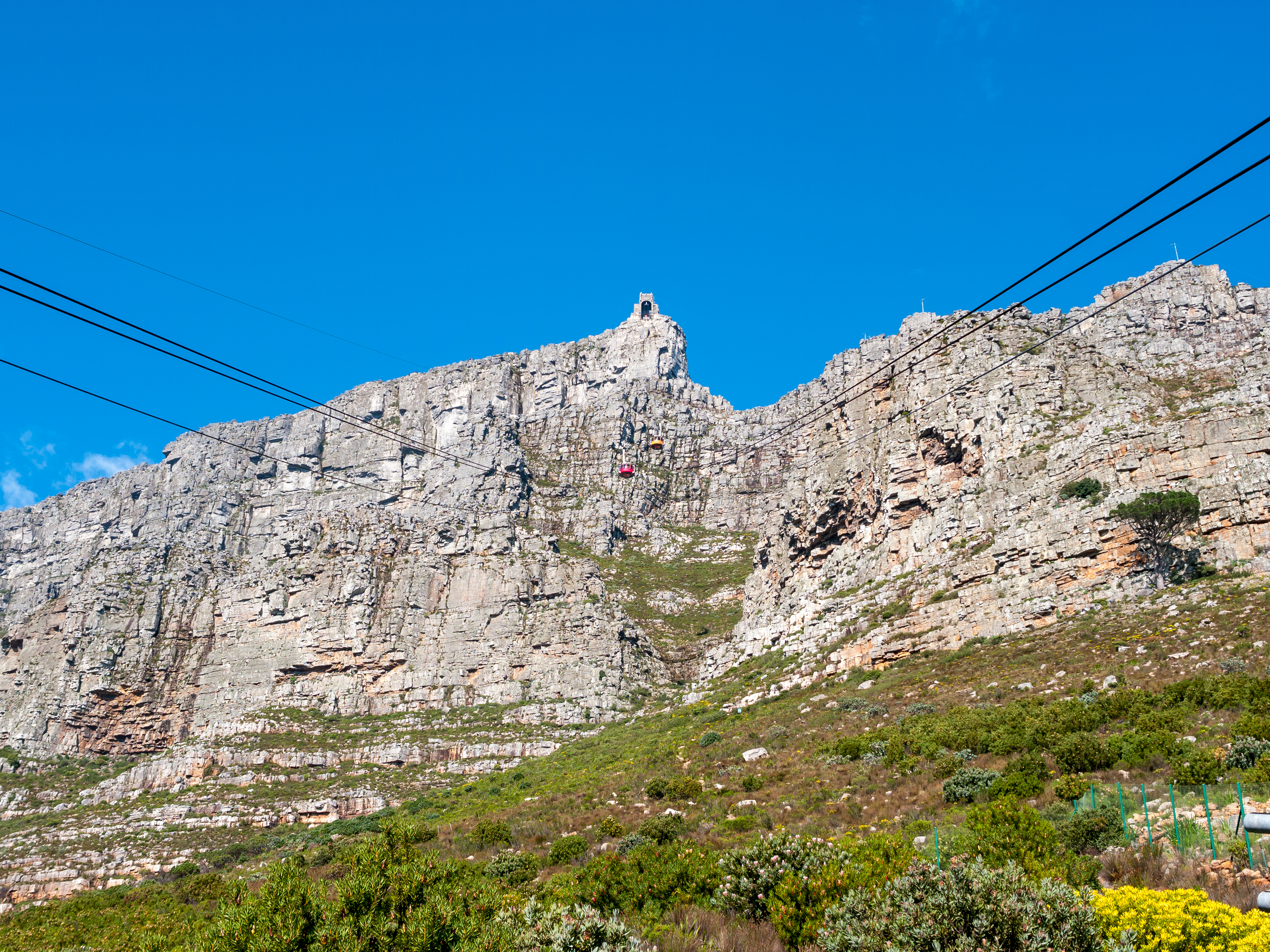
Taking a ride on the Table Mountain Aerial Cableway is a popular attraction for locals and tourists alike

== Cape Town's awards ==
The city of Cape Town has won numerous awards in recent years, which have been promoted by Cape Town Tourism. These include Timeout Index's "11th Best City in the World", Conde Nast's "9th Best City in the World" and "10th Friendliest City in the World", a World Travel Award for "Africa's Leading City Destination", and Brand Finance City Index's "Best City Brand in Africa" award.

In 2025, Cape Town was ranked as the world's best city by Time Out. In the publication's annual Best Cities in the World list, highlights for Cape Town included the city's beauty, happiness, and varied attractions. 2025's result was an increase from Cape Town's second-place rank the year before.

Also in 2025, Cape Town was named as the world's top city for travel by The Telegraph, for the 8th year in a row. In its Travel Awards, The Telegraph noted Cape Town's mountain-meets-sea landscapes, award-winning wine routes, culinary scene, and affordability for travelers.

Cape Town Tourism itself has also been the recipient of numerous awards, including destination industry, marketing campaign, and technical innovation, and communications strategy awards, from the likes of Skift, City/Nation/Place Awards, the Digital Tourism Think Tank, and WTM Africa.

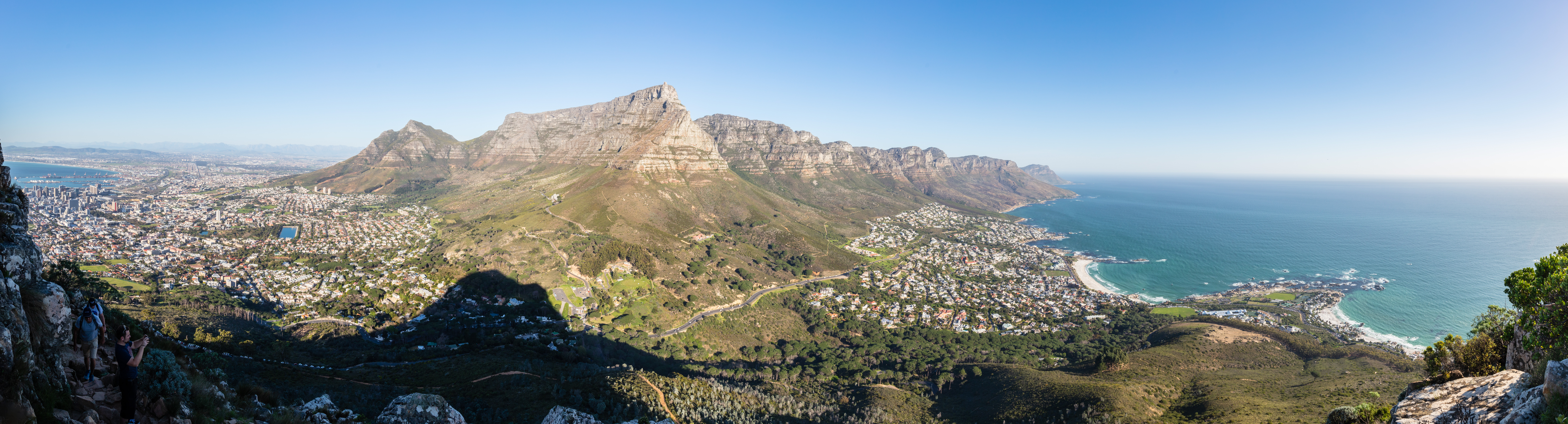
Cape Town offers visitors the opportunity to experience both the Indian and Atlantic Oceans

== See also ==
- Cape Town
- LGBTQIA+ tourism in Cape Town
- City of Cape Town
