= Out In Africa South African Gay and Lesbian Film Festival =

LGBTQ film festival in South Africa

The Out In Africa South African Gay and Lesbian Film Festival was an influential gay and lesbian film festival in South Africa, organised by filmmaker Nodi Murphy and collaborators from 1994 to 2018. Along with holding annual film festivals with events in Johannesburg and Cape Town, Out in Africa (OIA) partnered with groups in rural areas to run smaller festivals that brought together LGBTI community members. Scholar Ricardo Peach said the festival was "instrumental in developing and maintaining a post-Apartheid Queer public sphere which fostered further legal change." Funding included grants from the Atlantic Philanthropies, commercial sponsorships, and contributions from individuals.

== History ==
The festival launched in 1994 to celebrate the inclusion, in the new interim Constitution of South Africa, of a clause prohibiting discrimination on the grounds of sexual orientation. Part of its goal was to advocate for keeping this clause in the finalised Constitution of South Africa (1996). The festival was cofounded by filmmakers Nodi Murphy and Jack Lewis, along with Theresa Raizenberg, Midi Achmat and other activists from the Association of Bisexuals, Gays and Lesbians (ABIGALE). The festival came together after private fundraising film screenings organised by Lewis and members of ABIGALE in 1992 and 1993. It was the first major public LGBTI film festival in the country.

The festival set out to address the lack of visibility of lesbian, gay, bisexual, transgender, and intersex individuals (LGBTIs) in South African social and cultural life after decades of apartheid repression, to counter negative images of LGBTIs that prevail in traditional and religious communities, and to serve as a platform for discussion and debate about the situation of LGBTIs in a newly founded democracy. It promoted development of films by South African filmmakers that reflected the lives and experiences of LGBTI South Africans. Audiences included local residents and tourists (see LGBTQIA+ tourism in Cape Town).

The 1994 festival was covered in the documentary Out in South Africa (1994) by Barbara Hammer.

The 2007 festival opened with a speech by Dikgang Moseneke, Deputy Chief Justice of South Africa, who drew connections between LGBTI rights and "a much broader notion of freedom, of equality, of equal dignity."

The last festival took place in 2018 at Stellenbosch University. Murphy said:

"I think we did our jobs. People in the LGBTIQ community now realise they have rights protecting them and I think issues surrounding sexuality are not as bad as they once were although they do definitely exist. It was great to create spaces within the cinema where people could get together and to realise that as a queer people they were not alone."

== Events ==
The main festival was held in Johannesburg and Cape Town, with smaller "satellite" film festivals in other towns as part of an outreach programme. At its largest, the main festival was an annual event that ran for around 20 days. For example, in 2003 it screened 50 films, including 13 South African productions. It later shifted to three smaller film festival events spread throughout the year. Towards its final years, the festival was smaller, such as a mini-festival with four screenings in 2014, due to funding constraints and an audience that had shifted to watching films from home instead of in theaters.

The festival screened local and international films and shorts, ranging in genre from drama and comedy to documentaries. Many of the films shown have won multiple international awards. Some film screenings were followed by question and answer sessions or panel discussions.

=== Satellite festivals ===
Between 2004 and 2014, Out in Africa organised screenings of LGBTI films in 18 towns in rural areas of South Africa, working with local LGBTI people and groups. These smaller festivals, which included both film screenings and social events such as braais, aimed to foster local gay and lesbian communities and acceptance in areas that had not previously had similar events.

== Workshops and productions ==
Out in Africa organised a series of filmmaking workshops that produced 22 short films. The workshops aimed to counter a lack of locally made films that reflected the lives of Black South African LGBTI people, especially Black lesbians. The festival organisers had sometimes struggled to find sufficient films for the festival that were made by South African filmmakers or featured Black South African people.

Out in Africa released a feature film, While You Weren’t Looking (2015), with funding from the South African National Lottery and Department of Trade, Industry and Competition. It was produced by Murphy, who ran the festivals.

== Funding ==
Festival funding included sponsorships from corporations and local businesses, grants from the Atlantic Philanthropies and other foundations, in-kind donations of films from the British Council and filmmakers, and individual donations. Getting enough funding and collaborators to continue holding the festival from year to year was challenging. The organisers offered marketing placements for brands and encouraged fans to set up recurring donations.

Grants from the Atlantic Philanthropies supported operations for several years but wound down in 2012 as part of the foundation's spend-down process.

== See also ==
- LGBTQ rights in South Africa
- List of LGBT events
