= South African Tourism =

South African national government agency

Agency overview
- Jurisdiction: Government of South Africa
- Headquarters: Bojanala House, Sandton, Gauteng, South Africa
- Annual budget: R1,417,622
- Minister responsible: Patricia de Lille, Minister of Tourism
- Website: southafrica.net

South African Tourism (SA Tourism) is a national government agency in South Africa that serves as the official national tourism marketing agency for the country, with the goal of promoting tourism in South Africa both locally and globally.

== Background ==
SA Tourism hosts the annual Tourism Indaba, held in Durban. It is one of the top three tourism marketing events on the global calendar, and the largest in Africa, attracting thousands of tourism professionals, buyers, and media representatives from around the world.

The organization has an office in Victoria, London, UK, which is responsible for marketing South Africa's leisure and tourist destinations to the UK and Ireland. The organisation's objectives are to develop and implement marketing strategies that promote South Africa around the globe.

== Mandate ==
SA Tourism deals with the tourism sector as it pertains to South Africa in general. Certain provinces and cities in the country may have their own official bodies that serve the same function, advocating for their respective local tourism markets. Examples are Wesgro in the Western Cape, and Cape Town Tourism in Cape Town, which are funded and overseen by provincial and municipal governments respectively.

== Governance ==
The minister of tourism appoints the chief executive officer, who is then submitted to the Cabinet of South Africa for approval The chief executive officer is responsible for steering the mandate and all operations of the government's official Destination Marketing Organisation’s head office and its national offices.

Additionally, the SA Tourism Board of Directors is appointed by the Minister of Tourism. The management team of SA Tourism is known as the executive committee (EXCO). It consists of the chief executive officer (CEO), chief operating officer (COO), chief financial officer (CFO), chief marketing officer, chief quality assurance officer (CQAO) and the newly added position of the chief strategy officer (CSO).

The chief quality assurance officer at SA Tourism is responsible for the Tourism Grading Council of South Africa, established in the early 2000s which issues stars to hospitality establishments from 1 to 5 as an indicator of quality.

In 2019, Mmamoloko Kubayi-Ngubane was appointed minister of tourism, succeeding Derek Hanekom. In 2023, the position was taken up by Patricia de Lille.

== The Lilizela Tourism Awards ==
The Lilizela Tourism Awards, an annual awards' ceremony held in recognition of the top South African leisure and holiday service providers are hosted by SA Tourism consisting of a panel of 28 judges who are tourism industry experts. The awards are an initiative of the South African National Department of Tourism and are spearheaded by SA Tourism annually since 2012 and in 2017 the awards attracted a record number of 1 649 entries.

The Lilizela Awards are the largest and only countrywide celebration of tourism excellence in South Africa. Entry to the Lilizela Tourism Awards is free and all tourism businesses are encouraged to enter in so to develop, grow and help bring about positive change to the tourism sector in South Africa.

However, accommodation establishments need to obtain a star grading from the Tourism Grading Council of South Africa (TGCSA) before entering the awards' competition as the TGCSA is the only recognised and globally benchmarked quality assurance body for tourism products in South Africa.

Previous winners of the Lilizela Tourism Awards include, Birds of Eden, the world's largest free flight aviary and bird sanctuary, located near Plettenberg Bay in the Western Cape, South Africa. In 2012, the Monkeyland Primate Sanctuary was awarded the Lilizela Tourism Visitor Experience of the Year Award at a 'Wildlife Encounters'. Notable recipients of the award include, Esther Mahlangu who received the 2015 Lilizela Tourism Award for Roots and culture, South Africa.

== SA Tourism success ==
According to Statistics South Africa, in 2017, one in every 22 employed people in South Africa were working in the tourism sector, totalling 722 013 individuals accounting for 4,5% of the 16,2 million people in South Africa's workforce. Furthermore, President Cyril Ramaphosa in his 2017 State of the Nation Address (South Africa) stated that tourism provided South Africa great opportunities and was performing better than the other industries.

== Challenges faced by South African Tourism ==
Chinese tourists are considered to be a lucrative market, but SA Tourism has struggled to attract them due to the high crime rate and complicated visa policy of South Africa. South African authorities require an unabridged birth certificate for the child and a letter of consent from both parents which has discouraged some international visitors and negatively impacted tour operator business in South Africa.

Additionally, airlines that allow ineligible passengers to fly into South Africa, incur severe penalties where they are compelled to pay for the return fare of the passengers.

The Institute for Security Studies, said it was becoming increasingly difficult to market the country as more and more people emigrate to countries like Australia and New Zealand due to the crime rate in addition to numerous tourists being attacked in Cape Town on Table Mountain and Johannesburg.

In September 2018, The Tourism Business Council of South Africa (TBCSA) council called for the government to regulate Airbnb rental sites as they pose a threat to the viability of conventional lodging providers such as hotels. This sentiment was also echored by the CEO of SA Tourism Sisa Ntshona who pointed out Airbnb, Uber, and Lyft as the new face of the sharing economy but suggested for fairness between these new players and conventional service providers.

== In the media ==
SA Tourism as a Destination marketing organization has emphasised the need for South Africa to be viewed as a "value-for money destination" instead of a "cheap destination".

== In academia ==
SA Tourism has been portrayed in a Doctor of Philosophy Thesis by Dr Tinashe Chuchu titled, Destination marketing: a study into international airport service experience, destination image and intention to revisit South Africa published by the University of the Witwatersrand.

In 2001, Academics, Prof Leyland Pitt, Michael Ewing, Julie Napoli based at Curtin University of Technology collaborated with Pierre Berthon from University of Bath and Clive Wynne from the University of Cape Town to study the impact of the internet on the South African Tourism industry.

== Controversies ==
=== Tottenham Hotspur FC sponsorship ===
In January 2023, the Daily Maverick reported that the entity was considering a three-year sponsorship deal with the Tottenham Hotspur F.C. worth just under a R1 billion ($58 million). A public outcry against this deal.

The board has agreed, 30 March 2023, not to proceed with the Tottenham Hotspur FC sponsorship proposal as advised by Tourism Minister Patricia de Lille. De Lille received a letter from the SA Tourism Board Chairperson stating that they are no longer considering the proposed sponsorship deal.

On 19 April 2023, Tourism Minister Patricia de Lille announced her intention to dissolve the board of SA Tourism by the end of the week. The acting CEO, Themba Khumalo resigned from SA Tourism on 6 May 2023.

== See also ==
- Cape Town Tourism
- Wesgro
