= LGBTQ tourism in Cape Town =

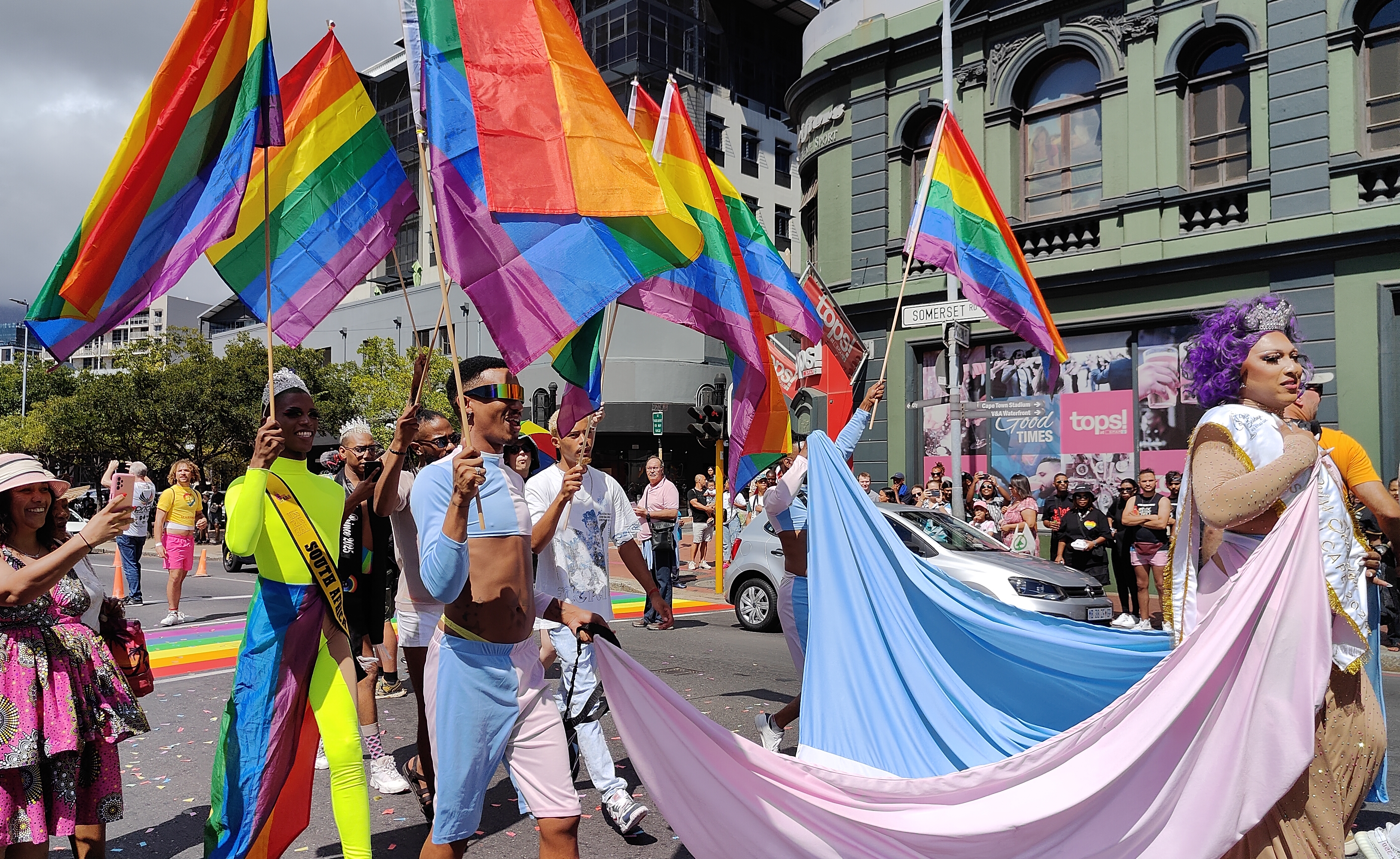
The Cape Town Pride march, on its route along Somerset Road, in the gayborhood of De Waterkant, Cape Town, in 2025

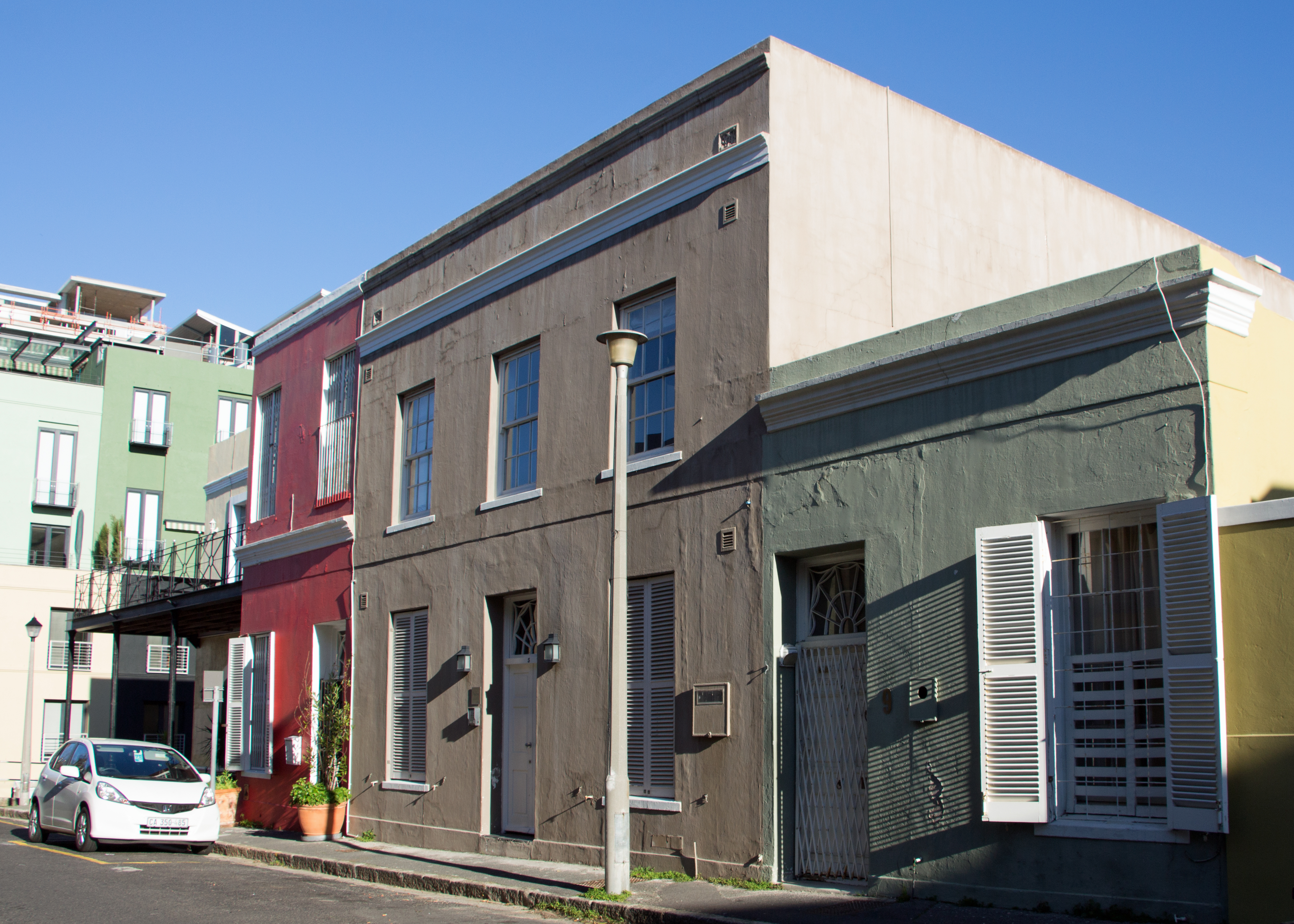
Gay-friendly holiday accommodation in De Waterkant, Cape Town

As of February 2026, South Africa remains the only country on the African continent to have legalized same-sex marriage, having done so in 2006

LGBTQIA+ tourism in Cape Town is a form of tourism catering to members of the LGBTQIA+ community who visit Cape Town, one of the capitals of South Africa.

Cape Town is the most popular destination for LGBT tourists in South Africa, and the city is regarded as the Gay Capital of Africa.

Cape Town hosts the annual Cape Town Pride festival in February and March, the Mother City Queer Project in December, and the Out in Africa Film Festival in September and October every year.

As of 2025, Cape Town is considered one of the world's friendliest cities towards the LGBTQ+ community. Cape Town was named the Best LGBTQ+ City Destination in the 2026 SPARTACUS Travel Awards.

== Cape Town; The Gay Capital of Africa ==
Cape Town's popularity as an LGBT tourism destination, welcoming visitors from all around the world, is due in large part to its strong post-apartheid culture of tolerance; its numerous LGBTQIA+-centric establishments; as well as its natural beauty and relaxed lifestyle, comprising white, sandy beaches, mountains, wine farms, forest trails, white, sandy beaches, and a mild, Mediterranean climate.

Same-sex marriage has been legal in South Africa since 2006, making the country the world's 5th (and Africa's 1st) to legalize same-sex marriage.

The progressive, post-1994, Constitution of South Africa, with its strong social democratic roots, enshrines the rights of individuals regardless of race, sex, religion, sexual orientation (being the first country in the world to outlaw discrimination based on sexual orientation), or gender identity, and Capetonians have been traditionally very welcoming to members of the LGBTQIA+ community.

=== De Waterkant ===
De Waterkant, sometimes affectionately referred to as the Pink District, is Cape Town's gay village (gayborhood). It is a mixed-use, residential and commercial suburb next to Cape Town CBD, in the City Bowl region.

The suburb has a high concentration of guest houses, hotels, pubs, clubs, spas, museums, and other establishments of interest to the LGBTQIA+ community.

De Waterkant is home to the starting point of the Cape Town Pride festival, which takes place in late February or early March each year. The march starts at the city's permanent rainbow crosswalk, on Somerset Road. De Waterkant also hosts numerous Cape Town Pride-related festivities during the city's Pride Week.

The Pink Route is a commemorative painted line through De Waterkant, that takes visitors on a tour of establishments relating to the LGBT+ community. The route serves to educate visitors about the community, and celebrate its inclusive atmosphere.

It was installed in 2022, along with the rainbow crosswalk, and features a 20 cm painted pink line on sidewalks in Somerset Road, Liddle Street, Dixon Street, Waterkant Street, and Rose Street, up to Strand Street.

Other attractions for tourists include the city's numerous Blue Flag beaches, wine farms, and abundance of good restaurants.

=== ILGA's 2024 World Conference ===
Cape Town hosted the ILGA World Conference in November 2024, marking the first time in 25 years that the Conference returned to be hosted on the African continent.

The ILGA World Conference is a global gathering of LGBTQIA+ advocates and those working for the advancement of rights for, and improvements within, the community.

According to ILGA, the ILGA World Conference is a chance to assess where the communities they support and advocate for stand, share experiences and best practices, build alliances and partnerships, discuss the future of their movement, and collectively chart ways to advance equality worldwide.

As the premier gathering for their member organizations and allies, the ILGA World Conference is also where the life of the organization is shaped. ILGA members elect their representatives, advance proposals and constitutional changes, and endorse new organizations to join ILGA.

Through research, advocacy, and empowerment, ILGA supports and campaigns for LGBTQIA+ rights, and has been doing so since 1978. ILGA World is a global federation comprising 1919 member organizations, from 169 countries.

=== Cape Town's Bid to Host the 2030 Gay Games ===
Cape Town submitted a bid to host the 2030 Gay Games.

The Games typically attract over 10,000 participants, of all skill levels, competing in more than 30 different sports, over a 10 day period. Athletes across the spectrum of sexual orientation and gender identity are welcome to participate in the Games, making it one of the most inclusive sporting events worldwide. In addition to sports, the Gay Games include a cultural program, featuring theatre, choral, and music performances, remembrance ceremonies, and art exhibitions.

Cape Town's Mayor, Geordin Hill-Lewis, expressed his support for the bid, saying, “South Africa is a beacon of diversity and inclusion with one of the most progressive constitutions upholding human rights. In Cape Town, you can live authentically, protected against discrimination based on beliefs, gender identity, or sexual orientation.” He encouraged support for Cape Town’s bid to bring the games to Africa.

David Ryan, Co-Chair of the Games' Cape Town 2030 Bid Committee stated that Cape Town is perfectly placed to host the Gay Games in 2030. Ryan stated, "While the Mother City is world-renowned among the global LGBTQIA+ community as the Gay Capital of Africa, we also see this bid to host the Gay Games as a platform to start conversations and reshape the narrative around what it means to be queer in Africa. We want to do more than just host a 10-day event with a 10-day impact; the Gay Games will be just the start of our mission to promote acceptance and leave a legacy of lasting change in Cape Town, South Africa and Africa".

25 cities across 5 continents expressed an interest in bidding to host the 13th Gay Games event, taking place in 2030. Of those cities, 10 moved on to the next stage of the bidding process, by submitting an official letter of intent to bid and payment of the first bid fee. Each of those cities participated in a number of meetings over the next few months in anticipation of this deadline, including informational sessions, Q&A sessions, and individual meetings.

As part of the process, the aforementioned cities were expected to submit a first version of their “bid book” - a document which describes how they aim to host the Gay Games in their city - by August 2024. This document will validate that they understand and have control over the whole process of the organization and delivery of the 10-day event.

7 cities were then invited to present their bid at the FGG Annual General Assembly in Washington, D.C. in October 2024. That event afforded bid organizations the opportunity to speak directly with FGG Delegates, Honorary Life Members, and Volunteers; much of that delegation comprised qualified voting members, tasked with selecting 3 finalists cities in December 2024.

While Cape Town did not go through to the final three cities to host the games, its bid received a standing ovation. The final decision of which city will host the Games is expected to be announced in late 2025.

=== WorldPride 2028 in Cape Town ===
Cape Town bid for, and was chosen as the host city for WorldPride 2028.

WorldPride is an annual series of international LGBTQIA+ Pride events coordinated by InterPride. WorldPride features a Human Rights Conference, an arts and culture program, social events, as well as a march to highlight LGBTQIA+ realities across the world. It gathers Pride organizers, local and international speakers, artists, activists, politicians, and other participants across all walks of life, to take part in the events.

Cape Town, with its long-standing support for the LGBTQIA+ community, and advocacy of the advancement of the community's rights, will host WorldPride's 11th Edition, in 2028, and will be the first city on the African continent to do so. InterPride promotes increased visibility and awareness of LGBTQIA+ issues globally, advocates for the advancement of gay the community's rights worldwide, and hosts, among other things, a Human Rights Conference.

Members of InterPride voted to determine the host of WorldPride 2028, following their 42nd Annual General Meeting and World Conference, held from 23 to 27 October 2024 in Medellín, Colombia.

Cape Town Pride CEO Tommy Patterson said, “We are thrilled at the news and for this support shown by our world LGBTI+ family. The team did a wonderful job, and we all forged great friendships and allies from Pride groups from all over the globe”.

Cllr Roberto Quintas, who represented the City of Cape Town, said; “It was an incredible privilege to be a part of the World Pride Cape Town 2028 Bid Team in Medellin, Colombia, in October. This means a lot for the many LGBTQIA+ people without a voice, and who live in fear of persecution, prosecution and worse in the region and on the continent. We are thrilled to announce that we “brought it home” and that our Mother City, on the southernmost tip of Africa, will be hosting this global event in four years’ time.”

== See also ==
- LGBT events in South Africa
- Same-sex marriage in South Africa
- LGBT rights in South Africa
- LGBT cruises
