= De Waterkant =

Suburb of Cape Town, South Africa

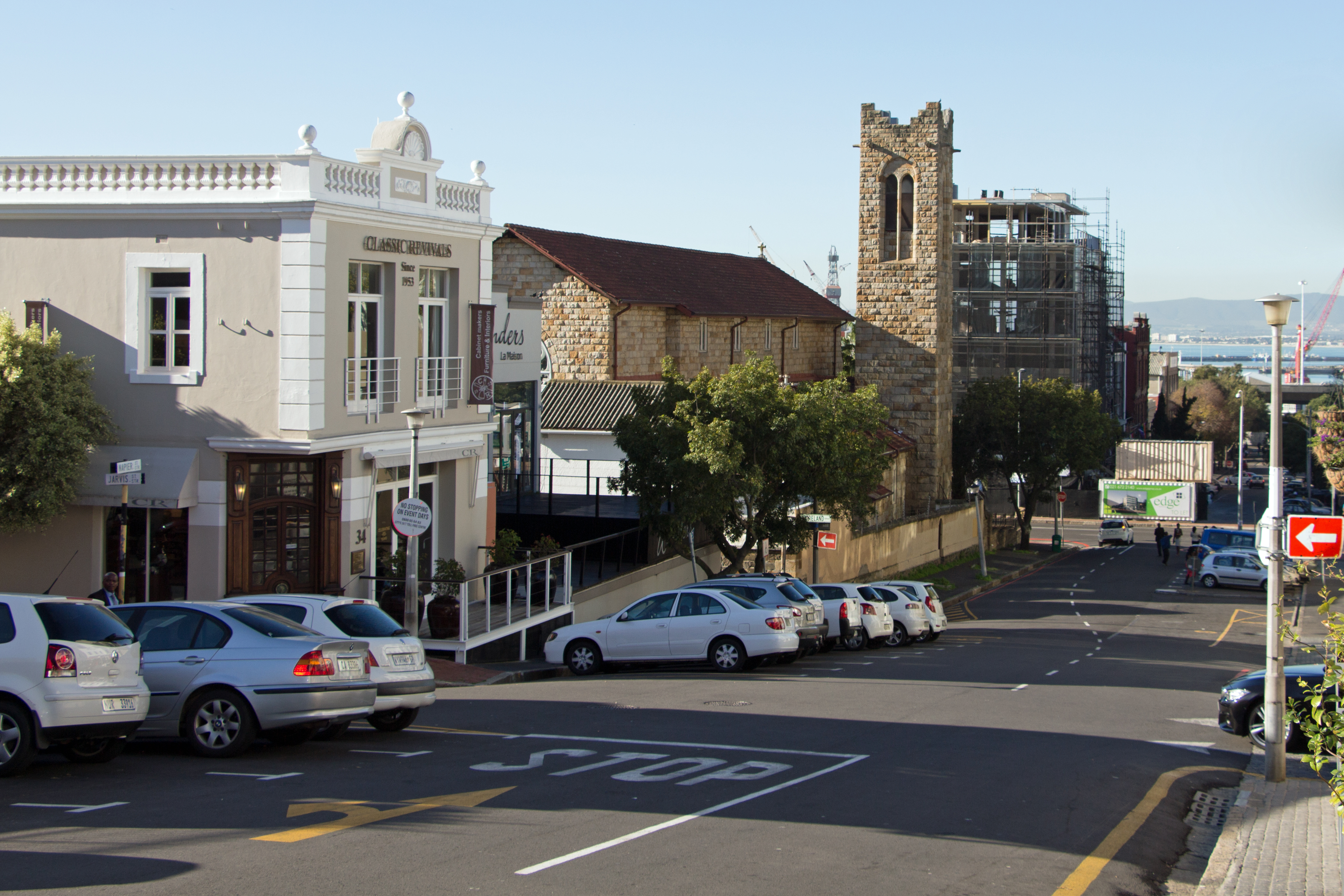
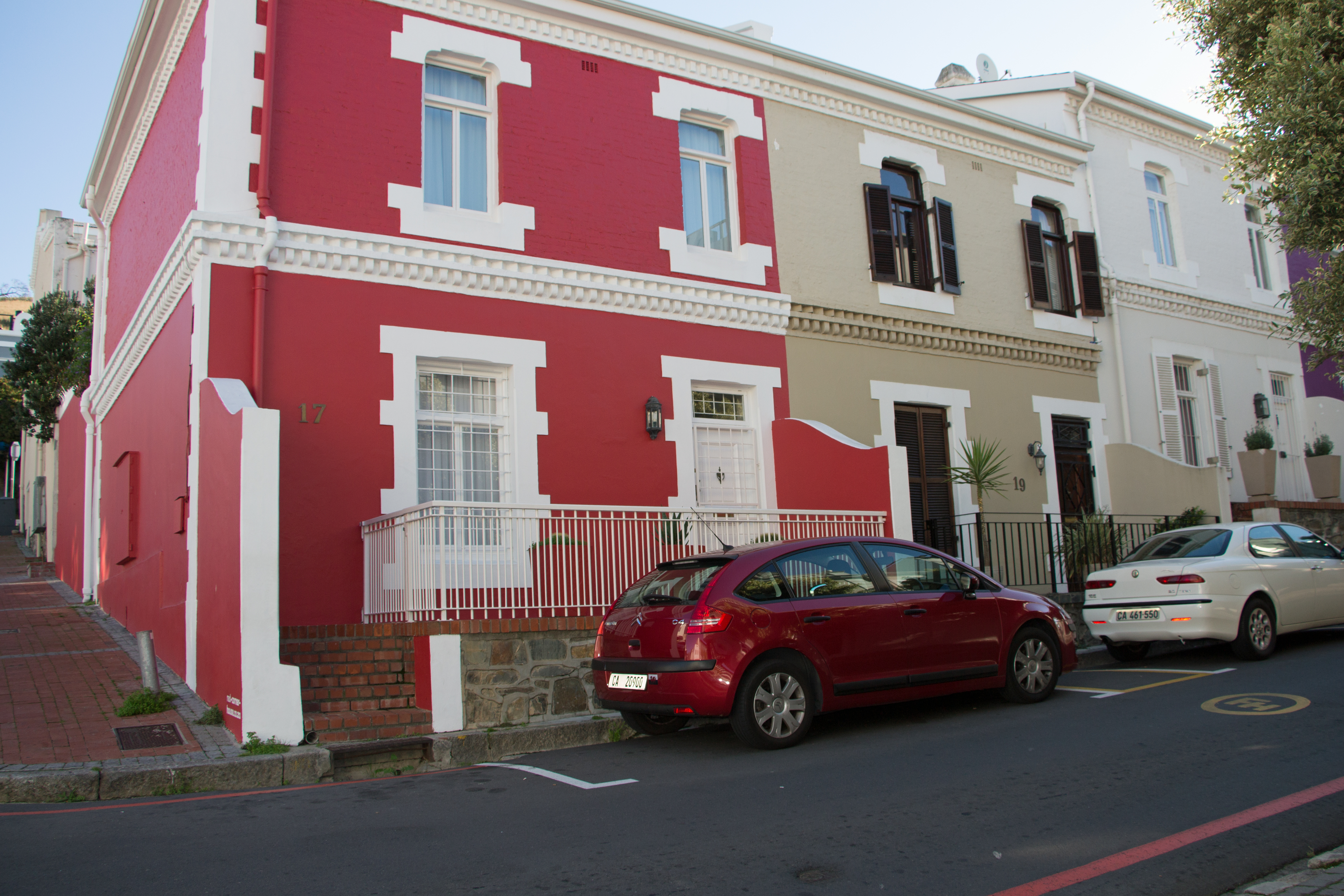
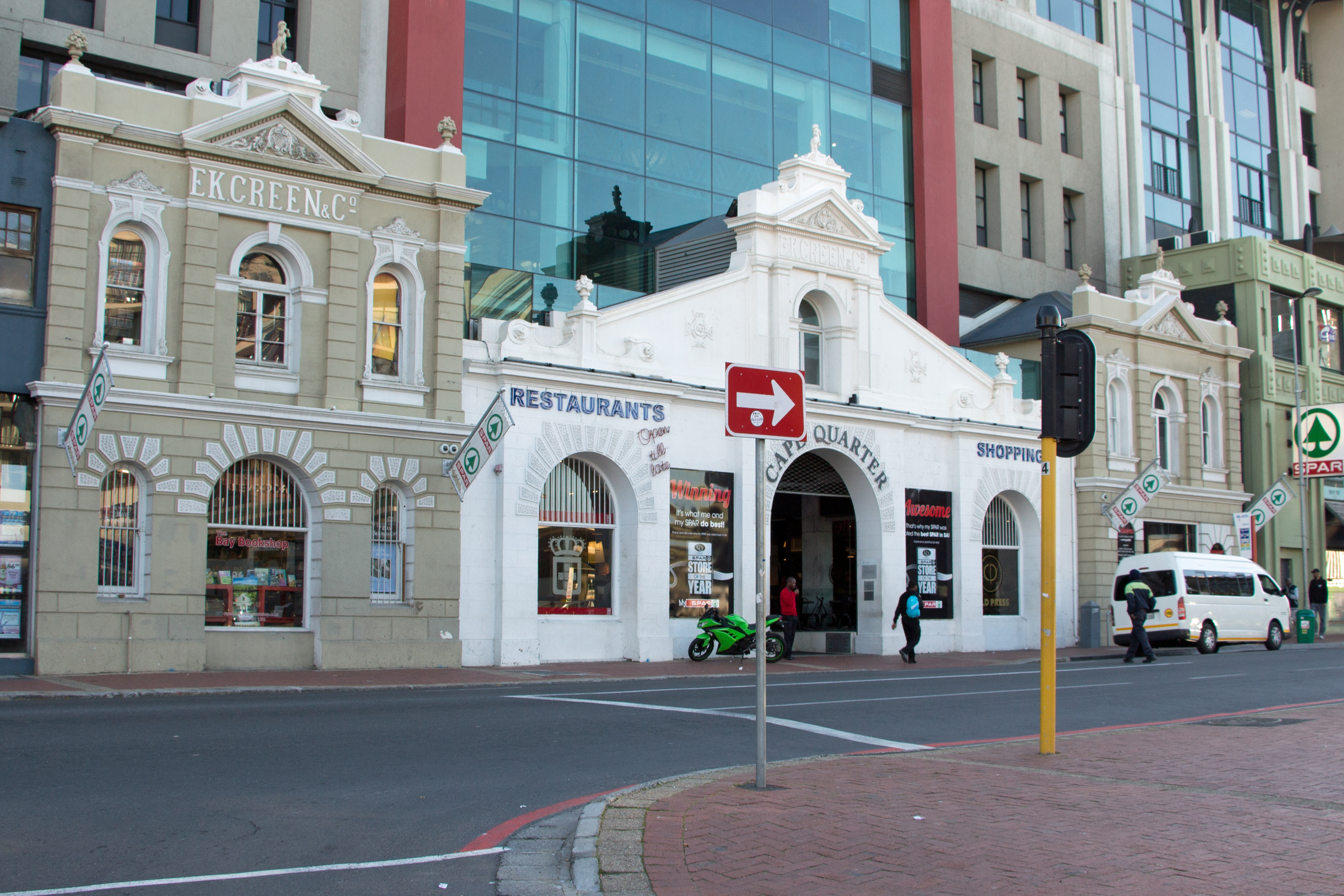
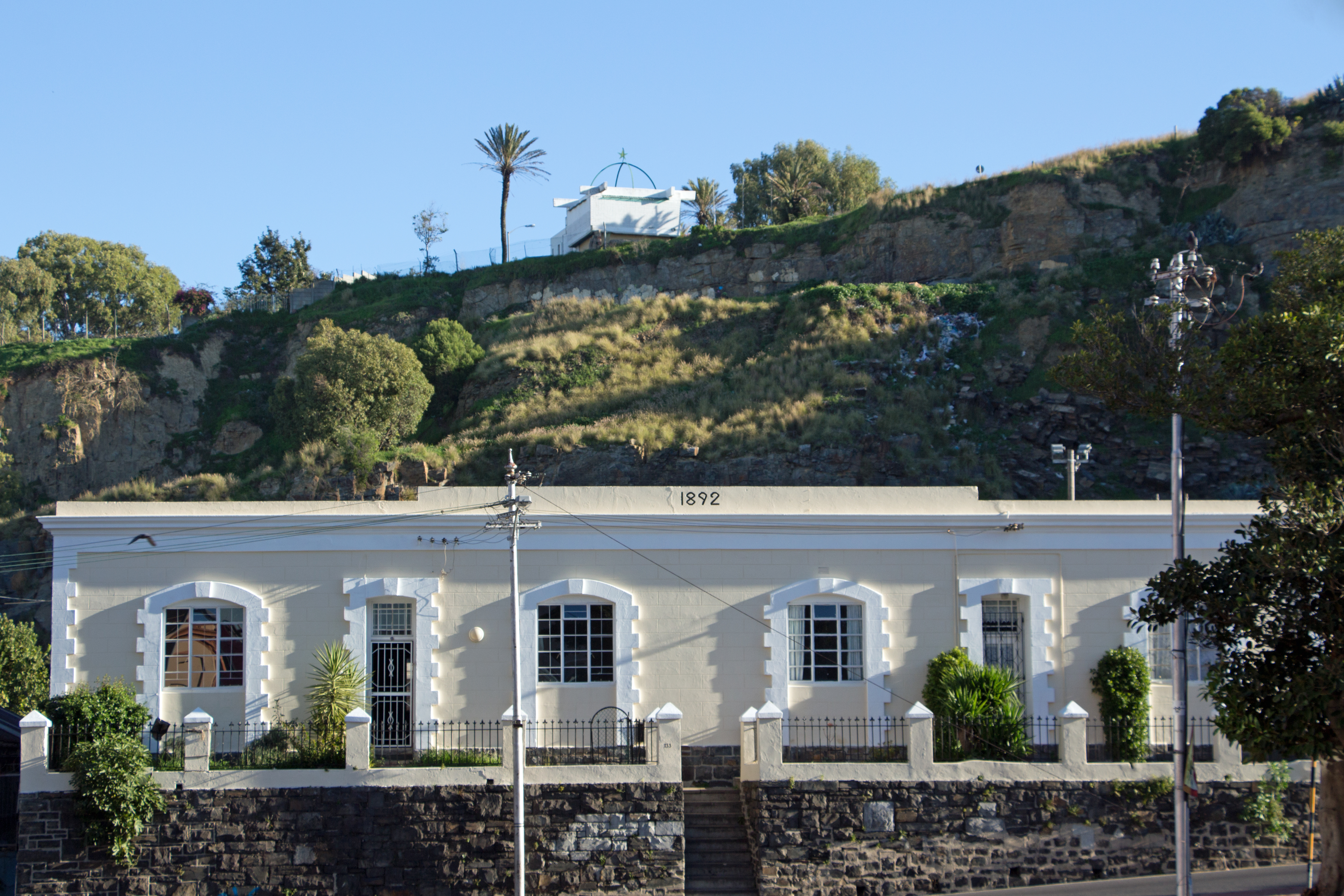
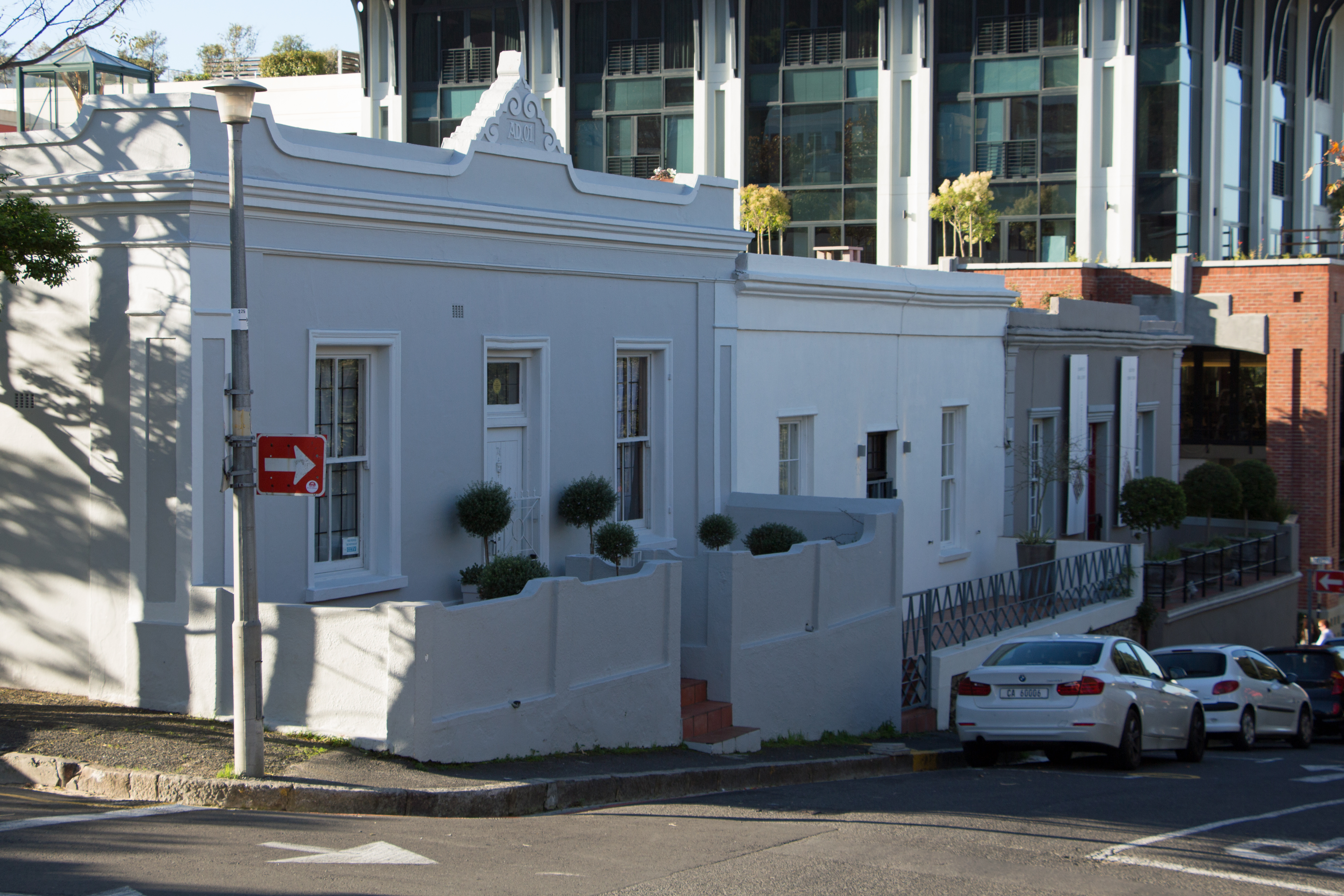
- Clockwise from top: Street in De Waterkant, Cape Quarter Mall, An old house in De Waterkant, Bo-Kaap seen from De Waterkant, Old traditional homes of De Waterkant.
- Interactive map of De Waterkant
- Location within Western Cape Location within South Africa
- Coordinates: 33°54′55″S 18°25′08″E
- Country: South Africa
- Province: Western Cape
- Municipality: City of Cape Town

Area
  - Total: 0.30 km^{2} (0.12 sq mi)

Population (2011)
  - Total: 361
  - Density: 1,200/km^{2} (3,100/sq mi)

Racial makeup (2011)
  - Black African: 11.6%
  - Coloured: 5.0%
  - Indian/Asian: 5.5%
  - White: 75.3%
  - Other: 2.5%

First languages (2011)
  - English: 69.8%
  - Afrikaans: 17.2%
  - Sotho: 1.4%
  - Other: 11.6%
- Time zone: UTC+2 (SAST)
- Postal code (street): 8001
- Area code: 021

De Waterkant is a historic suburb of Cape Town, South Africa, and is well-known for being the city's gay village.

The neighborhood is located in the City Bowl region of Cape Town, adjacent to the central business district (CBD), on the southeastern end of Somerset Road. To the south, it is neighbored by the historically Cape Malay neighborhood of Bo-Kaap.

It contains many vibrantly-colored buildings, lining its sometimes still cobbled streets. creating a very distinct and enjoyable atmosphere.

De Waterkant is popular among young professionals and tourists, and contains numerous niche restaurants and retailers. The area is also home to the Cape Quarter shopping mall and tertiary education institution Vega's Cape Town campus.

== Cape Town's Gayborhood ==
De Waterkant is a gay village, and a neighborhood, destination, and tourist attraction, for members of the LGBTQIA+ community, as well as those interested in supporting the community.

Cape Town is a historically very friendly and welcoming city for members of the community, and is known as the Gay Capital of Africa, being a popular LGBTQIA+ tourist destination.

De Waterkant contains Cape Town's first rainbow crosswalk, installed in 2022 to celebrate the LGBTQIA+ community, as well as the Pink Route, which is a painted, pink line along the pavements of various streets in the area. The route offers a way for visitors to take a guided walk around the area, taking them past numerous community-related establishments.

The annual Cape Town Pride parade starts in De Waterkant, with a ribbon cutting ceremony at the rainbow crossing in Somerset Road, followed by a march to the Green Point Track grounds, for Pride-related festivities.
