= Midi Achmat =

South African LGBT activist

- Born: Taghmeda Achmat
- Education: University of the Western Cape
- Occupation: Activist
- Partner: Theresa Raizenberg
- Relatives: Zackie Achmat (brother)

Taghmeda Achmat, commonly known as Midi Achmat, is one of South Africa's most well known lesbian activists. Achmat co-founded the Treatment Action Campaign (TAC) with her partner and fellow activist Theresa Raizenberg on 10 December 1998.

== Biography ==
Taghmeda "Midi" Achmat came from a family of Cape Malay anti-apartheid activists, and is a member of the Cape Coloured community. Her brother Zackie Achmat is an activist and filmmaker. Achmat met her partner Theresa Raizenberg in 1986, when the two were teenagers. Raizenberg was introduced to Achmat through the latter's aunt, and had already met Achmat's brother Zackie. Achmat and Raizenberg bonded over lesbian novels and both became active in the LGBT community of Cape Town.

Achmat, her brother Zackie, and Raizenberg were part of a group which co-founded the black-led Association of Bisexuals, Gays, and Lesbians (ABIGALE) which organized the Johannesburg Pride March in 1992. Both Midi and Zackie Achmat were ostracized by their family after coming out as gay. In addition to ABIGALE, Achmat co-founded the National Coalition of Lesbian and Gay Equality, and the Gay and Lesbian Film Festival of Cape Town.

Achmat has advocated for the implementation of HIV prevention programs in South Africa, and for improved access to healthcare for HIV positive individuals. She led TAC's civil disobedience program to pressure the South African government into implementing an HIV prevention program. She was arrested in 2003 while protesting at the Caledon Square Police Station. That same year, Achmat, Raizenberg and intersex activist Sally Gross were jointly awarded the Galactic/Allison Masters Community Award for their contributions to the LGBT community.

Achmat has remained active in the South African LGBT community, and has contributed to various academic journals in addition to collaborating with international researchers and activists. She completed her honors thesis at the University of the Western Cape on the difficulties facing Muslim women in the LGBT community, and later founded Unveiling the Hijab, a Facebook group for queer Muslim women, although she personally no longer practices Islam.

In 2007, Achmat's film A Normal Daughter, which followed the life story of a drag queen named Kewpie, was premiered at the Gay & Lesbian Film Festival on Triangle and Stratos Television.
