= Theresa Raizenberg =

South African LGBT activist

Theresa Raizenberg is a South African LGBTQ community equal rights activist. Together with Midi Achmat and Sally Gross, she was awarded the 2003 Galactic/Allison Masters Community Award. She is also one of the founding members of TAC. She has written in various activist journals and is active with the Gay and Lesbian Memory in Action (GALA) organization.
