= Wesgro =

Official tourism agency for the Western Cape

- Formation: 1982; 44 years ago
- Founder: Alan Bramwell; Louis Kreiner
- Type: Schedule 3C public entity
- Headquarters: Cape Town, South Africa
- Region served: Western Cape
- Services: Tourism, trade, and investment promotion Economic research
- Owner: Western Cape Government; City of Cape Town
- Chief executive officer: Wrenelle Stander
- Chairperson: Shirley Zinn
- Budget: ▼ R162.7 million (2026/27)
- Revenue: ▼ R164.2 million (2024/25) (2024/25)
- Expenses: ▼ R171.4 million (2024/25)
- Funding: Government grants and subsidies
- Staff: 118 (2024/25)
- Website: wesgro.co.za

Wesgro is a South African provincial government agency, and the official tourism, trade, and investment promotion agency for the Western Cape province. The organization promotes the province as a tourism and business destination, attracts and facilitates domestic and foreign investment, supports exporters, and provides economic intelligence and market research.

Founded in 1982, and headquartered in Cape Town, Wesgro operates through partnerships with the Western Cape Government, the City of Cape Town, and the private sector.

== History ==
Wesgro originated in 1981 as a public-private initiative involving business associations, private companies, nonprofit organizations, and local government in the Western Cape. The organization was formally registered in 1982, initially focusing on promoting investment and trade in the region.

In 1996, Wesgro was established as a statutory agency under the Western Cape Investment and Trade Promotion Agency Act, with a mandate to promote investment in and trade with the Western Cape. It subsequently operated as the province's investment and trade promotion agency, attracting investment and helping Western Cape businesses develop their export capabilities.

During the 2000s, tourism destination marketing was handled separately by Cape Town Routes Unlimited (CTRU), which was established in 2004 to market Cape Town and the Western Cape as tourism destinations. Wesgro remained focused primarily on investment and trade promotion.

In 2012, the Western Cape Government consolidated the province's tourism, trade, and investment marketing functions under Wesgro. From 1 April, Wesgro assumed the destination marketing functions, staff, and budget of Cape Town Routes Unlimited, as part of the latter organization's winding down. The consolidation was intended to improve coordination and efficiency by bringing tourism, investment, and trade promotion under a single agency.

The legislative changes accompanying the consolidation were completed in 2013. The Western Cape Tourism Act, 2004, which had provided the statutory basis for Cape Town Routes Unlimited, was repealed, while the Wesgro Act was amended to incorporate tourism destination marketing into the agency's mandate.

Following the consolidation, Wesgro expanded its activities beyond tourism, trade, and investment marketing, to include functions such as cruise tourism, aviation access, media promotion, and business events.

== Operations ==
Wesgro promotes tourism, trade, and investment in the Western Cape. It attracts and facilitates domestic and foreign investment, assists Western Cape businesses with export development and access to international market sectors, and markets the province as a tourism destination.

The agency carries out these functions through investment facilitation, trade development, destination marketing, and economic research. Wesgro works with government, businesses, and other stakeholders to attract investment, visitors, major events, and trade opportunities to the province.

== Governance ==
Wesgro is a Schedule 3C public entity under the Western Cape Investment and Trade Promotion Agency Act, 1996, and is governed by a board appointed by the Western Cape Government's executive authority.

== See also ==
- Western Cape
- Cape Town Tourism
