= Cape Town Pride =

Annual LGBT event in Cape Town, South Africa

- Status: Active
- Genre: Pride event
- Locations: De Waterkant, Cape Town
- Years active: 32–33
- Inaugurated: 1993
- Previous event: 2026
- Next event: 2027
- Major events: Pride parade Mardi gras
- Organiser: Cape Town Pride; OUTReach Africa
- Website: https://cptpride.org

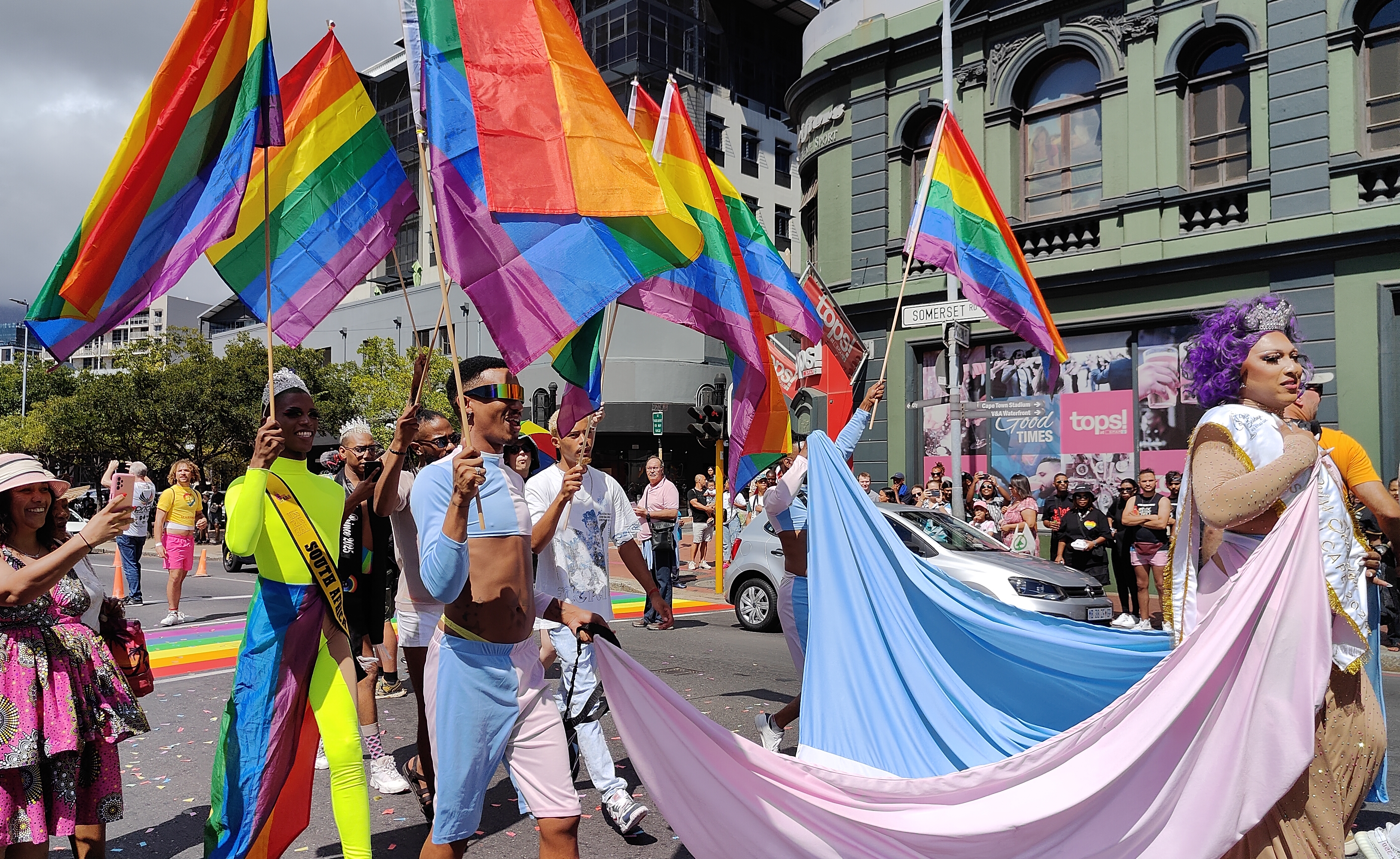
The Cape Town Pride march, on its route along Somerset Road, in the Gayborhood of De Waterkant, Cape Town, in 2025.

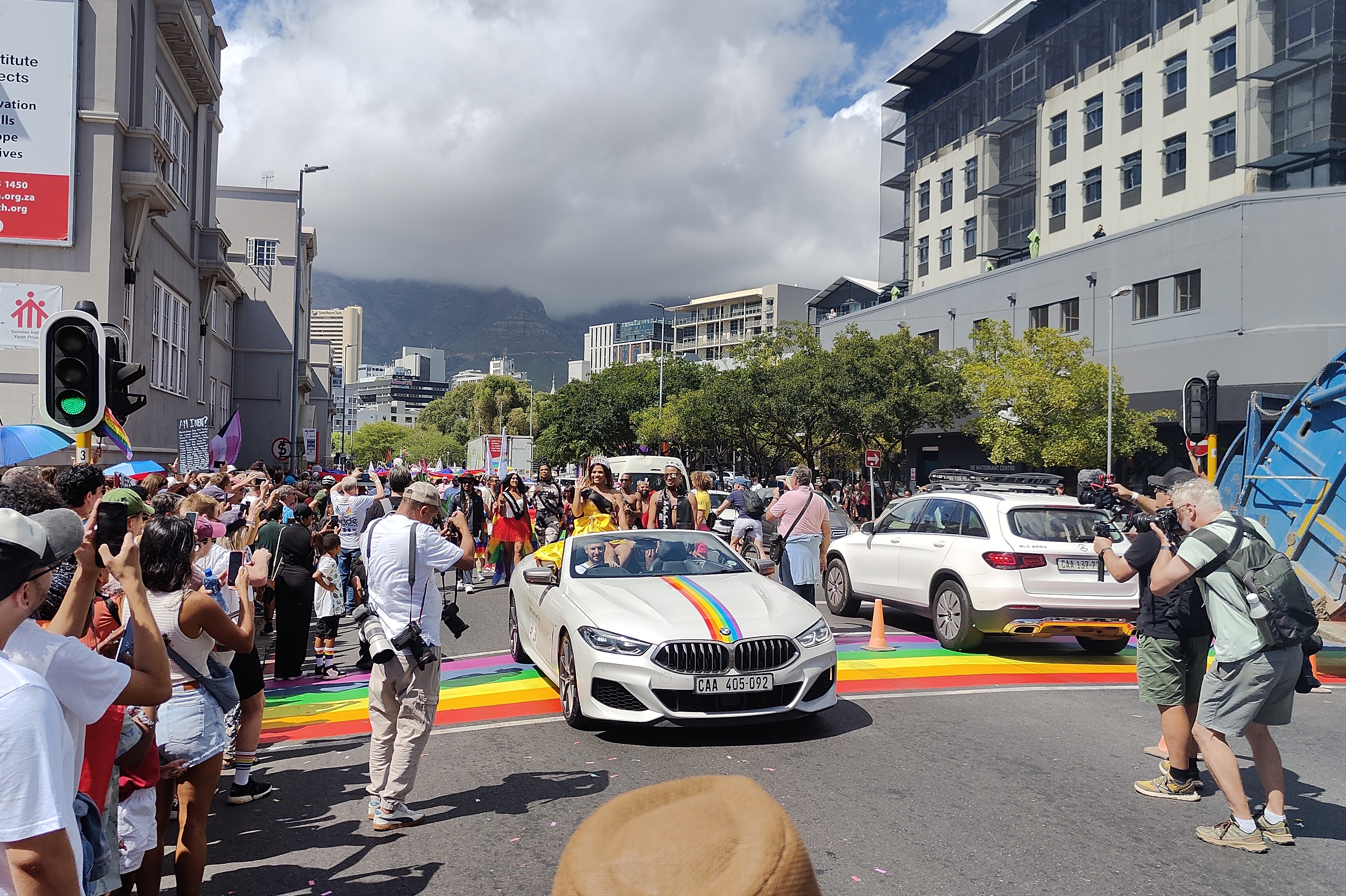
The Rainbow Crosswalk is the official starting point of the Cape Town Pride parade. This photo is from the 2025 parade.

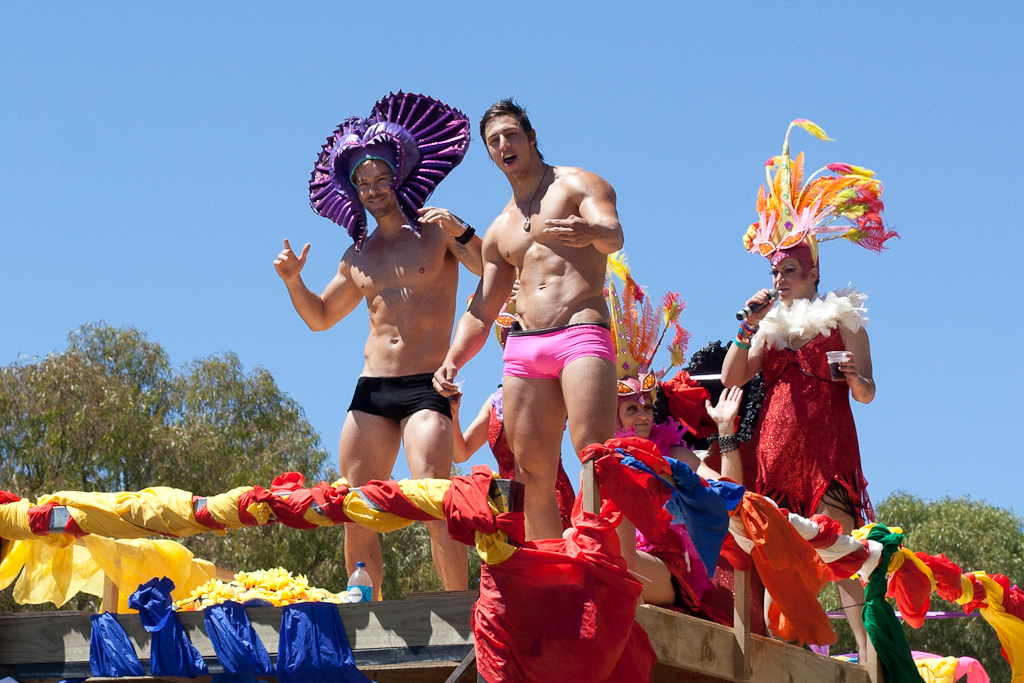
Pride parade attendees on a float at Cape Town Pride 2014.

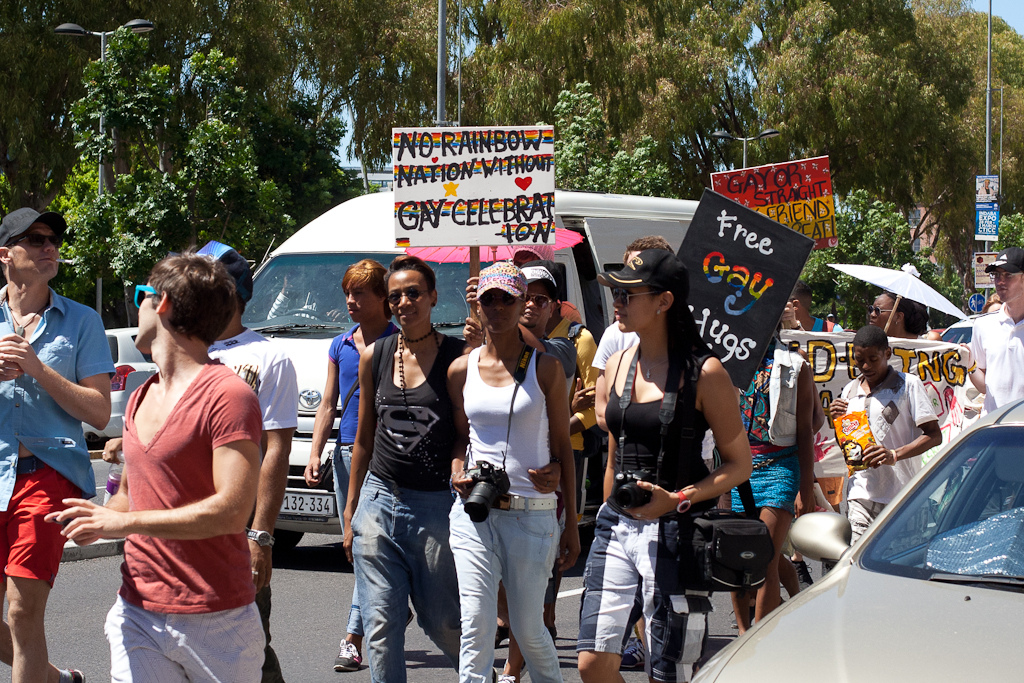
Cape Town Pride 2014 attendees.

Cape Town Pride is an annual gay pride event, featuring a collective of sub-events that includes the Cape Town Pride Parade. It is held in Cape Town, South Africa, and serves as a major opportunity to bring the LGBTQIA+ community together to celebrate their strength, freedom, and diversity.

It usually runs from around the end of February and is a week of festivals, parties and other events.

== History ==
The first pride parade in Cape Town was held in 1993, and has been held as an annual event since.

The parade resumed after a period in 2001, as part of a week-long Cape Town Pride event, from 10 to 17 December.

The 2001 event was met with a protest organised by local Anti-abortion organisations outside the Church of the Sacred Heart in Somerset Road where a Gay Pride "Dignity and Diversity" Interfaith Service was being held. A similar protest by religious groups occurred at the start of the 2024 Parade. However, the small group was essentially ignored, and did not manage to disrupt the march proceedings. The group of people was dispersed by police, and the Parade ended up taking place as planned.

Cape Town Pride was not held in 2003, when the event timing was moved to February.

In 2006, the event adopted the theme "Uniting Cultures of Cape Town", in 2007 "The Carnival of Love", in 2009 "Pink Ubuntu – Uniting Cultures of Cape Town", and in 2011 "Love Our Diversity".

== Events ==
Cape Town Pride includes the following events:

- Pre-Pride CTL Breakfast (before the Pride parade)
- Cape Town Pride March (the parade)
- Cape Town Pride Mardi Gras (the same day as the parade)
- Buddies Night Out - Pride Street Party (the night of the Pride parade)
- Pride Roller Disco (the evening of the Pride parade)
- Queer Surfing (the morning after the parade)
- Sexy Sunday Apres-Pride Lunch (the day after the parade)

Traditionally, the Cape Town Pride Parade is held on a Saturday at the beginning of March. It starts at the rainbow crosswalk in Somerset Road, in the Gayborhood of De Waterkant. It then goes along Somerset Road and Granger Bay Boulevard, and ends at the Green Point Track, where various Pride-related festivities are held. The Green Point Track event includes food and craft stalls for visitors.

While the end-of-parade event is ticketed (by means of online bookings for a low fee), the march is free to attend.

== Themes ==
Each year, Cape Town Pride has a particular theme. Some of these are in the table below.

Cape Town Pride Themes
Year	Theme
2006	Uniting Cultures of Cape Town
2007	The Carnival of Love
2009	Pink Ubuntu
2011	Love Our Diversity
2025	RainbowID

== Sponsors ==
Among the official sponsors of Cape Town Pride are; the City of Cape Town, Cape Town Tourism, the European Union, the Swedish Institute, and the Consulate General of Belgium in Cape Town.

== See also ==
- Pride parades in South Africa
- List of LGBT events in South Africa
