= List of heads of state of South Africa =

This is a list of the heads of state of South Africa from the foundation of the Union of South Africa in 1910 to the present day.

From 1910 to 1961 the head of state under the South Africa Act 1909 was the Monarch, who was the same person as the Monarch of the United Kingdom and of the other Dominions/Commonwealth realms. The Monarch was represented in South Africa by a Governor-General. South Africa became a republic under the Constitution of 1961 and the Monarch and Governor-General were replaced by a ceremonial State President. In 1984, under the Tricameral Constitution, the State President gained executive powers, becoming head of both state and government. Since 1994, under the Interim Constitution and the current Constitution, the head of state and government has been called the President.

== Monarchs (1910–1961) ==
The succession to the throne of South Africa was the same as the succession to the British throne. During the Abdication Crisis the South African parliament passed its own act, "His Majesty King Edward the Eighth's Abdication Act, 1937", to ratify the abdication of Edward VIII.

No.	Portrait	Name (Birth–Death)	Reign			Royal House	Prime Minister
No.	Portrait	Name (Birth–Death)	Reign start	Reign end	Duration	Royal House	Prime Minister
1		King George V (1865–1936)	31 May 1910	20 January 1936	25 years, 234 days	Saxe-Coburg and Gotha (until 17 July 1917); Windsor (since 17 July 1917)	Botha; Smuts; Hertzog
2		King Edward VIII (1894–1972)	20 January 1936	11 December 1936 (abdicated)	326 days	Windsor	Hertzog
3		King George VI (1895–1952)	11 December 1936	6 February 1952	15 years, 57 days	Windsor	Hertzog; Smuts; Malan
4		Queen Elizabeth II (1926–2022)	6 February 1952	31 May 1961	9 years, 114 days	Windsor	Malan; Strijdom; Verwoerd

=== Governor-General ===
The Governor-General was the representative of the monarch in South Africa and exercised most of the powers of the monarch. The Governor-General was appointed for an indefinite term, serving at the pleasure of the monarch. After the passage of the Statute of Westminster 1931 and the Status of the Union Act, 1934, the Governor-General was appointed solely on the advice of the Cabinet of South Africa without the involvement of the British government. In the event of a vacancy the Chief Justice served as Officer Administering the Government.

Status

Denotes Chief Justice acting as Officer Administering the Government

No.	Portrait	Name (Birth–Death)	Term of office			Monarch	Prime Minister
No.	Portrait	Name (Birth–Death)	Took office	Left office	Time in office	Monarch	Prime Minister
1		The Rt. Hon. The Viscount Gladstone (1854–1930)	31 May 1910	8 September 1914	4 years, 100 days	George V	Botha
2		The Rt. Hon. The Earl of Buxton (1853–1934)	8 September 1914	17 November 1920	6 years, 70 days	George V	Botha; Smuts
3		HRH Prince Arthur of Connaught (1883–1938)	17 November 1920	21 January 1924	3 years, 65 days	George V	Smuts
4		The Rt. Hon. The Earl of Athlone (1874–1957)	21 January 1924	26 January 1931	7 years, 5 days	George V	Smuts; Hertzog
5		The Rt. Hon. The Earl of Clarendon (1877–1955)	26 January 1931	5 April 1937	6 years, 69 days	George V Edward VIII; George VI	Hertzog
6		Sir Patrick Duncan (1870–1943)	5 April 1937	17 July 1943 (died in office)	6 years, 103 days	George VI	Hertzog; Smuts
—		Nicolaas Jacobus de Wet (1873–1960)	17 July 1943	1 January 1946	2 years, 168 days	George VI	Smuts
7		Gideon Brand van Zyl (1873–1956)	1 January 1946	1 January 1951	5 years	George VI	Smuts; Malan
8		Ernest George Jansen (1881–1959)	1 January 1951	25 November 1959 (died in office)	8 years, 328 days	George VI; Elizabeth II	Malan; Strijdom; Verwoerd
—		Lucas Cornelius Steyn (1903–1976)	25 November 1959	11 December 1959	16 days	Elizabeth II	Verwoerd
9		C. R. Swart (1894–1982)	11 December 1959	30 April 1961 (resigned)	1 year, 140 days	Elizabeth II	Verwoerd
—		Lucas Cornelius Steyn (1903–1976)	30 April 1961	31 May 1961	31 days	Elizabeth II	Verwoerd

== Ceremonial State President of South Africa (1961–1984) ==
Under the 1961 Constitution, the first constitution of the Republic of South Africa, the State President replaced the Monarch as ceremonial head of state. The State President was elected by Parliament for a seven-year term. In the event of a vacancy the President of the Senate served as Acting State President.

Status

Denotes President of the Senate acting as State President

No.	Portrait	Name (Birth–Death)	Elected	Term of office			Political party	Prime Minister
No.	Portrait	Name (Birth–Death)	Elected	Took office	Left office	Time in office	Political party	Prime Minister
10		C. R. Swart (1894–1982)	1961	31 May 1961	1 June 1967 (resigned)	6 years, 1 day	National Party	Verwoerd; Vorster
		Eben Dönges (1898–1968)	1967	Did not take office because of illness			National Party	
—		Tom Naudé (1889–1969)	—	1 June 1967	10 April 1968	314 days	National Party	Vorster
11		Jim Fouché (1898–1980)	1968	10 April 1968	9 April 1975	6 years, 364 days	National Party	Vorster
—		Jan de Klerk (1903–1979)	—	9 April 1975	19 April 1975	10 days	National Party	Vorster
12		Nico Diederichs (1903–1978)	1975	19 April 1975	21 August 1978 (died in office)	3 years, 124 days	National Party	Vorster
—		Marais Viljoen (1915–2007)	—	21 August 1978	10 October 1978	50 days	National Party	Vorster; Botha
13		B. J. Vorster (1915–1983)	1978	10 October 1978	4 June 1979 (resigned)	237 days	National Party	Botha
14		Marais Viljoen (1915–2007)	—	4 June 1979	19 June 1979	15 days	National Party	Botha
14		Marais Viljoen (1915–2007)	1979	19 June 1979	3 September 1984	5 years, 76 days	National Party	Botha

== Executive State President of South Africa (1984–1994) ==
Under the 1983 Constitution the State President was head of both state and government. The State President was elected by an electoral college chosen by Parliament and served until the next general election, but was eligible for re-election. In the event of a vacancy the Cabinet would nominate a member to serve as Acting State President.

Status

Denotes Acting State President

No.	Portrait	Name (Birth–Death)	Elected	Term of office			Political party
No.	Portrait	Name (Birth–Death)	Elected	Took office	Left office	Time in office	Political party
15		P. W. Botha (1916–2006)	—	3 September 1984	14 September 1984	11 days	National Party
15		P. W. Botha (1916–2006)	1984	14 September 1984	14 August 1989 (resigned)	4 years, 334 days	National Party
—		Chris Heunis (1927–2006)	—	19 January 1989	15 March 1989	55 days	National Party
16		F. W. de Klerk (1936–2021)	—	14 August 1989	20 September 1989	37 days	National Party
16		F. W. de Klerk (1936–2021)	1989	20 September 1989	10 May 1994	5 years, 56 days	National Party

== President of South Africa (1994–present) ==
Under the Interim Constitution and the current Constitution the president of South Africa is head of both state and government. The president is elected by the National Assembly and serves a term that expires at the next general election; a president may serve a maximum of two terms. In the event of a vacancy the deputy president serves as acting president.

Denotes Acting President

No.	Portrait	Name (Birth–Death)	Elected	Term of office			Political party
No.	Portrait	Name (Birth–Death)	Elected	Took office	Left office	Time in office	Political party
17		Nelson Mandela (1918–2013)	1994	10 May 1994	14 June 1999	5 years, 35 days	African National Congress
18		Thabo Mbeki (born 1942)	1999; 2004	14 June 1999	24 September 2008 (resigned)	9 years, 102 days	African National Congress
—		Ivy Matsepe-Casaburri (1937–2009)	—	25 September 2008		14 hours	African National Congress
19		Kgalema Motlanthe (born 1949)	2008	25 September 2008	9 May 2009	226 days	African National Congress
20		Jacob Zuma (born 1942)	2009; 2014	9 May 2009	14 February 2018 (resigned)	8 years, 281 days	African National Congress
21		Cyril Ramaphosa (born 1952)	—	14 February 2018	15 February 2018	1 day	African National Congress
21		Cyril Ramaphosa (born 1952)	2018; 2019; 2024	15 February 2018	Incumbent	8 years, 188 days	African National Congress

== Standards ==
Governor-General's Standard (1910–1931)

Governor-General's Standard (1931–1952)

Governor-General's Standard (1952–1961)

State Presidential Standard (1961–1984)

State Presidential Standard (1984–1994)
