= Republic of South Africa (1961–1984) =

South Africa under apartheid period

Republic of South Africa Republiek van Suid-Afrika
- 1961–1984
- Top: Flag (1928–1982); Bottom: Flag (1982–1994) Coat of arms
- Motto: Ex Unitate Vires (Latin) ("Unity is Strength")
- Anthem: "Die Stem van Suid-Afrika"
- South Africa with South West Africa shown in light green (occupied in 1915 and administered under a mandate; occupation declared illegal in 1966)
- Capital: Cape Town (legislative); Pretoria (administrative); Bloemfontein (judicial)
- Largest city: Johannesburg
- Official languages: Afrikaans (Note: Dutch included under Afrikaans until 1983.); English
- Ethnic groups (1960): 68.3% Black; 19.2% White; 9.4% Coloured; 3.0% Indian
- Government: Unitary parliamentary republic under a herrenvolk democracy
- State President
  - 1961-1967 (first): C. R. Swart
  - 1979-1984 (last): Marais Viljoen
- Prime Minister
  - 1961-1966: H. F. Verwoerd
  - 1966-1978: B. J. Vorster
  - 1978-1984: P. W. Botha
- Legislature: Parliament
  - Upper house: Senate (Note: The Senate was abolished and replaced with the President's Council in 1981. The council was not a legislative body, therefore, up until 1984, the Parliament was unicameral.)
  - Lower house: House of Assembly (Note: Sole parliamentary chamber between 1981 and 1984.)
- Historical era: Cold War
  - Republic established: 31 May 1961
  - Constitutional change: 3 September 1984

Area
  - Total: 2,045,329 km^{2} (789,706 sq mi)

Population
  - 1980 census: 28,900,000
- Currency: South African rand
Preceded by
Union of South Africa
Succeeded by
Republic of South Africa (1984–1994)
Transkei
Bophuthatswana
Venda
Ciskei
- Today part of: Namibia; South Africa

In the aftermath of the constitutional referendum of 1960, the Republic of South Africa (Afrikaans: Republiek van Suid-Afrika) came into existence on 31 May 1961, marking the country's formal departure from the British Commonwealth and establishing it as a sovereign republic. This period, which lasted until the introduction of a new constitution in 1984, was defined by the consolidation and intensification of apartheid, escalating internal resistance, the development of nuclear weapons, and mounting global condemnation.

The Republic's foundation was intrinsically linked to the ideology of the ruling National Party, which had institutionalized apartheid — a comprehensive framework of racial segregation and discrimination — since 1948. The subsequent three decades saw the harsh enforcement of policies that classified all citizens by race, restricted the rights and movements of the non-white majority, and created self-governing homelands for them. This era was characterised by immense internal repression, including the Sharpeville Massacre, the Soweto Uprising, and the banning of liberation and anti-apartheid movements like the African National Congress (ANC) and the Pan Africanist Congress (PAC).

Mounting internal resistance and sustained international pressure, including economic sanctions and cultural isolation, increasingly isolated South Africa. The political landscape shifted dramatically in the late 1970s when Prime Minister B. J. Vorster was forced to resign in the wake of the Muldergate scandal, a covert scheme involving a secret slush fund used to manipulate domestic media and buy influence abroad. He was succeeded by P. W. Botha, who aggressively consolidated power around the executive, sidelining cabinet and parliamentary opposition while advancing a securitised "Total Strategy" to counter perceived threats to white rule. This centralisation of authority culminated in 1984, when the government attempted to co-opt Coloured and Indian populations through a new constitution that created a Tricameral Parliament with an all-powerful executive presidency, while continuing to exclude the Black majority. Far from stabilising the system, this manoeuvre galvanised the formation of the United Democratic Front (UDF) and ignited a fresh wave of nationwide protest, setting the stage for the eventual crisis and dismantling of apartheid.

== Establishment ==
The National Party had been seeking the establishment of a republican South African state following their victory in the 1948 elections. The decisive step was a whites-only referendum held on 5 October 1960, which posed a simple question: “Are you in favour of a Republic for the Union?” Amid heightened political tension following the Sharpeville massacre in March that year and the subsequent banning of the African National Congress and Pan Africanist Congress, the proposal was carried with 52.29% of the vote. Support was concentrated in the Afrikaner heartland of the Transvaal and Orange Free State, while the predominantly English-speaking province of Natal voted firmly against. The narrow margin underscored the deep ethnic cleavage within the white electorate.

Parliament subsequently passed the Republic of South Africa Constitution Act, which received royal assent on 24 April 1961 and came into force on 31 May, a date deliberately chosen to coincide with the anniversary of the 1902 Treaty of Vereeniging that ended the Second Boer War. The new constitution was largely a technical adjustment: it replaced the British monarch with a State President as ceremonial head of state, while retaining the Westminster-style parliamentary system with a Prime Minister as head of government. Charles Robberts Swart, the last Governor-General, was sworn in as the first State President in Pretoria. The Union’s four provinces — Cape, Natal, Transvaal, and the Orange Free State — continued unchanged, and the Union's national flag of remained in use.

== Verwoerd premiership ==
=== Consolidation of the system ===
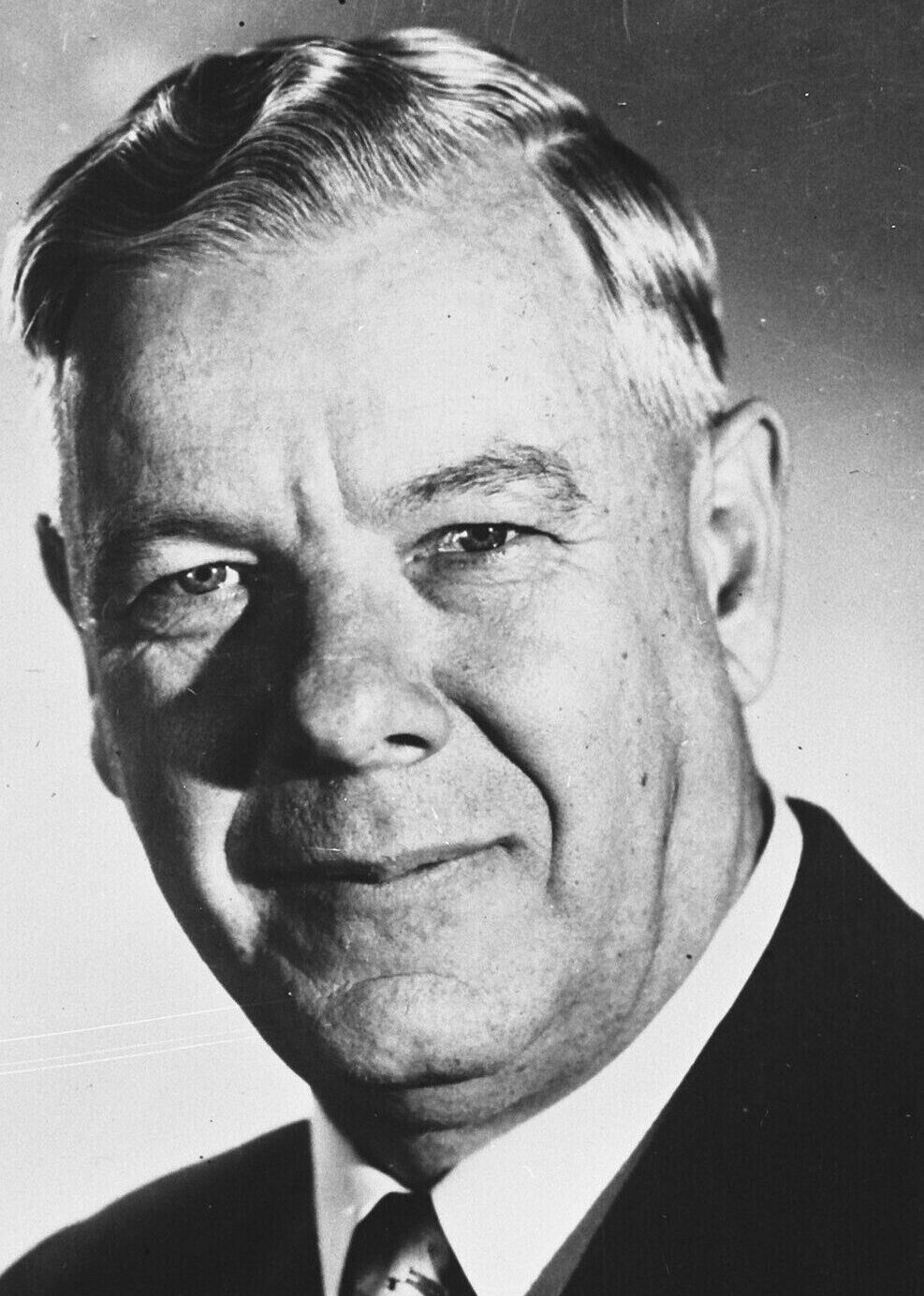
Hendrik Verwoerd, prime minister (1958-1966)

With the constitutional question settled, Verwoerd’s government proceeded to entrench the framework of separate development. The centrepiece of this programme was the creation of self-governing ethnic homelands, or bantustans, intended to channel black political aspirations away from the common South African polity. In 1963 the Transkei was granted self-government, establishing a legislative assembly and a chief minister. Though nominally autonomous, the Transkei remained heavily dependent on financial subsidies from Pretoria and its foreign relations, defence, and internal security remained under Republic's control. This served as the model for the further introduction of self-government for other similar areas.

A flurry of legislation tightened racial control. The Bantu Laws Amendment Act of 1963 circumscribed the limited rights of black urban residents, while the Coloured Persons Education Act of the same year transferred control of coloured schooling from provinces to the central government, enforcing separation and inequality. The Group Areas Act continued to uproot non-white communities from areas declared white, with forced removals escalating throughout the period.

=== Internal resistance and state crackdown ===
The banning of the African National Congress (ANC) and the Pan Africanist Congress (PAC) in 1960 pushed the liberation movements underground and towards armed struggle. On 16 December 1961, uMkhonto weSizwe (MK), the military wing of the ANC and the South African Communist Party, launched a sabotage campaign with a series of bombings against government installations and power lines. The PAC’s armed wing, Poqo, carried out attacks and a planned uprising in the Transkei.

The government responded with draconian security legislation. The General Law Amendment Act of 1963, commonly known as the "90-day detention law", empowered police to detain any person without warrant and hold them in solitary confinement for up to 90 days without access to legal counsel. The General Law Amendment Act of 1962 had already introduced the offence of sabotage with a minimum sentence of five years and the possibility of the death penalty, and placed the burden of proof on the accused. These laws were used extensively to crush dissent.

The climax of the crackdown came with the raid on Liliesleaf Farm in Rivonia in July 1963, which led to the arrest of the MK high command. In the subsequent Rivonia Trial, Nelson Mandela, Walter Sisulu, Govan Mbeki, and five others were convicted of sabotage and sentenced to life imprisonment. Mandela’s powerful speech from the dock became a symbolic moment of resistance, but the trial effectively decapitated the armed struggle inside the country. By the mid-1960s, the security police had dismantled the underground networks of both the ANC and PAC, and the exile movements would spend the remainder of the decade rebuilding.

=== Economic prosperity and internal stability ===
For the white population, the early 1960s were a time of economic growth and rising living standards. The economy expanded rapidly, driven by mining, manufacturing, and infrastructure projects. Cheap black labour, controlled influx through pass laws, and the absence of trade union rights for black workers kept labour costs low and industrial profits high. Afrikaner capital benefited from state patronage, and the government promoted the movement of Afrikaners into managerial and professional roles. This economic success shored up white support for the National Party, which increased its parliamentary majority in the 1966 general election.

=== Verwoerd's assassination ===
Verwoerd’s premiership came to an end on 6 September 1966, when he was stabbed four times in the neck and chest on the floor of the House of Assembly by Dimitri Tsafendas, a parliamentary messenger.Tsafendas was declared mentally unfit to stand trial and was institutionalised for the remainder of his life, but his act sent shockwaves through the country and the world. Verwoerd was succeeded by B. J. Vorster, who would continue and intensify the policies of his predecessor while steering the Republic through a more volatile phase of resistance.

== Vorster premiership ==
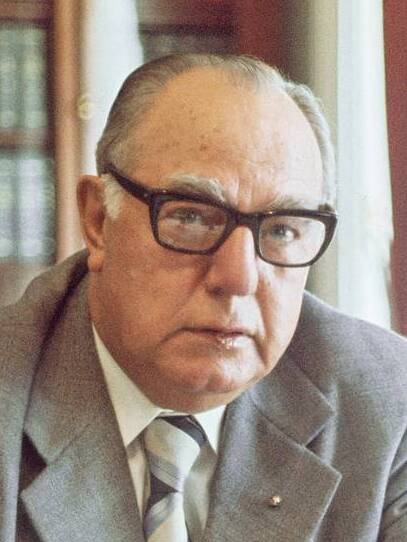
B. J. Vorster, prime minister (1966-1978)

B. J. Vorster entered office with a reputation as an uncompromising security enforcer. As Minister of Justice, he had overseen the 90-day detention law and the crushing of the internal armed struggle under Verwoerd. As Prime Minister, he expanded the security apparatus considerably. The Terrorism Act of 1967 introduced indefinite detention without trial for those suspected of activities endangering law and order, a definition so broad it could be applied to almost any form of dissent. Security police powers grew unchecked, and torture in detention became systematic.

The Bantustan project accelerated. The Bantu Homelands Citizenship Act of 1970 stripped all black South Africans of their South African citizenship and assigned them citizenship of an ethnic homeland, regardless of whether they had ever lived there. The aim was to render the black majority officially foreign in “white South Africa”, thereby denying them permanent political rights. Transkei received nominal independence in 1976, followed by Bophuthatswana in 1977, though no state other than South Africa recognised these entities. The programme was condemned internationally as a fraudulent exercise in displacement.

=== State security ===
To coordinate the expanding security apparatus, the government created the Bureau of State Security (BOSS) in 1969. Operating under the direct control of the Prime Minister, BOSS was responsible for intelligence collection at home and abroad. It swiftly gained notoriety for its covert operations, infiltration of anti-apartheid organisations, and routine use of torture. The agency functioned with minimal parliamentary oversight and acted as a central pillar of the security strategy. A further layer of executive security control was institutionalised with the establishment of the State Security Council (SSC) in 1972. The SSC brought together key ministers, military chiefs, and intelligence heads under the Prime Minister's chairmanship to coordinate national security policy, effectively operating as a shadow cabinet that bypassed normal cabinet procedures in matters of state security.

=== Foreign policy ===
Vorster attempted to break out of diplomatic isolation through an "outward-looking" foreign policy. Seeking allies on the African continent, he cultivated relations with moderate African states, most notably Hastings Kamuzu Banda’s Malawi, which established full diplomatic ties in 1967. Quiet dialogue with other leaders, including Zambia’s Kenneth Kaunda, led to limited détente, while South African goods, technical assistance, and loans were offered as bait.

The outward-looking strategy was constrained by the fundamental incompatibility between apartheid and African nationalism. Pretoria’s continued occupation of South West Africa (Namibia) in defiance of United Nations resolutions and its military involvement in Rhodesia and Angola deepened African hostility. A secret dialogue with the ANC and other external movements, pursued sporadically, yielded no political breakthrough.

=== Economic growth and migrant labour ===
The South African economy boomed during the late 1960s and early 1970s, recording growth rates among the highest in the world. Manufacturing and mining attracted massive foreign investment, and the white standard of living rose dramatically. This prosperity was underwritten by the migrant labour system, which ensured a constant flow of cheap black labour into urban areas while denying workers the right to settle with their families. Strikes by black workers were illegal until a limited recognition of trade union rights was conceded in 1979, following years of wildcat action and international pressure. The Durban strikes of 1973, involving tens of thousands of black workers, signalled a resurgence of labour militancy that the security apparatus could not easily suppress.

=== Soweto uprising ===
The political calm shattered on 16 June 1976, when thousands of black schoolchildren in Soweto marched to protest the compulsory use of Afrikaans as a medium of instruction in black schools. Police opened fire on the unarmed students, triggering a nationwide protests and riots that raged for months. The images of children being shot, and the photograph of a dying Hector Pieterson carried by a fellow student, became iconic symbols of apartheid brutality and galvanised global condemnation.

The uprising proved a turning point by unleashing a wave of militancy among black youth, many of whom fled the country to join the armed wings of the ANC and PAC. It also prompted the United Nations Security Council to impose a mandatory arms embargo on South Africa in November 1977, marking a dramatic escalation in international sanctions. Domestically, it shattered the myth of white invincibility and forced the state into a permanent crisis management posture.

=== Muldergate scandal ===
In 1977, it emerged that the Department of Information, under Minister Connie Mulder and Secretary Eschel Rhoodie, had secretly used public funds to launch a covert propaganda campaign to influence international opinion. Operations included attempts to buy foreign newspapers, establish a front publication The Citizen, and cultivate political support abroad.The scandal widened when it was revealed that funds had been diverted without parliamentary authorisation, and that senior government figures, including Vorster himself, were implicated.

A judicial commission of inquiry began uncovering the full extent of the covert programme in 1978.Vorster, under mounting pressure, attempted to limit the damage, but the ensuing political firestorm forced him to resign as Prime Minister on 2 October 1978. He was elevated to the ceremonial position of State President, but a further commission confirmed his complicity, and he resigned that post too in June 1979, departing public life in disgrace. The scandal exposed the ruthless and unaccountable nature of the government, and cleared the path for Defence Minister P. W. Botha to seize the premiership and chart a more aggressively centralised course.

== Botha premiership ==
P. W. Botha had served as Minister of Defence since 1966 and was the longest-serving member of the cabinet, having entered Parliament in the 1948 General election. His power base lay in the military and the broader security establishment, which under his tenure had expanded dramatically in budget, capability, and political influence. The Muldergate scandal had discredited the civilian leadership of the National Party and left a vacuum that Botha, positioning himself as the candidate of order and reform, was well placed to fill. After narrowly defeating Connie Mulder in the party caucus, he assumed the premiership with a mandate to restore the government’s credibility and confront what he described as a "total onslaught" (Afrikaans: totale aanslag) against South Africa.

=== Total strategy ===
Botha’s defining ideological framework was the doctrine of "Total National Strategy". This posited that South Africa faced a coordinated, multi-dimensional assault directed from Moscow and waged through frontline states, the ANC, and internal dissent. In response, the state would mobilise all its resources in a unified counter-strategy that blended military force, intelligence, political reform, and social engineering.

The institutional vehicle for this policy was a vast expansion of the State Security Council, which under Botha evolved from an advisory body into a de facto inner cabinet. A National Security Management System (NSMS) was created, stretching from the SSC at the apex down to local security committees in every district. The military and intelligence services, including the South African Defence Force (SADF) and the reformed National Intelligence Service (NIS), gained pre-eminence in policy formulation, often bypassing the formal cabinet and the constraints of parliamentary oversight. Botha simultaneously accumulated offices, retaining the Defence portfolio for his first years as Prime Minister, and concentrated decision-making in a tight circle of loyal securocrats. This shift transformed the premiership into an increasingly powerful office long before the constitutional change that established an executive presidency.

=== Parallel reforms and repression ===
Botha’s Total Strategy was accompanied by a calculated, if limited, programme of internal reform designed to win allies abroad, stabilise labour relations, and fragment the opposition. The most significant changes followed the reports of two government-appointed commissions. The Wiehahn Commission on labour legislation led in 1979 to the legal recognition of black trade unions and the abolition of job reservation by race, conceding organised labour rights to an emerging black working class while seeking to channel its militancy into regulated industrial bargaining. The Riekert Commission on influx control recommended the relaxation of certain pass laws for a favoured stratum of urban black residents, while tightening controls on the unemployed and rural-dwelling majority.

These reforms were paired with relentless repression. State of emergency was periodically imposed in black townships, and the security police and army carried out cross-border raids into neighbouring states, including strikes against ANC targets in Mozambique, Lesotho, and Angola, in a doctrine of pre-emptive and punitive action. Political activists continued to be banned, detained without trial, and assassinated by state operatives. The regime thus pursued a dual path: co-optation of a black urban elite and ruthless suppression of organised opposition.

=== Constitutional reform ===
The centrepiece of Botha’s constitutional reform was the creation of a new parliamentary structure designed to split the non-white population and preserve white supremacy in a modernised form. A white-only referendum in November 1983 approved the Republic of South Africa Constitution Act of 1983, which came into effect in September 1984. It replaced the Westminster-style parliamentary system with a Tricameral Parliament comprising three separate chambers: the House of Assembly for whites, the House of Representatives for Coloureds, and the House of Delegates for Indians. The black majority remained entirely excluded from central government, its political rights confined to the bantustan system under the theory that they were citizens of independent homelands.

The 1983 constitution abolished the office of Prime Minister and created an executive State Presidency with extensive powers, vested in Botha upon the constitution’s implementation. The State President presided over the multi-chamber legislature, chaired the President’s Council that adjudicated disputes between houses, and commanded the armed forces and security services. This arrangement gave Botha an unparalleled concentration of authority, insulating executive action from even the limited parliamentary scrutiny that had existed before.

The constitutional proposals provoked a powerful backlash among those excluded and their allies. In August 1983, hundreds of community, student, church, and labour organisations coalesced into the United Democratic Front (UDF), an internal popular movement committed to opposing the Tricameral Parliament and mobilising for a non-racial South Africa. The UDF aligned itself broadly with the principles of the exiled ANC and adopted the Freedom Charter as its guiding vision, though it remained a legally operating coalition of affiliates.

When elections for the Coloured and Indian houses were held in August 1984, they were met with widespread boycotts, protests, and violence. Turnout was low, and the newly elected chambers were widely reviled as illegitimate. The UDF’s campaign of non-cooperation and mass mobilisation in the townships of the Transvaal sparked a sustained uprising that by late 1984 had made large parts of the country ungovernable. The state responded with the deployment of troops into townships and the imposition of a partial state of emergency, but the insurrection continued to escalate. The Tricameral Parliament, far from stabilising the political order, had catalysed the most intense internal crisis the Republic had ever faced, setting the stage for the turbulent years of nationwide revolt that defined the remainder of the decade.

== Leadership ==
State President of the Republic of South Africa
Symbols

and "acting" denotes acting president

No.	Portrait	Name (Birth–Death)	Term of office			Political party	Elected
No.	Portrait	Name (Birth–Death)	Took office	Left office	Time in office	Political party	Elected
1		C. R. Swart (1894–1982)	31 May 1961	31 May 1967	6 years	National Party	1961
—		Eben Dönges (1898–1968)	Elected, but did not take office because of illness			National Party	1967
—		Tom Naudé (1889–1969) acting	1 June 1967	10 April 1968	314 days	National Party	—
2		Jim Fouché (1898–1980)	10 April 1968	9 April 1975	6 years, 364 days	National Party	1968
—		Jan de Klerk (1903–1979) acting	9 April 1975	19 April 1975	10 days	National Party	—
3		Nico Diederichs (1903–1978)	19 April 1975	21 August 1978 (died in office)	3 years, 124 days	National Party	1975
—		Marais Viljoen (1915–2007) acting	21 August 1978	10 October 1978	50 days	National Party	—
4		B. J. Vorster (1915–1983)	10 October 1978	4 June 1979 (resigned)	237 days	National Party	1978
—		Marais Viljoen (1915–2007)	4 June 1979	19 June 1979	15 days	National Party	–
5		Marais Viljoen (1915–2007)	19 June 1979	3 September 1984	5 years, 91 days	National Party	1979

Prime Ministers
No.	Portrait	Name (Birth–Death)	Term of office					
1		Hendrik Verwoerd (1901–1966); MP for Heidelberg, Transvaal Province	31 May 1961	6 September 1966	5 years, 4 days	— (12th); 1961 (13th); 1966 (14th)	National Party	Verwoerd I–II
1		Hendrik Verwoerd (1901–1966); MP for Heidelberg, Transvaal Province	Start of the South African Border War. The Wind of Change speech by British PM Harold Macmillan. Proclaimed South Africa a Republic outside the Commonwealth of Nations on 31 May 1961 after the 1960 referendum. Abolished the separate Black voters roll. Launched the bantustan programme. Assassinated.					
2		B. J. Vorster (1915–1983); MP for Nigel, Transvaal Province	13 September 1966	2 October 1978	12 years, 19 days	— (14th); 1970 (15th); 1974 (16th); 1977 (17th)	National Party	Vorster I–II–III
2		B. J. Vorster (1915–1983); MP for Nigel, Transvaal Province	Abolished the Coloured voters roll. South African Border War escalated into a full-scale conflict. He managed policy of détente with African countries, and accepted to let black African diplomats living in white areas. He alienated an extremist faction of his National Party when it accepted the presence of Māori players and spectators during the 1970 New Zealand rugby union tour of South Africa. He unofficially supported, but refused to recognize officially, the neighbouring state of Rhodesia, which was ruled by a white minority government that had unilaterally declared independence from United Kingdom. In 1974, under pressure from US Secretary of State Henry Kissinger he pressured Ian Smith, the Prime Minister of Rhodesia, to accept in principle that white minority rule could not continue indefinitely. Resigned.					
3		P. W. Botha (1916–2006); MP for George, Cape Province	9 October 1978	14 September 1984	5 years, 341 days	— (17th); 1981 (18th); 1984 (19th)	National Party	P. W. Botha
3		P. W. Botha (1916–2006); MP for George, Cape Province	Remained Minister of Defence until 1980. Improved relations with the West. Authorized radical constitutional reform in 1983, including the creation of the Tricameral Parliament, which give a limited political voice to the country's Coloured and Indian population groups. The majority Black population group was still excluded. Began a secret nuclear weapons program in collaboration with Israel, which culminated in the production of six nuclear bombs. Creation of police counter-insurgency unit, Koevoet. Resignation of Vorster as State President in the wake of the Muldergate Scandal. Abolished the position of Prime Minister in 1984 and became executive State President.					
