= List of South African presidents by age =

This is a list of presidents of South Africa by age, including state presidents (1961 to 1994) and presidents (since 1994).

This table lists presidents by age at assuming office from youngest to oldest

Name	Date of birth	Date of death	Date and age at inauguration
F. W. de Klerk	18 March 1936	11 November 2021	15 August 1989 (aged 53)
Thabo Mbeki	18 June 1942	alive	16 June 1999 (aged 56)
Kgalema Motlanthe	19 July 1949	alive	25 September 2008 (aged 59)
B. J. Vorster	13 December 1915	10 September 1983	10 October 1978 (aged 62)
Marais Viljoen	2 December 1915	4 January 2007	4 June 1979 (aged 63)
Cyril Ramaphosa	17 November 1952	alive	14 February 2018 (aged 65)
Charles Robberts Swart	5 December 1894	16 July 1982	31 May 1961 (aged 66)
Jacob Zuma	12 April 1942	alive	9 May 2009 (aged 67)
P. W. Botha	12 January 1916	31 October 2006	3 September 1984 (aged 68)
Jacobus Johannes Fouché	6 June 1898	23 September 1980	10 April 1968 (aged 69)
Nico Diederichs	17 November 1903	21 August 1978	19 April 1975 (aged 71)
Nelson Mandela	18 July 1918	5 December 2013	10 May 1994 (aged 75)

== List of presidents by longevity ==
Rank	Heads of state	Date of birth	Date of death	Longevity (Years, Days)	Longevity (Days)
1	Nelson Mandela	18 July 1918	5 December 2013	95 years, 140 days	34,839 days
2	Marais Viljoen	2 December 1915	4 January 2007	91 years, 33 days	33,271 days
3	P. W. Botha	12 January 1916	31 October 2006	90 years, 292 days	33,165 days
4	Charles Robberts Swart	5 December 1894	16 July 1982	87 years, 223 days	31,999 days
5	Frederik de Klerk	18 March 1936	11 November 2021	85 years, 238 days	31,284 days
6	Jacob Zuma	12 April 1942	Living	83 years, 202 days	30,518 days
7	Thabo Mbeki	18 June 1942	Living	83 years, 135 days	30,451 days
8	Jacobus Johannes Fouché	6 June 1898	23 September 1980	82 years, 109 days	30,059 days
9	Kgalema Motlanthe	19 July 1949	Living	76 years, 104 days	27,863 days
10	Nico Diederichs	17 November 1903	21 August 1978	74 years, 277 days	27,306 days
11	Cyril Ramaphosa	17 November 1952	Living	72 years, 348 days	26,646 days
12	B. J. Vorster	13 December 1915	10 September 1983	67 years, 271 days	24,743 days

List of heads of state of South Africa	12
Living	4
Deceased	8

== South African heads of state's ages ==
#	Head of state	Date of birth	Date of inauguration	Age at inauguration	End of term	Age at End of term	Length of retirement	Date of death	Lifespan
1	Charles Robberts Swart	5 December 1894	31 May 1961	66 years, 177 days	1 June 1967	72 years, 178 days	15 years, 45 days	16 July 1982	31,999 days (87 years, 223 days)
2	Jacobus Johannes Fouché	6 June 1898	10 April 1968	69 years, 309 days	9 April 1975	76 years, 307 days	5 years, 167 days	23 September 1980	30,059 days (82 years, 109 days)
3	Nico Diederichs	17 November 1903	19 April 1975	71 years, 153 days	21 August 1978	74 years, 277 days	N/A	21 August 1978	27,306 days (74 years, 277 days)
4	B. J. Vorster	13 December 1915	10 October 1978	62 years, 301 days	4 June 1979	63 years, 173 days	4 years, 98 days	10 September 1983	24,743 days (67 years, 271 days)
5	Marais Viljoen	2 December 1915	4 June 1979	63 years, 184 days	3 September 1984	68 years, 276 days	22 years, 123 days	4 January 2007	33,271 days (91 years, 33 days)
6	P. W. Botha	12 January 1916	3 September 1984	68 years, 235 days	15 August 1989	73 years, 215 days	17 years, 77 days	31 October 2006	33,165 days (90 years, 292 days)
7	Frederik de Klerk	18 March 1936	15 August 1989	53 years, 150 days	10 May 1994	58 years, 53 days	27 years, 185 days	11 November 2021	31,284 days (85 years, 238 days)
8	Nelson Mandela	18 July 1918	10 May 1994	75 years, 305 days	16 June 1999	80 years, 333 days	14 years, 172 days	5 December 2013	34,839 days (95 years, 140 days)
9	Thabo Mbeki	18 June 1942	16 June 1999	56 years, 363 days	24 September 2008	66 years, 98 days	17 years, 37 days	(living)	30,451 days (83 years, 135 days)
10	Kgalema Motlanthe	19 July 1949	25 September 2008	59 years, 68 days	9 May 2009	59 years, 294 days	16 years, 175 days	(living)	27,863 days (76 years, 104 days)
11	Jacob Zuma	12 April 1942	9 May 2009	67 years, 27 days	14 February 2018	75 years, 308 days	7 years, 259 days	(living)	30,518 days (83 years, 202 days)
12	Cyril Ramaphosa	17 November 1952	14 February 2018	65 years, 89 days	(incumbent)	(incumbent)	(incumbent)	(living)	26,646 days (72 years, 348 days)
#	Head of state	Date of birth	Date of inauguration	Age at inauguration	End of term	Age at End of term	Length of retirement	Date of death	Lifespan
