= Second cabinet of John Vorster =

Second Vorster Cabinet
- 4th Cabinet of the Republic of South Africa (since the 1961 Constitution)
- 1970–1974
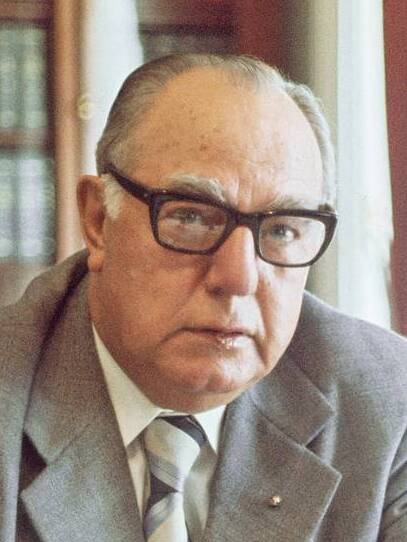
- Johannes Vorster (1978)
- Date formed: 18 May 1970
- Date dissolved: 29 April 1974 (3 years, 11 months and 11 days)

People and organisations
- State President: Jacobus Fouché
- Prime Minister: Johannes Vorster
- Member parties: National Party
- Status in legislature: Majority
- Opposition parties: United Party
- Opposition leaders: De Villiers Graaff

History
- Election: 1970 election
- Predecessor: Vorster I
- Successor: Vorster III

Ministry/Portfolio	Minister/Incumbent	Start	End
Prime Minister	Johannes Vorster	18 May 1970	29 April 1974
Minister of Foreign Affairs	Hilgard Muller	18 May 1970	29 April 1974
Minister of Defense	Pieter Botha	18 May 1970	29 April 1974
Minister of Finance	Nicolaas Diederichs	18 May 1970	29 April 1974
Minister of Home Affairs	Marais Viljoen; Theo Gerdener; Connie Mulder	18 May 1970	29 April 1974
Minister of Immigration	Connie Mulder; Piet Koornhof	18 May 1970; 1972	1972; 29 April 1974
Minister of Information	Connie Mulder	18 May 1970	29 April 1974
Minister of Justice and Prisons	Petrus Cornelius Pelser	18 May 1970	29 April 1974
Minister of Police	Lourens Muller	18 May 1970	29 April 1974
Minister of Transport	Ben Schoeman	18 May 1970	29 April 1974
Minister of Labour	Marais Viljoen	18 May 1970	29 April 1974
Minister of Mining	Carel de Wet; Piet Koornhof	18 May 1970	29 April 1974
Minister of Sports and Recreation	Frank Waring; Piet Koornhof	18 May 1970	29 April 1974
Minister of the Economy	Lourens Muller	18 May 1970	29 April 1974
Minister of Bantu Administration and Bantu Education	M. C. Botha	18 May 1970	29 April 1974
Minister of National Education	Johannes van der Spuy	18 May 1970	29 April 1974
Minister of Public Works	Blaar Coetzee; Abraham du Plessis	18 May 1970	29 April 1974
Minister of Agriculture	D. C. H. Uys; Hendrik Schoeman	18 May 1970; 1972	1972; 29 April 1974
Minister of Water Affairs and Forestry	Fanie Botha	18 May 1970	29 April 1974
Minister of Welfare and Pensions	Connie Mulder; Johannes van der Spuy	18 May 1970	29 April 1974
Minister of Post, Telegraphs and Telecommunication	Marais Viljoen	18 May 1970	29 April 1974
Minister of Health	Carel de Wet; Schalk van der Merwe	18 May 1970; 1972	1972; 29 April 1974
Minister of the Environment	Jannie Loots	1973	29 April 1974
Minister of Planning and Statistics	Jannie Loots	18 May 1970	29 April 1974
Minister of Tourism and Minister of Indian Affairs	Frank Waring; Owen Horwood	18 May 1970; 1972	1972; 29 April 1974
Minister of Coloured Affairs and Matters of the Rehoboth Homeland	Jannie Loots; Schalk van der Merwe	18 May 1970; 1972	1972; 29 April 1974
