= 1967 South African presidential election =

- February 28, 1967

223 votes in the Parliament of South Africa 112 votes needed to win
- Turnout: 96.42%
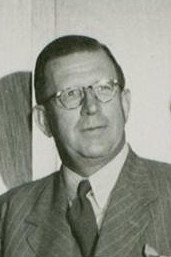

Nominee	T. E. Dönges	P. V. van der Byl
Party	National	United
Electoral vote	163	52
Percentage	75.81%	24.19%
- Results of the election. Dönges (orange) received 163 votes while Van der Byl (blue) received 52.
State President before election
Charles Robberts Swart
National
State President after election
T. E. Dönges †
Tom Naudé as acting president
National

The 1967 South African presidential election pitted Theophilus Ebenhaezer Dönges against Major Pieter Voltelyn Graham van der Byl. In accordance with the South African Constitution of 1961, the South African Parliament had the task of electing a person as State President, the ceremonial head of state.

On January 19, 1967, the caucus of parliamentarians from the National Party proposed Dönges to succeed Charles Robberts Swart as State President. In the group, he won against Jan de Klerk and against J. J. Fouché, who was elected the South African head of state a year later in 1968. Dönges was elected as State President on February 26 with 163 votes in the second round against 52 votes for van der Byl, the United Party candidate.

In May 1967, Dönges suffered a brain hemorrhage that plunged him into a coma, three weeks before his swearing in and the inauguration of his presidential term, which was to take place on June 1. As a result, the President of the South African Senate, Jozua François Naudé, served as Acting State President until Donges was fit to take office. On June 10, Dönges suffered a delicate surgery on the brain. His condition improved, but on October 3, 1967, he suffered a stroke. It was through his lawyer that he resigned on December 6. He died on January 10, 1968, at the Groote Schuur Hospital in Cape Town, without ever having regained consciousness and without being able to exercise the office of State President.
