= 1979 South African presidential election =

- 19 June 1979
- Turnout: 88.64%
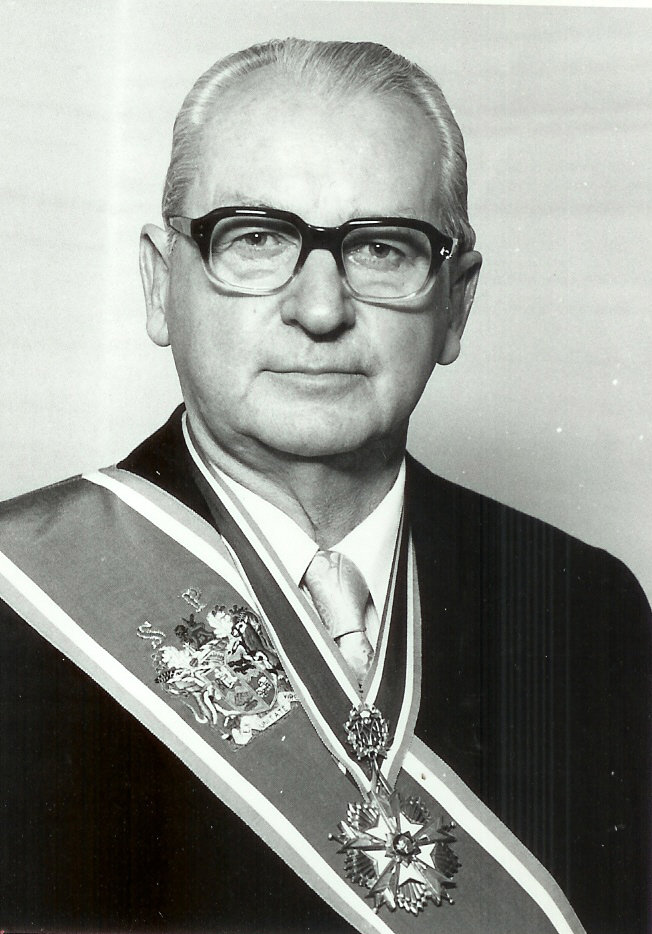

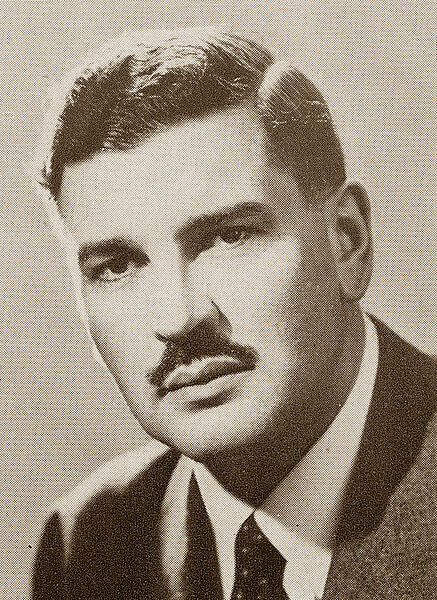

Nominee	Marais Viljoen	De Villiers Graaff	Guerino Bozzoli
Party	National	New Republic	Progressive
Electoral vote	155	23	17
Percentage	79.49%	11.79%	8.72%
- Results of the election. Viljoen (orange) received 155 votes while Graaf received 23 and Bozzoli 17.
State President before election
Marais Viljoen (Acting)
National
Elected State President
Marais Viljoen
National

The 1979 South African presidential election pitted the President of the South African Senate Marais Viljoen, backed by the ruling National Party, against the former United Party leader De Villiers Graaff, backed by the New Republic Party, and the Deputy Chancellor of the University of the Witwatersrand, Guerino Bozzoli, supported by the Progressive Federal Party. In accordance with the South African Constitution of 1961, the State President, a largely ceremonial post, was elected by a joint sitting of both houses of the South African Parliament. Both Bozzoli and Graaff had already been candidates for the presidential election of September 1978.

The election, following the resignation of State President and former Prime Minister B. J. Vorster less than a year after his election, was won by Marais Viljoen, who had been Acting State President in his capacity as President of the Senate since June 4. The National Party had nominated Viljoen, rather than Transport Minister Lourens Muller, as its candidate on June 14. A joint session both houses of parliament voted along party lines on June 19, 1979, after which Viljoen was sworn in 90 minutes after his election.
