= 1984 South African presidential election =

- September 5, 1984

88 votes in the Electoral College 45 votes needed to win
- Turnout: 100%
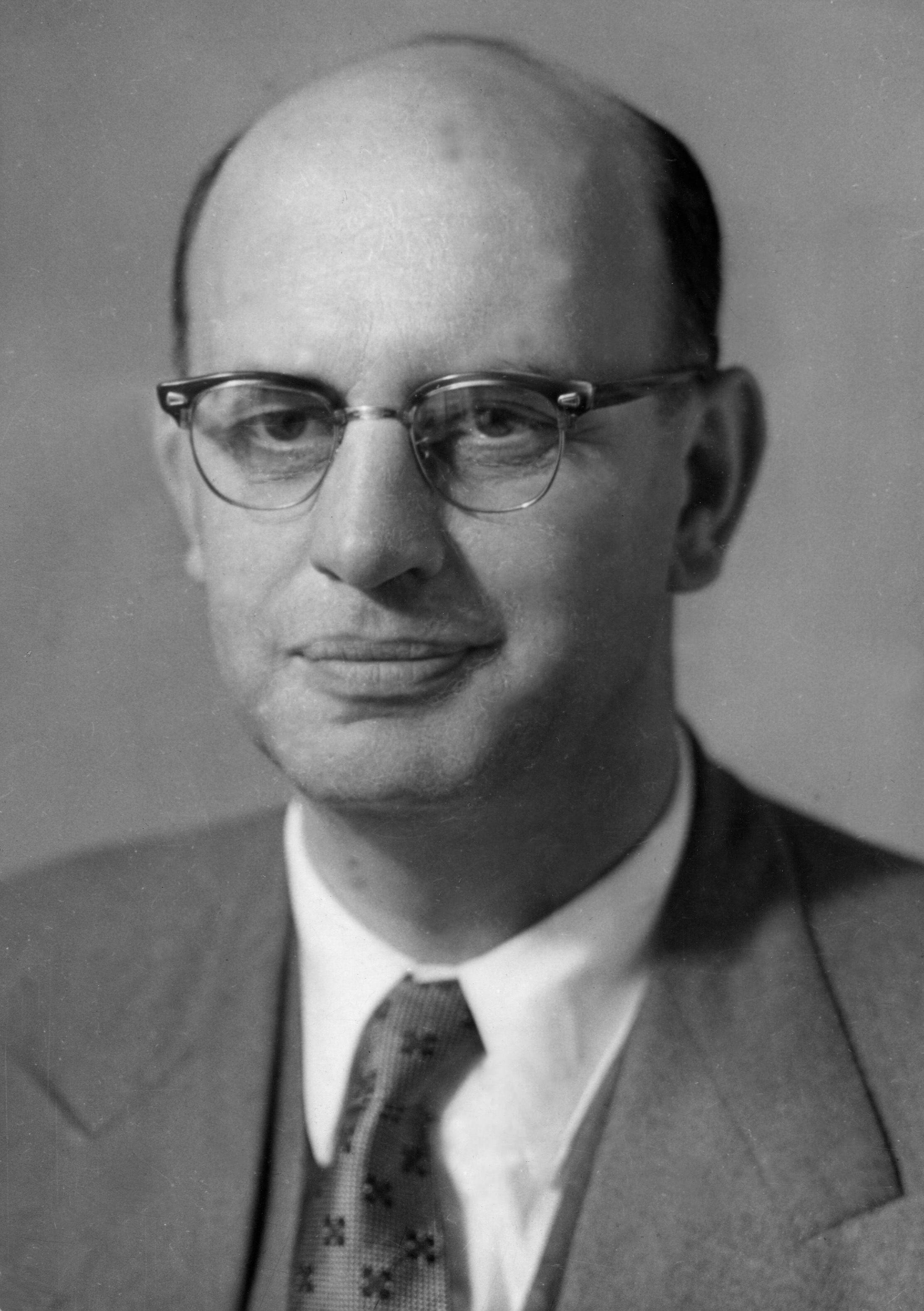
Nominee	P. W. Botha
Party	National
Electoral vote	88
Percentage	100%
- Results of the election. Botha received all 88 votes in the electoral college.
State President before election
Marais Viljoen (ceremonial)
National
Elected State President
P. W. Botha
National

The 1984 South African presidential election was the first to be held under the new South African Constitution of 1983, which abolished the office of Prime Minister and merged its powers into the position of State President, who was now both head of state and government. According to the new basic law, the State President was to be elected by an electoral college composed of members of the majority party in each of the chambers of the new tricameral parliament. As such, the electoral college was composed of 50 National Party members elected by the white House of Assembly, 25 Labor Party members from the Coloured House of Representatives, and 13 members of the National People's Party elected by the Indian House of Delegates.

The election came after the South African elections of 1984 to the two new legislative chambers in the South African Parliament: the House of Representatives, filled with representatives of the colored population in South Africa, and the House of Delegates, filled with representatives of the Indian population. The House of Assembly, the assembly representative of the white population last elected in 1981, was not reelected until 1987.

By unanimous vote of the members of the electoral college (88 votes), Pieter Willem Botha, outgoing Prime Minister and leader of the ruling National Party, was elected State President of South Africa, the first South African head of state to simultaneously be Head of Government. The inauguration of Botha's five-year term, marked by a ceremony in Parliament, took place in Cape Town on September 14, 1984.
