= 1989 South African presidential election =

- September 14, 1989

88 votes in the Electoral College 45 votes needed to win
- Turnout: 100%
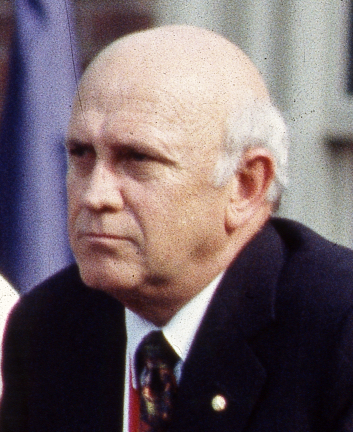
Nominee	F. W. de Klerk
Party	National
Electoral vote	88
Percentage	100%
- Results of the election. De Klerk received all 88 votes in the electoral college.
State President before election
F. W. de Klerk (acting)
National Party
Elected State President
F. W. de Klerk
National Party

The 1989 South African presidential election resulted in the election of Frederik Willem de Klerk as State President.

After the South African Constitution of 1983 came into force in 1984, the State President had been both Head of State and Head of Government, but also, in the tradition of the Westminster system, the leader of the most important party represented in the House of Assembly of Parliament. He was elected by an electoral college composed of members of the majority party in each chamber of the tricameral parliament following each legislative renewal.

The 1989 presidential election was the first and only one to be held following the simultaneous general election of the three chambers of parliament. On the basis of the dominant political parties in each of the three chambers, the electoral college was composed of 50 members of the then-ruling National Party elected by the House of Assembly (the white representative chamber), 25 representatives of the Labor Party elected by the House of Representatives (the colored representative chamber) and 13 members of the Solidarity Party elected by the House of Delegates (the Indian representative chamber).

Frederik Willem de Klerk, the leader of the National Party and the last State President of the Apartheid era, had been Acting State President since the resignation of P. W. Botha on August 15, 1989. The only candidate for the post of Head of State, he was elected unanimously by the electoral college on September 14 and sworn into office in Pretoria on September 20.
