= 1978 South African presidential election =

- 29 September 1978
- Turnout: 92.73%
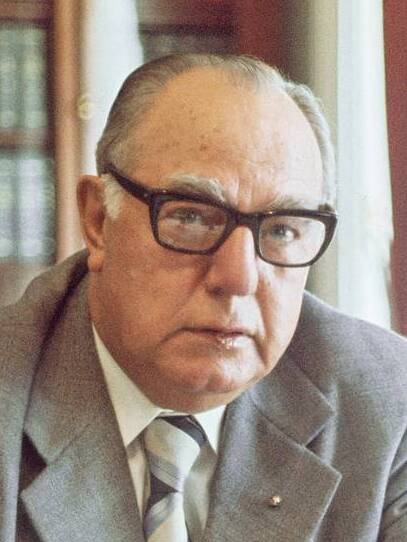

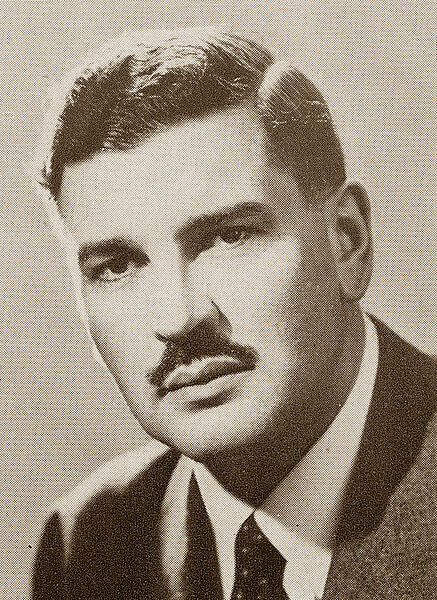

Nominee	B. J. Vorster	De Villiers Graaff	Guerino Bozzoli
Party	National	New Republic	Progressive
Electoral vote	173	19	12
Percentage	84.8%	9.31%	5.88%
- Results of the election. Vorster (orange) received 173 votes while Graaf received 19 and Bozzoli 12.
State President before election
Marais Viljoen (Acting)
National
Elected State President
B. J. Vorster
National

Following the death of State President Nicolaas Diederichs on August 21, 1978, a new election for the South African head of state was held which pitted former Prime Minister B. J. Vorster, backed by the then-ruling National Party, against former United Party leader De Villiers Graaff supported by the New Republic Party, and Vice-Chancellor of the University of the Witwatersrand, Guerino Bozzoli, supported by the Progressive Federal Party. In accordance with the South African Constitution of 1961, the ceremonial State President was elected by a joint sitting of both houses of Parliament for a seven-year term. John Vorster won the election with 173 votes in his favor and 31 going to the other candidates, beginning his term on October 10, 1978.
