= Decoration for Meritorious Services =

South African political service award

- Presented by: State President of South Africa
- Status: Replaced in 1986
- Final award: 1986

Highlights
- Total recipients: 109
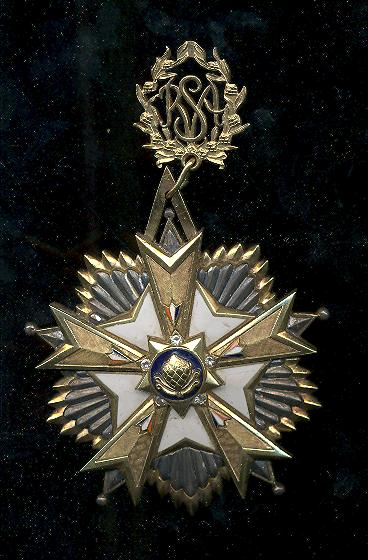
- DMS as presented to Casper Hendrik Rautenbach

The Decoration for Meritorious Services was an honour conferred until 1987 by the Government of the Republic of South Africa, usually for political services to the country. The appointments were made by the State President of South Africa.

== Postnominal letters ==
The conferral of this honour entitles the holder to the use of 'DMS' (or Afrikaans: DVD) after their name.

It was superseded by the Order for Meritorious Service in 1986.

Since 1 June 1994, this honour is classified as a Commonwealth honour.

== Design ==
A five-armed gold Maltese cross, displaying a golden protea flower on a blue roundel in the centre of a 5-pointed diamond-studded star, all superimposed on a multi-rayed silver and gold plaque (obverse). It is worn on a neck ribbon.

== Selected recipients ==
Name	Year	No
P. W. Botha		
Pik Botha		
Bettie Cilliers-Barnard	1983	No. 86
F. W. de Klerk		
Johannes de Klerk		
Nico Diederichs		
Jim Fouché		
Owen Horwood		
Gerhardus Petrus Jooste	1985	
Piet Koornhof		
Douglas Mitchell	1974	No. 8
Hilgard Muller	1976	No. 15
Ian Player		
Frans Lourens Herman Rumpff		
Casper Hendrik Rautenbach	1980	No.46
Charles Robberts Swart	1972	
Marais Viljoen		
