= Tini Vorster =

First lady of South Africa (1917–2000)

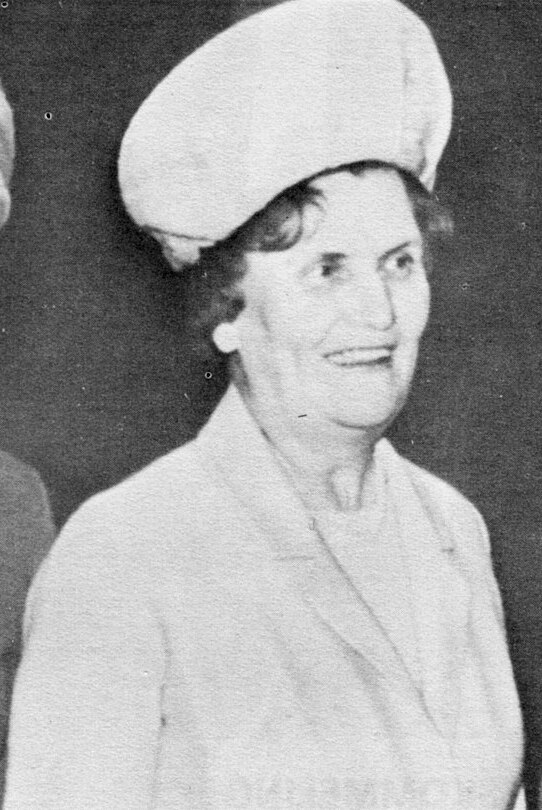
- Tini Vorster in 1968

First Lady of South Africa
- In office 10 October 1978 – 4 June 1979
- President: John Vorster
- Preceded by: Margaretha Jacoba Diederichs (née Potgieter)
- Succeeded by: Marietjie Viljoen

Personal details
- Born: Martini Steyn Malan; 21 August 1917 Worcester, Cape Province, Union of South Africa
- Died: 14 September 2000 (aged 83)
- Party: National Party (until 1997)
- Spouse: John Vorster (m. 1941)
- Children: 3
- Education: Stellenbosch University Potchefstroom University

Tini Vorster (née Malan; sometimes spelled Tienie Vorster; 21 August 1917 – 14 September 2000) was the wife of South Africa's Prime Minister and State President John Vorster.

Martini Steyn Malan was born in Worcester and married future Prime Minister and State President John Vorster in 1941. They had three children: a daughter Elsa, and two sons, Willem and Pieter. Pieter died of chickenpox at the age of 31.

Tini was South Africa's first registered female social worker. In 1978, she received an honorary doctorate from Potchefstroom University for her social service and research about Groote Schuur, the official Cape residence of South Africa's prime ministers between 1910 and 1984.

In 1990, she received the D.F. Malan medal from the Suid-Afrikaanse Akademie vir Wetenskap, Kuns en Kultuur (literally South African Academy for Science, Arts and Culture) for work of the highest quality in promoting Afrikaans culture. A British newspaper at the time wrote that if she had been born in a different era that she could have been prime minister herself.

Vorster was an honorary citizen of Kareedouw, the closest town to "Oubos" where she and her husband retired. In 1987, former State President P.W. Botha awarded her with the Order for Distinguished Service.

Tini died at a retirement home in the Strand on 14 September 2000, at the age of 83. She had been bedridden for six months prior to her death. Vorster was survived by her son Willem, daughter Elsa, ten grandchildren and five great-grandchildren.

The Afrikaans-medium primary school Tini Vorster in Nigel is named after her, while the Zanele Mbeki retirement home in Dunnottar was previously known as the "Tienie Vorster-tehuis".
