= 1983 South African constitutional referendum =

- 2 November 1983
- Are you in favour of the implementation of the Constitution Act, 1983, as approved by Parliament?

Results
Choice	Votes	%
Yes	1,360,223	66.29%
No	691,577	33.71%
Valid votes	2,051,800	99.48%
Invalid or blank votes	10,669	0.52%
Total votes	2,062,469	100.00%
Registered voters/turnout	2,713,000	76.02%
- Results by region

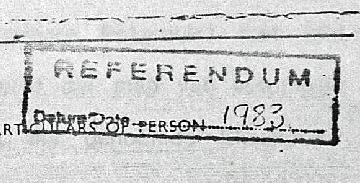
Stamp in identity document of a white South African recording their participation in the 1983 constitutional reform referendum

A referendum on a new constitution was held in South Africa on 2 November 1983 in which the white population was given the opportunity to approve or reject the Constitution of 1983. This constitution introduced the Tricameral Parliament, in which Coloured and Indian South Africans would be represented in separate parliamentary chambers, while black Africans, who were the majority of South Africa's population, would remain unrepresented. The referendum passed with 66.3% of voters voting "Yes"; consequently the new constitution came into force on 3 September 1984.

== Background ==
In 1981 the Senate was abolished and replaced with the President's Council, which was an advisory body consisting of sixty nominated members from the white, coloured, Indian and Chinese population groups. Following a request by Prime Minister P.W. Botha, the President's Council presented a set of proposals in 1982 for constitutional and political reform. This proposal called for the implementation of "power sharing" between the white, coloured and Indian communities.

The right wing of the ruling National Party (NP) rejected this proposal and a group of its MPs, led by Dr. Andries Treurnicht, a cabinet minister and the leader of the NP in the Transvaal province, broke away to form the Conservative Party (CP) in order to fight for a return to apartheid in its original form. However, Botha continued to be in favour of implementing the President's Council proposal and in 1983 the NP government introduced a new constitutional framework. A referendum was called for in order to determine public support for the reforms amongst white voters. The New Republic Party led by Vause Raw supported the new constitution, although it continued to call for black representation in Parliament.

== Opposition ==
Both the Progressive Federal Party (PFP), which objected to the exclusion of blacks, as well as the CP, which objected to the participation of coloureds and Indians, campaigned for a "No" vote. However, many PFP followers and parts of the anti-government English language press supported the new constitution as "a step in the right direction". The conservative opposition to the reforms used banners with the text "Rhodesia voted yes – vote no!" reflecting on the transformation to majority rule in Rhodesia.

The response of Coloured, Indian and black leaders were mixed. The new constitution was rejected by most Bantustan leaders and the Urban Councils Association of South Africa (representing the black township administrations) because it did not provide for black representation. Coloured and Indian parties that intended to participate in the Tricameral Parliament but also insisted on extending representation to the black majority.

The United Democratic Front (UDF) was launched as a non-racial coalition to oppose the referendum and the subsequent elections for the coloured and Indian chambers in parliament.

== Results ==
Are you in favour of the implementation of the Constitution Act, 1983, as approved by Parliament?
Is U ten gunste van die inwerkingtreding van die Grondwet, 1983, soos deur die Parlement goedgekeur?

Choice	Votes	%
For	1,360,223	66.29
Against	691,577	33.71
Total	2,051,800	100.00
Valid votes	2,051,800	99.48
Invalid/blank votes	10,669	0.52
Total votes	2,062,469	100.00
Registered voters/turnout	2,713,000	76.02
Source: Direct Democracy

=== By region ===
For counting purposes the provinces of South Africa were divided into various referendum areas. The following table shows the results in each area.

Area	Yes		No		Valid votes	Invalid votes	Total votes
Area	Votes	%	Votes	%	Valid votes	Invalid votes	Total votes
Cape
Beaufort West	22,502	74.42	7,733	25.58	30,235	93	30,328
Cape Town	221,511	75.61	71,456	24.39	292,967	1,229	294,196
East London	53,202	77.91	15,087	22.09	68,289	255	68,544
George	31,256	73.23	11,426	26.77	42,682	141	42,823
Kimberley	34,815	66.05	17,898	33.95	52,713	110	52,823
Port Elizabeth	60,661	70.08	25,901	29.92	86,562	208	86,770
Total	423,947	73.93	149,501	26.07	573,448	2,036	575,484
Natal
Durban	123,783	73.58	44,442	26.42	168,225	750	168,975
Pietermaritzburg	50,519	71.58	20,060	28.42	70,579	366	70,945
Total	174,302	72.99	64,502	27.01	238,804	1,116	239,920
Orange Free State
Bloemfontein	52,019	65.86	26,960	34.14	78,979	331	79,310
Kroonstad	55,486	63.19	32,321	36.81	87,807	189	87,996
Total	107,505	64.46	59,281	35.54	166,786	520	167,306
Transvaal
Germiston	113,600	65.35	60,241	34.65	173,841	900	174,741
Johannesburg	194,396	69.44	85,554	30.56	279,950	3,906	283,856
Pietersburg	31,403	47.42	34,827	52.58	66,230	247	66,477
Pretoria	209,763	57.13	157,433	42.87	367,196	1,035	368,231
Roodepoort	105,307	56.76	80,238	43.24	185,545	909	186,454
Total	654,469	61.01	418,293	38.99	1,072,762	6,997	1,079,759
South Africa
Total	1,360,223	66.29	691,577	33.71	2,051,800	10,669	2,062,469
