= 1975 South African presidential election =

- February 21, 1975

225 votes in the Parliament of South Africa 113 votes needed to win
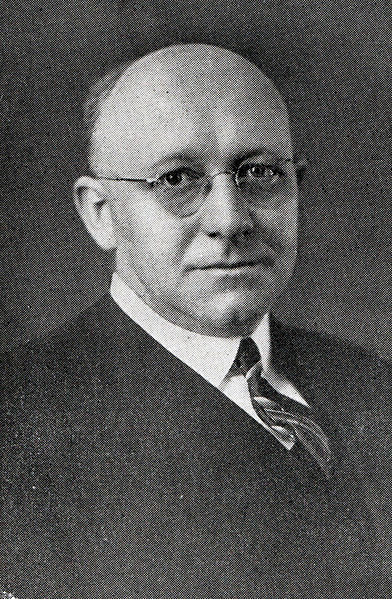
Nominee	Nicolaas Johannes Diederichs
Party	National
Electoral vote	225
Percentage	100%
State President before election
J. J. Fouché
National Party
Elected State President
Nicolaas Diederichs
National Party

The 1975 South African presidential election resulted in the unanimous election of Nicolaas Johannes Diederichs of the National Party by Parliament to the position of State President on February 21, 1975. Diedrichs was sworn in on April 19, 1975 during an official ceremony at the Groote Kerk (large church) of Cape Town.

Nicolaas Johannes Diederichs would die 3 years later after a short illness, of a heart attack on 21 August 1978 in Cape Town.
