= 1968 South African presidential election =

- February 19, 1968

223 votes in the Parliament of South Africa 112 votes needed to win
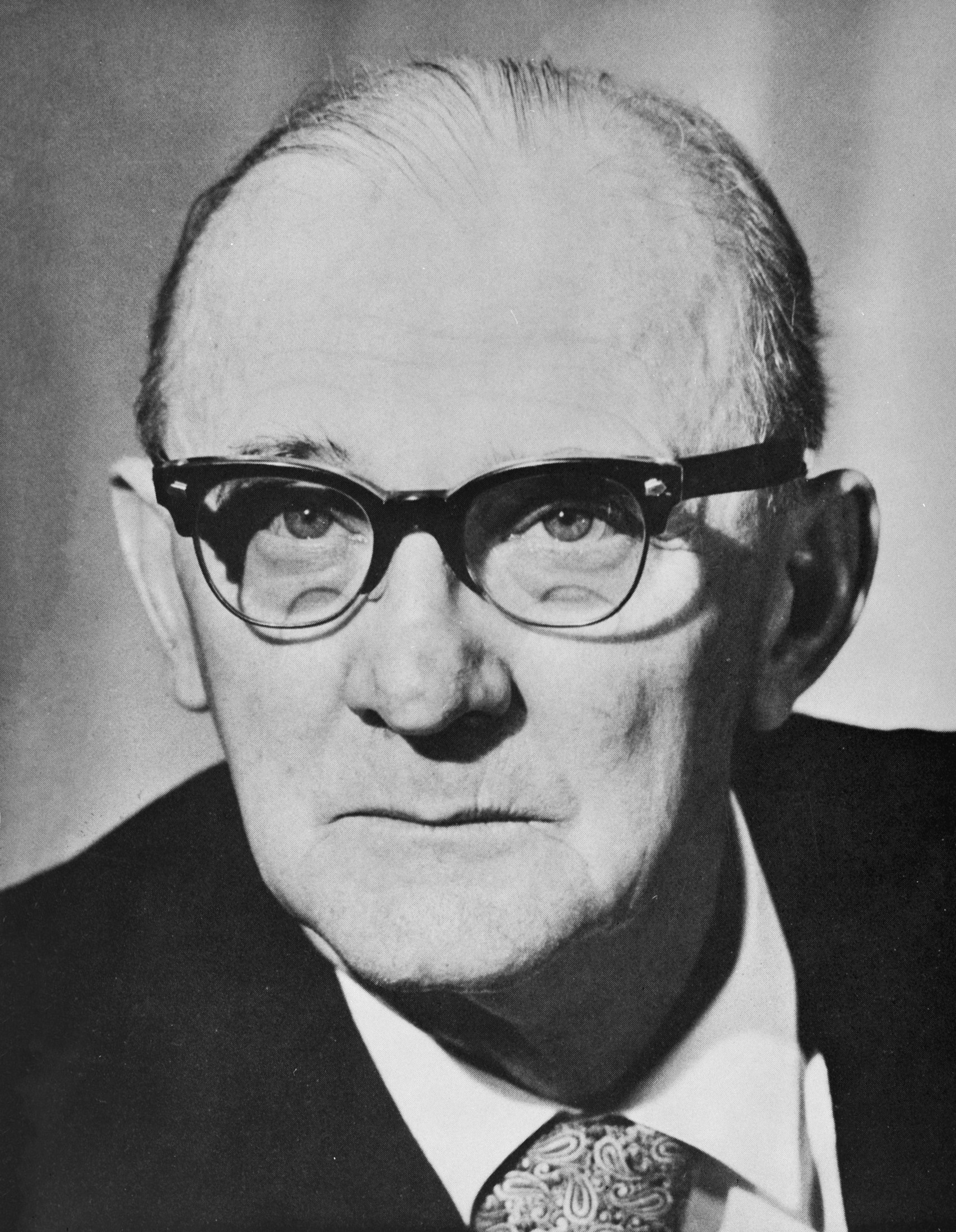
Nominee	J. J. Fouché
Party	National
Electoral vote	223
Percentage	100%
State President before election
Jozua Naudé (Acting)
National
Elected State President
J. J. Fouché
National

The 1968 South African presidential election resulted in the unanimous election of Jacobus Johannes Fouché of the National Party by the South African Parliament. Fouché was elected to the ceremonial post of State President of South Africa on February 19, 1968, and was sworn in on April 10, 1968. He was the only South African State President to serve a full seven-year term, which ended on 9 April 1975.
