= 1961 South African presidential election =

- May 10, 1961

217 votes in the Parliament of South Africa 109 votes needed to win
- Turnout: 96.77%
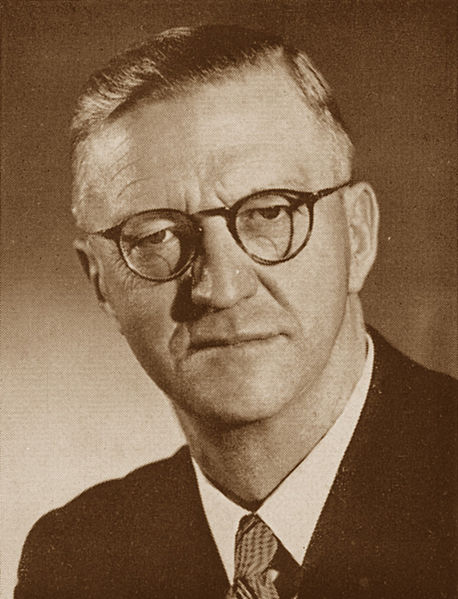

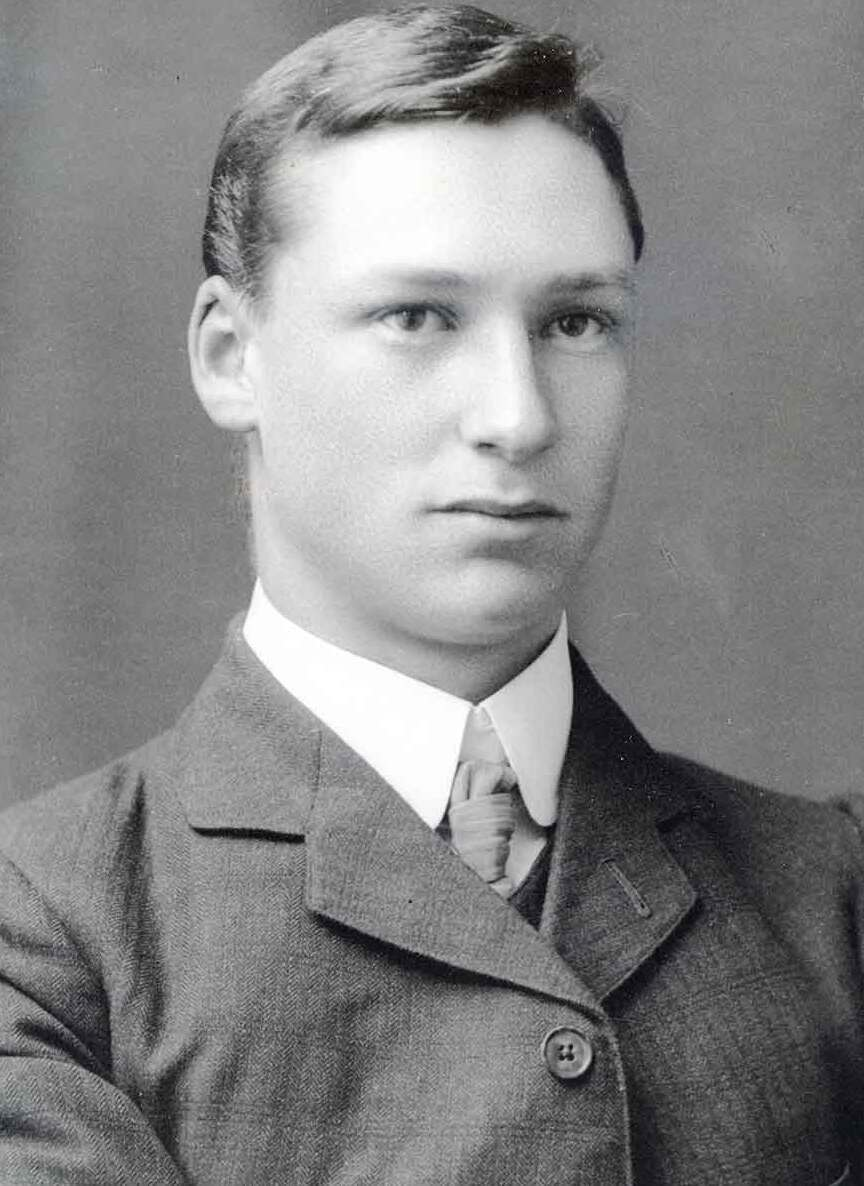
Nominee	C. R. Swart	Henry Fagan
Party	National	National Union
Electoral vote	139	71
Percentage	66.19%	33.81%
- Results of the election. Swart (orange) received 139 votes while Fagan (blue) received 71.
State President before election
Lucas Cornelius Steyn (As Officer Administrating the Government)
Elected State President
Charles Robberts Swart
National Party

The 1961 South African presidential election was the first to be held in South Africa. It occurred as a result of the referendum of November 5, 1960, which ratified the transformation of the Union of South Africa into the Republic of South Africa (1961–1984), and the adoption of a newconstitution organizing the new state's political institutions. The new constitution gave the South African Parliament the task of electing a person as State President, the position that replaced the British monarch as ceremonial head of state.

On April 30, 1961, Charles Robberts Swart, the last Governor-General of South Africa, presented his resignation to Queen Elizabeth II, who remained the Head of State of South Africa until May 31. On May 10, Swart was elected by a joint session of Parliament as State President of South Africa, winning 139 votes against the 71 won by Henry A. Fagan, the candidate of the National Union Party who was supported by the pro-Commonwealth United Party.

On 31 May, the day the Republic was proclaimed, Swart was sworn into his new position at an inauguration ceremony at the Groote Kerk (Afrikaans for "Great Church") in Pretoria before delivering his first speech as President on an official platform in front of the courthouse in front of thousands of people gathered on Church Square.
