= Eben Dönges =

South African politician (1898–1968)

Theophilus Ebenhaezer Dönges
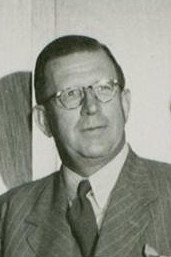
- Dönges in 1948

State President-elect of South Africa
- Preceded by: Charles Swart (as president)
- Succeeded by: Tom Naudé (acting); Jacobus Fouché

Acting Prime Minister of South Africa
- In office 6 September 1966 – 13 September 1966
- President: Charles Swart
- Preceded by: Hendrik Verwoerd
- Succeeded by: Balthazar Johannes Vorster

13th Minister of Finance
- In office 20 October 1958 – 24 February 1967
- Monarch: Elizabeth II (1958–1961)
- President: Charles Swart (1961–1967)
- Prime Minister: Hendrik Verwoerd; Balthazar Johannes Vorster
- Preceded by: Tom Naudé
- Succeeded by: Nicolaas Johannes Diederichs

12th Minister of the Interior
- In office 4 June 1948 – 20 October 1958
- Monarchs: George VI; Elizabeth II
- Prime Minister: Daniel Malan; Johannes Strijdom; Hendrik Verwoerd
- Preceded by: Harry Gordon Lawrence
- Succeeded by: Tom Naudé

Member of the House of Assembly for Worcester
- In office 1948 – 28 February 1967

Member of the House of Assembly for Fauresmith
- In office 1941–1948

Personal details
- Born: 8 March 1898 Klerksdorp, South African Republic
- Died: 10 January 1968 (aged 69) Cape Town, Cape Province, Republic of South Africa
- Party: National Party; Ossewabrandwag
- Spouse: Johanna Schoeman (1904–1993)
- Children: 2
- Education: University of Stellenbosch
- Occupation: Politician
- Cabinet: 1948–1967

Theophilus Ebenhaezer Dönges (8 March 1898 – 10 January 1968) was a South African politician who was elected the state president of South Africa, but died before he could take office, aged 69.

== Early life ==
Eben Dönges was born on 8 March 1898 in the town of Klerksdorp, the youngest son of Theophilus C. Dönges, a minister of religion. He attended Stellenbosch University and received a law degree from the University of London. He was admitted to the Middle Temple on 23 November 1921 and withdrew without being called to the bar on 8 November 1928. When he returned from London, he became active in the National Party and joined its mouthpiece, Die Burger, as a journalist. He left journalism in 1927 and practised law.

== Career ==
Dönges was a member of the Ossewabrandwag.

Running for parliament, he was unsuccessful in his first attempt in Hoopstad in 1938 before winning a by-election in Fauresmith in 1941. When the National Party won power in 1948, he joined the cabinet as Minister of Posts and Telegraphs. As Minister of the Interior, from 1948 to 1961, he was one of the so-called "architects" of apartheid, introducing race-based population registration, and removing Coloured voters from the common voters' roll as a prelude to disenfranchising them altogether. During his tenure as Minister of the Interior, Dönges believed that apartheid would continue only for the next two generations. In November 1953, after DF Malan resigned as Cape Provincial leader, Dönges defeated Eric Louw to become the new provincial leader.

In the 1958 National Party leadership election following the death of Prime Minister J. G. Strijdom, Dönges ran for the party leadership and lost to Hendrik Verwoerd in the final round of voting between the two candidates. Despite this, Verwoerd included Dönges in the new cabinet as Minister of Finance from 1958 to 1966. After Verwoerd's assassination, Dönges, as a senior member of the Cabinet, became acting Prime Minister on 6 September 1966 until a National Party congress named B. J. Vorster to succeed to the premiership.

Dönges was elected State President to succeed C.R. Swart on his retirement on 1 June 1967, but suffered a stroke and fell into a coma before he could take office. He died on 10 January 1968 without regaining consciousness. His deputy Tom Naudé acted for him until 6 December 1967 when he officially replaced Dönges.

== Legacy ==
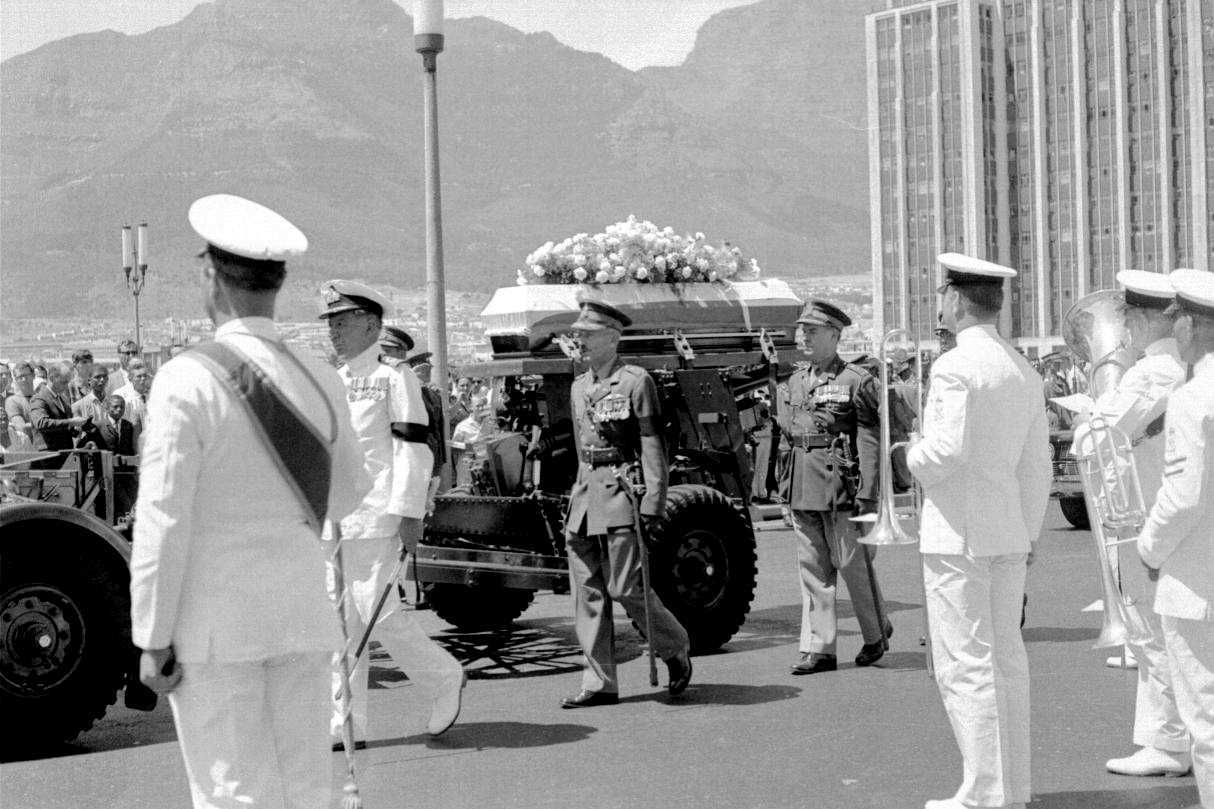
The State Funeral of Donges

He received the posthumous honours granted to a former State President: a state funeral and his effigy on the obverses of the 1969 silver 1 Rand coins. There is a school in Kraaifontein named after him, Eben Dönges High School and another primary school in Bothaville, Eben Dönges Primary School, as well as the Eben Dönges Hospital in Worcester.

Political offices
Preceded by Tom Naudé	Minister of Finance of South Africa; 1958–1967	Succeeded by Nicolaas Johannes Diederichs
Preceded by Harry Gordon Lawrence	Minister of the Interior of South Africa; 1948–1958	Succeeded by Tom Naudé
