= Tom Naudé =

South African politician (1889–1969)

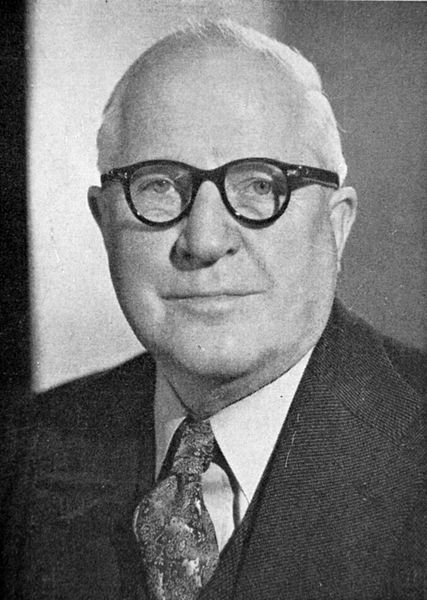
- Naudé c. 1962

State President of South Africa (acting)
- In office 1 June 1967 – 10 April 1968
- Prime Minister: Johannes Vorster
- Preceded by: Charles Robberts Swart
- Succeeded by: Jacobus Fouché

Minister of Finance
- In office 1956–1961
- Prime Minister: Hendrik Verwoerd

Minister of Health
- In office 1954–1956

Minister of Communications, Telecommunications and Postal Services of South Africa
- In office 1950–1954
- Preceded by: Erasmus, F.C.
- Succeeded by: Serfontein, J.

Personal details
- Born: Jozua François Naudé; 15 April 1889 Middelburg, Cape Colony
- Died: 31 May 1969 (aged 80) Cape Town, South Africa
- Party: National Party
- Spouse(s): Ada Brink (d.); Beatrice Gie (d.); Susara Durr
- Children: 5 children (Rey, Jozua, Danie, Louise and Andrè) 3 boys,2 girls

Jozua François "Tom" Naudé (15 April 1889 – 31 May 1969) was a South African politician who served as acting state president of South Africa from 1967 to 1968.

A National Party politician for many years, he served as Minister of Posts and Telegraphs from 1950 to 1954, as Minister of Health from 1954 to 1958, and as Minister of Finance from 1958 to 1961. He was then appointed President of the Senate of South Africa, and in terms of the South African Constitution of 1961 he would be required ex officio under a dormant commission to act as State President of South Africa whenever that office was vacant. He was unexpectedly called upon to do this when Dr Eben Dönges, who was elected to succeed C.R. Swart as State President in 1967, suffered a stroke and fell into a coma before he could be inaugurated. Naudé was Acting State President for ten months, until Dönges died and Jim Fouché was inaugurated in his place.

Tom Naudé Technical High School in Polokwane was named after him.

Political offices
Preceded by Charles Robberts Swart	State President of South Africa; 1967–1968	Succeeded by Jacobus Johannes Fouché
Preceded by Eric Louw	Finance Minister of South Africa; 1958–1961	Succeeded by Theophilus Donges
Preceded by Karl Bremer	Health Minister of South Africa; 1954–1956	Succeeded by J.H. Viljoen
