= State President of South Africa =

Head of state (1961–1994)

State President of the Republic of South Africa
- Staatspresident van die Republiek van Suid-Afrika
- The Standard of the ceremonial State President (1961–1984)

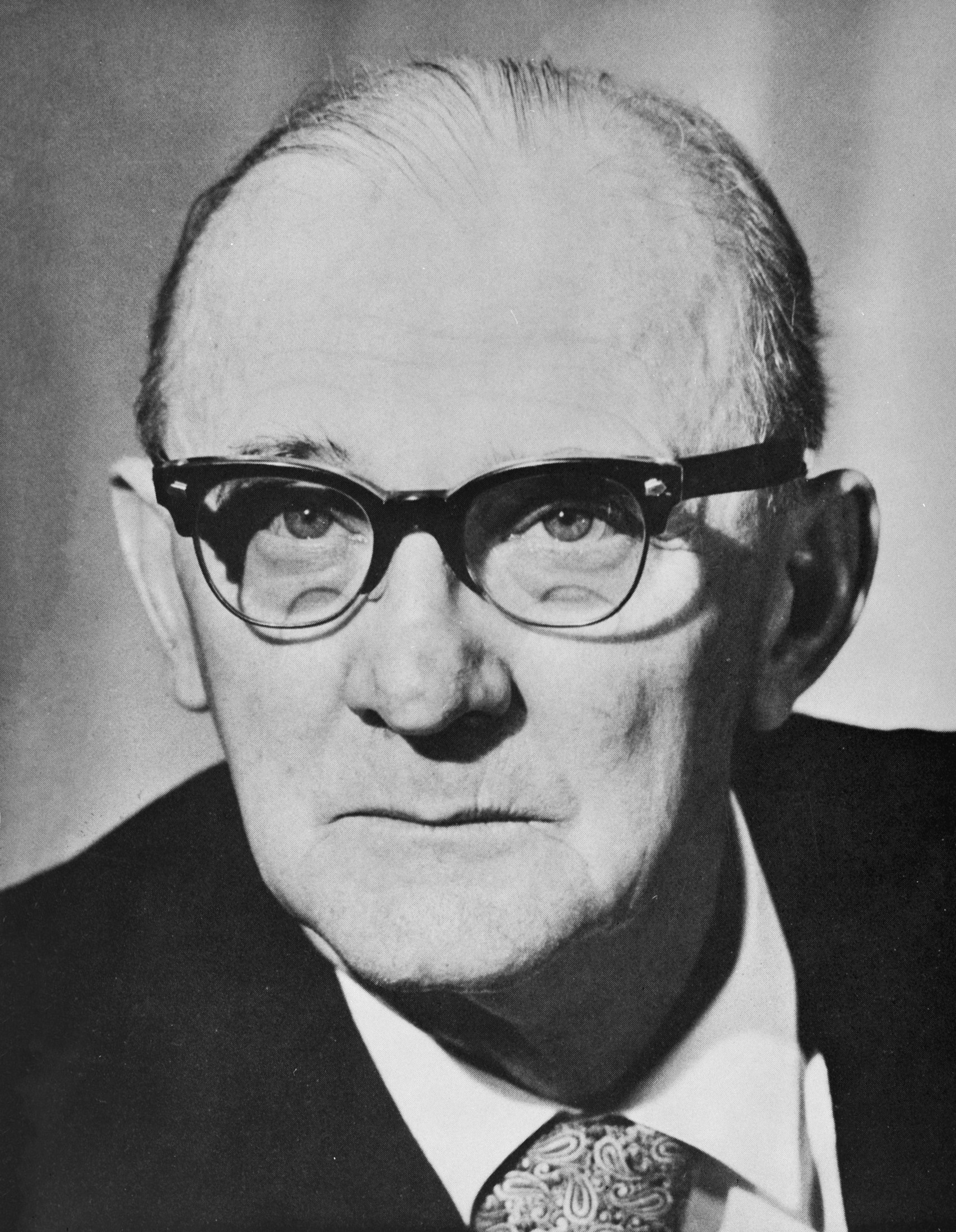
- Longest serving: J. J. Fouché; 10 April 1968 – 9 April 1975
- Style: The Honourable (until 1985)
- Abbreviation: SP – the same abbreviation in both English (State President) and Afrikaans (Staatspresident)
- Residence: Tuynhuys, Cape Town
- Appointer: Parliament of South Africa as an electoral college – House of Assembly of South Africa and the Senate of South Africa meeting jointly for this purpose.
- Term length: Seven years, nonrenewable (until 1984); Duration of Parliament (normally five years) (1984–1994)
- Precursor: Monarch of South Africa
- Formation: 31 May 1961 (ceremonial); 3 September 1984 (executive)
- First holder: C. R. Swart
- Final holder: F. W. de Klerk
- Abolished: 10 May 1994
- Succession: President of South Africa
- Deputy: Vice State President of South Africa (1981–1984)

The Standard of the executive State President (1984–1994)

The State President of the Republic of South Africa (Afrikaans: Staatspresident van die Republiek van Suid-Afrika) was the head of state of South Africa from 1961 to 1994, and also head of government from 1984 to 1994. The office was established when the country became a republic on 31 May 1961, outside the Commonwealth of Nations, and Queen Elizabeth II ceased to be Queen of South Africa. The position of Governor-General was accordingly abolished. From 1961 to 1984, the post was largely ceremonial. After constitutional reforms enacted in 1983 and taking effect in 1984, the State President became an executive post, and its holder was both head of state and head of government.

The State President was appointed by both Houses of the Parliament of South Africa (the Senate and House of Assembly) meeting jointly in the form of an electoral college for this purpose.

The office was abolished in 1994, with the end of Apartheid and the transition to democratic majority rule. Since then, the head of state and head of government has been known simply as the President of South Africa.

Prior to 1981, the President of the Senate had a dormant commission to act as State President whenever the State Presidency was vacant. This was often the case from 1967 to 1979.

== Ceremonial post ==
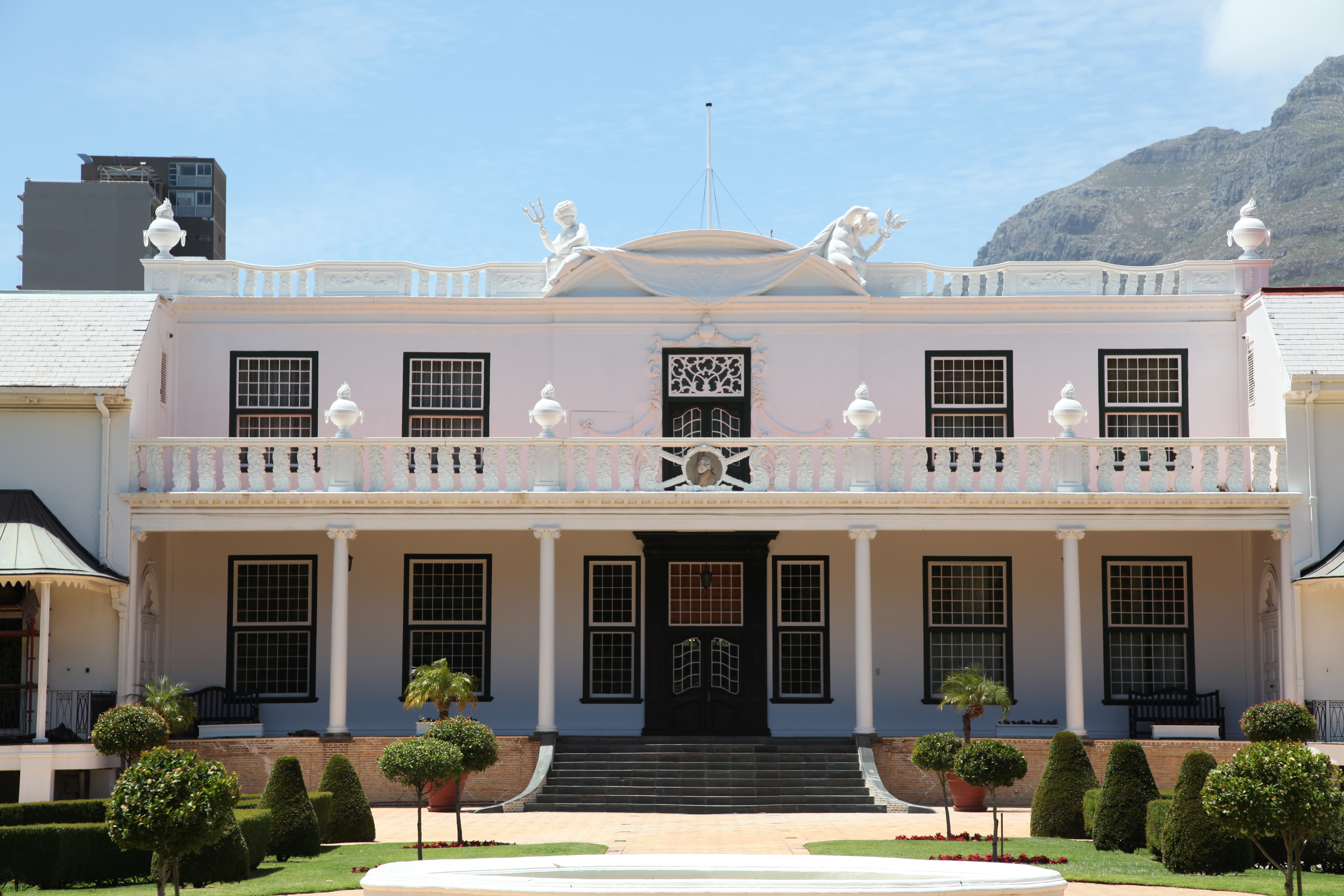
De Tuynhuys, used as the Cape Town office of the State President, now the office of the President of South Africa

Republicanism had long been a plank in the platform of the ruling National Party. However, it was not until 1960, 12 years after it took power, that it was able to hold a referendum on the issue. A narrow majority – 52 percent – of the minority white electorate voted in favour of abolishing the monarchy and declaring South Africa a republic.

The Republic of South Africa was proclaimed on 31 May 1961. Charles Robberts Swart, the last Governor-General, was sworn in as the first State President. The title 'State President' was originally used for the head of state of the Boer Republics, and like them, the holder of the office wore a sash with the Republic's coat of arms. He was elected to a seven-year term by Parliament, and was not eligible for re-election.

The National Party decided against having an executive presidency, instead adopting a minimalist approach as a conciliatory gesture to those in the English-speaking community who were opposed to a republic. Thus, like the Governor-General, the State President performed mostly ceremonial duties, and was bound by convention to act on the advice of the Prime Minister and the cabinet.

In practice, the post of State President was a sinecure for retired National Party ministers, as the Governor-General's post had been since 1948. Consequently, all State Presidents from 1961 to 1984 were white, Afrikaner, male, and over 60.

== Executive post ==
Following constitutional reforms, in 1984, the office of State President became an executive post, as in the United States. The Prime Minister's post was abolished, and its powers were de facto merged with those of the State President. He was elected by an electoral college of 88 members – 50 Whites, 25 Coloureds, and 13 Indians – from among the members of the Tricameral Parliament. The members of the electoral college were elected by the respective racial groups of the Tricameral Parliament – the white House of Assembly, Coloured House of Representatives and Indian House of Delegates. He held office for the Parliament's duration — in practice, five years. The last Prime Minister, P. W. Botha, was elected as the first executive State President. He succeeded the last ceremonial and non-executive State President, Marais Viljoen.

The State President was vested with sweeping executive powers – in most respects, even greater than those of comparative offices like the President of the United States. He had sole jurisdiction over matters of "national" concern, such as foreign policy and race relations. He was chairman of the President's Council, which resolved disputes between the three chambers regarding "general affairs" legislation. This body consisted of 60 members – 20 members appointed by the House of Assembly, 10 by the House of Representatives, five by the House of Delegates and 25 directly by the State President.

Although the reforms were billed as a power-sharing arrangement, the composition of the electoral college and President's Council made it all but impossible for the white chamber to be outvoted on any substantive matter. Thus, the real power remained in white hands – and in practice, in the hands of the National Party, which had a large majority in the white chamber. As Botha was leader of the National Party, the system placed nearly all governing power in his hands.

Botha resigned in 1989 and was succeeded by F. W. de Klerk, who oversaw the transition to majority rule in 1994.

== End of white minority rule ==
Under South Africa's first non-racial constitution, adopted in 1994, the head of state (and of government) is known simply as the President. However, since the declaration of the republic in 1961, most non-South African sources had referred to the State President as simply the "President". The leader of the African National Congress, Nelson Mandela, was sworn in as President of South Africa on 10 May 1994.

== List of state presidents of South Africa ==
Political parties

National Party

Symbols

and "acting" denotes acting president

| No. | Portrait | Name (Birth–Death) | Term of office | | | Political party | Elected |
| No. | Portrait | Name (Birth–Death) | Took office | Left office | Time in office | Political party | Elected |
State presidents as head of state (Ceremonial, 1961–1984)
| 1 | | C. R. Swart (1894–1982) | 31 May 1961 | 31 May 1967 | 6 years | National Party | 1961 |
| — | | Eben Dönges (1898–1968) | Elected, but did not take office because of illness | | | National Party | 1967 |
| — | | Tom Naudé (1889–1969) acting | 1 June 1967 | 10 April 1968 | 314 days | National Party | — |
| 2 | | J.J. Fouché (1898–1980) | 10 April 1968 | 9 April 1975 | 6 years, 364 days | National Party | 1968 |
| — | | Jan de Klerk (1903–1979) acting | 9 April 1975 | 19 April 1975 | 10 days | National Party | — |
| 3 | | Nico Diederichs (1903–1978) | 19 April 1975 | 21 August 1978 (died in office) | 3 years, 124 days | National Party | 1975 |
| — | | Marais Viljoen (1915–2007) acting | 21 August 1978 | 10 October 1978 | 50 days | National Party | — |
| 4 | | B. J. Vorster (1915–1983) | 10 October 1978 | 4 June 1979 (resigned) | 237 days | National Party | 1978 |
| — | | Marais Viljoen (1915–2007) | 4 June 1979 | 19 June 1979 | 15 days | National Party | – |
| 5 | | Marais Viljoen (1915–2007) | 19 June 1979 | 3 September 1984 | 5 years, 91 days | National Party | 1979 |
State presidents as head of state and government (Executive, 1984–1994)
| — | | P. W. Botha (1916–2006) | 3 September 1984 | 14 September 1984 | 11 days | National Party | – |
| 6 | | P. W. Botha (1916–2006) | 14 September 1984 | 19 January 1989 | 4 years, 127 days | National Party | 1984 |
| — | | Chris Heunis (1927–2006) acting | 19 January 1989 | 15 March 1989 | 55 days | National Party | – |
| (6) | | P. W. Botha (1916–2006) | 15 March 1989 | 14 August 1989 (resigned) | 152 days | National Party | – |
| — | | F. W. de Klerk (1936–2021) | 14 August 1989 | 20 September 1989 | 37 days | National Party | – |
| 7 | | F. W. de Klerk (1936–2021) | 20 September 1989 | 10 May 1994 | 4 years, 232 days | National Party | 1989 |

== See also ==
- State President of the South African Republic
- State President of the Orange Free State
- Governor-General of the Union of South Africa
- President of South Africa
- Prime Minister of South Africa
- Vice State President of South Africa
