= South African Constitution of 1983 =

Fundamental law of South Africa from 1984 to 1994

Republic of South Africa Constitution Act, 1983

Parliament of South Africa
- Long title: Act to introduce a new constitution for the Republic of South Africa and to provide for matters incidental thereto.
- Citation: Act No. 110 of 1983
- Enacted by: Parliament of South Africa
- Assented to: 22 September 1983
- Commenced: 3 September 1984
- Repealed: 27 April 1994

Repeals
- Republic of South Africa Constitution Act, 1961

Repealed by
- Constitution of the Republic of South Africa, 1993
- Status: Repealed

The Constitution of 1983 (formally the Republic of South Africa Constitution Act, 1983) was South Africa's third constitution. It replaced the republican constitution that had been adopted when South Africa became a republic in 1961 and was in force for ten years before it was superseded by the Interim Constitution on 27 April 1994, which in turn led to the current Constitution of South Africa, which has been in force since 1997.

== Background ==
The creation of the 1983 constitution was spearheaded by then-Prime Minister P.W. Botha. It was approved by white voters in a referendum on 2 November 1983, in which 66.3% of ballots cast were in favour of the new constitution.

== Provisions ==
Among the 1983 constitution's most controversial provisions was its establishment of the Tricameral Parliament, a legislative arrangement that would permit the Coloured and Indian race groups to be represented in parliament on a segregated basis, and the abolition of the office of Prime Minister in favour of an executive State Presidency under ruling Prime Minister P. W. Botha. The act also officially removed any mention of Dutch as an official language.

== Opposition ==
=== Bill of Rights proposal ===
The constitutions saw significant opposition from the anti-apartheid Progressive Federal Party. While opposing the utility of white rule, the PFP attempted to incorporate a 'Bill of Rights' into the new constitution proposed by the National Party. The motion was first submitted in August 1983, by Shadow Finance Minister Harry Schwarz. He stated that the Bill should guarantee freedom from discrimination on the ground of race, colour, sex or creed, freedom of conscience and religion, of thought, belief, opinion and expression, including freedom of the press, of association, peaceful assembly and movement, and freedom to pursue the gaining of a livelihood. It also included freedom from deprivation of life, liberty, security and property, except in accordance with the principles of fundamental justice. It would also guarantee equality before the law and equal protection and benefit of law.

Schwarz argued that if included in the constitution of the republic, it would act as a “protector of rights many people had struggled to achieve in South Africa” as well as to “act as an inspiration” to the people of South Africa and would “be a unifying factor in a country in which unity of people is essential for survival”. Helen Suzman, Shadow Law and Order Minister, argued that the exclusion of the bill would lead to "a further loss of civil liberties by all South Africans - in short, to one-party, one-group dictatorship in this country". It was also argued that the bill would be a statement of intent demonstrating that the days of discrimination on the grounds of race or colour had come to an end.

While virtually all MPs of the Progressive Federal Party supported the bill, no other party in Parliament supported it. Rejecting Schwarz’s proposal, Daan van der Merwe of the Conservative Party stated that the bill, based on a “leftist-liberal political philosophy”, would jeopardise the freedom of the white man. New Republic Party leader Vause Raw said Schwarz “a master at platitudes” was seeking idealistic freedoms that did not exist anywhere in the world. Following the rejection of Schwarz’s bill, fellow PFP MPs' Helen Suzman, Colin Eglin, Ray Swart and Dave Dalling attempted a further four times to introduce a Bill of Rights. The Bills were effectively blocked by the National Party by placing them at the end of the order paper.

== See also ==
- P.W. Botha
