= John Vorster =

South African politician (1915–1983)

B. J. Vorster DMS
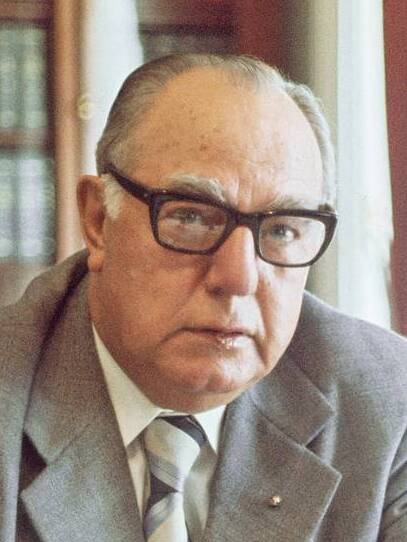

4th State President of South Africa
- In office 10 October 1978 – 4 June 1979
- Prime Minister: Pieter Willem Botha
- Preceded by: Nicolaas Diederichs; Marais Viljoen (acting)
- Succeeded by: Marais Viljoen

7th Prime Minister of South Africa
- In office 13 September 1966 – 2 October 1978
- President: Charles R. Swart; Jozua Naudé (acting); Jacobus Fouché; Jan de Klerk (acting); Nicolaas Diederichs; Marais Viljoen (acting)
- Preceded by: Hendrik Verwoerd; Eben Dönges (acting)
- Succeeded by: Pieter Willem Botha

Minister of Police
- In office 1 April 1966 – 9 August 1968
- Prime Minister: Hendrik Verwoerd| Himself
- Preceded by: Office established Himself (as Minister of Justice)
- Succeeded by: Lourens Muller

Minister of Justice
- In office 8 October 1961 – 14 September 1966
- Prime Minister: Hendrik Verwoerd
- Preceded by: Frans Erasmus
- Succeeded by: Petrus Cornelius Pelser

Personal details
- Born: Balthazar Johannes Vorster; 13 December 1915 Jamestown, Cape Province, Union of South Africa
- Died: 10 September 1983 (aged 67) Cape Town, Cape Province, South Africa
- Party: National
- Spouse: Tini Vorster (m. 1941)
- Children: Elizabeth (Elsa) Vorster; Willem Carel Vorster; Pieter Andries Vorster
- Education: University of Stellenbosch

Balthazar Johannes Vorster (Afrikaans pronunciation: [ˈbaltɑːzar juəˈhanəs ˈfɔrstər]; 13 December 1915 – 10 September 1983) was a South African politician who served as the Prime Minister of South Africa from 1966 to 1978 and the fourth State President of South Africa from 1978 to 1979. Known as B. J. Vorster during much of his career, he came to prefer the anglicized name John in the 1970s. He was interned in 1942 by the South African government for his involvement in the pro-Nazi Ossewabrandwag, but Vorster denied this and said the official reason given to him was for being "anti-British".

Vorster strongly adhered to his country's policy of apartheid, overseeing (as Minister of Justice) the Rivonia Trial, in which Nelson Mandela was sentenced to life imprisonment for sabotage, (as Prime Minister) the Terrorism Act, the complete abolition of non-white political representation, the Soweto Riots and the Steve Biko crisis. He conducted a more pragmatic foreign policy than his predecessors, in an effort to improve relations between the white minority government and South Africa's neighbours, particularly after the break-up of the Portuguese colonial empire. Shortly after the 1978 Internal Settlement in Rhodesia, in which he was instrumental, he was implicated in the Muldergate Scandal. He resigned the premiership in favour of the ceremonial state presidency, from which he was forced out as well eight months later.

== Early life ==
Vorster was born in 1915 in Jamestown, Cape Province, Union of South Africa, the fifteenth child of a successful sheep farmer, Willem Carel Vorster and his wife, Elizabeth Sophia Vorster (née Wagenaar). He attended primary school there. After Vorster entered Stellenbosch University, he involved himself in student politics becoming the chairman of the debating society, deputy chairman of the student council and leader of the junior National Party.

In 1938, Vorster graduated to become a registrar (judge's clerk) to the judge president of the Cape Provincial Division of the Supreme Court of South Africa but he did not remain in this post for long, setting up his first law practice in Port Elizabeth and his second in the Witwatersrand town of Brakpan.

== Career ==
=== Ossewabrandwag ===
From 1939, Vorster attracted attention by strongly opposing South Africa's intervention on the side of the Allies and its former foe the United Kingdom, in World War II.

Vorster dedicated himself to an anti-British, pro-Nazi organisation called the Ossewabrandwag (Ox-wagon Sentinel), founded in 1938 in celebration of the centenary of the Great Trek. Under the leadership of Johannes Van Rensburg, the Ossewabrandwag conducted many acts of sabotage against South Africa during World War II to limit its war effort. Vorster, who was interned for his activities, which included helping previously interned fugitives, claimed not to have participated in the acts of war attributed to the group. He described himself as anti-British, not pro-Nazi, and said his internment was for anti-British agitation.

Vorster rose rapidly through the ranks of the Ossewabrandwag becoming a general in its paramilitary wing. In 1942, he said: "We stand for Christian nationalism which is an ally of National Socialism. You can call this anti-democratic principle dictatorship if you wish. In Italy it is called 'Fascism', in Germany 'German National Socialism and in South Africa 'Christian nationalism'."

His involvement with this group led to his detention at Koffiefontein in 1942. Following his release from custody in 1944, Vorster became active in the National Party, which began implementing the policy of apartheid in 1948. Although racial discrimination in favour of whites had long been a crucial fact of South African politics and society, formal restrictions were loosening and the National Party institutionalised racism in a new way and on a massive scale through its "apartheid" legislation.

=== House of Assembly ===
After initially losing a race for the constituency of Brakpan by two votes in 1948, Vorster was elected to the House of Assembly representing the seat of Nigel in the Transvaal in 1953. Having run under the Afrikaner Party banner in 1948, Vorster joined the National Party in 1951. He was appointed as Deputy Minister of Education, Arts, and Science as well as Deputy Minister of Social Welfare and Pensions in 1958. He was an MP during the terms of prime ministers D.F. Malan, J.G. Strijdom and Hendrik Verwoerd. Vorster's wartime anti-British activities came back to haunt him. Vorster answered his critics by saying that he had now "come to believe in" the parliamentary system.

A leader of the right wing of the National Party, he was appointed Minister of Justice in 1961 by prime minister Verwoerd, an outspoken mentor and idol of Vorster. He combined that with the Minister of Police and Prisons in 1966.

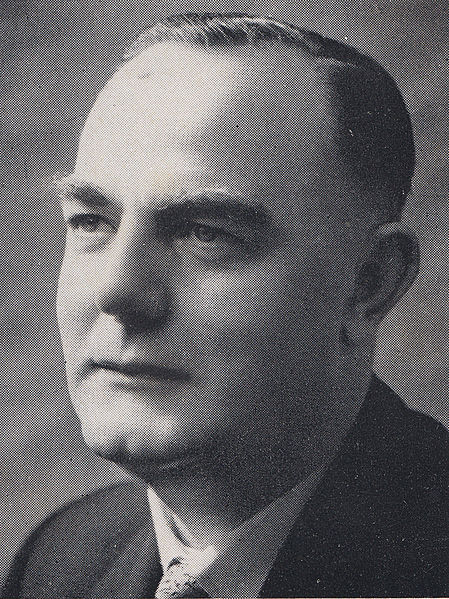
Vorster in 1960.

Upon Verwoerd's assassination in 1966, Vorster was elected by the National Party to succeed him, and continued Verwoerd's implementation of apartheid legislation, including the 1968 abolition of the last four parliamentary seats that had been reserved for white representatives of Coloured (mixed race) voters (realised in 1970). Despite this, Vorster's rule oversaw several other such proposed bills dropped, as well the repealing of legislation prohibiting multi-racial sports teams in order to allow for South Africa to compete at the 1968 Summer Olympics in Mexico. Despite Vorster's efforts, protests by numerous African nations meant that the IOC refused permission for South Africa's proposed team to compete.

As a personal figure, Vorster was described as "flesh and blood" by Progressive MP Helen Suzman in contrast to the "diabolical" and "frightening" Verwoerd. His supporters held him in great affection for his eccentricities. Examples of this were the occasion when he briefed the opposition in his private chambers, his allowing pictures of himself to be taken in often precarious situations and then to be distributed publicly as well as his welcoming of foreigners, in his words, to "the happiest police state in the world". This new outlook in the leadership of South Africa was dubbed "billikheid" or "sweet reasonableness". He alienated an extremist faction of his National Party when it accepted the presence of Māori players and spectators during the tour of the New Zealand national rugby union team in South Africa in 1970.

Vorster was more pragmatic than his predecessors when it came to foreign policy. He improved relations with other African nations, such as by the adoption of his policy of letting Black African diplomats live in white areas in South Africa. He unofficially supported, but refused officially to recognise, the neighbouring state of Rhodesia, whose predominantly white minority government had unilaterally declared independence (UDI) from the UK in 1965. Vorster followed white public opinion in South Africa by supporting Rhodesia publicly, but was unwilling to alienate important political allies in the United States by extending diplomatic recognition to Rhodesia.

The collapse of Portuguese rule in Angola and Mozambique in 1975 left South Africa and Rhodesia as the sole outposts of white minority rule on the continent: while Vorster was unwilling to make any concessions to his country's majority population, he soon realised that white rule would be untenable in a country where blacks outnumbered whites.

In September 1976, under pressure from US Secretary of State Henry Kissinger, he pressured Ian Smith, the Rhodesian Prime Minister, to accept in principle that white minority rule could not continue indefinitely. Smith and moderate black nationalist leaders signed the Internal Settlement in March 1978, and in June 1979, following multiracial elections, Rhodesia was reconstituted under black majority rule as Zimbabwe Rhodesia which, in this form, also lacked any international recognition.

=== Information Scandal ===
After the Soweto Uprising in 1976, as prime minister, Vorster encouraged the Department of Information to engage in clandestine activities in and outside South Africa. Vorster did not inform his cabinet of these activities and financed them through a secret defence account. When the auditor general made a critical report, a scandal broke out, ultimately leading to the resignation of Vorster. This scandal was colloquially known to some as "South African Watergate".

=== State President and retirement ===
Vorster resigned as prime minister in 1978, after twelve years in office. He was succeeded by P. W. Botha, a hardliner who nevertheless began the first reforms to moderate the apartheid system. Following his resignation as prime minister, Vorster was elected to the largely honorary position of State President. His tenure in his new office, however, was short-lived. In what came to be known as the Muldergate Scandal so named after Dr Connie Mulder, the Cabinet minister at its centre, Vorster was implicated in the use of a secret slush fund to establish The Citizen, the only major English-language newspaper that was favourable to the National Party. A commission of inquiry concluded in mid-1979 that Vorster "knew everything" about the corruption and had tolerated it. He resigned from the state presidency in disgrace. In 1982, John Vorster supported the Conservative Party of Andries Treurnicht at its founding congress. He died in September 1983, aged 67 years, from complications of a lung infection and emphysema, which resulted in a fatal blood clot in his lung.

=== Legacy under apartheid ===
Using the Group Areas Act, Stellenbosch University dispossessed coloured residents of central Stellenbosch of their land in order to expand the university. They named the building built there after B.J. Vorster, an alumnus and chancellor of the university. It was renamed in the 1990s.

Johannesburg Central Police Station was formerly called John Vorster Square, and was the home of South Africa's Special Branch during the apartheid era.

A popular anecdote about Vorster comes from Cricketer Don Bradman's visit to South Africa in June 1971 to discuss the South African Cricket team's tour to Australia later that year. The conversation was as follows :

- Bradman: "why don't you choose blacks in the team? I want to know".
- Vorster: "blacks understand rugby but they don't understand the intricacies of cricket. [They] can't handle it".
- Bradman: "have you heard of Garry Sobers?"

== Publication ==
- Vorster, Balthazar Johannes (1976). O. Geyser (ed.). Geredigeerde toesprake van die sewende Eerste Minister van Suid-Afrika: 1953-1974 [The edited speeches of the seventh prime minister of South Africa: 1953-1974] (in Afrikaans). Bloemfontein: Instituut vir Eietydse Geskiedenis, UOVS. ISBN 9780868860053.

Political offices
| Preceded by Hendrik Verwoerd | Prime Minister of South Africa; 1966–1978 | Succeeded by P. W. Botha |
| Preceded by Marais Viljoen | State President of South Africa; 1978–1979 | Succeeded by Marais Viljoen |
