= Marais Viljoen =

President of South Africa from 1979 to 1984

Marais Viljoen DMS
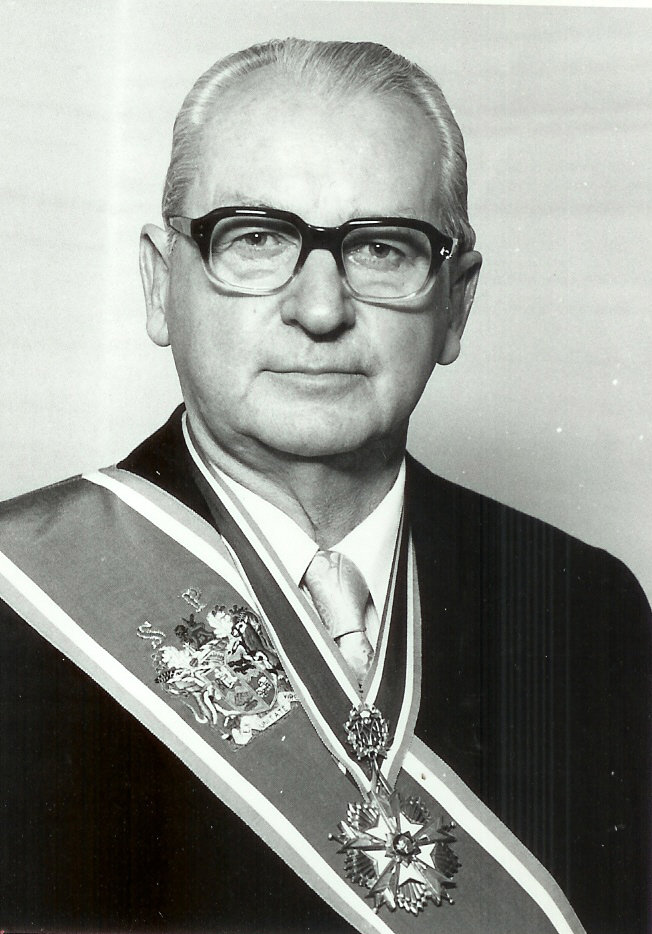
- Viljoen in 1979

5th State President of South Africa
- In office 4 June 1979 – 3 September 1984
- Prime Minister: Pieter Willem Botha
- Vice President: Alwyn Schlebusch (1982–1984)
- Preceded by: Johannes Vorster
- Succeeded by: Pieter Willem Botha
- In office 21 August 1978 – 10 October 1978; Acting
- Prime Minister: B. J. Vorster; P.W. Botha
- Preceded by: Nicolaas Diederichs
- Succeeded by: Johannes Vorster

President of the Senate
- In office 22 January 1976 – 19 June 1979
- Preceded by: Johannes de Klerk
- Succeeded by: Jimmy Kruger

Personal details
- Born: 2 December 1915 Robertson, Cape Province, Union of South Africa
- Died: 4 January 2007 (aged 91) Pretoria, Gauteng, South Africa
- Party: National Party; Ossewabrandwag (affiliated)
- Spouse: Dorothea Maria Brink (m. 1940; died 2005)
- Children: Elizabeth Magdalena
- Education: University of Cape Town

Marais Viljoen, DMS (2 December 1915 – 4 January 2007) was a South African politician who served as the last ceremonial State President of South Africa from 4 June 1979 until 3 September 1984. Viljoen became the last of the ceremonial presidents of South Africa when he was succeeded in 1984 by Prime Minister P. W. Botha, who combined the offices into an executive state presidency.

== Early life ==
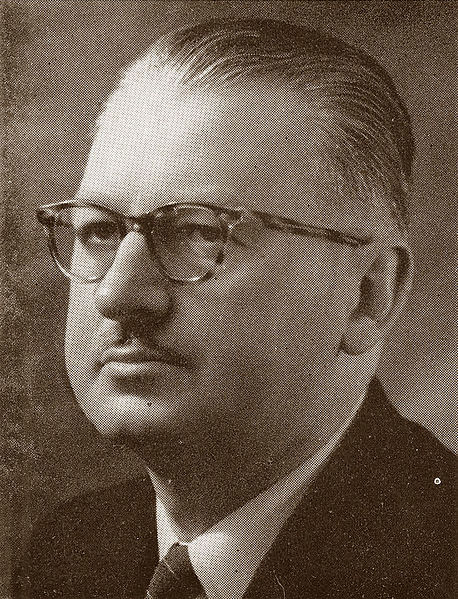
Viljoen in 1960.

Viljoen was the youngest of six children of Magdalena Debora "Lenie" (de Villiers) and Gabriel Francois Viljoen. He was married on 20 April 1940 to Dorothea Maria Brink (17 September 1917 – 5 October 2005), with whom he had one daughter Elizabeth Magdalena (Elna) Viljoen.

After finishing school at Jan van Riebeeck High School in Cape Town, he went to work in the Post Office, and thereafter at the Afrikaans language newspaper, Die Transvaler, edited by Hendrik Verwoerd, who later became prime minister.

== Early political career ==
Viljoen was elected to the House of Assembly as MP for Alberton, near Johannesburg, as President of the Senate, and as acting State President from 21 August 1978 to 10 October 1978, when B.J. Vorster was briefly elected to the position. Viljoen was seen as a relatively-moderate member of the National Party, which instituted apartheid.

== State Presidency ==
After Vorster's resignation as a result of the Muldergate Scandal in 1979, Viljoen held the post of non-executive State President from 4 June 1979 until 3 September 1984. The State Presidency during this time was a ceremonial post, like that of the Governor-General, which it replaced in 1961.

Under the 1983 Constitution, the last under apartheid, the position of the State President was changed to a more powerful executive position. Viljoen retired and was replaced by P. W. Botha, who until 1984 had been the executive Prime Minister. After Viljoen had retired from public life, he continued to maintain an interest in politics.

== Depiction on a coin ==
He is depicted on the obverse of the 1985 1 Rand coin.

== Legacy ==
Hoërskool Marais Viljoen which was opened by Viljoen in 1961 ,while he served as MP for Alberton, is named after him.

== Death ==
Viljoen died on 4 January 2007 of heart failure. He received a state funeral on 13 January 2007.

== Ancestry ==
Ancestors of Marais Viljoen

8. Hendrik Christoffel Viljoen
4. Petrus Jacobus Viljoen
9. Elisabet Johanna du Toit
2. Gabriel Francois Viljoen
10. Johannes Jacobus Wentzel
5. Anna Susanna Johanna Wentzel
11. Anna Margaretha Maree
1. Marais Viljoen
12. Petrus Johannes de Villiers
6. Johannes Hendrikus de Villiers
13. Magdalena Debora Retief
3. Magdalena Debora de Villiers
14. Daniel Johannes Marais
7. Hester Debora Francina Marais
15. Johanna Maria Siebrits

Political offices
Preceded by Nicolaas Johannes Diederichs	Acting State President of South Africa; 1978	Succeeded by Balthazar Johannes Vorster
Preceded by Balthazar Johannes Vorster	State President of South Africa; 1979–1984	Succeeded by Pieter Willem Botha
