= C. R. Swart =

South African politician (1894–1982)

The Honourable C.R. Swart DMS
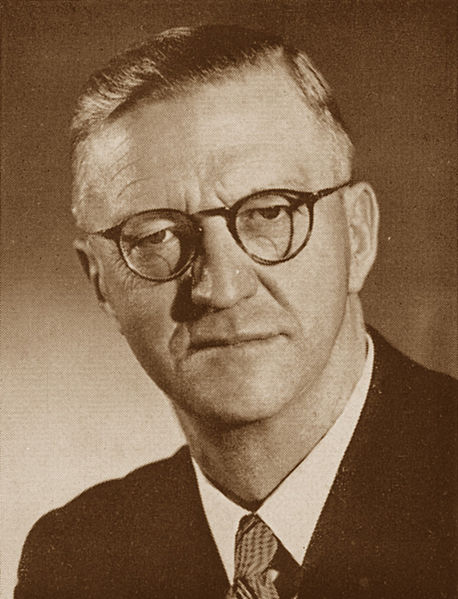
- Official portrait, 1960

1st State President of South Africa
- In office 31 May 1961 – 1 June 1967
- Prime Minister: Hendrik Verwoerd; Johannes Vorster
- Preceded by: Elizabeth II (as Queen of South Africa); Himself (as Governor-General)
- Succeeded by: Tom Naudé (acting); Jacobus Fouché

9th Governor-General of South Africa
- In office 11 December 1959 – 31 May 1961
- Monarch: Elizabeth II
- Prime Minister: Johannes Strijdom
- Preceded by: Ernest George Jansen; Lucas Cornelius Steyn (acting)
- Succeeded by: Position Abolished

Minister of Justice
- In office 4 June 1948 – 11 December 1959
- Prime Minister: Daniël Malan; Johannes Strijdom
- Preceded by: Harry Lawrence
- Succeeded by: Frans Erasmus

Minister of Education, Arts and Science
- In office 1949–1950
- Prime Minister: Daniël Malan
- Preceded by: Albert Jacobus Stals
- Succeeded by: Johannes Hendrikus Viljoen

Personal details
- Born: 5 December 1894 Winburg, Orange Free State
- Died: 16 July 1982 (aged 87) Bloemfontein, Orange Free State Province, South Africa
- Party: National Party; Ossewabrandwag
- Spouse: Cornelia de Klerk (m. 1924)
- Children: 3
- Education: University of the Free State; Columbia University
- Occupation: Politician; lawyer; journalist; actor
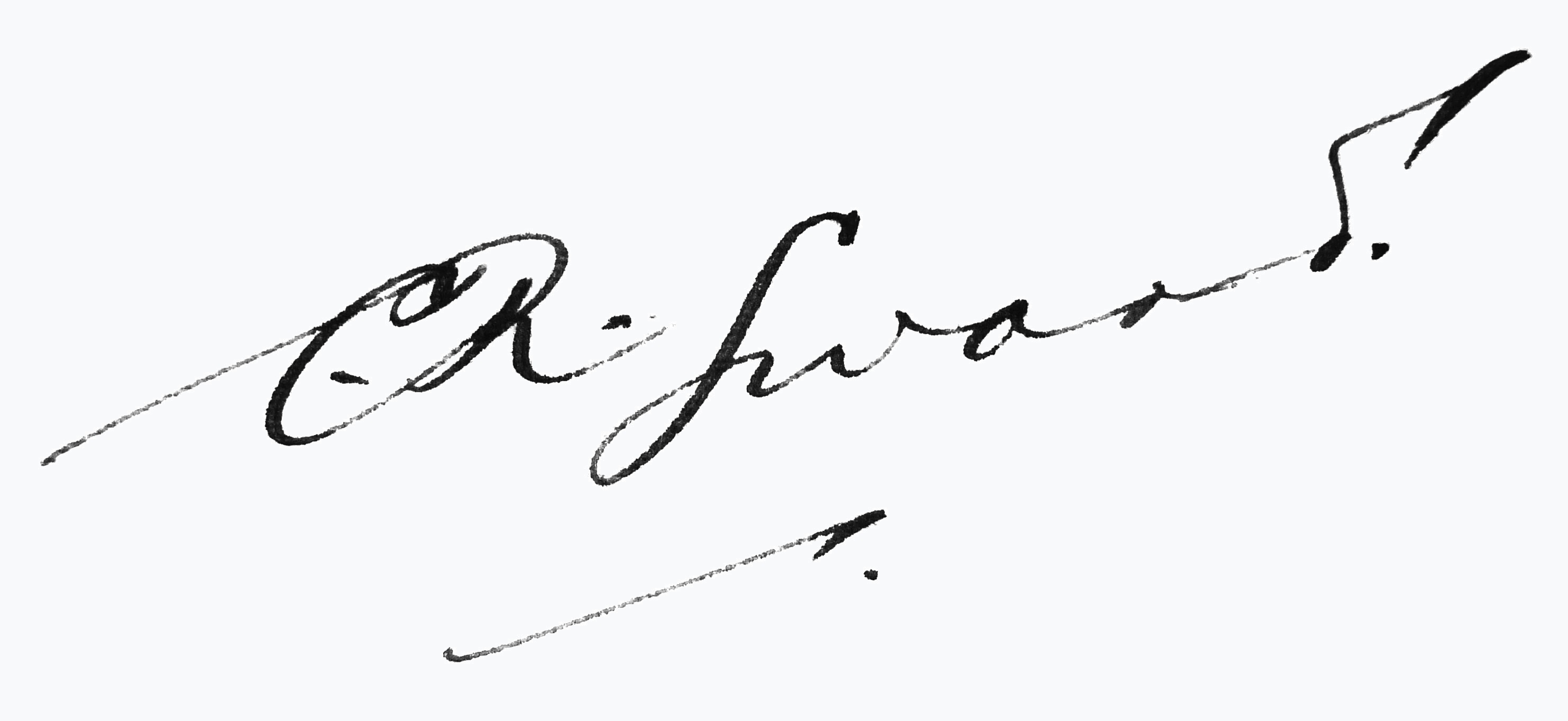
- Signature
- Nickname: Blackie

Charles Robberts Swart DMS (5 December 1894 – 16 July 1982), nicknamed "Blackie", was a South African politician who served as the last governor-general of the Union of South Africa from 1959 to 1961 and the first state president of the Republic of South Africa from 1961 to 1967.

== Early life ==
Swart was born on 5 December 1894 on the Morgenzon farm, in the Winburg district, part of the Boer republic of the Orange Free State (which became a British colony in 1902 and a province of the Union of South Africa in 1910).

He was the third of six children, born to Hermanus Bernardus Swart (1866–1949) and Aletta Catharina Robberts (1871–1927). The Anglo-Boer War (Second Boer War) broke out when he was five years old. During the war, his mother and the children were interned at the Winburg concentration camp. Out of the three boys, one died while in the concentration camp. His father was wounded and captured by the British during the Battle of Paardeberg. He became a prisoner-of-war and stayed in Greenpoint and Simon's Town until the end of the war.

Aged seven, Swart went to the government school in Winburg. He later went to a CNO (Christelike Nasionale Onderwys or "Christian National Education") school, set up by the Afrikaners in response to Lord Milner's anglicisation policy at the government-sponsored schools.

He established himself as a barrister in 1914. He spent a brief period in Hollywood acting in silent films, before embarking on his public career. He practised law in Bloemfontein from 1919–1948, with the exception of the time spent earning a degree in journalism from Columbia University in New York in 1921–22. He reported briefly from Washington for the Die Burger newspaper.

He was married to Cornelia Wilhelmina (Nellie) de Klerk and had three children. He was a tall man at 200 centimetres (6 ft 7 in).

== Public life ==
In 1923, he was elected to the House of Assembly as the Member of Parliament for Ladybrand. until he was defeated in 1938. Swart was a member of the Ossewabrandwag. He became leader of the National Party in the Orange Free State and MP for Winburg in 1941. After the end of the Second World War, he was appointed Minister of Justice when the National Party came to power in 1948, and was responsible for legislation to strengthen the powers of the South African Police to suppress anti-apartheid activity. Between 1949 and 1950 he held the portfolio for Education, Arts and Science and served as Deputy Prime Minister between 1954 and 1959.

In 1959, Swart was appointed Governor-General, but like his predecessor Ernest George Jansen, he was a staunch republican. Despite this, he had earlier kneeled before Queen Elizabeth II and kissed her hand. In a referendum the following year, a small majority of white voters endorsed a government proposal to become a republic. In 1961, after signing into law the new republican constitution passed by Parliament, he asked the Queen to release him from office, and Parliament then elected him as state president, the new post that replaced the monarch and the Governor-General as ceremonial head of state. Nelson Mandela and other underground black resistance leaders tried to protest against the change to the new system by planning a three-day general strike of non-white workers, but the government preemptively averted most of these plans through an extensive use of police force to persecute the dissenters.

Although elected for a seven-year term in office, Swart served as state president for only six years, and he retired in 1967. After his retirement, Swart was awarded the Decoration for Meritorious Services by State President Jim Fouché. He died on 16 July 1982, aged 87. Swart was popularly known as "Blackie" (Swart is Afrikaans for "black") or as "Oom Blackie", oom being Afrikaans for "uncle", but used as a sign of respect towards an older male.

== Legacy ==
The tallest building in Bloemfontein, which housed various governmental departments and the Law Faculty of the University of the Orange Free State, was named the President CR Swart Building in his honour. In 2015, the ANC government renamed the popular CR Swart Building the Fidel Castro Building.

A statue of CR Swart at the University of the Free State was destroyed by protesting students in late-February 2016.

The highest peak in the remote Prince Edward Islands was called State President Swart Peak, before it was renamed Mascarin Peak in 2003.

Swart's portrait is depicted on the obverses of the coins of the South African rand – from 1 to 50 Cents dated 1968, which was struck to commemorate him as the first State President of South Africa.

Political offices
Preceded by Lucas Cornelius Steyn	Governor-General of South Africa; 1959–1961	Position abolished South Africa became a republic
Preceded by Elizabeth II; Queen of South Africa	State President of South Africa; 1961–1967	Succeeded by Tom Naudé
