= Jim Fouché =

President of South Africa from 1968 to 1975

J. J. Fouché DMS
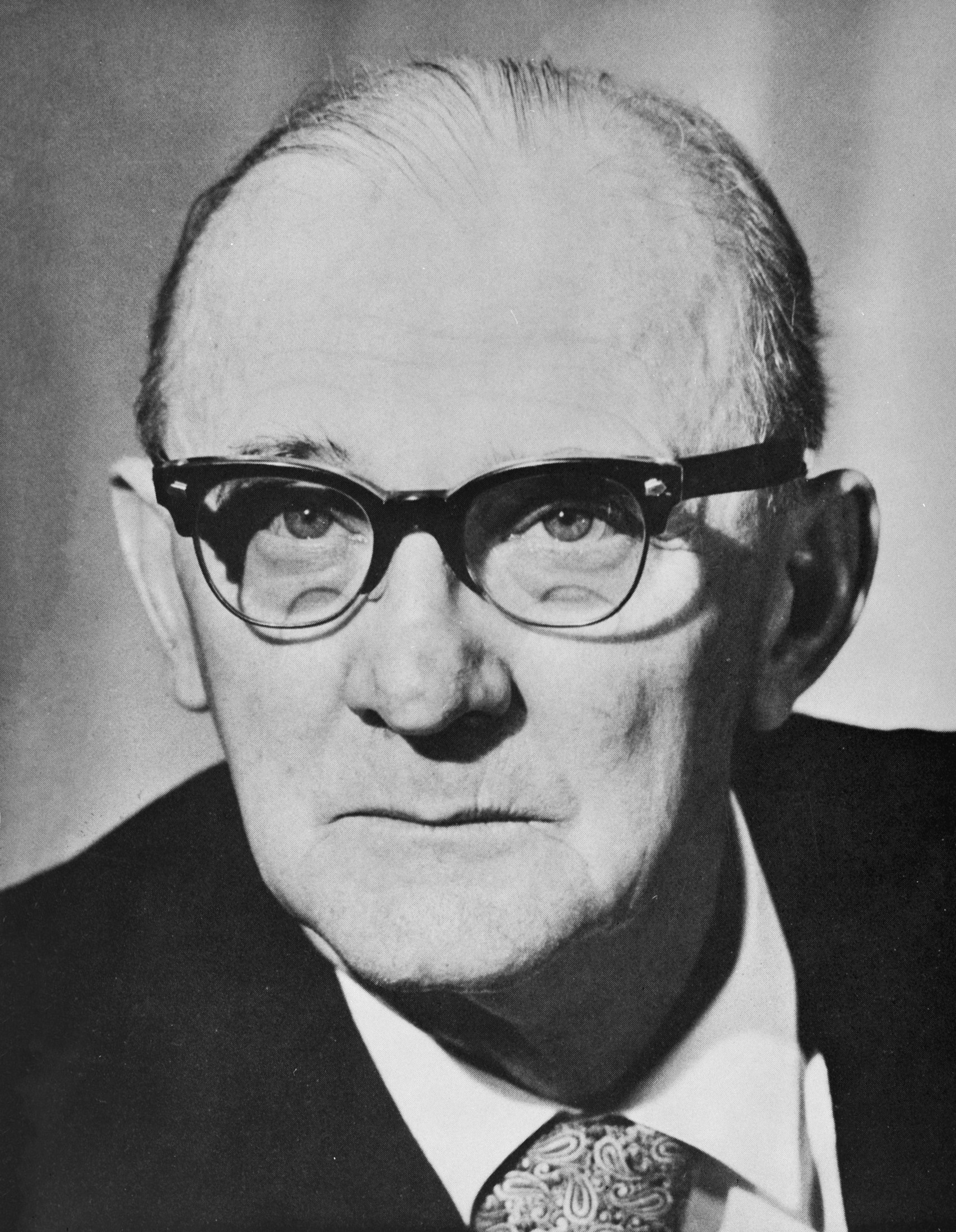
- Fouché in 1968

2nd State President of South Africa
- In office 10 April 1968 – 9 April 1975
- Prime Minister: Johannes Vorster
- Preceded by: Charles Robberts Swart
- Succeeded by: Nicolaas Diederichs

Minister of Agricultural Technical Services and Water Affairs
- In office 1966–1968
- Prime Minister: Hendrik Verwoerd
- Preceded by: Pieter Kruger Le Roux
- Succeeded by: Dirk Cornelius Uys

Minister of Defence
- In office 14 December 1959 – 1 April 1966
- Prime Minister: Hendrik Verwoerd; Johannes Vorster
- Preceded by: Frans Erasmus
- Succeeded by: Pieter Willem Botha

Personal details
- Born: Jacobus Johannes Fouché; 6 June 1898 Wepener, Orange Free State
- Died: 23 September 1980 (aged 82) Cape Town, South Africa
- Party: National
- Spouse: Letta McDonald (m. 1920)
- Children: 2

Jacobus Johannes Fouché DMS (6 June 1898 – 23 September 1980), also known as J. J. Fouché, was a South African politician who served as the second state president of South Africa from 1968 to 1975.

== Early life ==
He was born in the Boer republic of the Orange Free State in 1898 (which became a British colony in 1902 and a province of the Union of South Africa in 1910) and matriculated at Paarl Boys' High School.

== Education ==
His higher education was at Victoria College, Stellenbosch and would obtain his Honours degree and a D.Phil. at Stellenbosch University in 1966.

== Career ==
Fouché was a successful farmer. A staunch republican, he was a member of the National Party for many years, first being elected to the House of Assembly as MP for Smithfield from 1941 to 1950, and as MP for Bloemfontein West between 1960 and 1968.

Fouché served as Administrator of the Orange Free State province from 1950 to 1959, and was then promoted to the Cabinet, where he served as Minister of Defence from 14 December 1959 to 1 April 1966 and as Minister of Agricultural Technical Services and Water Affairs from 1966 to 1968. He was elected State President in place of Ebenhaezer Dönges (who had been elected, but died before he could take office), and served as ceremonial head of state from 1968 to 1975. He was the only State President to complete a full term in office, and remained the longest-serving president until 2006, when surpassed by Thabo Mbeki.

== Family ==
Fouché married Letta Rhoda ('Lettie') McDonald, a fellow white woman of Anglo-African descent and Scots extraction.

== Depiction on coins ==
He is depicted on the following coins of the South African rand;

1976 1/2 Cent to 50 Cents.

== Honours ==
He was awarded the South African Decoration for Meritorious Services and the Paraguayan National Order of Merit. Fouché was also an honorary colonel of Regiment President Steyn.

Political offices
Preceded by Tom Naudé	State President of South Africa; 1968–1975	Succeeded by Nicolaas Johannes Diederichs
Preceded by P. K. Le Roux	Minister of Agricultural and Technical Services and Water Affairs; 1966-1968	Succeeded by D. C. H. Uys
Preceded by Frans Erasmus	Minister of Defence (South Africa); 1959–1966	Succeeded by Pieter Willem Botha
