= Nico Diederichs =

President of South Africa from 1975 to 1978

Nico Diederichs DMS
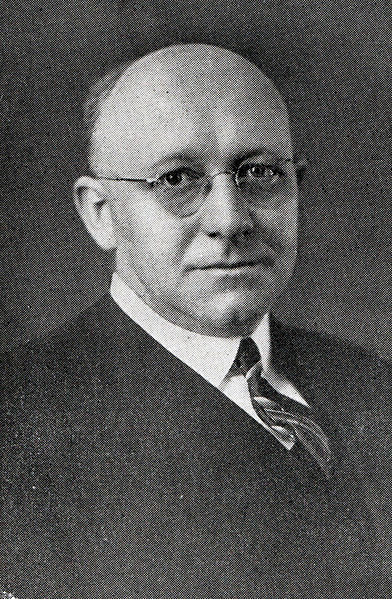
- Diederichs in 1953

3rd State President of South Africa
- In office 19 April 1975 – 21 August 1978
- Prime Minister: Johannes Vorster
- Preceded by: Jacobus Fouché
- Succeeded by: Johannes Vorster

Minister of Finance
- In office 1967–1975
- Preceded by: Ebenhaezer Dönges
- Succeeded by: Owen Horwood

Personal details
- Born: 17 November 1903 Ladybrand, Orange River Colony (now South Africa)
- Died: 21 August 1978 (aged 74) Cape Town, Cape Province, South Africa
- Citizenship: South African citizenship
- Party: National Party; Pro-Ossewabrandwag
- Spouse: Marga Potgieter (1908–1996)
- Children: 4
- Education: Ludwig-Maximilians-Universität München; University of Cologne; Leiden University

Nicolaas Johannes Diederichs, DMS (17 November 1903 – 21 August 1978) served as the third state president of South Africa from 1975 to 1978.

== Education and career ==
After completing school, he attended Grey University College between 1921 and 1925 where he obtained a Bachelor of Arts (Dutch & Ethics) and Master of Arts (Philosophy). As an economist, he educated himself overseas at the Ludwig-Maximilians-Universität München, the University of Cologne, the Friedrich Wilhelm University of Berlin, and Leiden University, obtaining a doctorate from Leiden University and a D.Litt degree. Resuming a career in South Africa, he became a lecturer and later a professor at the University of the Orange Free State, in Political Science and Philosophy. During the 1930s and 1940s, he became a prominent figure in Afrikaner nationalist circles. He founded the Reddingsdaadbond organisation to promote the economic wellbeing of Afrikaners.

After visiting the country in 1938, Diederichs became a staunch admirer of Nazi Germany.

== Political career ==
Diederichs was a National Party member of Parliament from 1948 to 1975, representing Randfontein until 1958 and then Losberg. He served as Minister of Economic Affairs from 1958 to 1967, as Minister of Mines from 1961 to 1964, and as Minister of Finance from 1967 to 1975. In the latter capacity he became known as "Mr Gold". He served as the first chancellor of the Rand Afrikaans University and ceremonial State President of South Africa from 1975 until his death, after a short illness, of a heart attack on 21 August 1978 in Cape Town.

== Honours ==
Diederichs was honoured with medals from various countries. He was awarded a gold medal from the City of Paris (1971), made a Knight of the Greater Cross of the Order of Merit of the Italian Republic in 1973, and an Order of Merit from Paraguay in 1974. He was awarded honorary doctoral degrees from the University of the Orange Free State and the University of Stellenbosch.

- Decoration for Meritorious Services

=== Depiction on coins ===
He is depicted on the obverses of the 1979 coins of the South African rand from 1/2 cent to 1 rand, which were struck as a memorial commemorative series.

== Publications by Nicolaas Diederichs (selection) ==
- Nicolaas Diederichs: Vom Leiden und Dulden. Bonn, 1930. (Dissertation Leiden University)
- N. Diederichs: Die Volkebond, sy ontstaan, samestelling en werksaamhede. Pretoria, 1933
- N. Diederichs: Nasionalisme as lewensbeskouing en sy verhouding tot internasionalisme. Bloemfontein, 1936

Political offices
Preceded by Johannes de Klerk (acting)	State President of South Africa; 1975–1978	Succeeded by B. J. Vorster
Preceded by Theophilus Donges	Finance ministers of South Africa; 1967–1975	Succeeded by Owen Horwood
