= 1970 South African Senate election =

- 16 November 1970

44 of 54 seats in the Senate 28 seats needed for a majority
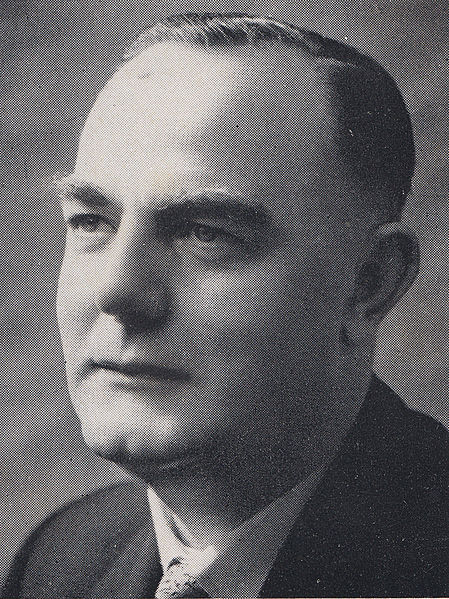

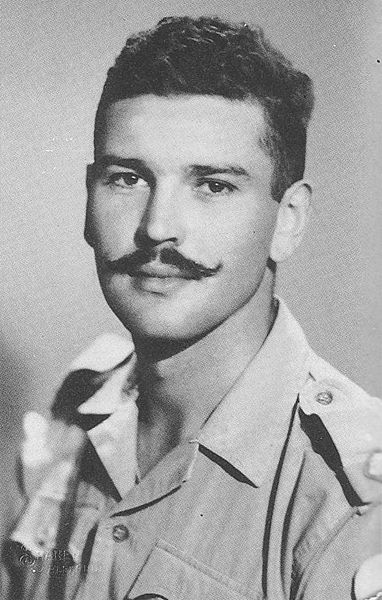
| | First party | Second party |
|---|---|---|
| Leader | B. J. Vorster | De Villiers Graaff |
| Party | National | United |
| Last election | 40 seats | 13 seats |
| Seats won | 41 | 13 |
| Seat change | ▲1 | Steady |
| Percentage | 75.93% | 24.07% |
- Seat composition in the Senate after the election

The election for the ninth Senate of South Africa took place on November 16, 1970. The result was a victory for the ruling National Party, winning 31 out of the 44 elected seats and 41 out of the total 54 seats.

According to section 29(2)(b) of the 1961 constitution, "at least one of the two senators nominated from each province under this section shall be thoroughly acquainted, by reason of official experience or otherwise, with the interests of the coloured population in the province for which the said senator is nominated". The seat of an additional (white) senator nominated in accordance with section 7 of the Separate Representation of Voters Act, 1951"on the ground of his thorough acquaintance, by reason of his official experience or otherwise, with the reasonable wants and wishes of the non-European [i.e. Coloured, as black Africans were explicitly excluded from the definition under section 1 (ii) of the 1951 act] population in the province of the Cape of Good Hope", had been vacant since 1962 and was finally abolished by the Separate Representation of Voters Amendment Act, 1968 with effect from the elections in 1970.
