= 1965 South African Senate election =

- 26 November 1965

43 of 53 seats in the Senate 27 seats needed for a majority
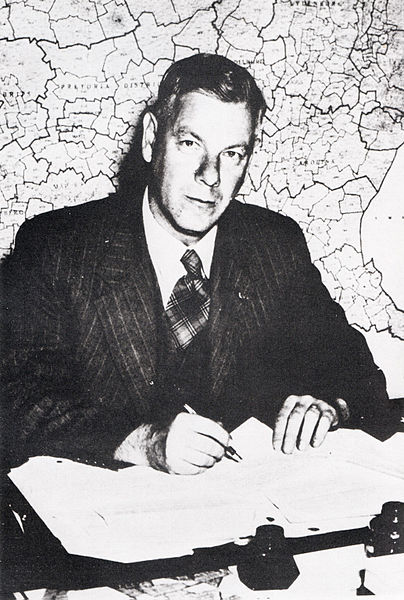

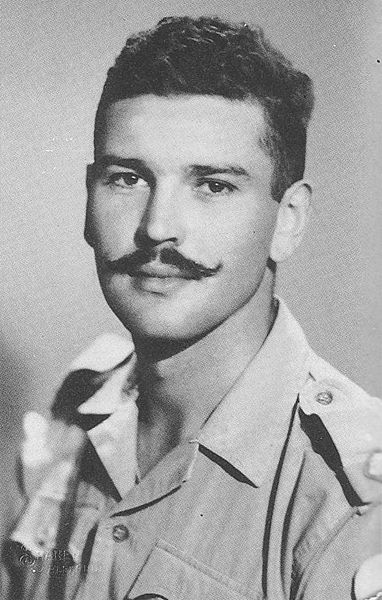
	First party	Second party
Leader	Hendrik Verwoerd	De Villiers Graaff
Party	National	United
Last election	38 seats	15 seats
Seats won	40	13
Seat change	▲2	▼2
Percentage	75.47%	24.53%
- Seat composition in the Senate after the election

The election for the eighth Senate of South Africa took place on November 26, 1965, the first election to that body to be held under the 1961 republican constitution and the first in which a representative of the coloured community was not elected. The result was a victory for the ruling National Party, winning 30 out of the 43 elected seats and 40 out of the total 53 seats.

According to section 29(2)(b) of the 1961 constitution, "at least one of the two senators nominated from each province under this section shall be thoroughly acquainted, by reason of official experience or otherwise, with the interests of the coloured population in the province for which the said senator is nominated". An additional (white) senator should have been nominated in accordance with section 7 of the Separate Representation of Voters Act, 1951 "on the ground of his thorough acquaintance, by reason of his official experience or otherwise, with the reasonable wants and wishes of the non-European [i.e. Coloured, as black Africans were explicitly excluded from the definition under section 1 (ii) of the 1951 act] population in the province of the Cape of Good Hope", but this seat continued to be left vacant (as it had been since 1962). The Separate Representation of Voters Amendment Act, 1968 explicitly prohibited to fill the vacancy and finally abolished this seat with effect from 1970.
