= Senate of South Africa =

Upper house of South African Parliament

The Senate was the upper house of the Parliament of South Africa between 1910 and its abolition from 1 January 1981, and between 1994 and 1997.

== 1910–1981 ==
Senate of South Africa Senaat van Suid-Afrika
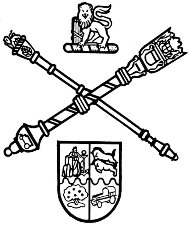

Type
- Type: Upper house

History
- Established: 1910
- Disbanded: 1981
- Succeeded by: President's Council

Leadership
- President of the Senate: Francis William Reitz (First); Jimmy Kruger (Last)

Elections
- Voting system: Indirectly elected by members of the House of Assembly and Provincial Councils and appointed by the State President on the advice of the Prime Minister
- Last election: 30 May 1974

Meeting place
- Houses of Parliament; Cape Town, Cape Province; South Africa

Under white minority rule in the Union of South Africa, most of the senators were chosen by an electoral college consisting of members of each of the four provincial councils and Members of the House of Assembly (the lower house of Parliament, directly elected). The remaining Senators were appointed by the governor-general of the Union on the advice of the prime minister. The Senate's presiding officer was called the president, whereas his counterpart in the House of Assembly was the speaker.

=== First Senate (1910–1920) ===
The South Africa Act 1909, which created the Senate, included special provisions for the selection of the first elected senators. The Union Parliament was prohibited from changing the arrangements for the Senate during its first ten years.

The First Senate included eight senators from each province. They were elected for a ten-year term, by the members serving during the final session of the legislatures of each of the four colonies which joined the Union of South Africa. The election was by a form of the single transferable vote. The remaining eight seats were filled, by appointment (also for ten-year terms) by the Governor-General-in-Council (in effect by General Louis Botha's first Union government). Section 24 of the South Africa Act 1909 provided that, of the nominated senators,

One-half of their number shall be selected on the ground mainly of their thorough acquaintance, by reason of their official experience or otherwise, with the reasonable wants and wishes of the coloured races in South Africa.

Casual vacancies in the representation of the provinces, in the First Senate only, were filled by an electoral college composed of the members of the relevant Provincial Council. New senators, elected in this way, held the seat for the residue of the ten-year term. Nominated senators, appointed to fill vacancies, received a ten-year term and did not have to vacate their seats at the end of the term for the provincial representatives.

The composition, by party, of the provincial representatives in the First Senate included 18 representatives of the three colonial governing parties (six each from the South African Party of the Cape, Orangia Unie of the Orange River Colony and Het Volk of the Transvaal), eight Independent Senators from Natal (which did not have a party system before the Union), and six Senators from the opposition parties (two each from the Unionist Party of the Cape, the Constitutional Party of Orange River Colony and the Progressive Party of Transvaal).

=== Second Senate (1920–1929) ===
The eight senators, elected for each province under the ordinary provisions for senate elections in the South Africa Act 1909, were returned by an electoral college composed of the members from the province in the House of Assembly and the Provincial Council. In 1920 the Senate term was for ten years and there was no provision for an earlier dissolution of the Senate.

The provisions for nominated senators were unchanged from those in the First Senate.

The Second Senate had a small majority for the South African Party (SAP). When the National Party (NP)-led Pact government took office in 1924, its supporters were therefore in a minority in the Senate.

The Senate Act 1926 modified the original constitutional provisions for the Senate. A new power was conferred so that the Governor-General-in-Council could dissolve the whole Senate (vacating both elected and nominated seats), either at the time of a general election for the House of Assembly or within 120 days of the election. Another provision required the nominated Senators to vacate their seats whenever there was a change of government.

After the South African general election, 1929 the Senate dissolution power was used for the first time, on 16 August 1929.

=== Third Senate (1929–1939) ===
The Third Senate had a small NP majority, in 1929. After the NP and the SAP formed a coalition in 1933 and fused to form the United Party (UP) in 1934, the government had a large Senate majority.

The UP government passed the Representation of Natives Act 1936. This legislation affected the Senate by adding another four senators to represent the black population of South Africa. The Native Representative senators were white people, who held office for a fixed term and were not affected by a dissolution of the Senate. The new seats were filled by indirect election, the black electors being officeholders such as tribal chiefs and the members of local government bodies.

Just before the expiry of the ten-year Senate term, the UP split over the issue of South Africa's participation in the Second World War. The followers of the former prime minister J. B. M. Hertzog entered the 1939 Senate election as a separate party, having left the United Party but not yet arranged a merger with the opposition Purified National Party.

=== Fourth Senate (1939–1948) ===
The provincial electoral colleges met on 17 November 1939. After the election and the filling of the nominated seats, the Senate was left with a pro-war majority. There were 24 pro-government Senators (20 UP including seven nominated members, two Dominion Party and two Labour Party) and 16 opposition Senators (10 supporters of General Hertzog including one nominated member, and 6 Purified National Party). The four Native Representative Senators were also pro-war.

After the South African general election, 1948 a Reunited National Party-Afrikaner Party coalition came to power, with minority support in the Senate. The new government used the dissolution power, to trigger a new Senate election. The Senate was dissolved, on 9 July 1948.

=== Fifth Senate (1948–1955) ===
The eight nominated senators were appointed on 28 July 1948 and the Electoral Colleges met in the provincial capitals the following day. At the end of this process the government had 22 supporters (Reunited National Party 11, Afrikaner Party 2, Independent 1 and the 8 nominated Senators) and the opposition 21 (United Party 15, Labour Party 3, and Native Representatives 3). The fourth Native Representative seat was vacant.

The South West Africa Affairs Amendment Act 1949, added four additional members to the Senate, of whom two were to be elected, and two nominated by the governor-general. The elected senators were chosen by an Electoral College, composed of the members of South West Africa's Legislative Assembly and the six members of the House of Assembly representing the territory.

Of the nominated senators, one was to be selected mainly on the ground of his "thorough acquaintance, by reason of his official experience or otherwise, with the reasonable wants and wishes or the coloured races of the territory". All four senators chosen on 29 September 1950 were NP supporters.

=== Senate Act 1955 (Senate 1955–1960) ===
In 1955, Nationalist prime minister Johannes Strijdom attempted to amend one of the entrenched clauses in the Constitution, to deprive Coloured people of their voting rights, but his party did not have the constitutionally required two-thirds majority in a joint session of both houses of Parliament. It was decided to alter the composition and electoral system for the Senate, to enable the Separate Representation of Voters Act 1951 to be validated. Consequently, Strijdom had the Senate Act 1955 passed to amend the constitution.

Instead of each province electing eight senators, by proportional representation, the new system required provincial representatives to be selected by a first past the post election in the Electoral College. The effect of this was to enable the majority group from each province (NP in all the provinces, except for Natal) to secure all the seats available. In addition Cape Province and Transvaal had their representation increased to 22 and 27 seats respectively. The number of nominated Senators from the Union of South Africa was doubled from eight to sixteen. The representation of South-West Africa and black voters was unchanged.

Another change made in 1955 was to reduce senatorial terms from ten years to five. The size of the Senate rose from 48 to 89 (increased to 90 in 1956 when a nominated Senator was added to represent the coloured population for a fixed term until 1962).

=== Senate Act 1960 (Senate 1960–1980) ===
At the end of the last term of the Native Representative senators, in 1960, those seats were abolished. The Senate Act 1960 reduced the size of the Senate and reinstated proportional representation elections. However instead of going back to eight senators per province, the Cape would have 11, Transvaal 14 (15 from 1970) and the two smaller provinces would retain 8 Senators. Again, the representation from South-West Africa was unchanged. The number of nominated senators from the Union, went back to eight and the requirement for half of them to be acquainted with the 'reasonable wants and wishes' of non-white South Africans was abolished.

The Senate was reduced in size to 54 in 1960 and 53 in 1962 (as the representative of the coloured community retained his seat until 1962).

The Senate composition remained unchanged by the declaration of the Republic of South Africa in 1961, except that the State President took over the role of the governor-general in appointing Senators. Under the republican Constitution, the president of the Senate was to act as State President whenever that office was vacant, or if a state president was unable to perform his duties.

Section 28 (1) (a) of the Republic of South Africa Constitution Act 1961, provided that there should be "eight senators nominated by the State President of whom two shall be nominated from each province ...". The South Africa Act 1909 had not limited the number of nominated senators to be from any particular province.

South-West Africa's representation in the South African Parliament was abolished in 1977, to pave the way for independence for the territory.

== Abolition of the Senate ==
In 1980, Prime Minister P.W Botha began a process of constitutional reform, with the establishment of the President's Council, a 60-seat advisory body with provision for ten Coloureds, five Indians, and one Chinese, but no black members. As a consequence, the Senate was deemed to be redundant and would be dissolved. It was abolished under the terms of the Republic of South Africa Constitution Fifth Amendment Act with effect from 1 January 1981, which established the President's Council from the same date.

In 1984, the former Senate chamber was converted for use as the House of Representatives, reserved for Coloureds under the tricameral system. Black South Africans remained excluded from the political process.

== 1994–1997 ==
Senate of South Africa
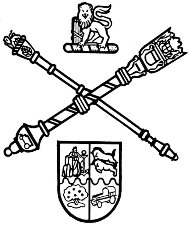

Type
- Type: Upper house

History
- Established: 1994
- Disbanded: 1997
- Succeeded by: National Council of Provinces

Leadership
- President of the Senate: Kobie Coetsee

Elections
- Voting system: Indirectly elected by the provincial legislatures

Meeting place
- Houses of Parliament; Cape Town, Western Cape; South Africa

Under the country's first non-racial (interim) constitution in 1994, the Senate was once again the upper house of a bicameral parliament, the lower house being the National Assembly. It was indirectly elected by members of each of the nine Provincial Legislatures, with each province having ten Senators. In 1997, the final constitution replaced the Senate with a National Council of Provinces (NCoP), which retained the former Senate's membership, but changed its legislative and constitutional role.

== Presidents of the Senate of South Africa (1910–1980 and 1994–1997) ==
No.	Term	Name
1	1910–1921	Francis William Reitz
2	1921–1929	H.C. van Heerden
3	1929–1930	R.A. Kerr
4	1930–1940	Christiaan Andries van Niekerk (1st time)
5	1940–1941	François Stephanus Malan
6	1942–1945	Philippus Arnoldus Myburgh
7	1946–1948	P.J. Wessels
8	1948–1961	Christiaan Andries van Niekerk (2nd time)
9	1961–1969	Tom Naudé
10	1969–1976	Johannes de Klerk
11	1976–1979	Marais Viljoen
12	1979–1980	Jimmy Kruger
–	1981–1994	office not in existence
13	1994–1997	Kobie Coetsee

== Composition (1910–1980) ==
=== Composition by province and type of Senator (1910–1980) ===
Period	Cape	Nat	OFS	SWA	Tvl	Total ord.	Nom	NRS	Total Sen.
1910–1937	8	8	8	–	8	32	8	–	40
1937–1950	8	8	8	–	8	32	8	4	44
1950–1955	8	8	8	2	8	34	10	4	48
1955–1956	22	8	8	2	27	67	18	4	89
1956–1960	22	8	8	2	27	67	19	4	90
1960–1962	11	8	8	2	14	43	11	–	54
1962–1970	11	8	8	2	14	43	10	–	53
1970–1980	11	8	8	2	15	44	10	–	54

Abbreviations and notes:-

- Ordinary Senators (returned at general Senate elections)
- Cape: Cape of Good Hope
- Nat: Natal
- OFS: Orange Free State
- SWA: South-West Africa (represented in the Senate from 1950)
- Tvl: Transvaal
- Nominated and representative Senators (not selected at general Senate elections)
- Nom: Nominated Senators: South Africa 8 (1910–1955), 16 (1955–1960), 8 (from 1960); South-West Africa 2 (from 1950); Coloured representative 1 (1956–1962). After 1961, the eight South African nominees were required to be split into two per province.
- NRS: Native representative Senators (represented in the Senate 1937–1960)

=== Composition by party (1948–1980) ===
==== Fifth Senate (1948–1955) ====
Previous Senate dissolved 9 July 1948. Election of ordinary Senators on 29 July 1948 and appointment of nominated Senators on 28 July 1948 (Native representatives unaffected).

Party	Cape	Nat	OFS	Tvl	Total	Nom	NRS	Total
United Party	4	6	1	4	15	–	–	15
Reunited National Party	3	–	5	3	11	–	–	11
Nominated	–	–	–	–	-	8	–	8
Labour Party	1	1*	–	1*	3	–	–	3
NRS	–	–	–	–	-	–	3	3
Afrikaner Party	–	–	2	–	2	–	–	2
Independent	–	1	–	–	1	–	–	1
vacant	–	–	–	–	-	–	1	1
Total	8	8	8	8	32	8	4	44

Notes:-

- (1) The nominated Senators were supporters of the Reunited National-Afrikaner coalition, but their party allegiances are not reported in the source used.
- (2)* The source used gives returns for 7 Natal and 9 Transvaal Senators, which is clearly wrong. The second Labour Senator attributed to Transvaal has been re-allocated to Natal, as this seems the most likely distribution, having regard to the composition of the electoral colleges and the overall results.

==== Sixth Senate (1955–1960) ====
Previous Senate dissolved 4 November 1955. Election of ordinary Senators on 25 November 1955 and appointment of nominated Senators on 6 December 1955 (Native representatives unaffected).

Party	Cape	Nat	OFS	SWA	Tvl	Total	Nom	NRS	Total
National Party	22	–	8	2	27	59	18	–	77
United Party	–	8	–	–	–	8	–	–	8
NRS	–	–	–	–	–	-	–	4	4
Total	22	8	8	2	27	67	18	4	89

==== Seventh Senate (1960–1965) ====
Election of ordinary Senators on 26 October 1960 and appointment of nominated Senators on 16 November 1960 (Coloured representative unaffected).

Party	Cape	Nat	OFS	SWA	Tvl	Total	Nom	Total
National Party	7	1	8	2	10	28	10	38
United Party	4	7	–	–	4	15	–	15
Coloured rep.	–	–	–	–	–	-	1	1
Total	11	8	8	2	14	43	11	54

==== Eighth Senate (1965–1970) ====
Election of ordinary Senators on 26 November 1965 and appointment of nominated Senators 1965.

Party	Cape	Nat	OFS	SWA	Tvl	Total	Nom	Total
National Party	7	2	8	2	11	30	10	40
United Party	4	6	–	–	3	13	–	13
Total	11	8	8	2	14	43	10	53

==== Ninth Senate (1970–1974) ====
Election of ordinary Senators on 16 November 1970 and appointment of nominated Senators 1970.

Party	Cape	Nat	OFS	SWA	Tvl	Total	Nom	Total
National Party	8	1	8	2	12	31	10	41
United Party	3	7	–	–	3	13	–	13
Total	11	8	8	2	15	44	10	54

==== Tenth Senate (1974–1980) ====
Election of ordinary Senators on 30 May 1974 and appointment of nominated Senators 1974.

Party	Cape	Nat	OFS	SWA	Tvl	Total	Nom	Total
National Party	8	2	8	2	12	32	10	42
United Party	3	6	–	–	3	12	–	12
Total	11	8	8	2	15	44	10	54

== Sources ==
- Keesing's Contemporary Archives (various volumes)
- The South African Constitution, by H.J. May (3rd edition 1955, Juta & Co)
