= 1960 South African Senate election =

- 26 October 1960

44 of 54 seats in the Senate 28 seats needed for a majority
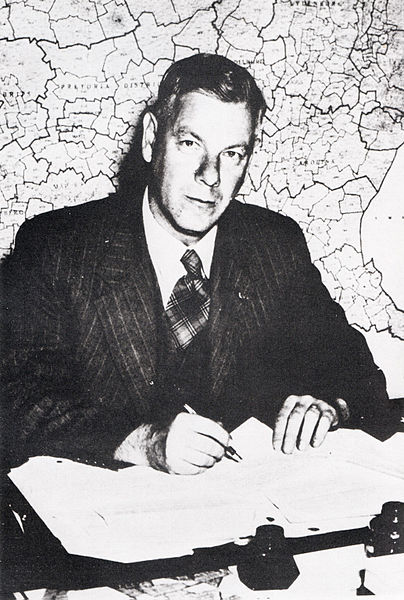

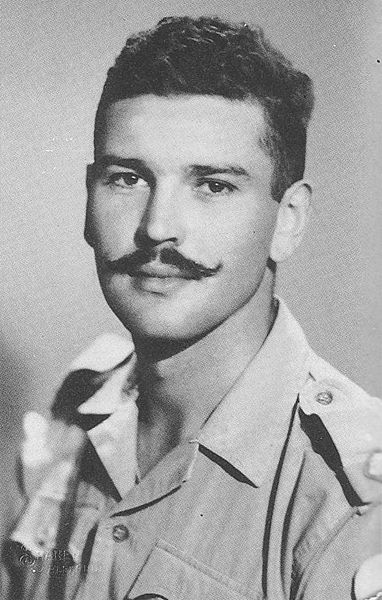
	First party	Second party
Leader	Hendrik Verwoerd	De Villiers Graaff
Party	National	United
Last election	77 seats	8 seats
Seats won	38	15
Seat change	▼39	▲7
Percentage	70.37%	27.78%
- Seat composition in the Senate after the election

The election for the seventh Senate of South Africa took place on October 26, 1960, with the appointment of nominated Senators by the Governor-General taking place on November 16, 1960.

Before this election, the seats reserved for Native Representatives seats were abolished. The Senate Act 1960 reduced the size of the Senate and reinstated proportional representation elections, as it had been up until the election of 1955. However, instead of going back to eight Senators per province, the Cape would have 11, Transvaal 14 (15 from 1970) and the two smaller provinces would retain 8 Senators. Again, the representation from South-West Africa was unchanged. The number of nominated Senators went back to eight.

The requirement for half of the appointed senators to be "acquainted with the 'reasonable wants and wishes' of non-white South Africans" was reworded so that "at least one of the two appointed senators [for each province or South West Africa] must be thoroughly acquainted with the interests of the Cape Coloured, Malay and Griqua people in the province or territory concerned and capable of serving as a channel through which these interests may be promoted". This provision was essentially reiterated in section 29(b)(2) of the 1961 constitution that contained "the requirement that at least one of the two senators nominated from each province under this section shall be thoroughly acquainted, by reason of official experience or otherwise, with the interests of the coloured population in the province for which the said senator is nominated".

The Senate was thus reduced in size to 54 in 1960 and then to 53 in 1962 (as the representative of the "non-European" — i.e. Coloured, as black Africans were explicitly excluded from the definition under section 1 (ii) of the 1951 act — population in the Cape Province nominated in 1957 based on section 7 of the Separate Representation of Voters Act, 1951 retained his seat until 1962). This additional seat was left vacant from 1962 onwards, but was formally abolished only in 1970 in terms of the Separate Representation of Voters Amendment Act, 1968.

The Senate composition remained unchanged by the declaration of the Republic of South Africa in 1961, except that the State President took over the role of the Governor-General in appointing Senators. Under the republican Constitution, the President of the Senate was to act as State President whenever that office was vacant, or if a state president was unable to perform his duties.

Section 28 (1) (a) of the Republic of South Africa Constitution Act 1961, provided that there should be "eight senators nominated by the State President of whom two shall be nominated from each province ...". The South Africa Act 1909 had not limited the number of nominated senators to be from any particular province.
