= Coloured vote constitutional crisis =

1950s constitutional crisis in South Africa

The Coloured vote constitutional crisis, also known as the Coloured vote case, was a constitutional crisis that occurred in the Union of South Africa during the 1950s as the result of an attempt by the Nationalist government to remove coloured voters in the Union's Cape Province from the common voters' rolls. It developed into a dispute between the judiciary (in particular the Appellate Division of the Supreme Court) and the other branches of government (Parliament and the executive) over the power of Parliament to amend an entrenched clause in the South Africa Act 1909 (the constitution) and the power of the Appellate Division to overturn the amendment as unconstitutional. The crisis ended when the government enlarged the Senate and altered its method of election, allowing the amendment to be successfully enacted.

== Background ==
Before the creation of the Union of South Africa, elections in the Cape Colony were conducted on the basis of the qualified franchise. This meant that the right to vote was limited to men meeting property and literacy qualifications, but not restricted on the basis of race. This differed from the other South African colonies: in Natal the franchise was limited to white men in practice though not in law, while in the Transvaal and the Orange River Colony the franchise was limited by law to white men. The South Africa Act 1909, which was an act of the Parliament of the United Kingdom, unified these four colonies to form the Union but preserved their franchise arrangements unchanged. Section 35 of the South Africa Act 1909 provided that no law could disenfranchise voters in the Cape Province on the basis of race, unless that law was passed by an absolute supermajority of two-thirds of the members of both Houses of Parliament sitting together in a joint session. Section 35 was entrenched by section 152, which provided that neither section 35 nor section 152 itself could be amended without a similar supermajority in joint session.

In 1931, the Statute of Westminster ended the power of the British Parliament to legislate for dominions such as South Africa and gave those dominions the power to repeal or amend British laws in force within their territories. In 1936, the South African Parliament enacted the Representation of Natives Act, 1936, removing "native" (black) voters from the common voters' rolls and allowing them to elect, separately, three members of the House of Assembly (the lower house) instead. Although this act was passed by the required joint-session supermajority, its validity was challenged by an affected voter in the case of Ndlwana v Hofmeyr. The challenge was rejected for a number of reasons, of which the most significant was the Appellate Division's ruling that because Parliament was a sovereign legislative body, courts could not invalidate one of its acts on the basis of the procedure used to pass it.

== Separate Representation of Voters Bill ==
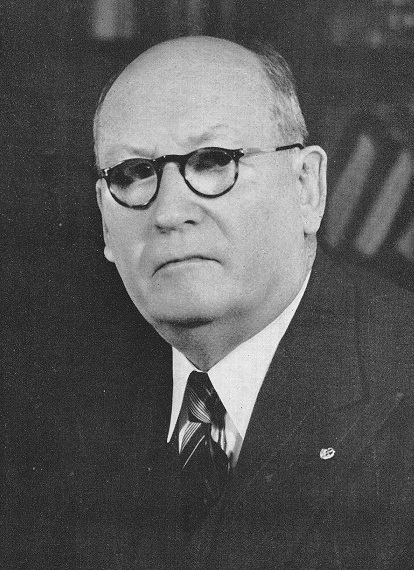
D. F. Malan, Prime Minister from 1948 to 1954.

In 1948, the National Party, campaigning on a platform of apartheid, won that year's general election. The following year, Prime Minister D. F. Malan addressed the question of coloured voting rights in a speech to Parliament, claiming that coloured voters were corrupt and immature and that they posed a threat to white control in South Africa. The government then sought to echo the 1936 Representation of Natives Act by introducing, in 1951, the Separate Representation of Voters Bill, whereby coloured voters would also lose the right to vote for ordinary constituency members of the House of Assembly and instead elect four members at separate elections. Besides the Nationalists' ideological belief in white supremacy, the bill was also motivated by the electoral power of coloured voters to swing a number of Cape constituencies from the National Party to the United Party.

The bill attracted much opposition both inside and outside Parliament. The United Party leader J. G. N. Strauss was against it both because he saw it as a breach of commitments given by earlier National Party leaders and because he believed it would lead coloured people to form political alliances with black and Indian groups opposed to the white control of South Africa. A group of coloured activists formed the National Convention Co-ordinating Committee to oppose the bill within constitutional limits. The Franchise Action Council, a multi-racial organisation, led a campaign of rallies, strikes and civil disobedience. The Torch Commando was founded by white Second World War veterans in response to the bill but expanded into a more general movement against the government's policies.

The National Party did not have enough seats in Parliament to pass the bill with the two-thirds majority in joint sitting that would be required if the entrenchment of sections 35 and 152 was still valid. Based on the ruling in Ndlwana's case (see above) and the principle of parliamentary sovereignty, Malan's government decided to enact it by following the normal parliamentary procedure of a simple majority in each house separately. The Governor-General gave his assent on 15 June 1951 and the act was promulgated on 18 June.

== Judgment of the Appellate Division ==
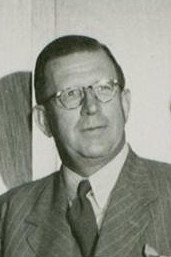
T. E. Dönges, Minister of the Interior from 1948 to 1958.

G. Harris, E. Franklin, W. D. Collins and E. A. Deane, four voters affected by the Separate Representation of Voters Act, challenged its validity in the Supreme Court in a case that became known as Harris v Dönges or Harris v Minister of the Interior, as T. E. Dönges was at the time Minister of the Interior. Initially the case was dismissed by the Cape Provincial Division in a ruling by Judge President de Villiers, with whom Newton Thompson and Gawie Steyn concurred. The court followed the precedent of Ndlwana v Hofmeyr to rule that it had no authority to question the validity of an act of Parliament promulgated and published by the proper authority. This decision was immediately taken on appeal to the Appellate Division.

The government's first contention was that the act did not disqualify voters on the basis of race, as all voters previously qualified were still able to vote, albeit in segregated constituencies. The court dismissed this argument as untenable. The government then argued that the entrenched clauses in the South Africa Act had been repealed by implication by the Statute of Westminster, and that the precedent of the Ndlwana case precluded the courts from questioning the validity of an act of Parliament.

The government's claim regarding the Statute of Westminster was based on two principal theories. The first was based on the repeal of the application of the Colonial Laws Validity Act to South Africa. The Colonial Laws Validity Act provided that any act of a colonial parliament would be valid within the colony unless it contradicted a British act applying to the colony. The argument was that an alteration of the Cape franchise without a two-thirds majority would have contradicted the South Africa Act (which was itself an act of the British Parliament) and therefore would be impermissible under the Colonial Laws Validity Act; and that once that act no longer applied the entrenchment was not enforceable. The court disagreed, noting that section 152 of the South Africa Act specifically empowered the South African Parliament to amend the South Africa Act, and that the Colonial Laws Validity Act had no application and therefore its repeal had no effect.

The second theory was that, by expanding the legislative powers of the dominion parliaments, the Statute of Westminster had abolished the requirement for a two-thirds majority in joint session. Section 2 of the Statute of Westminster gave a dominion parliament the power to repeal or amend any act of the British Parliament as it applied in the dominion. This power, so the argument went, had been granted to a Parliament consisting of two separate houses acting with simple majorities, and this power could be exercised to amend the entrenched clauses without regard to the supermajority requirement. Again the court disagreed, ruling that the "Parliament" to which the amendment power had been granted was the Parliament constituted by the South Africa Act, and that this definition of Parliament included the procedural requirement that certain bills be passed by two-thirds majority in joint session. This did not affect the doctrine of parliamentary sovereignty, as Parliament was fully sovereign over South Africa, and merely obliged to follow certain procedures to pass certain laws.

The final argument was that the principle of stare decisis bound the Appellate Division to follow the precedent of the Ndlwana case, in which it had ruled that Parliament can adopt any procedure it sees fit and the courts have no power to question the validity of its acts. The court ruled that it was entitled to overrule its own previous decisions if they were clearly wrong. In Ndlwana there had been no discussion of the Statute of Westminster nor any argument for or against the conclusion drawn by the court, and the court therefore felt free to overrule it.

The resulting order of the Appellate Division was that the Separate Representation of Voters Act was "invalid, null and void and of no legal force and effect". The ruling, authored by Chief Justice Albert van der Sandt Centlivres and handed down on 20 March 1952, was unanimous.

== High Court of Parliament ==
The response of Malan's government was immediate: the Prime Minister immediately declared the decision unacceptable, that he refused to abide by it, and that he would take steps to have it overturned. In April 1952 T. E. Dönges introduced the High Court of Parliament Bill, which would constitute the members of Parliament into a High Court with the power to review and overturn any ruling of the Appellate Division declaring an act of Parliament to be invalid. This court was described as a "court of law"; it would have a "Judicial Committee" of ten members which could make recommendations, but the decision of the "court" would be determined by a majority vote of members present.

Dönges, in introducing the bill, argued that it would restore the power of the "sovereign will of the electorate" to determine which laws were valid, and would relieve the Appellate Division of accusations of political bias. J. G. N. Strauss of the opposition denounced the bill as establishing a "political court [...] a bogus court set up in order to express the will of the Caucus of the National Party". The bill was attacked in the English-language press, with the Cape Times calling it "an insult to the intelligence of the judiciary". It even met with opposition from a number of prominent Nationalists.

Despite the opposition, the High Court of Parliament Bill was forced through Parliament. It was passed by the House of Assembly on 15 May 1952 and by the Senate on 27 May. A petition asking the Governor-General to withhold assent was rejected and the bill was assented to on 3 June. The Speaker of the House of Assembly was nominated as President of the High Court of Parliament, and he appointed a Judicial Committee of six government members and four opposition members, with C. R. Swart, the Minister of Justice, as chairman. The opposition members resigned before the first meeting of the committee on 21 July 1952. After three days of hearings the committee recommended the reversal of the Appellate Division's ruling and the validation of the Separate Representation of Voters Act. The High Court of Parliament, which consisted only of Nationalist members of Parliament due to an opposition boycott, approved this recommendation on 27 August.

Meanwhile, the plaintiffs from the first Harris case returned to the ordinary courts to challenge the validity of the High Court of Parliament Act. On 29 August the Cape Provincial Division ruled that the act had the effect of altering the entrenched clauses, and that as it had not been passed by a two-thirds majority in joint session it was invalid. The government's appeal, under the title of Minister of the Interior v Harris, was heard in the Appellate Division on 27–29 October, and on 13 November the court handed down a unanimous decision upholding the ruling of the Cape court.

The court ruled that the existence of the entrenched clauses in the South Africa Act necessarily implied that those protected by the clauses had the right to have any law affecting them tested for validity by a court ("ubi jus ibi remedium"). Parliament, therefore, could not remove this power from the courts of law, and the High Court of Parliament was not a court of law but rather Parliament functioning under another name. As such, it had only the powers given to it by the South Africa Act, and these did not include the power to amend the entrenched clauses without a two-thirds majority in a joint sitting.

This was the height of the constitutional crisis. A general election was due to be held in 1953; if the government refused to accept the rulings of the Appellate Division and conducted the election on the basis of separate representation for white and coloured voters, the system of government could be imperilled. The officials responsible for voter registration would be forced to follow either the government's instructions and risk an interdict from the courts, or to follow the court's ruling and risk sanctions from the administration. There was the possibility that the courts could invalidate the entire election in the Cape Province and therefore the existence of the Parliament elected in 1953.

The government, therefore, while continuing to insist that the court's rulings were wrong, accepted them. The elections were held on 15 April 1953 with coloured voters in the Cape voting alongside white voters. Despite this, the National Party was returned in government with a larger majority: 94 seats out of 156, as opposed to 79 seats out of 153 in 1948.

== Packing of the Senate ==
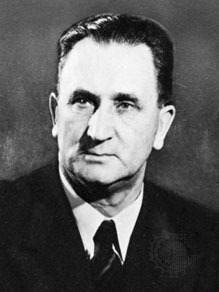
J. G. Strijdom, Prime Minister from 1954 to 1958.

During 1953 and 1954, the National Party tried to re-validate the Separate Representation of Voters Act by convincing enough opposition members to support it to obtain a two-thirds majority; this effort was not successful. In 1955 the new Prime Minister J. G. Strijdom adopted a new plan: the Senate (the upper house of Parliament) would be packed with National Party members to ensure the government would have the necessary two-thirds majority in a joint sitting.

As originally constituted by the South Africa Act, the Senate consisted of forty senators. Eight were nominated by the Governor-General, and thus effectively by the government of the day. For each province eight senators were elected by an electoral college consisting of the members of the House of Assembly representing that province and the members of the provincial council. These elections were conducted by the single transferable vote (STV) system of proportional representation. In 1936 the Representation of Natives Act added four senators indirectly elected to represent black people. In 1949 another four were added to represent the territory of South West Africa. In 1955, then, there were 26 senators supporting the government and 21 supporting the opposition (and one vacant seat).

The Senate Act, 1955 reconstituted the Senate along new lines and expanded it to eighty-nine members. The number of nominated senators was doubled to sixteen. The number of elected senators was increased to be, for each province, one-fifth of the size of that province's electoral college, with a minimum of eight senators per province; so the Cape Province had twenty-two Senators, the Transvaal twenty-seven, and the other two provinces eight each. The four Senators elected under the Representation of Natives Act and four representing South-West Africa remained. The Senate Act also changed the system for electing provincial senators from STV to simple majority voting, meaning that the majority party in each electoral college could choose all the senators for that province. The result was that the National Party was able to control seventy-seven Senatorial seats: the sixteen nominated by the Governor-General, the fifty-seven elected for the Cape, Transvaal and the Orange Free State, and the four representing South-West Africa.

With the new Senate, the National Party commanded a two-thirds majority in a joint sitting, and thus was able to pass the South Africa Act Amendment Act, 1956. This act declared the original Separate Representation of Voters Act to be valid, and repealed the parts of section 35 of the South Africa Act entrenching the Cape franchise as well as the parts of section 152 entrenching section 35. (There remained one unrelated entrenched clause guaranteeing the equality of the English and Afrikaans languages.)

The government's opponents returned to the courts to have this new act also declared invalid, arguing that the Senate Act was passed as part of a deliberate scheme to circumvent the entrenched clauses. This time, however, the court disagreed. On 9 November the Appellate Division handed down a decision under the title of Collins v Minister of the Interior in which it ruled that Parliament had the power to alter the composition of the Senate, a power explicitly granted by the South Africa Act, and that its motivation was irrelevant. The Senate Act was therefore valid, and thus a joint sitting of the House of Assembly and the reconstituted Senate had the power to amend the entrenched clauses.

To ensure its success, the government had also passed the Appellate Division Quorum Act, 1955, expanding the Appellate Division to eleven judges, thus allowing the appointment of six new judges presumed to support the Nationalist position. This proved to have been unnecessary, as only one judge, the notoriously liberal Oliver Schreiner, dissented from the ruling.

== Later developments ==
Separate representatives for coloured voters were first elected in the general election of 1958. Even this limited representation did not last, being ended from 1970 by the Separate Representation of Voters Amendment Act, 1968. Instead, all coloured adults were given the right to vote for the Coloured Persons Representative Council, which had limited legislative powers. The council was in turn dissolved in 1980. In 1984 a new constitution introduced the Tricameral Parliament in which coloured voters elected the House of Representatives.

In 1960, a new Senate Act reduced the size of the Senate and restored the single transferable vote system of election of the provincial senators. In 1961 South Africa became a republic under a new constitution; this constitution repealed the now-unnecessary High Court of Parliament Act.

In 1994, with the end of apartheid, a new constitution was introduced which guarantees the right to vote for all adult citizens. This right, along with many other rights, is entrenched in the constitution. The Constitutional Court has the explicit power to invalidate acts of Parliament that are unconstitutional.
