= President of the Senate of South Africa =

Presiding officer of the former lower house of the Parliament of South Africa

- Incumbent; None
- Senate of South Africa
- Style: Honourable President
- Type: Presiding officer of the upper house in a bicameral legislature
- Residence: Cape Town
- Appointer: Elected by members of the Senate
- Formation: 1 November 1910
- First holder: Francis William Reitz
- Final holder: Kobie Coetsee
- Abolished: 4 February 1997

The president of the Senate presided over the Senate of South Africa, the upper house of the Parliament of South Africa. The president was chosen from among the senators at its first sitting following a general election and whenever the office was vacant. The president acted as a "referee", taking charge of debates to make sure that the senators could participate freely while keeping to the rules. The president also had managerial duties to ensure that Senate runs smoothly. Each political party in the Senate elected a chief whip to run its affairs. The presiding officers, the chief whips, and the leader of government business (the person appointed by the Cabinet to liaise with Parliament) together decided on the programme of work.

The president of the Senate had a dormant commission to become acting State President of South Africa when there was a vacancy in that office, which was often the case, especially between 1967 and 1979.

The Senate was abolished for the first time in 1980, with effect from 1 January 1981, during a process of constitutional reform, and replaced with the President's Council. The Senate was briefly reestablished under the 1993 interim constitution. The Senate was abolished for the second and final time under the 1997 constitution. The office of president of the Senate was succeeded by the office of chairperson of the National Council of Provinces.

== List of presidents (1910–1980 and 1994–1997) ==
No.	Portrait	Name (Birth–Death)	Term of office			Political party
No.	Portrait	Name (Birth–Death)	Took office	Left office	Time in office	Political party
Presidents of the First Senate (1910–1980)
1		Francis William Reitz (1844–1934)	1 November 1910	10 March 1921	10 years, 129 days	South African Party
2		H. C. van Heerden (1862–1933)	11 March 1921	30 June 1929	8 years, 111 days	South African Party
3		R. A. Kerr	19 July 1929	16 January 1930	181 days	National Party
4		Christiaan Andries van Niekerk (1874–1966)	17 January 1930	18 January 1940	10 years, 1 day	National Party (until 1934)
		Christiaan Andries van Niekerk (1874–1966)	17 January 1930	18 January 1940	10 years, 1 day	United Party (from 1934)
5		François Stephanus Malan (1871–1941)	19 January 1940	31 December 1941 (Died in office)	1 year, 346 days	United Party
6		Philippus Arnoldus Myburgh (1880–1946)	12 January 1942	31 December 1945	3 years, 353 days	United Party
7		Pieter Jurie Wessels (1878–1958)	18 January 1946	5 August 1948	2 years, 200 days	United Party
(4)		Christiaan Andries van Niekerk (1874–1966)	6 August 1948	19 January 1961	12 years, 166 days	National Party
8		Jozua François Naudé (1889–1969)	20 January 1961	31 May 1969 (Died in office)	8 years, 131 days	National Party
9		Johannes de Klerk (1903–1979)	6 June 1969	January 1976	6 years, 6 months	National Party
10		Marais Viljoen (1915–2007)	23 January 1976	18 June 1979	3 years, 146 days	National Party
11		Jimmy Kruger (1917–1987)	19 June 1979	31 December 1980	1 year, 195 days	National Party
Post abolished (1 January 1981 – 20 May 1994)
President of the Second Senate (1994–1997)
12		Kobie Coetsee (1931–2000)	20 May 1994	4 February 1997	2 years, 260 days	National Party

== See also ==
- Senate of South Africa
- National Council of Provinces
