= 1955 South African Senate election =

- 25 November 1955

67 of 89 seats in the Senate 45 seats needed for a majority
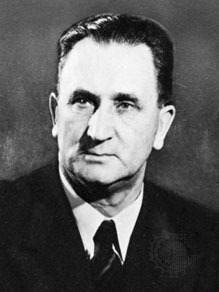

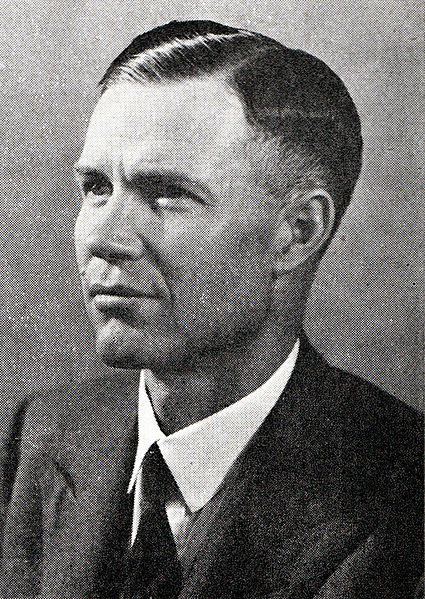
	First party	Second party
Leader	J. G. Strijdom	Koos Strauss
Party	National	United
Last election	11 seats	15 seats
Seats won	77	8
Seat change	▲66	▼7
Percentage	86.52%	8.99%
- Seat distribution of the Senate after the election

The 1955 election for the sixth Senate of South Africa occurred because of the desire of National Party Prime Minister Johannes Strijdom to amend one of the entrenched clauses in the Constitution, to separate Coloured voters from whites. However, since his party did not have the constitutionally required two-thirds majority in a joint session of both houses of Parliament, it was decided to alter the composition and electoral system for the Senate, to enable the Separate Representation of Voters Act 1951 to be validated. Consequently, Strijdom had the Senate Act 1955 passed to amend the constitution.

Instead of each province electing eight Senators, by proportional representation, the new system required provincial representatives to be selected by a first past the post election in the Electoral College. The effect of this was to enable the majority group from each province (NP in all the provinces, except for Natal) to secure all the seats available. In addition, Cape Province and Transvaal had their representation increased to 22 and 27 seats respectively. The number of Senators nominated by the Governor-General was doubled from eight to sixteen. The representation of South-West Africa and black voters was unchanged.

Another change made in 1955 was to reduce Senatorial terms from ten years to five. The size of the Senate rose from 44 to 89 (increased to 90 in 1957 when a nominated Senator was added based on section 7 of the Separate Representation of Voters Act, 1951 to represent the coloured population of the Cape Province for a fixed term until 1962).
