= 1974 South African Senate election =

- 30 May 1974

44 of 54 seats in the Senate 28 seats needed for a majority
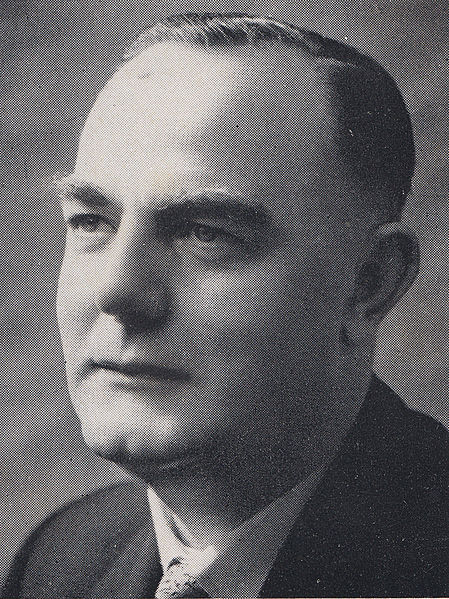

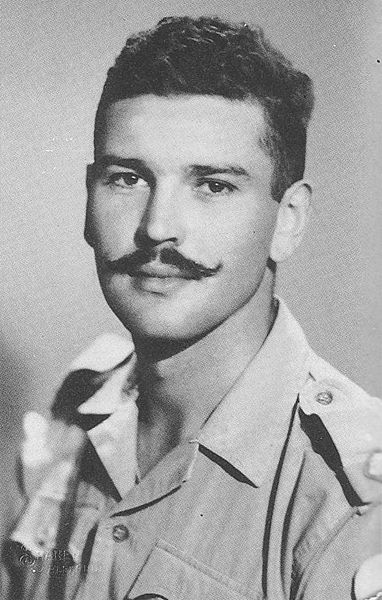
	First party	Second party
Leader	B. J. Vorster	De Villiers Graaff
Party	National	United
Last election	41 seats	13 seats
Seats won	42	12
Seat change	▲1	▼1
Percentage	77.78%	22.22%
- Seat composition in the Senate after the election

The election for the tenth Senate of South Africa took place on May 30, 1974. The result was a victory for the ruling National Party, winning 32 out of the 44 elected seats and 42 out of the total 54 seats. This was the final election for the Senate before it was abolished in 1980 and replaced by the President's Council, an advisory body to the State President designed to draft a new constitution that would allow more political participation to the colored and Indian populations in South Africa.

According to section 29(2)(b) of the 1961 constitution, "at least one of the two senators nominated from each province under this section shall be thoroughly acquainted, by reason of official experience or otherwise, with the interests of the coloured population in the province for which the said senator is nominated".
