= Kobie Coetsee =

South African politician (1931–2000)

Hendrik Jacobus Coetsee

President of the Senate
- In office 20 May 1994 – 4 February 1997
- President: Nelson Mandela
- Preceded by: New office
- Succeeded by: Mosiuoa Lekota (as Chairman of the National Council of Provinces)

Minister of Defence
- In office 1 April 1993 – 11 May 1994
- Preceded by: Gene Louw
- Succeeded by: Joe Modise

Minister of Justice
- In office 7 October 1980 – 31 March 1993
- Preceded by: Alwyn Schlebusch
- Succeeded by: Dullah Omar

Personal details
- Born: 19 April 1931 Ladybrand, Orange Free State, South Africa
- Died: 29 July 2000 (aged 69) Bloemfontein, Free State, South Africa
- Citizenship: South African citizenship
- Party: National Party
- Spouse: Helena Elizabeth Malan (1956–2000)
- Children: 5 children – 2 sons and 3 daughters
- Education: University of the Orange Free State

Hendrik Jacobus Coetsee (19 April 1931 – 29 July 2000), known as Kobie Coetsee, was a South African lawyer, National Party politician and administrator as well as a negotiator during the country's transition to universal democracy.

== Biography ==
Born on 19 April 1931 in Ladybrand, Orange Free State, Union of South Africa a small agricultural town in the province of Orange Free State (now the province of Free State), he studied law at the University of the Orange Free State and qualified as an attorney. In 1968, Coetsee won the Bloemfontein West seat in the House of Assembly, vacated by J. J. Fouche, who became State President. P. W. Botha appointed him in 1978 as Deputy Minister for Defence and National Intelligence and, in 1980, to the powerful position of Justice Minister. The portfolio of Prisons was added to his responsibilities.

On 12 October 1978, Coetsee became Deputy Minister of Defence and National Security. He reorganised National Intelligence after the Information Scandal and adjusted the national service to make sure that people would not suffer financial loss or travel unnecessarily while doing their military service. Coetsee was appointed as Minister of Justice on 7 October 1980. He changed the legal system by introducing the small claims court and pioneering the Matrimonial Property Act in 1984. This act had an important effect on the status of married women and introduced the accrual system of sharing property between spouses. Coetsee also contributed to the process that made community service an alternative option to being jailed and did away with racially specific commissioners' courts. He was serious about legal reform and in April 1986, he asked for a legal commission to investigate the role of the courts in protecting group and individual rights, after which a report on human and group rights had to be drawn up. He also walked the Indemnity Act through parliament, ensuring that those who took part in political negotiations after the unbanning of the African National Congress (ANC) would receive temporary immunity.

After the first non-racial democratic elections in South Africa in 1994, he was elected president of the Senate (which was later renamed the National Council of Provinces), although the ANC had a comfortable majority in this chamber of parliament as well. He kept that position until 1997.

== Meetings with the ANC ==
A series of meetings between him and the imprisoned Nelson Mandela began in 1985. In 1985, he was elected provincial leader of the Orange Free State NP. From 1990 on, he participated in the negotiations between the NP-government and the ANC. In 1993 he also took over the defence portfolio from Roelf Meyer until the elections of 1994.

A Fast Attack Craft of the South African Navy was named after him.

Kobie Coetsee married Helena Elizabeth Malan on 6 October 1956 and was a father of two sons and three daughters. He died of a heart attack on 29 July 2000, in Bloemfontein.

Political offices
Preceded by Gene Louw	Minister of Defence (South Africa); 1 April 1993 – 11 May 1994	Succeeded by Joe Modise
