= 1948 South African Senate election =

- 28 July 1948

36 of 44 seats in the Senate 23 seats needed for a majority
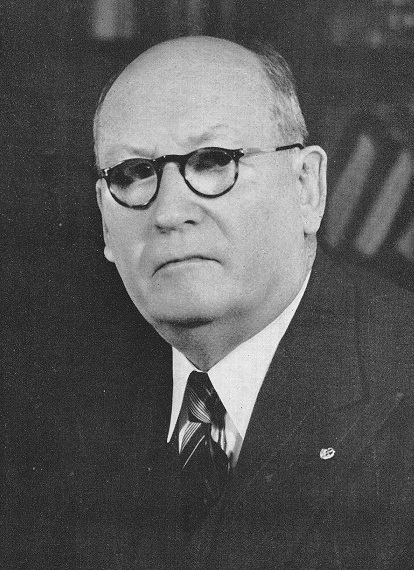

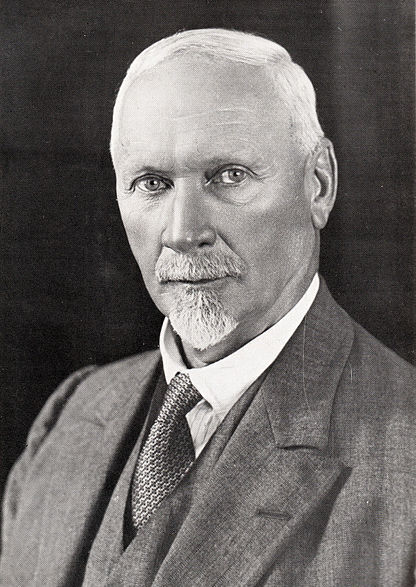
	First party	Second party
Leader	D. F. Malan	Jan Smuts
Party	Reunited National	United
Last election	New party	20 seats
Seats won	11	15
Seat change	N/A	▼5
Percentage	25%	34.09%
- Seat distribution in the Senate after the election

For the fifth Senate of South Africa, the eight nominated Senators were appointed on July 28, 1948 and the Electoral Colleges met in the provincial capitals the following day. At the end of this process the government had 22 supporters (Reunited National Party 11, Afrikaner Party 2, Independent 1 and the 8 nominated Senators) and the opposition 21 (United Party 15, Labour Party 3, and Native Representatives 3). The fourth Native Representative seat was vacant.

The South West Africa Affairs Amendment Act 1949 added four additional members to the Senate, of whom two were to be elected, and two nominated by the Governor-General. The elected Senators were chosen by an Electoral College, composed of the members of South-West Africa's Legislative Assembly and the six members of the House of Assembly representing the territory.

Of the nominated Senators, one was to be selected mainly on the ground of his "thorough acquaintance, by reason of his official experience or otherwise, with the reasonable wants and wishes or the coloured races of the territory". All four Senators chosen on 29 September 1950 were National Party supporters.
