= 1910 South African Senate election =

Party	South African	Orangia Unie	Het Volk
Party	Unionist	Constitutionalist	Progressive
- Composition of the Senate after the election

The first election for the South African Senate took place as a result of the creation of the Union of South Africa through the South Africa Act 1909. The Act included special provisions for the selection of the first elected Senators. The Union Parliament was prohibited from changing the arrangements for the Senate during its first ten years.

The First Senate included eight Senators from each province. They were elected for a ten-year term by the members serving during the final session of the legislatures of each of the four colonies which joined the Union of South Africa. The election was by a form of the single transferable vote. The remaining eight seats were filled, by appointment (also for ten-year terms) by the Governor-General-in-Council (in effect by General Louis Botha's first Union government). Section 24 of the South Africa Act 1909 provided that, of the nominated Senators,

One-half of their number shall be selected on the ground mainly of their thorough acquaintance, by reason of their official experience or otherwise, with the reasonable wants and wishes of the coloured races in South Africa.

Casual vacancies in the representation of the provinces, in the First Senate only, were filled by an electoral college composed of the members of the relevant Provincial Council. New Senators, elected in this way, held the seat for the residue of the ten-year term. Nominated Senators, appointed to fill vacancies, received a ten-year term and did not have to vacate their seats at the end of the term for the provincial representatives.

The composition, by party, of the provincial representatives in the First Senate included 18 representatives of the three colonial governing parties (six each from the South African Party of the Cape, Orangia Unie of the Orange River Colony and Het Volk of the Transvaal, all of which merged to form the South African Party on November 21, 1910), eight Independent Senators from Natal (which did not have a party system before the Union), and six Senators from the opposition parties (two each from the Unionist Party of the Cape, the Constitutional Party of Orange River Colony and the Progressive Party of Transvaal, all of which merged to form the Unionist Party on May 31, 1910).
