= United Party (South Africa) =

1934–1977 political party

United National South African Party Verenigde Suid-Afrikaanse Nasionale Party (Afrikaans)
- Abbreviation: UP
- Leader: J. B. M. Hertzog; Jan Smuts; J. G. N. Strauss; De Villiers Graaff
- Founded: 1934
- Dissolved: 1977
- Preceded by: National Party; South African Party
- Merged into: New Republic Party
- Ideology: Classical liberalism Conservatism; Pro-Commonwealth; Constitutional monarchism Coloured people's rights
- Political position: Centre-right

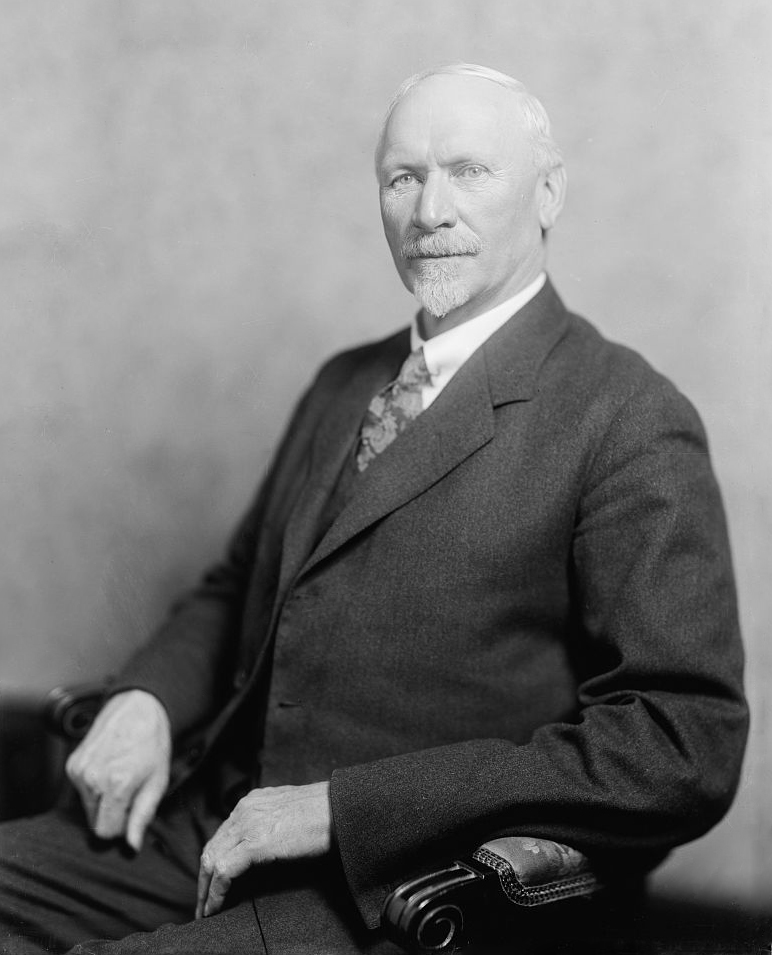
Jan Smuts, the last United Party Prime Minister (1919–1924, 1939–1948)

The United National South African Party (Afrikaans: Verenigde Suid-Afrikaanse Nasionale Party) commonly the United Party (UP) (Afrikaans: Verenigde Party, VP) was a South African political party that was the ruling party from its formation in 1934 until 1948. Formed from the parties of Prime Ministers J. B. M. Hertzog and Jan Smuts, the United Party bridged white English-speakers, Afrikaners and Coloureds. It was considered more liberal on race relations than the National Party, which strongly supported the preservation of white supremacy. The United Party lost the 1948 general election to the National Party which subsequently implemented apartheid. The United Party never held power again and dissolved in 1977, with remnants forming the New Republic Party and other smaller groups.

== Formation ==
The United Party was formed by a merger of the majority of Prime Minister J. B. M. Hertzog's National Party with the rival South African Party of Jan Smuts, along with remnants of the Unionist Party. Its full name was the United National South African Party, but it was generally called the "United Party". The party drew support from several different parts of South African society, including white English-speakers, Afrikaners and Coloureds.

Hertzog led the party until 1939, when he refused to commit South Africa to the British Empire's war effort against Nazi Germany after World War II broke out. Most Afrikaners were hostile to the British and sympathetic towards Nazi Germany, and Hertzog felt that supporting Britain during the conflict would be unacceptable to Afrikaner opinion. He also claimed to not see much benefit for South Africa taking part in a war that Hertzog claimed was essentially a European affair. The majority of the United Party caucus were of a different mind, however, and Hertzog resigned. Smuts succeeded him and led the party and the country throughout World War II and the immediate post-war years.

== Decline ==
Smuts and the United Party lost the 1948 election to the National Party. It never held power again. J. G. N. Strauss succeeded Smuts in 1950, and was in turn replaced by Sir de Villiers Graaff in 1956 until 1977. Attrition characterised his leadership years, as the party slowly declined because of electoral gerrymandering, changes to South Africa's voting laws, including the removal of the 'Coloureds' – South Africans of mixed ancestry, who had been staunch United Party supporters – from the electoral rolls, and defections to other parties such as the Progressive Party, which was formed in 1959 by liberal former UP members that sought a stronger opposition to apartheid. Despite this, the party remained relatively stable until the 1970s.

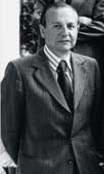
Harry Schwarz Leader of the anti-apartheid "Young Turks"

=== National Conservative Party ===
The National Conservative Party (Afrikaans: Nasionale Konserwatiewe Party) existed in South Africa between 1954 and 1957. It was led by Bailey Bekker, after he and others split from the United Party. Five United Party members were expelled after the 1953 parliamentary session, including Bekker and Abraham Jonker, after they had criticised the party's approach to the Cape Qualified Franchise which allowed some Cape Coloureds to vote in South African elections alongside Whites. They believed the party should compromise with the government and allow a separate electoral roll. They were conservative in outlook and regarded the United Party's new leader JGN Strauss as taking it leftwards. They, and two other members, founded the National Conservative Party in 1954. The party did not prosper and dissolved in 1957 before the next election, with its members joining the National Party or rejoining the United Party, or retiring from politics.

=== Schwarz breakaway ===
There was much division in the party, between liberals and conservatives. Divisions came to a head in 1972 when Harry Schwarz, leader of the liberal "Young Turks" within the party, wrestled the leadership of the party in the Transvaal from Marais Steyn. His victory was a visible sign of strength from the liberals within the party. On 4 January 1974, he met with Mangosuthu Buthelezi and signed a five-point plan for racial peace in South Africa, which came to be known as the Mahlabatini Declaration of Faith. It was the first occasion in apartheid South Africa's history where the principles of peaceful transition and equality had been enshrined in a document which had been jointly signed by acknowledged black and white political leaders in South Africa. The declaration, however provoked an angry response from the conservative "Old Guard" in the party, including the party's leader.

In 1975 Harry Schwarz and three other Members of Parliament (MPs) were expelled from the United Party. Further resignations followed, which included two senators, ten members of the Transvaal Provincial Council, 14 out of the 36 Johannesburg City Councillors and four Randburg City Councillors. This made it the official opposition in the Transvaal Provincial Council. They formed the Reform Party which elected Schwarz as leader. Schwarz's breakaway led to the demise of the United Party and realigned opposition politics in South Africa. The Reform Party soon merged with the Progressive Party to form the Progressive Reform Party (PRP).

In 1977, after merging with the Democratic Party, which had been formed by moderate NP dissidents, the United Party was renamed the New Republic Party. A significant number of its parliamentarians refused to remain with the renamed party. Some joined the anti-apartheid PRP (now called the Progressive Federal Party). Six MPs were expelled from the United Party for refusing to accept the plan to form the NRP and formed the South African Party which joined the ruling National Party three years later. Elections in late 1977 left the New Republic Party gutted, with only 10 parliamentary seats, down from the 41 held by the United Party.

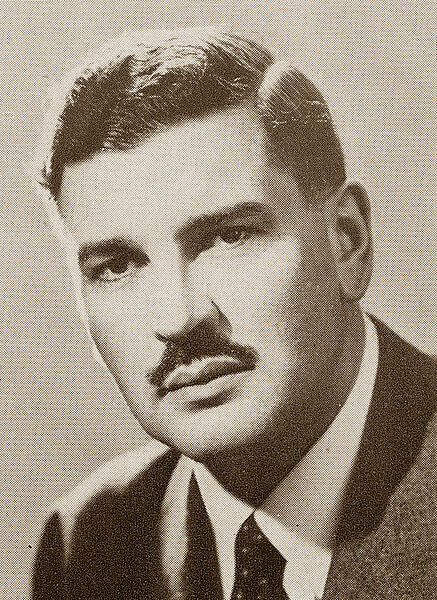
Sir De Villiers Graaff, leader of the United Party, 1960

== Political position and legacy ==
The United Party did not articulate a position on race relations and tacitly supported segregation in general, though Smuts suggested that if black politicians promote "civilised" conduct, black South Africans might someday share power with the white minority. The lack of clear policy on race relations contributed to the United Party's loss in the 1948 election. The United Party was considered more liberal on the issue than the Nationalist Party, which supported the preservation of white supremacy at all costs.

The United Party was against apartheid as a system, but also favoured the continuation of white minority rule, akin to the political arrangements in Rhodesia at the time. During the late 1960s, the party tried to gain support by its resistance to the National Party's politics on giving land to the Bantustans, insisting on a single citizenship for all South Africans. By the 1970s, the UP advocated federalism and a gradual retreat from official segregation and discrimination.

The party supported links with the Commonwealth of Nations, and unsuccessfully campaigned against the establishment of a republic in the whites-only referendum held on 5 October 1960.

By the late 1970s, the breakaway and successor groups of the United Party – the Progressive Federal Party, New Republic Party and South African Party – were more or less committed to a multiracial federation as a solution to the racial question. The ruling National Party's reform program under PW Botha initially attracted some liberal support while provoking divisions within its ranks. By 1987, the NRP was in decline and its base absorbed by parties formed by NP dissidents; these merged with the PFP in 1989 to form the Democratic Party which is now the Democratic Alliance, thus reuniting the currents that originated in the United Party.

== Electoral history ==
=== Presidential elections ===
Election	Party candidate	Votes	%	Result
State President elected by a joint sitting of both houses of Parliament
1961	Supported Henry Fagan (NU)	71	33.81%	Lost ✗
1967	Pieter Voltelyn Graham van der Byl	52	24.19%	Lost ✗

=== House of Assembly elections ===
Election	Party leader	Votes	%	Seats	+/–	Position	Result
1938	J. B. M. Hertzog	446,032	53.81%	111 / 150	▼25	▲1st	Majority government
1943	Jan Smuts	435,297	49.68%	89 / 150	▼22	1st	Majority government
1948	Jan Smuts	524,230	49.16%	65 / 150	▼24	▼2nd	Opposition
1953	J. G. N. Strauss	576,474	47.65%	57 / 156	▼8	2nd	Opposition
1958	De Villiers Graaff	503,648	43.57%	53 / 156	▼4	2nd	Opposition
1961	De Villiers Graaff	288,217	35.88%	49 / 156	▼4	2nd	Opposition
1966	De Villiers Graaff	486,629	37.37%	39 / 166	▼10	2nd	Opposition
1970	De Villiers Graaff	561,647	37.23%	47 / 166	▲8	2nd	Opposition
1974	De Villiers Graaff	363,459	32.70%	41 / 171	▼6	2nd	Opposition

=== Senate elections ===
Election	Party leader	%	Seats	+/–	Position	Result
1939	J. B. M. Hertzog	45.45%	20 / 44	▲20	▲1st	Governing minority
1948	Jan Smuts	34.09%	15 / 44	▼5	1st	Opposition
1955	J. G. N. Strauss	8.99%	8 / 89	▼7	▼2nd	Opposition
1960	De Villiers Graaff	27.78%	15 / 54	▲7	2nd	Opposition
1965	De Villiers Graaff	24.53%	13 / 53	▼2	2nd	Opposition
1970	De Villiers Graaff	24.07%	13 / 54	Steady	2nd	Opposition
1974	De Villiers Graaff	22.22%	12 / 54	▼1	2nd	Opposition

== See also ==
- List of political parties in South Africa
