= National Party (South Africa) =

1914–1997 South African political party

National Party Nasionale Party
- Logo (1977—1993)
- Abbreviation: NP
- Leader: J. B. M. Hertzog (1914–1934); D. F. Malan (1934–1953); J. G. Strijdom (1953–1958); H. F. Verwoerd (1958–1966); B. J. Vorster (1966–1978); P. W. Botha (1978–1989); F. W. de Klerk (1989–1997)
- Founded: 1 July 1914 (112 years ago)
- Dissolved: 8 August 1997 (29 years ago)
- Split from: South African Party
- Merged into: United Party (1934–1939)
- Succeeded by: New National Party
- Headquarters: Cape Town, Cape Province, South Africa
- Ideology: 1914–1948: Afrikaner nationalism Anti-British sentiment Afrikaner minority interests Conservatism; Republicanism; Scientific racism White supremacy 1948–1990: Afrikaner nationalism (Note: Including Christian nationalism); Apartheid; Anti-communism; Anti-British sentiment National conservatism Scientific racism Cultural racism Social conservatism White supremacy Republicanism; Volkscapitalisme; 1990–1997: Civic nationalism South African nationalism Conservative liberalism Christian democracy Liberal conservatism Neoliberalism
- Political position: 1914–1990: Far-right; 1990–1997: Centre-right (Note: "The National Party was long dedicated to policies of apartheid and white supremacy, but by the early 1990s it had moved toward sharing power with South Africa's Black majority. [...] In 1982, much of the party's right wing broke off in opposition to the granting of limited political rights to Coloureds (those of mixed descent) and Asians (primarily Indians) and formed the Conservative Party. Under de Klerk's leadership from 1989, the National Party began taking steps away from apartheid and toward a constitutional arrangement that would allow political representation to the country's Black African majority. To this end, many repressive laws were repealed and Black antiapartheid political organizations were legalised.")
- Religion: Dutch Reformed Church in South Africa
- Bantustan affiliates: National Party of Venda; Ciskei National Independence Party; Transkei National Independence Party; Democratic Turnhalle Alliance; Ximoko Party; Inkatha Freedom Party; Dikwankwetla Party of South Africa; Lebowa People's Party; Damara Council; Rehoboth Volksparty; Seoposengwe Party
- Colours: Orange, white and blue (South African national colours)
- Slogan: South Africa First "Suid-Afrika Eerste"
- National Assembly (1994): 82 / 400 (21%)

Election symbol

Party flag

The National Party (Afrikaans: Nasionale Party, NP), also referred to as the Nationalist Party or Nats by its opponents, was a political party in South Africa from 1914 to 1997, which was responsible for the implementation of apartheid rule. The party was an Afrikaner ethnic nationalist party, founded in 1914 to protect the interests of Afrikaners against perceived British cultural dominance following the Union of South Africa but later became a stalwart promoter and enactor of white supremacy, for which it is best known. It first became the governing party of the country in 1924. During the 1929-1939 Great Depression it merged with its rival, the South African Party (SAP), and a splinter faction, the Purified National Party, became the official opposition. Further fragmentation during World War II was reversed through the creation of the Reunited National Party, which rose to power in 1948 and revived the name "National Party". With the party governing South Africa from 4 June 1948 until 9 May 1994, the country for the bulk of this time was only a de jure or partial democracy, as from 1958 onwards non-white people were barred from voting. In 1990, it began to style itself as simply a South African civic nationalist party, and after the fall of apartheid in 1994, attempted to become a moderate conservative one. The party's reputation was damaged irreparably by perpetrating apartheid, and it rebranded itself as the New National Party in 1997 before eventually dissolving in 2005.

Following the 1948 general election, the party as the governing party of South Africa began implementing its policy of racial segregation, known as apartheid (the Afrikaans term for "separateness"). Although White-minority rule and racial segregation were already in existence in South Africa with non-Whites not having voting rights and efforts made to encourage segregation, apartheid intensified the segregation with stern penalties for non-Whites entering into areas designated for Whites-only without having a pass to permit them to do so (known as the pass laws), interracial marriage and sexual relationships were illegal and punishable offences. Black people faced significant restrictions on property rights. After South Africa was condemned by the British Commonwealth for its policies of apartheid, the NP-led government had South Africa leave the Commonwealth, abandon its monarchy led by the British monarch and become an independent republic. The party's system of apartheid was officially labelled a crime against humanity by the United Nations General Assembly on 16 December 1966.

During the 1970s and 1980s, the NP-led white apartheid government faced internal unrest in South Africa along with international pressure for the segregation and discrimination of non-Whites in South Africa after the abolition of the Jim Crow laws in the United States during the mid-1960s. It resulted in policies of granting concessions to the non-White population while still retaining the apartheid system, such as the creation of Bantustans that were autonomous self-governing Black homelands (criticised for several of them being broken up into unconnected pieces and that they were still dominated by the White minority South African government), removing legal prohibitions on interracial marriage, and legalising certain non-White and multiracial political parties (excluding the very popular African National Congress (ANC), which the government still viewed as a terrorist organisation). Those identified as Coloureds and Indian South Africans were granted separate legislatures in 1983 alongside the central legislature that represented Whites to provide them self-government while maintaining apartheid, but no such congress was supplied to the Black population as their self-government was to be provided through the Bantustans. The NP-led government began changing laws affected by the apartheid system that had come under heavy domestic and international condemnation, such as removing the pass laws, granting Blacks full property rights that ended previous significant restrictions on Black land ownership, and the right to form trade unions. Following escalating economic sanctions over apartheid, negotiations between the NP-led government led by P. W. Botha and the outlawed ANC led by then-imprisoned Nelson Mandela began in 1987 with Botha seeking to accommodate the ANC's demands and consider releasing Mandela and legalising the ANC on the condition that it would renounce the use of political violence to attain its aims.

F. W. de Klerk declared in February 1990 the decision to permit the release of Mandela from prison and ending South Africa's ban on the ANC and other anti-apartheid movements. In September 1990 the party opened up its membership to all racial groups and rebranded itself as no longer being an ethnic nationalist party only representing Afrikaners, but would henceforth be a civic nationalist and conservative party representing all South Africans. However, there was significant opposition among hardliner supporters of apartheid that resulted in De Klerk's government responding to them by holding a national referendum on Apartheid in 1992 for the White population alone that asked them if they supported the government's policy to end apartheid and establish elections open to all South Africans: a large majority voted in favour of the government's policy. In the 1994 elections, it expanded its base to include many non-Whites, including significant support from Coloured and Indian South Africans. It participated in the Government of National Unity between 1994 and 1996. In an attempt to distance itself from its past, the party was renamed the New National Party in 1997. The attempt was largely unsuccessful and the new party decided to merge with the ANC.

== Founding and early history ==
The National Party was founded in Bloemfontein in 1914 by Afrikaner nationalists soon after the establishment of the Union of South Africa. Its founding was rooted in disagreements among South African Party politicians, particularly Prime Minister Louis Botha and his first Minister of Justice, J. B. M. Hertzog. After Hertzog began speaking out publicly against the Botha government's "one-stream" policy in 1912, Botha removed him from the cabinet. Hertzog and his followers in the Orange Free State province subsequently moved to establish the National Party to oppose the government by advocating a "two-stream" policy of equal rights for the English and Afrikaner communities. Afrikaner nationalists in the Transvaal and Cape provinces soon followed suit, so that three distinct provincial NP organisations were in existence in time for the 1915 general elections.

The NP first came to power in coalition with the Labour Party in 1924, with Hertzog as Prime Minister. In 1930 the Hertzog government worked to undermine the vote of Coloureds (South Africans of mixed White and non-White ancestry) by granting the right to vote to White women, thus doubling White political power. In 1934, Hertzog agreed to merge his National Party with the rival South African Party of Jan Smuts to form the United Party. A hardline faction of Afrikaner nationalists led by Daniel François Malan refused to accept the merger and maintained a rump National Party called the 'Purified National Party'. The Purified National Party used opposition to South African participation in World War II to stir up anti-British feelings amongst Afrikaners. This led to a reunification of the Purified Nationalists with the faction that had merged with the South African Party; together, they formed the Re-United National Party, which went on to defeat Smuts' United Party in 1948 in a coalition with the much smaller Afrikaner Party. In 1951, the two amalgamated to once again become known simply as the National Party.

== Apartheid program ==
Upon taking power after the 1948 general election, the NP began to implement a program of apartheid – the legal system of political, economic and social segregation of the races intended to maintain and extend political and economic control of South Africa by the White minority. The party's actions made South Africa for the most part a pariah state across the world. Apartheid was officially labelled a crime against humanity by the United Nations General Assembly on 16 December 1966.

In 1959 the Bantu Self-Government Act established so-called Homelands (sometimes pejoratively called Bantustans) for ten different Black tribes. The ultimate goal of the NP was to move all Black South Africans into one of these homelands (although they might continue to work in South Africa as "guest workers"), leaving what was left of South Africa (about 87 per cent of the land area) with what would then be a White majority, at least on paper. As the apartheid government saw the homelands as embryonic independent nations, all Black South Africans were registered as citizens of the homelands, not of the nation as a whole, and were expected to exercise their political rights only in the homelands. Accordingly, the three token parliamentary seats reserved for White representatives of Black South Africans in the Cape Province were scrapped. The other three provinces – Transvaal Province, the Orange Free State Province, and Natal Province had never allowed any Black representation.

Coloureds were removed from the Common Roll of Cape Province in 1953. Instead of voting for the same representatives as White South Africans, they could now vote only for four White representatives to speak for them. Later, in 1968, the Coloureds were disenfranchised altogether. In the place of the four parliamentary seats, a partially elected body was set up to advise the government in an amendment to the Separate Representation of Voters Act. This made the electorate entirely White, as Indian South Africans had never had any representation.

In a move unrecognised by the rest of the world, the former German colony of South West Africa (now Namibia), which South Africa had occupied in World War I, was effectively incorporated into South Africa as a League of Nations mandate, with seven members elected to represent its White citizens in the Parliament of South Africa. The White minority of South West Africa, predominantly Germans and Afrikaners, considered its interests akin to those of the Afrikaners in South Africa and therefore supported the National Party in subsequent elections.

These reforms bolstered the NP politically, as they removed Black and Coloured influence – which was hostile to the NP – from the electoral process and incorporated the pro-nationalist Whites of South-West Africa. The NP increased its parliamentary majority in almost every election between 1948 and 1977.

Numerous segregation laws had been passed before the NP took power in 1948. Among the most significant were the 'Natives Land Act, No 27 of 1913', and the 'Natives (Urban Areas) Act of 1923'. The former made it illegal for Blacks to purchase or lease land from Whites except in reserves, which restricted Black occupancy to less than eight percent of South Africa's land. The latter laid the foundations for residential segregation in urban areas. Apartheid laws passed by the NP after 1948 included the 'Prohibition of Mixed Marriages Act', the 'Immorality Act', the 'Population Registration Act', and the 'Group Areas Act', which prohibited non-white males from being in certain areas of the country (especially at night) unless they were employed there.

== From dominion to republic ==
The NP strongly advocated republicanism, a sentiment rooted in Boer history. Beginning in 1836, waves of Boers began to migrate north from the Cape Colony to live beyond the reach of the British colonial administration. Eventually, the migrating Boers founded three republics in southern Africa: the Natalia Republic, the South African Republic and the Orange Free State. British colonial expansion in the 19th century led to the annexation of the Natalia Republic by Britain and the First and Second Boer Wars, which resulted in the South African Republic and the Orange Free State being annexed into the Empire as well.

Despite Britain's victory in the Second Boer War, Afrikaners resisted British control in southern Africa. In 1914, a group of anti-British Afrikaners led the Maritz rebellion against the Union of South Africa during World War I; two years later, an NP congress called for South Africa to become a republic before changing its mind and deciding that it was too early. The Afrikaner Broederbond, a secret organization founded in 1918 to support the interests of Afrikaners in South Africa, soon became a powerful force in the South African political scene. The Republican Bond was established in the 1930s, and other republican organisations such as the Purified National Party, the Voortrekkers, Noodhulpliga (First-Aid League) and the Federasie van Afrikaanse Kultuurverenigings (Federation of Afrikaans Cultural Organisations) also came into being. There was a widespread outpouring of nationalist sentiment around the 1938 centenary of the Great Trek and the Battle of Blood River. It was seen to signify the perpetuation of white South African culture, and anti-British and pro-republican feelings grew more assertive.

It was obvious in political circles that the Union of South Africa was headed inevitably towards republicanism. Although it remained a Dominion after unification in 1910, the country was granted increased amounts of self-government; indeed, it already had complete autonomy on specific issues. It was agreed in 1910 that the South African government would look after domestic matters but that the country's external affairs would remain British-controlled.

Hertzog's trip to the 1919 Paris Peace Conference was a definite (if failed) attempt to gain independence. In 1926, however, the Balfour Declaration was passed, affording every British dominion within the British Empire equal rank and bestowing upon them their right of the direction of foreign issues. This resulted the following year in the institution of South Africa's first-ever Department of Foreign Affairs. 1931 saw a backtrack as the Statute of Westminster resolved that British Dominions could not have "total" control over their external concerns, but in 1934 the Status and Seals Acts were passed, granting the South African Parliament even greater power than the British government over the Union.

The extreme NP members of the 1930s were known collectively as the Republikeinse Bond. The following organisations, parties and events promoted the Republican ideal in the 1930s:

- The Broederbond
- The Purified National Party
- The FAK
- The Voortrekkers and Noodhulpliga
- The 1938 Great Trek Centenary
- The Reddingsdaadbond
- The Ossewabrandwag
- Pirow's Nuwe Orde (New Order)
- The adjustment to Die Stem and the national flag

=== Daniël François Malan ===
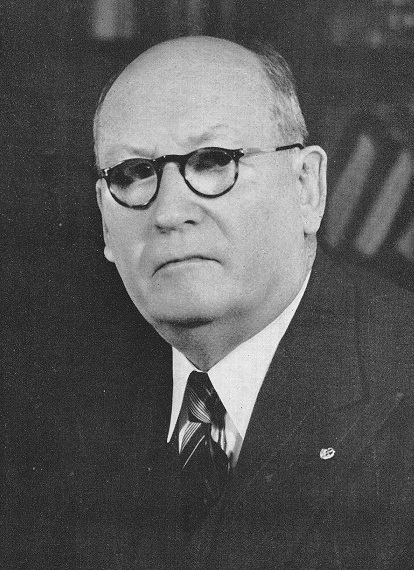
D. F. Malan, leader of the NP from 1934 until 1953

There was some confusion about the republican ideal during the war years. The Herenigde Nasionale Party, with Hertzog its leader, pushed the issue into the background. After Hertzog left the party, however, it became republican. In 1942 and 1944, D. F. Malan introduced a motion in the House of Assembly in favour of the establishment of a republic, but this was defeated.

When the NP came to power in 1948 (making it the first all-Afrikaner cabinet since 1910), there were two uppermost priorities that it was determined to fulfil:

- Find a solution to the racial problem.
- Lead South Africa to independence and republican status.

Between 1948 and 1961, Prime Ministers D. F. Malan, J. G. Strijdom and Hendrik Verwoerd all worked very hard for the latter, implementing a battery of policies and changes in a bid to increase the country's autonomy. Divided loyalty, they felt, was holding South Africa back. They wanted to break the country's ties with the United Kingdom and establish a republic, and many South Africans grew confident that a republic was possible.

Unfortunately for its republicans, the NP was not in a strong parliamentary position. Although it held a majority (only five) of seats, many of these were in rural constituencies, which had far fewer voters than urban constituencies. Malan appealed to many rural voters due to his agricultural policy, meaning black workers relied on white farmers for work, fuelling his quest for a segregated nation. The United Party held a 100,000-vote lead. Consequently, the NP had to rely on the Afrikaner Party's support. It did not, therefore, have the groundswell of public support that it needed to win a referendum, and only when it had that majority on its side could a referendum be held on the republican matter. However, with a small seating majority and a total vote-tally minority, it was impossible for now for Malan and his ardently republican Nats to bring about a republic constitutionally. In the interim, the NP would have to consolidate itself and not antagonise the British.

Many English speakers did not want to break their ties with the United Kingdom. However, in 1949, at the 1949 Commonwealth Prime Ministers' Conference in London (with Malan in attendance), India requested that, despite its newly attained republican status, it remain a member of the British Commonwealth. When this was granted the following year by the London Declaration, It roused much debate in South Africa between the pro-republican NP and the anti-republican UP (under Strauss). It meant that, even if South Africa did become a republic, it did not automatically have to sever all of its ties with the UK and the British Commonwealth. This gained the movement further support from the English-speaking populace, which was less worried about being isolated, and the republican ideal looked closer than ever to being fulfilled.

Although he could not make South Africa a republic, Malan could prepare the country for this eventuality. In his term of office, from 1948 to 1954, Malan took several steps to break ties with the UK:

- The South African Citizenship Act was passed in 1949. Before, South Africans were not citizens but rather subjects of the British Crown, regardless of whether they were permanent residents or had only recently migrated. The 1949 Act established South African citizenship. Before, British citizens needed a mere two years in the country to qualify as South Africans; now, British immigrants were just like any other immigrant: they would have to register and remain in South Africa for five years to become citizens of the country. It was believed that this could well influence a republican referendum. The Act ensured that the British immigrant population would not reduce the Afrikaner majority.
- In 1950, the right of appeal to the British Privy Council in London was terminated under the Privy Council Appeals Act. The Appellate Division of the Supreme Court in Bloemfontein was now South Africa's highest court.
- Malan was a crucial player in the move to get the word "British" taken away from "British Commonwealth". This change was taken as an affirmation of the fact that all member countries were voluntary and equal members.
- In 1951, pro-republican Ernest George Jansen was assigned the post of Governor-General of South Africa. This endorsed the idea of Afrikaner leadership.
- The title of the just-crowned Queen was modified in 1953 from "Elizabeth II, Queen of Great Britain, Ireland and the British Dominions beyond the Seas" to "Elizabeth II, Queen of South Africa". This was meant to indicate that the South African upper house had bequeathed the title upon her.

The 1953 ballot votes saw the NP fortify its position considerably, winning comfortably but still falling well short of the clear majority it sought: it had 94 seats in parliament to the UP's 57 and the Labour Party's five.

=== Hans Strijdom ===
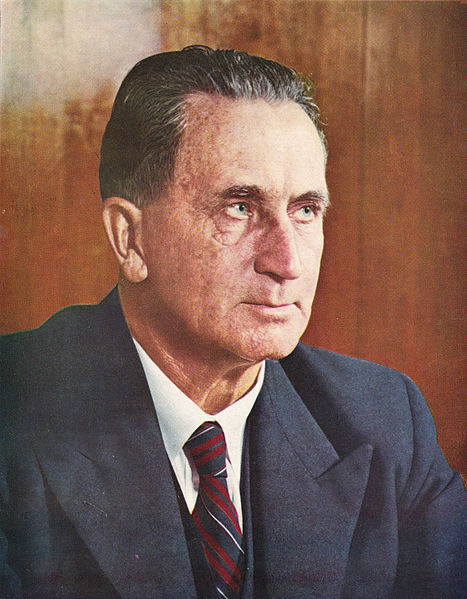
J. G. Strijdom, leader of the NP from 1953 until 1958

Malan retired in 1954 at the age of eighty. The two succession contenders were J. G. Strijdom (Minister of Lands and Irrigation) and Havenga (Minister of Finance). Malan personally preferred the latter and, indeed, recommended him. Malan and Strijdom had clashed frequently over the years, particularly on the question of whether a republican South Africa should be inside or outside the Commonwealth.

Strijdom, however, had the support of Verwoerd and Ben Schoeman, and he was eventually voted in as Prime Minister. Strijdom was a passionate and outspoken Afrikaner and republican who wholeheartedly supported apartheid. He was completely intolerant towards non-Afrikaners and liberal ideas, utterly determined to maintain White rule with zero compromise. Known as the "Lion of the North", Strijdom made few changes to his cabinet and pursued with vigour the policy of apartheid. By 1956, he successfully placed the Coloureds on a separate voters' roll, thus further weakening ties with the Commonwealth and gaining support for the NP.

He also took several other steps to make South Africa less dependent on Britain:

- In 1955, the South African parliament became recognised as the highest authority.
- In 1957, following a motion from Arthur Barlow MP, the flag of the Union of South Africa became the country's only flag; the Union Jack, alongside which the Union Flag had flown since 1928, was flown no longer, to be hoisted only on special occasions.
- Likewise, "Die Stem van Suid-Afrika" (The Call of South Africa) became South Africa's only national anthem and was also translated into English to appease the relevant population. God Save the Queen would be sung only on occasions relating to the UK or the Commonwealth.
- In 1957, the maritime base in Simonstown was reassigned from the command of the British Royal Navy to that of the South African government. The British had occupied Simonstown since 1806.
- In 1958, "OHMS" was replaced by "Official" on all official documents.
- C. R. Swart, another staunch Afrikaner republican, became the new Governor-General.

Anti-republican South Africans recognised the shift and distancing from Britain, and the UP grew increasingly anxious, doing all it could to persuade Parliament to retain Commonwealth links. Strijdom, however, declared that South Africa's participation (or otherwise) in the Commonwealth would be determined only by its best interests.

=== Hendrik Verwoerd ===
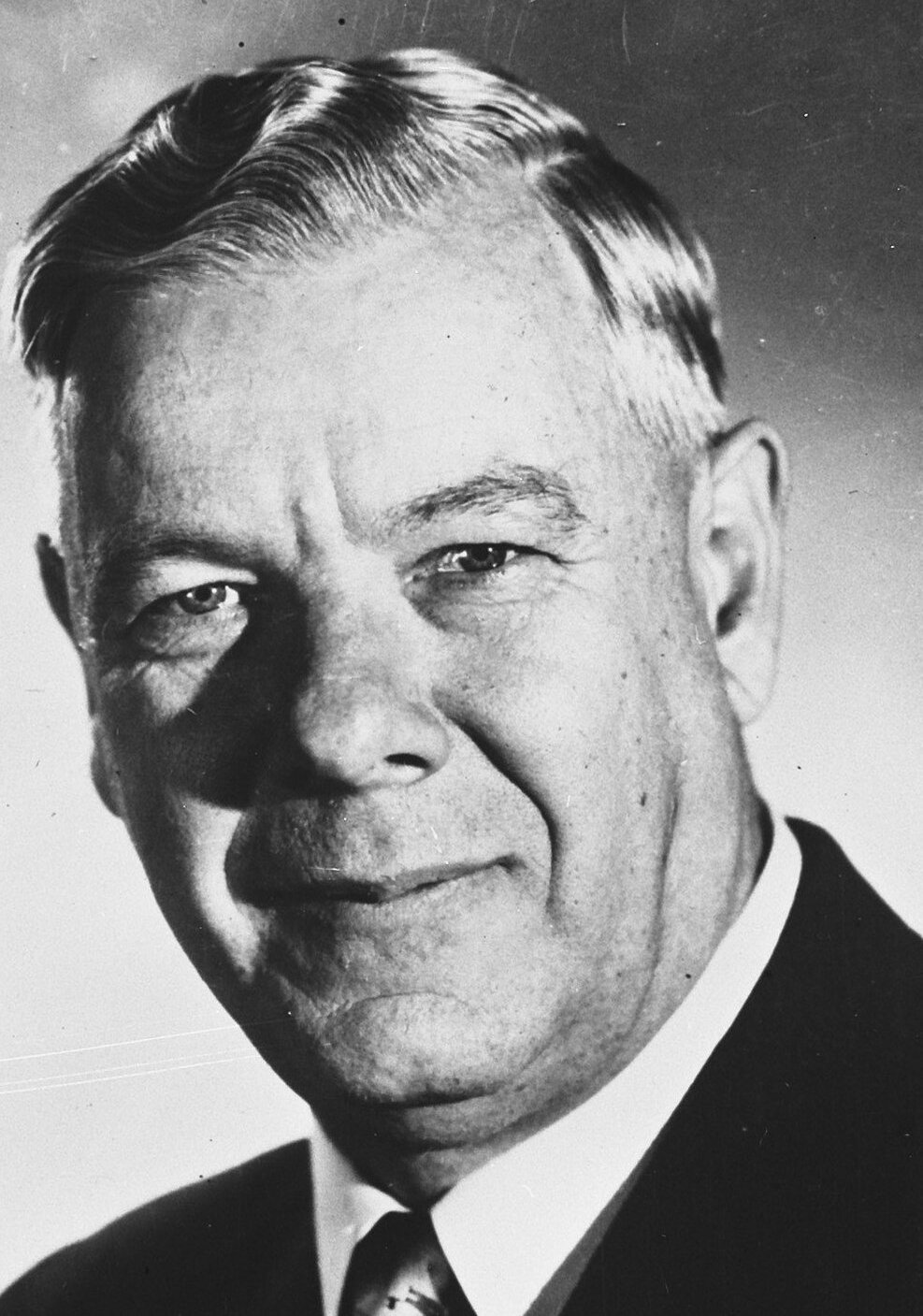

The question of apartheid dominated the 1958 election, and the NP took 55% of the vote, thus winning a clear majority for the first time. When Strijdom died that same year, there was a tripartite succession contest between Swart, Dönges and Verwoerd. The latter, devoted to the cause of a republican South Africa, was the new Prime Minister. Verwoerd, a former Minister of Native Affairs, played a leading role in the institution of the apartheid system. Under his leadership, the NP solidified its control over South African apartheid-era politics.

To gain the support of the English-identified population of South Africa, Verwoerd appointed several English speakers to his cabinet. He also cited the radical political movements elsewhere in Africa as vindication of his belief that White and Black nationalism could not work within the same system. Verwoerd also presented the NP as the party best equipped to deal with the widely perceived threat of communism.

By the end of his term (caused by his assassination), Verwoerd had solidified the NP's domination of South African politics. In the 1966 elections the party won 126 out of the 170 seats in Parliament.

By 1960, however, much of the South African electorate called for withdrawal from the Commonwealth and establishing South Africa as a republic. It was decided that a republican referendum was to be held in October. International circumstances made the referendum a growing necessity. In the aftermath of the World War II, former British colonies in Africa and Asia were gaining independence and publicising the ills of apartheid. Commonwealth members were determined to isolate South Africa.

There were numerous internal factors which had paved the way for and may be viewed as influences on the result:

- Harold Macmillan's "Winds of Change" speech, in which he declared that independence for Black Africans was an inevitability;
- Many Whites were unwilling to give up apartheid and realised that South Africa would have to go for it alone if it was to pursue its racial policies.
- The assertion that economic growth and relaxation of racial tensions could be achieved only through a republic;
- The Sharpeville Massacre;
- The attempted assassination of Verwoerd; and, most importantly,
- The 1960 census revealed more Afrikaners in the country than English, thus almost guaranteeing the NP victory in a republican referendum.

The opposition accused Verwoerd of trying to break from the Commonwealth and the West, thus losing South Africa's trade preferences. The NP, however, launched a vigorously enthusiastic political campaign with widely advertised public meetings. The opposition found it very difficult to fight for the preservation of British links.

There were numerous pro-republican arguments:

- It would link more closely the two European language groups.
- It would eliminate confusion about South Africa's constitutional position.
- The monarchy was essentially British, with no roots in South Africa.
- South Africans desired a home-grown Head of State.
- The Queen of South Africa, living abroad, inherited her title as the United Kingdom's monarch without the assistance or approval of South Africa.
- In a republic, the Head of State would not be another country's ruler but rather the elected representative of the nation, a unifying symbol.
- A republic symbolised a sovereign free, and independent state.
- South Africa could approach its internal problems more realistically since they would be strictly "South African" problems to be solved by South Africans rather than foreign intervention.
- It would clear the misconception amongst many Blacks in South Africa that foreigners had the final say in their affairs.

There were also numerous arguments against the establishment of a republic:

- It could lead to a forced withdrawal from the Commonwealth.
- With the entire world in a state of political unrest, bordering on turmoil, it was dangerous to change South Africa's political status.
- It could lead to isolation from allies.
- A republic would solve none of South Africa's problems; it would only worsen them, especially the racial issue, to which the Commonwealth was increasingly opposed.
- The NP had supposedly not given one good reason for the change.
- The ruling party already had twelve years to bring about national unity but had only driven the two White sects further apart.
- A majority of just one vote could establish a republic. This did not entail unity nor, indeed, democracy.
- Countries did not generally change their form of government unless the present form was inefficient or unstable due to internal strife or hardship. Nothing like this had happened in (White) South Africa, where so many were so content.

On 5 October 1960, 90.5% of the White electorate turned out to vote on the issue. 850,458 (52%) voted in favour of a republic, while 775,878 were against it. The Cape, Orange Free State and Transvaal were all in favour; Natal, a mainly English-speaking province, was not. It was a narrow victory for the republicans. However, a considerable number of Afrikaners did vote against the measure. The few Blacks, Indians and Coloureds allowed to vote were decidedly against the measure.

English speakers who voted for a republic had done so on the condition that their cultural heritage be safeguarded. Many had associated a republic with the survival of the White South Africans. Macmillan's speech illustrated that the British government was no longer prepared to stand by South Africa's racist policies. Nevertheless, the referendum was a significant victory for Afrikaner nationalism as British political and cultural influence waned in South Africa.

However, one question remained after the referendum: would South Africa become a republic outside the Commonwealth (the outcome favoured by the most Afrikaner nationalists)? Withdrawal from the Commonwealth would likely alienate English speakers and damage relations with many other countries. Former British colonies such as India, Pakistan and Ghana were all republics within the Commonwealth, and Verwoerd announced that South Africa would follow suit "if possible".

In January 1961, Verwoerd's government enacted legislation to transform the Union of South Africa into the Republic of South Africa. The constitution was finalised in April. It merged the authority of the British Crown and Governor-General into a new post, State President of South Africa. The State President would have relatively little political power, serving more as the ceremonial head of state. The political power was to lie with the Prime Minister (head of government). The Republic of South Africa would also have its monetary system, employing Rand and Cents.

In March 1961, Verwoerd visited the 1961 Commonwealth Prime Ministers' Conference in London to discuss South Africa becoming a republic within the Commonwealth, presenting the Republic of South Africa's application for a renewal of its membership to the Commonwealth. The Commonwealth had earlier declined to predict how republican status would affect South Africa's membership; it did not want to be seen meddling in its members' domestic affairs. However, many of the Conference's affiliates (prominent among them the Afro-Asia group and Canadian Prime Minister John Diefenbaker) attacked South Africa's racial policies and rebuffed Verwoerd's application; they would go to any lengths to expel South Africa from the Commonwealth. Numerous anti-apartheid movements also campaigned for South Africa's exclusion from the UK. Some member countries warned that they would pull out of the organisation unless South Africa were expelled. Verwoerd disregarded the censure, arguing that his Commonwealth cohorts had no right to question and criticise his country's domestic affairs. On this issue, he even had the support of his parliamentary opposition.

Thus, on 15 March 1961, ostensibly to Britain an awkward decision and causing a split within the Commonwealth, but more likely to avoid further condemnation and embarrassment, Verwoerd withdrew his application and announced that South Africa would become a republic outside the Commonwealth. His decision was received with regret by the Prime Ministers of the UK, Australia and New Zealand but was met with obvious approval from South Africa's critics. Verwoerd said the next day that the move would not affect South Africa's relationship with the United Kingdom. On his homecoming, he was met with a rapturous reception. Afrikaner nationalists were not deterred by the relinquishment of Commonwealth membership, for they regarded the Commonwealth as little more than the British Empire in disguise. They believed that South Africa and the United Kingdom had absolutely nothing in common, and even UP leader Sir De Villiers Graaff praised Verwoerd for his handling of the situation.

On 31 May 1961, South Africa became a republic. The date was a significant one in Afrikaner history, as it heralded the anniversary of several historical events, the 1902 Treaty of Vereeniging, which ended the Anglo-Boer War; South Africa's becoming a union in 1910; and the first hoisting of the Union flag in 1928. The Afrikaner republican dream had finally come to reality.

The significance of Commonwealth withdrawal turned out to be less than expected. It was not necessary for South Africa to amend its trading preferences, and Prime Minister Macmillan reciprocated Verwoerd's assurance that withdrawal would not alter trade between South Africa and the UK.

South Africa now had its first independent constitution. However, the only real constitutional change was that the State President, in charge for seven years, would assume the now-vacant position of the Queen as Head of State. C. R. Swart, the State President-elect, took the first republican oath as State President of South Africa before Chief Justice L. C. Steyn (DRC).

Although White inhabitants were generally happy with the republic, united in their support of Verwoerd, the Blacks defiantly rejected the move. Nelson Mandela and his National Action Council demonstrated from 29 to 31 May 1961. The republican issue would strongly intensify resistance to apartheid.

In October 1961, Verwoerd appointed the National Party's two first English-speaking ministers.

== Support ==
The NP won most parliamentary seats in all elections during the apartheid era. Its popular vote record was more mixed: While it won the popular vote with a comfortable margin in most general elections, the NP carried less than 50% of the electorate in 1948, 1953, 1961, and 1989. In 1977, the NP got its best-ever result in the elections with the support of 64.8% of the White voters and 134 parliamentary seats out of 165. After this, the party's consent declined as a proliferation of right-wing parties siphoned off important segments of its traditional voter base.

Throughout its reign, the party's support came mainly from Afrikaners, but other White people were courted by and increasingly voted for the NP after 1960. By the 1980s, however, in reaction to the "verligte" reforms of P. W. Botha, the majority of Afrikaners drifted to the Conservative Party of Andries Treurnicht, who called for a return to the traditional policies of the NP. In the 1974 general elections for example 91% of Afrikaners voted for the NP; however, in the 1989 general elections, only 46% of Afrikaners cast their ballot for the National party.

== Division and decline ==
=== Factional warfare: "Verkramptes" and "Verligtes" ===
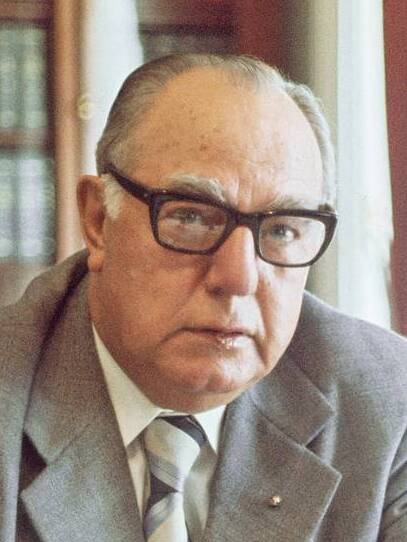
B. J. Vorster was the prime minister from 1966 to his resignation in 1978 and state president from 1978 to 1979.

Following the assassination of Verwoerd, B. J. Vorster took over as party leader and Prime Minister. From the 1960s onwards, the NP and the Afrikaner population in general was increasingly divided over the application of apartheid (the legal opposition being similarly divided over its response), leading to the emergence of the "verkramptes" and "verligtes". Verkramptes were members of the party's right-wing who opposed any deviation from the rigid apartheid structure. Verligtes took a somewhat more moderate stance towards racial issues, primarily from a pragmatic standpoint over fears of international scrutiny should reforms fail to be made.

In addition to the question of apartheid, the two factions were divided over such issues as immigration, language, racially-mixed sporting teams, and engagement with Black African states. In 1969, members of the "verkrampte" faction including Albert Hertzog and Jaap Marais, formed the Herstigte Nasionale Party, which claimed to be the true upholder of pure Verwoerdian apartheid ideology and continues to exist today. While it never had much electoral success, it attracted sufficient numbers to erode support for the government at crucial points, although not to the extent that the Conservative Party would do. Meanwhile, the verligtes began to gain some traction inside the party in response to growing international opposition to apartheid.

Perhaps a precursor to the split came around 1960 when Japie Basson, a moderate, was expelled for disagreements on racial questions and would form his own National Union Party, he would later join the United Party and Progressive Federal Party before rejoining the NP in the 1980s. Former Interior Minister Theo Gerdener formed the Democratic Party in 1973 to attempt its own verligte solution to racial questions.

=== National Party under Botha ===
Beginning in the early 1980s, under the leadership of P. W. Botha, Prime Minister since 1978, the NP began to reform its policies. Botha legalised interracial marriages and multiracial political parties and relaxed the Group Areas Act. Botha also amended the constitution to grant a measure of political representation to Coloureds and Indians by creating separate parliamentary chambers in which they had control of their "own affairs". The amendments also replaced the parliamentary system with a presidential one. The powers of the Prime Minister were essentially merged with those of the State President, which was vested with sweeping executive powers. Although portraying the new system as a power-sharing agreement, Botha ensured that the real power remained in White hands, and in practice, in the hands of the NP. Whites had large majorities in the electoral college which chose the State President, as well as on the President's Council, which settled disputes between the three chambers and decided which combination of them could consider any piece of legislation. However, Botha and the NP refused to budge on the central issue of granting meaningful political rights to Black South Africans, who remained unrepresented even after the reforms. Most Black political organisations remained banned, and prominent Black leaders, including Nelson Mandela, remained imprisoned.

While Botha's reforms did not even begin to meet the opposition's demands, they sufficiently alarmed a segment of his own party to engender a second split. In 1982, hardline NP members including Andries Treurnicht and Ferdinand Hartzenberg formed the Conservative Party, committed to reversing Botha's reforms, which by 1987 became the largest parliamentary opposition party. The party later merged into the Freedom Front, which today represents Afrikaner nationalism. On the other hand, some reformist NP members also left the party, such as Dennis Worrall and Wynand Malan, who formed the Independent Party which later merged into the Democratic Party (a similar breakaway group existed for a time in the 1970s). The loss of NP support to both the DP and CP reflected the divisions among White voters over continued maintenance of apartheid.

=== National Party under de Klerk and final years of apartheid ===
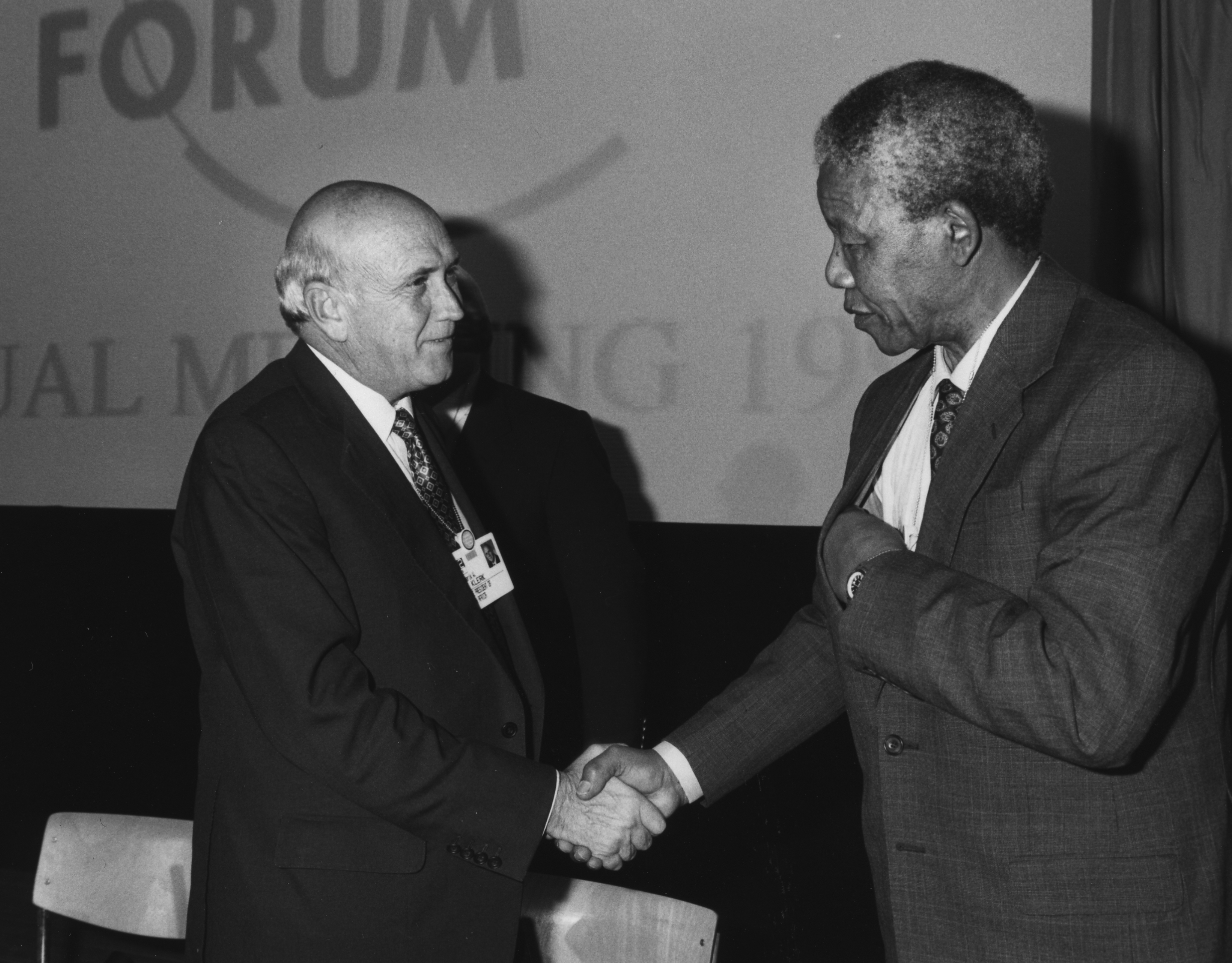
F. W. de Klerk shaking hands with ANC leader Nelson Mandela at the World Economic Forum in 1992

In the midst of rising political instability, growing economic problems and diplomatic isolation, Botha resigned as NP leader, and subsequently as State President in 1989. He was replaced by F. W. de Klerk in this capacity. Although conservative by inclination, De Klerk had become the leader of an "enlightened" NP faction that realised apartheid could not be maintained forever. He decided that it would be better to negotiate an end to apartheid while there was still time to reach a compromise, than to hold out until forced to negotiate on less favourable terms later. He persuaded the NP to enter into negotiations with representatives of the Black community. Late in 1989, the NP won the most bitterly contested election in decades, pledging to negotiate an end to the very apartheid system that it had established.

On 2 February 1990, the African National Congress (ANC) was legalised, and Nelson Mandela was released after twenty-seven years of imprisonment. In the same year, the NP opened its membership to all racial groups and moves began to repeal the racial legislation which had been the foundations of apartheid. A referendum in 1992 gave De Klerk plenipotentiary powers to negotiate with Mandela. Following the negotiations, a new interim constitution was drawn up, and non-racial democratic elections were held in 1994. These elections were won by the African National Congress. The NP remained in government, however, as a coalition partner to the ANC in the Government of National Unity until 30 June 1996, when it withdrew to become the official opposition.

=== Post-apartheid era ===
Logo of the National Party during the 1990s

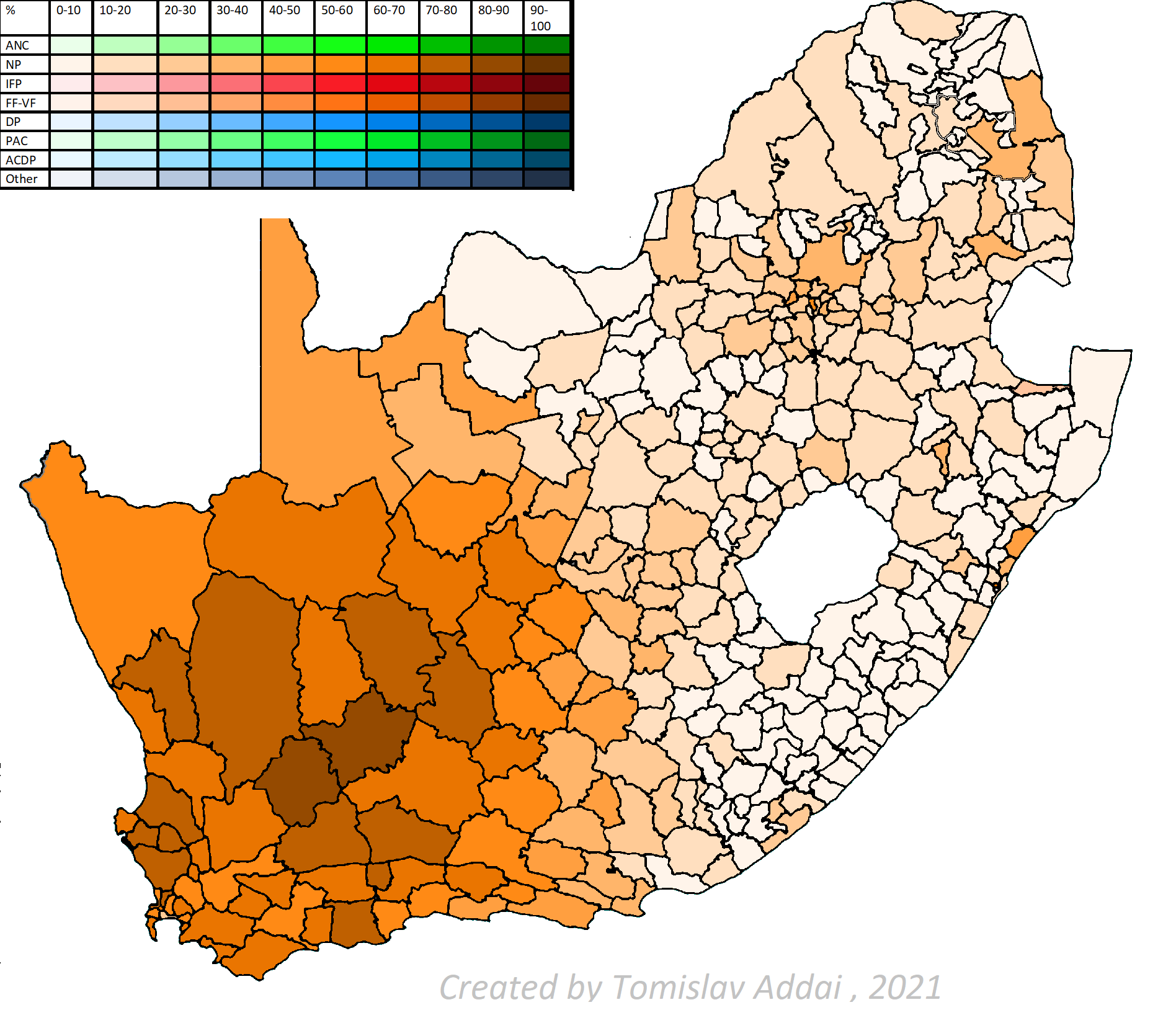
Share of National Party votes in 1994. The areas which voted for the National Party were largely Afrikaans or English speaking.

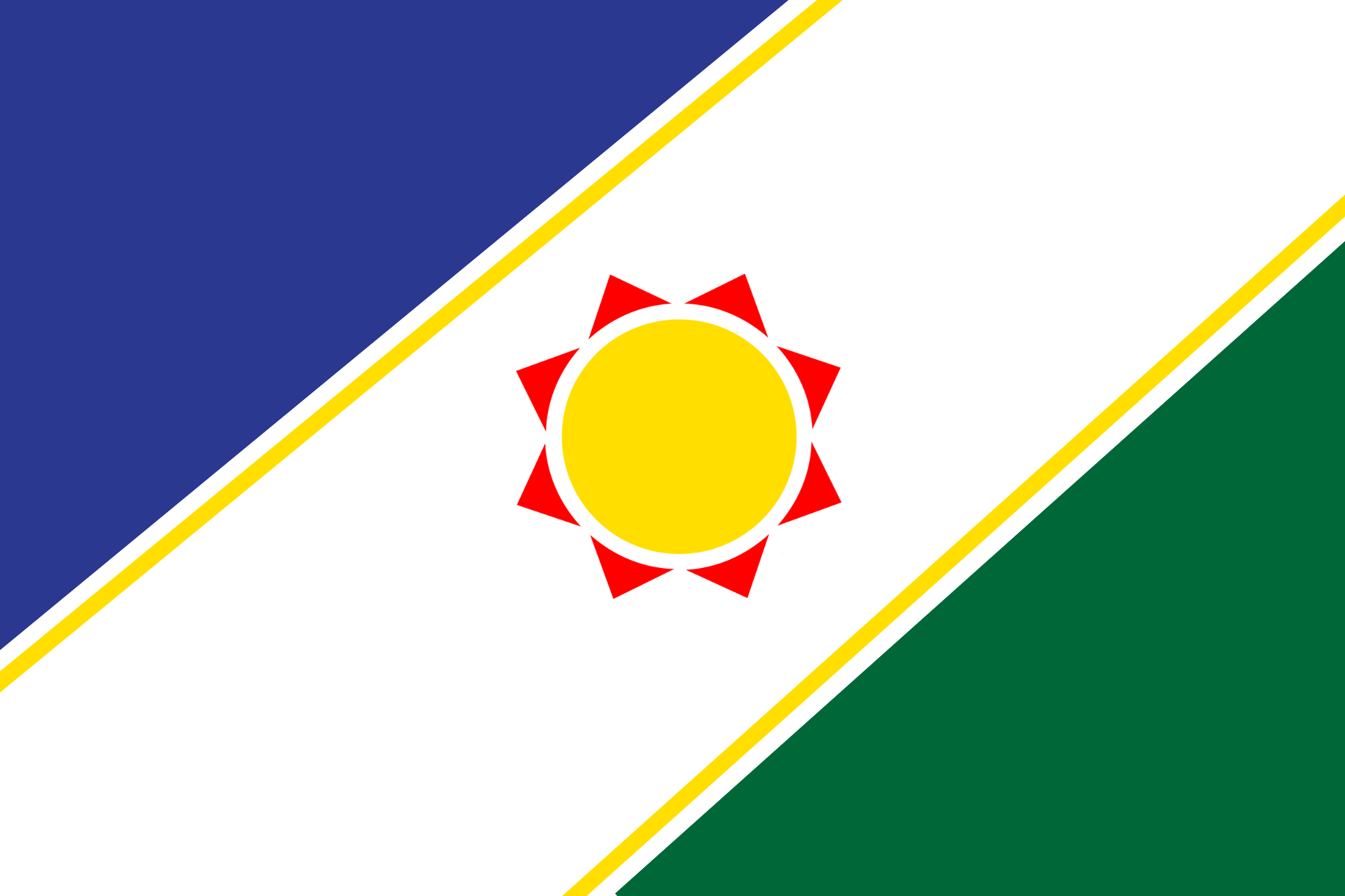
Flag of the National Party during the 1990s

The National Party won 20.39% of the vote and 82 seats in the National Assembly at the first multiracial election in 1994. This support extended well beyond the White community and into other minority groups. For instance, two-thirds of Indian South Africans voted for the NP. It became the official opposition in most provinces and also won a majority in the Western Cape, winning much of the White and Coloured vote. Its Coloured support also earned it a strong second place in the Northern Cape. The party was wracked by internal wranglings whilst it participated in the Government of National Unity, and finally withdrew from the government to become the official opposition in 1996. Despite this, it remained uncertain about its future direction, and was continually outperformed in parliament by the much smaller Democratic Party (DP), which provided a more forceful and principled opposition stance. In 1997, its voter base began to gradually shift to the DP. The NP renamed itself the New National Party towards the end of 1997, to distance itself from the apartheid past.

However, the NNP would quickly disappear from the political scene, faring poorly at both the 1999 and 2004 general elections. After initially aligning with the DP in 2000 (forming the Democratic Alliance), the merger was aborted, and after a back and forth on whether to oppose or work with the ANC, the NNP and ANC finally formed an alliance in late-2001. After years of losing members and support to other parties, the NNP's collapse in its previous stronghold in the Western Cape at the 2004 general election proved to be the final straw; its federal council voted to dissolve the party on 9 April 2005, following a decision the previous year to merge with the ANC.

== Re-establishment ==
On 5 August 2008 a new party using the name of "National Party South Africa" was formed and registered with the Independent Electoral Commission. The new party had no formal connection with the now defunct New National Party. The relaunched National Party of 2008 pushed for a non-racial democratic South Africa based on federal principles and the legacy of F. W. de Klerk.

== Organisational structure ==
The National Party was not a unitary organisation, but rather a loose federation of the four provincial parties (Cape, Transvaal, Natal, and the Orange Free State). Each provincial party maintained its own distinct leader, character, identity, party organisation, membership, and even its own press and constitution. This federal structure was a key reason for the NP's growth and survival, as it allowed for de-centralised organisational dynamics and accommodated regional differences.

=== Federal Council ===
The highest decision-making body linking these provincial parties was the Federal Council (Afrikaans: Federale Raad). In theory, the highest authority within each provincial party was its provincial congress, which met annually. These congresses held the exclusive power to introduce amendments to the party's principles and action programmes. The Federal Council served as the organisational link between the provinces, ensuring unity on shared political principles.

=== Party leader ===
The party leader (who concurrently served as prime minister, and later as State President) was the party's chief executive. The leader was elected by the party's parliamentary caucus, not directly by the provincial congresses. This concentration of policy-making power in the leader was reinforced by a political culture rooted in Calvinist tradition, where "the Afrikaner's habit of obedience towards leaders" meant that appointments to positions of authority were sometimes accepted as "God's will".

In later years, especially under the leadership of P. W. Botha, this cultural respect for leadership contributed to a shift in decision-making. Governance moved from a "bottom-up" to a "top-down" approach. The leader's requests were largely obeyed as commands, which meant that the Federal Council, provincial congresses, and caucus would accept drastic policy changes without posing a serious threat to party unity. This dynamic allowed Botha to push through significant reforms, such as the tricameral system, despite potential internal dissent.

=== Distinct characters of the provincial parties ===
The NP's federal structure was not merely an administrative arrangement, but a reflection of profound regional differences in the voter base and political culture.

These regional differences were not merely academic. From 1960 to 1966, the Cape NP was regarded in nationalist circles as an "opposition party" within the NP itself, engaging in open conflict with the northern provinces over "precisely the basic question of the constitution of the Afrikaner volk and the nature of its interests". This intra-party struggle laid the groundwork for the later verligte–verkrampte conflict that would ultimately fracture the party in the 1980s.

==== The Cape National Party ====
The National Party of the Cape (Afrikaans: Nasionale Party van die Kaapland) rested on an economic and political alliance between wealthier Afrikaner capitalist farmers, particularly in the Western Cape, and a small group of Afrikaner financial capitalists centred on institutions such as Sanlam and Volkskas. This class base gave the Cape NP a distinctly capitalist orientation and a more moderate, pragmatic political style. The party's interpretation of Afrikaner interests placed far greater emphasis on the conditions to secure stable capitalist profit.

This economic outlook translated into policy differences. The Cape NP was consistently more verlig (enlightened, reformist) than its northern counterpart, particularly on labour policy, where it favoured much looser restrictions on the mobility and training of African labour. The Cape NP was also described as "less brash, more tolerant, democratic and civilized" than their Transvaal counterpart, having been "more deeply imbued with British concepts of democratic processes as well as the idea of compromise" through prolonged contact with British political culture in the Cape. Notably, the Afrikaner Broederbond was not a particularly important force in Cape politics, in contrast to its central role in the north.

==== Transvaal National Party ====
The Transvaal National Party (Afrikaans: Nasionale Party van Transvaal) was built on a broader and more populist class alliance. It brought together white farmers, white workers in the mines and secondary industries, the Afrikaans-speaking petty bourgeoisie in the state apparatus and professions, small businessmen, and a nascent group of commercial capitalists. This coalition gave the Transvaal party a more hardline, verkrampte (hardline conservative) character, with its ideological appeal directed toward the "small man" against the large, predominantly English-speaking monopolies that dominated the economy.

The Transvaal NP's greater population, larger number of parliamentary seats, and dominant economic position led it to regard itself as the power base of the NP, placing its provincial leader in a very powerful position. Indeed, after D. F. Malan's retirement, most of his successors — J. G. Strijdom, H. F. Verwoerd, B. J. Vorster, and F. W. de Klerk — hailed from the Transvaal. The party's stronghold in the industrial heartland gave it a base of white working-class support that was less significant in the Cape, where the impoverished Afrikaner working class was smaller.

==== The OFS National Party ====
The Orange Free State National Party (Afrikaans: Nasionale Party van die Oranje-Vrystaat) represented a distinct strand of Afrikaner nationalism rooted in the smaller white farming community and an internally oriented agricultural economy. Unlike the Cape's export-oriented farming, OFS agriculture was geared toward the internal market — a structural difference that fed directly into the province's political outlook. This economic base gave the OFS NP a strongly republicanist character, hostile to imperial economic ties and committed to Afrikaner self-assertion.

The OFS NP's character, grounded in smaller, less capital-intensive farmers, inclined it toward a more populist and less capitalist orientation than the Cape NP. It was not a major site of the verligte–verkrampte battles that shook the party in later decades, but it provided a reliable base of support for the verkrampte, particularly on questions of racial policy and Afrikaner cultural hegemony. The province remained a bedrock of NP loyalty throughout the apartheid era, its white electorate overwhelmingly backing the party until the 1994 transition.

==== Natal National Party ====
The Natal National Party (Afrikaans: Nasionale Party van Natal) was the weakest of the four provincial parties and occupied a fundamentally different position from its counterparts. Natal was the one province where the NP never achieved political hegemony; provincial politics were dominated first by the United Party and later by the New Republic Party. The white population was predominantly English-speaking, and there existed a political culture that was, in many respects, provincialist and anti-Afrikaner, with a long history of settler antagonism toward the northern provinces.

This demographic reality shaped the Natal NP's character in two ways. First, the party was pragmatic and conciliatory by necessity, oriented toward winning support in a province where Afrikaners were a minority and where English-speaking voters had to be courted. Second, the Natal NP was consistently the most verligte of the four provincial parties. As early as the 1930s, D. F. Malan recognised that the "Indian question" was viewed differently in Natal: not primarily as a threat to the Afrikaner poor, but as "a concern to the English in Natal". This sensitivity to the province's distinct racial and demographic composition persisted throughout the party's history.

== List of presidents ==
No.	Portrait	Name (Birth–Death)	Term of office		
No.	Portrait	Name (Birth–Death)	Took office	Left office	Duration
1		J. B. M. Hertzog (1866–1942)	1 July 1914	c. 1934	c. 20 years
2		D. F. Malan (1874–1959)	c. 1934	c. 1953	c. 19 years
3		J. G. Strijdom (1893–1958)	c. 1953	24 August 1958	c. 5 years
4	Zuid Afrikaanse premier dr. H. Verwoerd, Bestanddeelnr 911-1297 (cropped)	Hendrik Verwoerd (1901–1966)	24 August 1958	6 September 1966	8 years, 13 days
5		John Vorster (1915–1983)	6 September 1966	2 October 1978	12 years, 26 days
6		P. W. Botha (1916–2006)	2 October 1978	15 August 1989	10 years, 317 days
7		F. W. de Klerk (1936–2021)	15 August 1989	8 September 1997	8 years, 24 days

== Electoral history ==
=== State Presidential elections ===
Election	Party candidate	Votes	%	Result
State President elected by a joint sitting of both houses of Parliament
1961	C. R. Swart	139	66.19%	Elected ✓
1967	Eben Dönges	163	75.81%	Elected ✓
1968	Jim Fouché	Unanimous	100%	Elected ✓
1975	Nico Diederichs	Unanimous	100%	Elected ✓
1978	John Vorster	173	84.8%	Elected ✓
1979	Marais Viljoen	155	79.49%	Elected ✓
State President elected by an electoral college
1984	P. W. Botha	88	100%	Elected ✓
1989	F. W. de Klerk	88	100%	Elected ✓

=== House of Assembly elections ===
Election	Party leader	Votes	%	Seats	+/–	Position	Result
1915	J. B. M. Hertzog	75,623	29.41%	27 / 130	▲27	▲3rd	Opposition
1920	J. B. M. Hertzog	90,512	32.62%	43 / 134	▲16	▲1st	Opposition
1921	J. B. M. Hertzog	105,039	38.15%	44 / 134	▲1	▼2nd	Opposition
1924	J. B. M. Hertzog	111,483	35.25%	63 / 135	▲19	▲1st	NP-Labour coalition government
1929	J. B. M. Hertzog	141,579	41.17%	78 / 148	▲15	1st	NP-Labour coalition government
1933	J. B. M. Hertzog	101,159	31.61%	75 / 150	▼3	1st	Majority government
1938	D. F. Malan	259,543	31.31%	27 / 150	▼48	▼2nd	Opposition
1943	D. F. Malan	321,601	36.70%	43 / 150	▲16	2nd	Opposition
1948	D. F. Malan	401,834	37.70%	70 / 150	▲27	▲1st	Majority government
1953	D. F. Malan	598,718	49.48%	94 / 156	▲24	1st	Majority government
1958	J. G. Strijdom	642,006	55.54%	103 / 156	▲9	1st	Majority government
1961	Hendrik Verwoerd	370,395	46.44%	105 / 156	▲2	1st	Supermajority government
1966	Hendrik Verwoerd	759,331	58.31%	126 / 166	▲21	1st	Supermajority government
1970	John Vorster	820,968	54.89%	118 / 166	▼8	1st	Supermajority government
1974	John Vorster	638,424	56.14%	122 / 171	▲4	1st	Supermajority government
1977	John Vorster	685,035	65.34%	134 / 165	▲12	1st	Supermajority government
1981	P. W. Botha	778,371	57.66%	131 / 165	▼3	1st	Supermajority government
1987	P. W. Botha	1,075,505	52.70%	123 / 166	▼8	1st	Supermajority government
1989	F. W. de Klerk	1,039,704	48.19%	94 / 166	▼29	1st	Majority government
1994	F. W. de Klerk	3,983,960	20.39%	82 / 400	▼12	▼2nd	NP–ANC–IFP coalition government

=== Senate elections ===
Election	Party leader	%	Seats	+/–	Position	Result
1939	D. F. Malan	13.64%	6 / 44	▲4	▲2nd	Opposition
1948	D. F. Malan	25%	11 / 44	▲5	2nd	Governing minority
1955	J. G. Strijdom	86.52%	77 / 89	▲66	▲1st	Governing supermajority
1960	Hendrik Verwoerd	70.37%	38 / 54	▼39	1st	Governing supermajority
1965	Hendrik Verwoerd	75.47%	40 / 53	▲2	1st	Governing supermajority
1970	John Vorster	75.93%	41 / 54	▲1	1st	Governing supermajority
1974	John Vorster	77.78%	42 / 54	▲1	1st	Governing supermajority
1994	F. W. de Klerk	18.89%	17 / 90	▼25	▼2nd	NP–ANC–IFP governing coalition

== Notable people ==
- Vera Reitzer (1921–2006) Hungarian-born Jewish holocaust survivor, and National Party member
