= Separate Representation of Voters Amendment Act, 1968 =

Repealed South African apartheid law

Parliament of South Africa
- Long title: Act to provide for the further extension of the period of office of the sitting members of the House of Assembly elected under the Separate Representation of Voters Act, 1951; to prohibit the filling of any vacancy in the representation of any division referred to in section 6 (2) (a) or (b) of the said Act or in the representation of non-Europeans in the Senate under section 7 of the said Act; to repeal the said Act with effect from the date of dissolution of the House of Assembly; and to provide for matters incidental thereto.
- Citation: Act No. 50 of 1968
- Enacted by: Parliament of South Africa
- Assented to: 27 May 1968
- Commenced: 5 June 1968 / 2 March 1970
- Repealed: 3 September 1984

Repealed by
- Republic of South Africa Constitution Act, 1983

Related legislation
- Separate Representation of Voters Act, 1951
- Status: Repealed

The Separate Representation of Voters Amendment Act, 1968 (Act No. 50 of 1968) was an act of the Parliament of South Africa enacted under the government of B. J. Vorster, which repealed the Separate Representation of Voters Act, 1951.

The act provided for the expiry of the term of all members of the South African Parliament who had represented "non-European" voters, as well as preventing the election of any future members under that categorisation.

This removed the four members of the House of Assembly who were elected by Coloured voters in the Cape Province as well as abolishing the additional nominated seat in the Senate for the "non-European" (i.e. Coloured, as black Africans were explicitly excluded from the definition under section 1 (ii) of the 1951 act) population of the Cape Province, that had only been filled once in 1957 and had been vacant since 1962. Subsequently the House of Assembly would be elected solely by white voters.

The act was promulgated on 5 June 1968, but the repeal only took effect at the dissolution of the House of Assembly on 2 March 1970, before the general election of 22 April 1970. In the interim, the term of office of the four members was extended and the filling of any vacancy in their seats (or the vacancy of the additional Senate seat for the Coloured population of the Cape Province) was prohibited.

In 1969, Coloured citizens were given the right to elect members to the Coloured Persons Representative Council, a quasi-legislative body with limited powers.

The act was repealed by the Constitution of 1983, which created the House of Representatives to represent Coloured citizens in Parliament.
