= De Villiers Graaff =

South African politician (1913–1999)

Sir De Villiers Graaff Bt DMS OBE
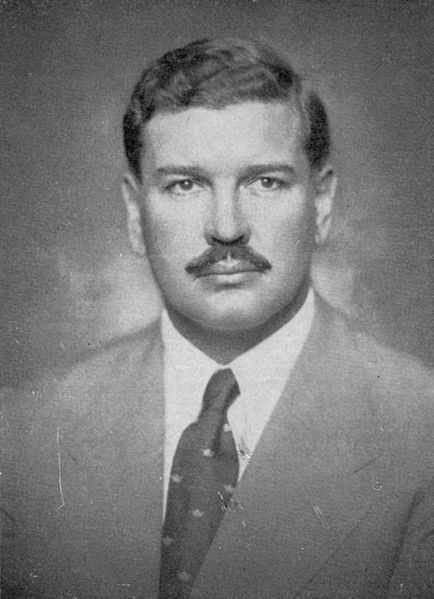
- Graaff in a 1963 publication

Leader of the United Party
- In office 1956–1977
- Preceded by: Jacobus Gideon Nel Strauss
- Succeeded by: Party disbanded

Personal details
- Born: 8 December 1913 Cape Town, Cape Province, Union of South Africa
- Died: 4 October 1999 (aged 85) Cape Town, Western Cape, South Africa
- Party: United Party (1948-1977); New Republic Party (1977-78)
- Education: University of Cape Town; Leiden University; University of Oxford
- Occupation: Politician, Lawyer, Dairy Farmer

Military service
- Allegiance: Union of South Africa; United Kingdom
- Branch/service: Union Defence Force
- Rank: Lieutenant
- Battles/wars: World War II; Siege of Tobruk (POW)

Sir De Villiers "Div" Graaff, 2nd Baronet (8 December 1913 – 4 October 1999) was a South African politician who succeeded his father, Sir David Graaff, to his baronetcy in 1931. He died in 1999 and was succeeded by his son, Sir David de Villiers Graaff, 3rd Baronet. He was the leader of the centrist United Party which was the official opposition in the then all-white South African Parliament from 1956 to 1977.

== Early life ==
Graaff was born on 8 December 1913 in Cape Town, Cape Province. He attended Western Province Preparatory School and served as head boy during his final year at the school.

Graaff succeeded his father as baronet in 1931. This baronetcy is one of twelve conferred on South Africans between 1841 and 1924.

Graaff played two matches of first-class cricket for Western Province during the 1932–33 South African season. A right-handed opening batsman, he scored 99 runs at an average of 33.00, with a top score of 67 in the first innings of the second match.

He studied law at the Universities of Cape Town, Leiden, and Oxford. In 1937, he returned to South Africa and was admitted as an advocate in the South African Supreme Court.

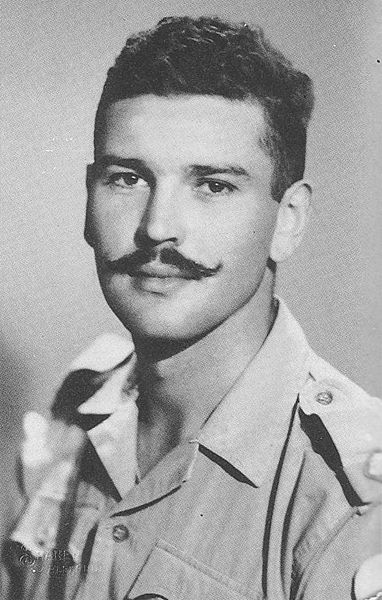
Graaff in military uniform during World War II

At the outbreak of World War II, Graaff joined the Union Defence Force. He served in North Africa and was taken prisoner of war by Axis forces during the Axis capture of Tobruk. He spent the rest of the war transitioning between German and Italian prison camps and was later appointed an Officer of the Order of the British Empire (OBE) in 1946 for his relief efforts among prisoners.

His youngest brother was Johannes de Villiers Graaff, a noted South African welfare economist.

== Political career ==
Graaff became a member of the House of Assembly, the lower house of Parliament, in 1948, the year his United Party was ousted from government by the conservative National Party, which promised to enact a de jure system of apartheid. Victory in De Villiers' constituency (Hottentots-Holland) was the sole UP gain in the election; nevertheless, Graaff took over leadership of the United Party in 1956 from J.G.N. Strauss. He led the opposition to the governments of three apartheid prime ministers, Johannes Strijdom, Hendrik Verwoerd, and B.J. Vorster.

He led the opposition to a republic in the 1960 referendum, and stated that South Africa's membership of the Commonwealth was under threat, and the declaration of a republic would lead to South Africa being isolated internationally. The declaration of the republic along with a new requirement for Commonwealth membership respecting racial equality resulted in South Africa's withdrawal from the Commonwealth in 1961.

In 1977, the United Party was dissolved and the New Republic Party was founded, of which Graaff briefly served as interim leader before retiring. During his time as leader of the United Party it had split four times and been defeated in five general elections.

== Legacy ==
The M1 highway, which was originally part of a ring road around the southern end of the Central Business District of Johannesburg to the affluent northern suburbs, was named the De Villiers Graaff Motorway in his honour.

Baronetage of the United Kingdom
Preceded by David Graaff	Baronet (of Tygerberg); 1931–1999	Succeeded by David Graaff
Political offices
Preceded by Jacobus Gideon Nel Strauss	Leader of the United Party; 1956–1977	disbanded
