= Separate Representation of Voters Act, 1951 =

Legislation during the apartheid era of South Africa

Parliament of South Africa
- Long title: Act to make provision for the separate representation in Parliament and in the provincial council of the province of the Cape of Good Hope of Europeans and non-Europeans in that province, and to that end to amend the law relating to the registration of Europeans and non-Europeans as voters for Parliament and for the said provincial council; to amend the law relating to the registration of non-Europeans and natives in the province of Natal as voters for Parliament and for the provincial council of Natal; to establish a Board for Coloured Affairs; and to provide for matters incidental thereto.
- Citation: Act No. 46 of 1951
- Enacted by: Parliament of South Africa
- Royal assent: 15 June 1951
- Commenced: 2 March 1956
- Repealed: 2 March 1970
- Administered by: Minister of the Interior

Repealed by
- Separate Representation of Voters Amendment Act, 1968

Related legislation
- Representation of Natives Act, 1936
- Status: Repealed

The Separate Representation of Voters Act No. 46 was introduced in South Africa on 18 June 1951. Part of the legislation during the apartheid era, the National Party introduced it to enforce racial segregation, and was part of a deliberate process to remove all non-white people from the voters' roll and revoke the Cape Qualified Franchise system.

This act was declared invalid by the Supreme Court when challenged in the case of Harris v Minister of the Interior 1952(2) SA 428(AD); this gave rise to the Coloured vote constitutional crisis. The government, however, was able to circumvent the court's decision by increasing the number of Appellate Division judges from five to eleven, and increasing the size of the Senate from forty-eight to eighty-nine. These changes enabled the government to successfully introduce the South Africa Act Amendment Act No 9 of 2 March 1956, effectively overturning the Supreme Court's decision and revalidating the act. This amendment was repealed by the Republic of South Africa Constitution Act 32 of 1961. This case was one of many where South Africa's parliamentary sovereignty enabled the passing of laws without being subject to judicial review on substantive grounds. The judiciary was bound therefore leaving the legislature and executive to act independently from the third arm of government. Arguably this silencing of the judiciary allowed the Apartheid state to become further entrenched in the legal sphere of South Africa.

The act as a whole was repealed by section 4 of the Separate Representation of Voters Amendment Act No 50 of 27 March 1968. This act introduced the Coloured Persons Representative Council, consisting of forty elected members and twenty nominated members. This council could make laws on finance, local government, education, community welfare and pensions, rural settlements and agriculture which affected coloured people. A bill could only be introduced when approved by the Minister of Coloured Relations, as well as requiring the approval of the white Cabinet. This act was repealed in 1983 by section 101(1) of the Republic of South Africa Constitution Act No 110, which enacted the South African Constitution of 1983 and its Tricameral Parliament.
