= 1960 South African republic referendum =

- 5 October 1960
- Are you in favour of a Republic for the Union?
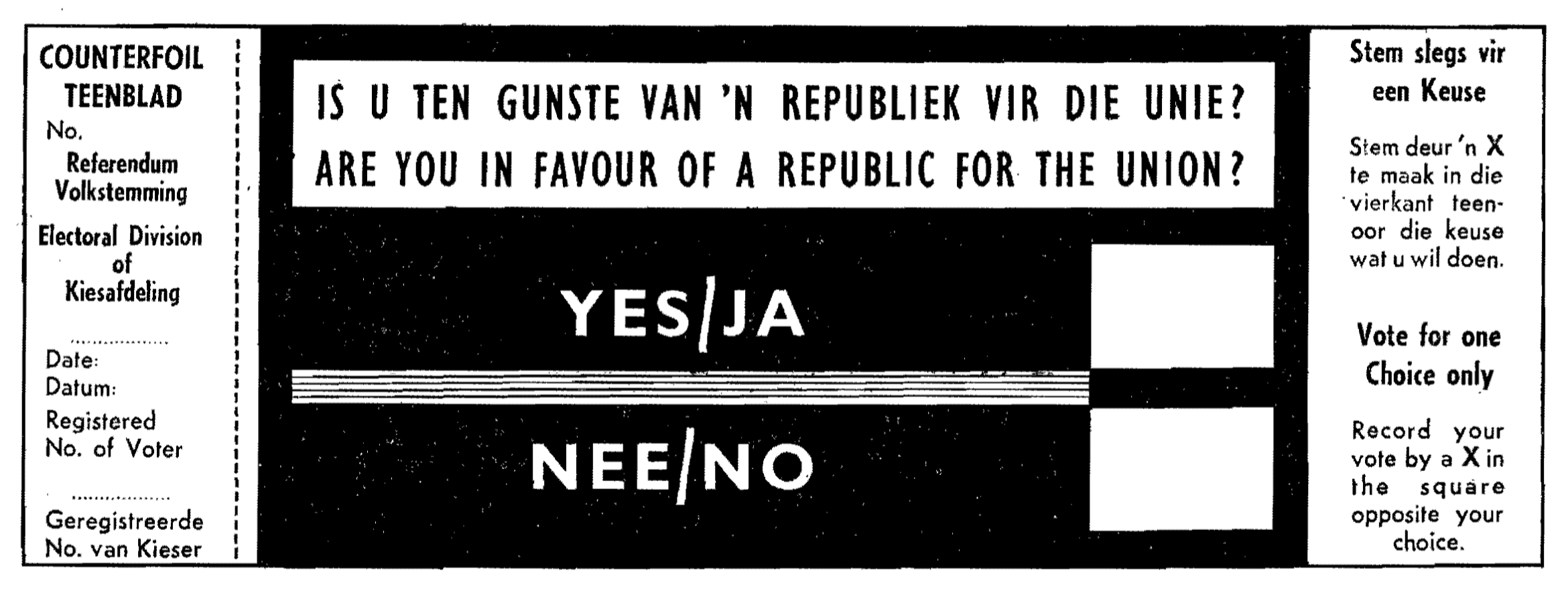
- Ballot paper used in the referendum. Ballot reads on the upper row: IS U TEN GUNSTE VAN 'N REPUBLIEK VIR DIE UNIE? in Afrikaans and on the bottom row: ARE YOU IN FAVOUR OF A REPUBLIC FOR THE UNION? in English.
- Outcome: South African Constitution of 1961: The Union of South Africa is replaced by the Republic of South Africa.; The monarch and governor-general are replaced by the state presidency as head of state.; Afrikaans and English declared official languages, Dutch included under Afrikaans and thus ousted as a separate official language.

Results
Choice	Votes	%
Yes	850,458	52.29%
No	775,878	47.71%
Valid votes	1,626,336	99.52%
Invalid or blank votes	7,904	0.48%
Total votes	1,634,240	100.00%
Registered voters/turnout	1,800,426	90.77%
- Results by province Yes: 50–55% 55–60% 60–65% 75–80% No: 75–80%

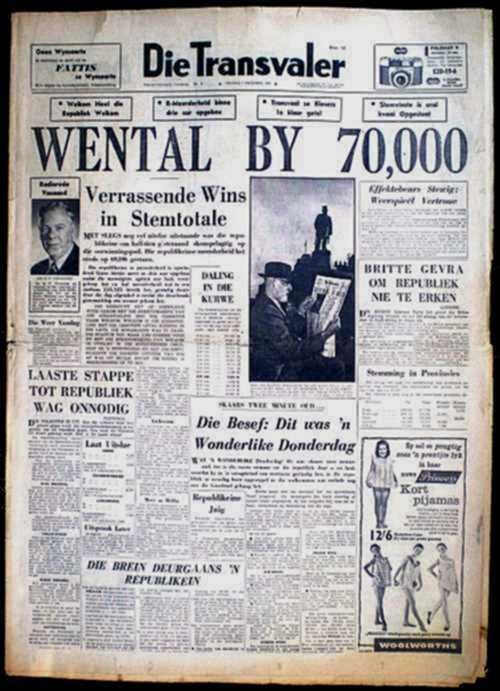
Front page of Die Transvaler, 7 October 1960, announcing republican victory by 70,000 votes

A referendum on becoming a republic was held in South Africa on 5 October 1960. The Afrikaner-dominated right-wing National Party, which had come to power in 1948, was avowedly republican and regarded the position of Queen Elizabeth II as the South African monarch as a relic of British imperialism. The National Party government subsequently organised the referendum on whether the then Union of South Africa should become a republic. The vote, which was restricted to whites—the first such national election in the union—was narrowly approved by 52.29% of the voters. The Republic of South Africa was constituted on 31 May 1961.

== Background ==
=== Afrikaner republicanism ===
Despite the defeat of the two Boer Republics, the South African Republic (also known as the Transvaal) and the Orange Free State, republican sentiment remained strong in the Union of South Africa among Afrikaners. D. F. Malan broke with the National Party of Prime Minister J. B. M. Hertzog when it merged with the South African Party of Jan Smuts to form the Gesuiwerde Nasionale Party (or "Purified National Party") which advocated a South African republic under Afrikaner control. This had the support of the secretive Afrikaner Broederbond organisation, whose chairman, Lodewicus du Plessis declared:

National culture and national welfare cannot unfold fully if the people of South Africa do not also constitutionally sever all foreign ties. After the cultural and economic needs, the Afrikaner will have to devote his attention to the constitutional needs of our people. Added to that objective must be an entirely independent genuine, Afrikaans form of government for South Africa... a form of government which through its embodiment in our own personal head of state, bone of our bone, flesh of our flesh, will inspire us to irresistible unity and strength.

In 1940, Malan, along with Hertzog, founded the Herenigde Nasionale Party (or "Reunited National Party") which pledged to fight for "a free independent republic, separated from the British Crown and Empire", and "to remove, step by step, all anomalies which hamper the fullest expression of our national freedom".

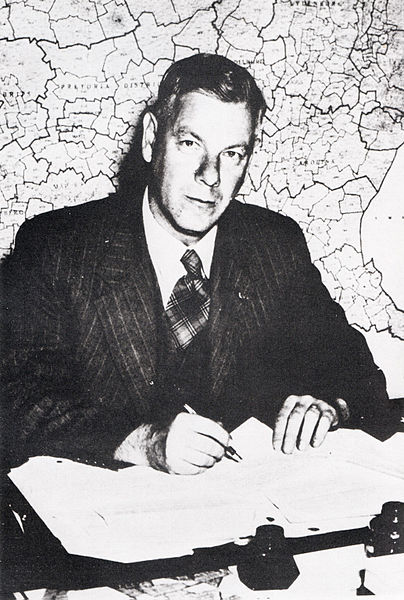
Hendrik Verwoerd, editor of Die Transvaler and later Prime Minister of South Africa from 1958 to 1966

That year, a Commission appointed by the Broederbond, met to draft a constitution for a republic; this included future National Party ministers, such as Hendrik Verwoerd, Albert Hertzog and Eben Dönges.

In 1942, details of a draft republican constitution were published in Afrikaans-language newspapers Die Burger and Die Transvaler, which provided for a State President, elected by white citizens known as Burgers only, who would be "only responsible to God... for his deeds in the fulfilment of his duties", aided by a Community Council with exclusively advisory powers, while Afrikaans would be the first official language, with English as a supplemental language.

On the matter of continued Commonwealth membership, the Broederbond's view was that "departure from the Commonwealth as soon as possible remains a cardinal aspect of our republican aim".

During the visit to South Africa by King George VI and his family in 1947, the Afrikaans-language newspaper Die Transvaler, of which Verwoerd was editor, ignored the royal tour, making reference only to "busy streets" in Johannesburg. By contrast, the newspaper of the far-right Ossewa Brandwag openly denounced the tour, proclaiming that "in the name of this monarchy, 27 000 Boer women and children were murdered for the sake of gold and their fatherland".

=== National Party in government ===
In 1948, the National Party, now led by D. F. Malan, came to power, although it did not campaign for a republic during the election, instead favouring remaining in the Commonwealth, thereby appealing to Afrikaners who otherwise might have voted for the United Party of Jan Smuts. This decision to downplay the republic question and focus on race issues was influenced by N C Havenga, the leader of the Afrikaner Party, which was in alliance with the National Party in the election.

Malan's successor as Prime Minister, J G Strijdom, also downplayed the republic issue, stating that no steps would be taken towards that end before 1958. However, he later reaffirmed his party's commitment to a republic, as well as a single national flag. Strijdom stated that the matter of whether South Africa would be a republic inside or outside the Commonwealth would be decided "with a view to circumstances then prevailing". Like his precessor, Strijdom declared the party's belief that a republic could only be proclaimed on the basis "of the broad will of the people".

On becoming Prime Minister in 1958, Verwoerd gave a speech to Parliament in which he declared that:

This has indeed been the basis of our struggle all these years: nationalism against imperialism. This has been the struggle since 1910: a republic as opposed to the monarchical connection... We stand unequivocally and clearly for the establishment of the republic in the correct manner and at the appropriate time.

In 1960, Verwoerd announced plans to hold a whites-only referendum on the establishment of a republic, with a bill to that effect being introduced in Parliament on 23 April of that year. The Referendum Act received assent on 3 June 1960. He stated that a simple majority in favour of the change would be decisive, although minimal changes would be made to the existing constitutional structures.

Before he was succeeded by Verwoerd as Prime Minister in 1958, Strijdom had lowered the voting age for whites from 21 to 18. Afrikaners, who were more likely to favour the National Party than English-speaking whites, were also on average younger than them, with a higher birth rate. Also included on the electoral roll were white voters in South West Africa, now Namibia. As in South Africa, the Afrikaners and ethnic Germans in the territory outnumbered English-speaking whites, and were strong supporters of the National Party. In addition, Coloureds were no longer enfranchised as voters and were not eligible to vote in the referendum.

In hopes of winning the support of those opposed to a republic, not only English-speaking whites but Afrikaners still supporting the United Party, Verwoerd proposed that constitutional changes would be minimal, with the Queen simply being replaced as head of state by a State President, the office of which would be a ceremonial post rather than an executive one.

=== Wind of Change speech ===
Earlier, in February of that year, British Prime Minister Harold Macmillan had given a speech to the Parliament in Cape Town, in which he spoke of the inevitability of decolonisation in Africa, and appeared critical of South Africa's apartheid policies. This prompted Verwoerd to declare in the House of Assembly:

It was not the Republic of South Africa that was told, 'We are not going to support you in this respect.' Those words were addressed to the monarchy of South Africa, and yet we have the same monarch as this person from Britain who addressed these words to us. It was a warning given to all of us, English-speaking and Afrikaans-speaking, republican and anti-republican. It was clear to all of us that as far as these matters are concerned, we shall have to stand on our own feet.

Many English-speaking whites, who had regarded Britain as their spiritual home, felt disillusionment and a sense of loss, including Douglas Edgar Mitchell, the United Party's leader in Natal. Despite his opposition to Verwoerd's plans for a republic, Mitchell spoke in vehement opposition to many points of Macmillan's speech.

=== Opposition to republic in Natal ===
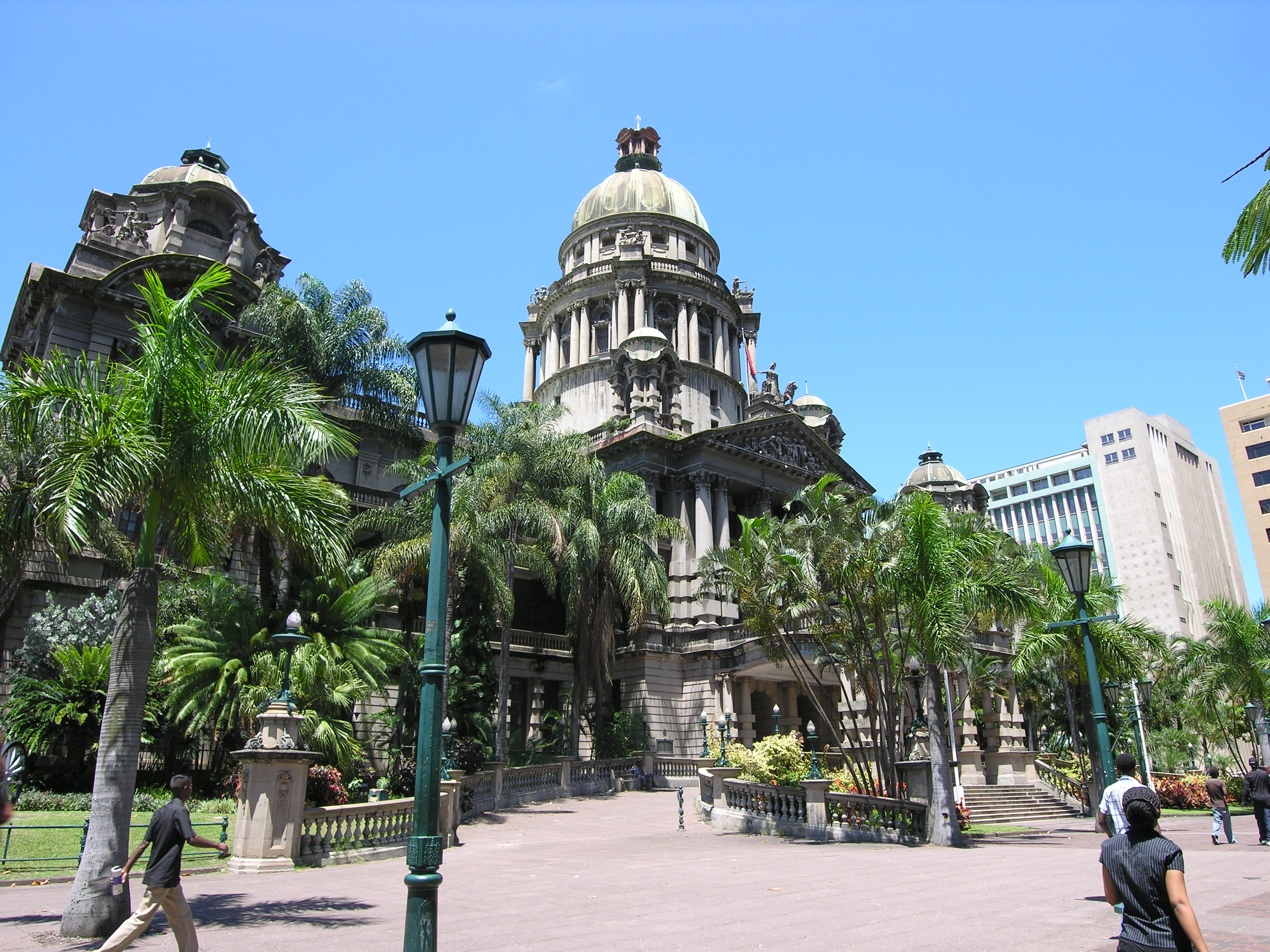
Durban City Hall, where the Natal Covenant was launched in 1955

In Natal, the only province with an English-speaking majority of whites, there was strong anti-republican sentiment; in 1955, the small Federal Party issued a pamphlet The Case Against the Republic, while the Anti-Republican League organised public demonstrations. The League, founded by Arthur Selby, the Federal Party's chairman, launched the Natal Covenant in opposition to the plans for a republic, signed by 33,000 Natalians. Drawing cheering crowds of 2,000 people in Durban and 1,500 in Pietermaritzburg, the League became the largest political organisation in Natal, with 28 branches across the province, with Selby calling for 80,000 signatories to the Covenant. Inspired by the Ulster Covenant of 1912, the Natal Covenant read:

Being convinced in our consciences that a republic would be disastrous to the material well-being of Natal as well as of the whole of South Africa, subversive of our freedom and destructive of our citizenship, we, whose names are underwritten, men and women of Natal, loyal subjects of Her Gracious Majesty Queen Elizabeth the Second, do hereby pledge ourselves in solemn covenant, throughout this our time of threatened calamity, to stand by one another in defending the Crown, and in using all means which may be found possible and necessary to defeat the present intention to set up a republic in South Africa. And in the event of a republic being forced upon us, we further solemnly and mutually pledge ourselves to refuse to recognise its authority. In sure confidence that God will defend the right, we hereto subscribe our names. GOD SAVE THE QUEEN.

On the day of the referendum, the Natal Witness, the province's daily English-language newspaper warned its readers that:

Not to vote against the Republic is to help those who would cut us loose from our moorings, and set us adrift in a treacherous and uncharted sea, at the very time that the winds of change are blowing up to hurricane force.

Between May 1956 and June 1958, the anti-republican Freedom Radio, set up by John Lang, broadcast from the Natal Midlands, later resuming broadcasts shortly before the referendum in October 1960 until the proclamation of the republic in May 1961.

=== Black South African opinion ===
Black South Africans, who were denied a vote in the referendum, were not against the establishment of a republic per se, but saw the new constitution as a direct rejection of the principle of one person, one vote, as expressed in the Freedom Charter, drafted by the African National Congress and its allies in the Congress Alliance. Despite its opposition to the monarchy and the Commonwealth, the ANC sought to mobilise white and black opposition to the republic, seeing it as an attempt by Verwoerd to consolidate the white grip on power.

== Campaign ==
=== "Yes" campaign ===
The pro-republic campaign focused on the need for white unity in the face of British decolonisation in Africa, and the eruption of the former Belgian Congo into bloody civil war following independence, which Verwoerd warned might give rise to similar chaos in South Africa. It also argued that South Africa's links with the British monarchy led to confusion about the country's status, with one advertisement proclaiming: "Let us become a real republic now rather than remain betwixt and between".

One campaign poster used the slogan "To re-unite and keep South Africa white, a republic now" on posters in English, while in Afrikaans, the slogan was Ons republiek nou, om Suid-Afrika blank te hou ("Our republic now, to keep South Africa white"). Another poster featured two clasped hands, with the slogan "Your people, my people, our republic", which would sometimes be vandalised by painting one of the hands black, producing the emblem of the non-racial Liberal Party.

=== "No" campaign ===
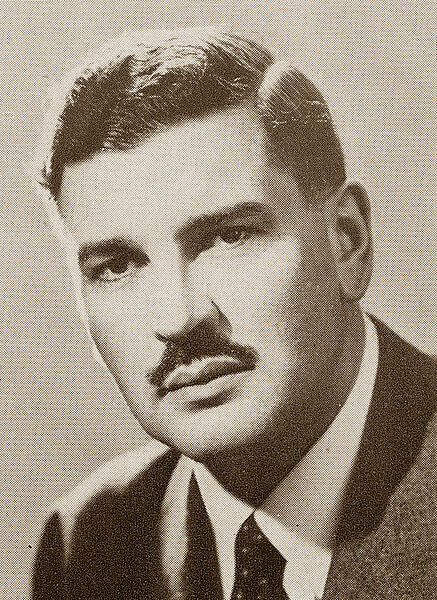
Sir De Villiers Graaff, leader of the United Party, 1960

The opposition United Party actively campaigned for a 'No' vote, arguing that South Africa's membership of the Commonwealth, with which it had privileged trade links, would be threatened and lead to greater isolation. One advertisement pointed out that access to Commonwealth markets was worth £200 000 000 a year. Another proclaimed "You need friends. Don't let Verwoerd lose them all". Sir De Villiers Graaff, the party's leader, called on voters to reject a republic "so we can remain in the British [sic] Commonwealth and have its protection against Communism and hot-eyed African nationalism".

The smaller Progressive Party appealed to supporters of the proposed change to 'reject this republic', arguing that such a weighted electorate could not provide a valid test of opinion. An advertisement appealing to voters who might support a republic declared: "The issue is not monarchy or republic but democracy or dictatorship".

== Results ==
Choice	Votes	%
For	850,458	52.29
Against	775,878	47.71
Total	1,626,336	100.00
Valid votes	1,626,336	99.52
Invalid/blank votes	7,904	0.48
Total votes	1,634,240	100.00
Registered voters/turnout	1,800,426	90.77
Source: Government Gazette

=== By province ===
Province	For		Against		Invalid/ blank	Total	Registered voters	Turnout
Province	Votes	%	Votes	%	Invalid/ blank	Total	Registered voters	Turnout
Cape of Good Hope	271,418	50.15	269,784	49.85	2,881	544,083	591,298	92.02
Natal	42,299	23.78	135,598	76.22	688	178,585	193,103	92.48
Orange Free State	110,171	76.72	33,438	23.28	798	144,407	160,843	89.78
South-West Africa	19,938	62.39	12,017	37.61	280	32,235	37,135	86.80
Transvaal	406,632	55.58	325,041	44.42	3,257	734,930	818,047	89.84
Source: Government Gazette Extraordinary (6557)

=== By electoral division ===
Of the 156 House of Assembly parliamentary constituencies, a majority voted for a republic in 104 (all 103 won by the National Party in the 1958 general election, plus the United Party-held seat of Sunnyside in Pretoria), while a majority voted against in the other 52 (all held by the United Party or the Progressive Party).

Province	Constituency	For		Against		Invalid/ blank	Total	Registered voters (Note: The total number of registered voters for constituencies is one less than the national figure, with the discrepancy in Transvaal Province.)	Turnout
Province	Constituency	Votes	%	Votes	%	Invalid/ blank	Total	Registered voters	Turnout
Cape of Good Hope	Albany	2,448	23.02	8,184	76.98	47	10,679	11,606	92.01
Cape of Good Hope	Aliwal	5,243	58.14	3,775	41.86	53	9,071	9,583	94.66
Cape of Good Hope	Beaufort West	6,223	77.81	1,775	22.19	45	8,043	8,919	90.18
Cape of Good Hope	Bellville	8,387	62.73	4,984	37.27	57	13,428	14,548	92.30
Cape of Good Hope	Ceres	6,596	77.00	1,970	23.00	53	8,619	9,416	91.54
Cape of Good Hope	Constantia	1,638	13.60	10,405	86.40	30	12,073	13,277	90.93
Cape of Good Hope	Cradock	5,615	66.76	2,796	33.24	41	8,452	9,140	92.47
Cape of Good Hope	De Aar—Colesberg	5,846	70.60	2,434	29.40	52	8,332	9,052	92.05
Cape of Good Hope	Fort Beaufort	4,910	55.46	3,943	44.54	52	8,905	9,327	95.48
Cape of Good Hope	George	7,842	76.83	2,365	23.17	51	10,258	10,969	93.52
Cape of Good Hope	Gordonia	5,925	70.72	2,453	29.28	71	8,449	9,289	90.96
Cape of Good Hope	Graaff-Reinet	5,576	68.55	2,558	31.45	66	8,200	8,876	92.38
Cape of Good Hope	Green Point	1,784	16.52	9,018	83.48	39	10,841	12,350	87.78
Cape of Good Hope	Hottentots-Holland	5,688	56.19	4,434	43.81	57	10,179	10,876	93.59
Cape of Good Hope	Humansdorp	6,269	65.04	3,369	34.96	52	9,690	10,298	94.10
Cape of Good Hope	Cape Town Gardens	3,706	31.08	8,217	68.92	47	11,970	13,467	88.88
Cape of Good Hope	Kimberley North	6,438	59.89	4,312	40.11	12	10,762	11,885	90.55
Cape of Good Hope	Kimberley South	6,067	54.33	5,099	45.67	87	11,253	12,292	91.55
Cape of Good Hope	King William's Town	3,104	29.20	7,525	70.80	27	10,656	11,294	94.35
Cape of Good Hope	Kuruman	6,225	69.11	2,782	30.89	50	9,057	9,747	92.92
Cape of Good Hope	Maitland	3,866	35.48	7,029	64.52	44	10,939	12,099	90.41
Cape of Good Hope	Malmesbury	7,463	74.44	2,562	25.56	92	10,117	10,790	93.76
Cape of Good Hope	Moorreesburg	6,636	74.54	2,267	25.46	67	8,970	9,738	92.11
Cape of Good Hope	Mossel Bay	6,939	75.02	2,311	24.98	71	9,321	9,984	93.36
Cape of Good Hope	Namakwaland	6,686	76.51	2,053	23.49	140	8,879	9,912	89.58
Cape of Good Hope	East London North	2,294	18.95	9,812	81.05	116	12,222	12,993	94.07
Cape of Good Hope	East London City	2,662	23.85	8,499	76.15	53	11,214	12,391	90.50
Cape of Good Hope	Oudtshoorn	7,342	78.05	2,065	21.95	73	9,480	10,438	90.82
Cape of Good Hope	Paarl	7,314	69.08	3,273	30.92	81	10,668	11,498	92.78
Cape of Good Hope	Parow	9,300	75.73	2,980	24.27	68	12,348	13,582	90.91
Cape of Good Hope	Pinelands	2,143	18.26	9,593	81.74	16	11,752	12,687	92.63
Cape of Good Hope	Piketberg	7,385	86.04	1,198	13.96	48	8,631	9,286	92.95
Cape of Good Hope	Port Elizabeth North	7,143	57.67	5,244	42.33	61	12,448	13,586	91.62
Cape of Good Hope	Port Elizabeth Central	4,149	36.30	7,280	63.70	43	11,472	12,576	91.22
Cape of Good Hope	Port Elizabeth South	2,645	21.63	9,583	78.37	33	12,261	13,217	92.77
Cape of Good Hope	Port Elizabeth West	3,926	28.17	10,009	71.83	55	13,990	14,734	94.95
Cape of Good Hope	Prieska	5,209	61.12	3,313	38.88	45	8,567	9,154	93.59
Cape of Good Hope	Queenstown	5,257	49.43	5,378	50.57	14	10,649	11,112	95.83
Cape of Good Hope	Rondebosch	1,622	13.43	10,456	86.57	36	12,114	13,301	91.08
Cape of Good Hope	Sea Point	1,077	9.01	10,877	90.99	38	11,992	12,798	93.70
Cape of Good Hope	Simonstown	2,591	21.92	9,229	78.08	57	11,877	13,017	91.24
Cape of Good Hope	Somerset East	6,025	68.87	2,723	31.13	101	8,849	9,375	94.39
Cape of Good Hope	Salt River	1,936	20.85	7,349	79.15	64	9,349	10,610	88.11
Cape of Good Hope	Stellenbosch	8,086	67.82	3,836	32.18	27	11,949	13,194	90.56
Cape of Good Hope	Swellendam	5,602	59.77	3,771	40.23	70	9,443	10,103	93.47
Cape of Good Hope	Transkeian Territories	2,316	25.93	6,616	74.07	103	9,035	9,698	93.16
Cape of Good Hope	Uitenhage	8,938	65.98	4,609	34.02	77	13,624	14,624	93.16
Cape of Good Hope	False Bay	6,517	58.42	4,638	41.58	42	11,197	12,408	90.24
Cape of Good Hope	Vasco	7,138	63.41	4,119	36.59	56	11,313	12,660	89.36
Cape of Good Hope	Vryburg	6,408	68.57	2,937	31.43	59	9,404	10,303	91.27
Cape of Good Hope	Worcester	6,793	66.63	3,402	33.37	20	10,215	11,287	90.50
Cape of Good Hope	Wynberg	2,480	22.85	8,375	77.15	22	10,877	11,932	91.16
Natal	Drakensberg	3,801	41.54	5,349	58.46	50	9,200	9,956	92.41
Natal	Durban—Berea	1,010	8.34	11,098	91.66	22	12,130	12,916	93.91
Natal	Durban—Musgrave	823	6.93	11,053	93.07	42	11,918	12,769	93.34
Natal	Durban North	1,282	10.09	11,426	89.91	27	12,735	13,507	94.28
Natal	Durban Point	1,554	12.33	11,049	87.67	28	12,631	14,156	89.23
Natal	Durban Central	1,445	13.16	9,538	86.84	21	11,004	12,120	90.79
Natal	Durban-Umbilo	1,766	15.62	9,537	84.38	45	11,348	12,386	91.62
Natal	Durban Umlazi	2,706	23.15	8,983	76.85	32	11,721	12,675	92.47
Natal	Natal South Coast	1,669	17.70	7,761	82.30	14	9,444	10,206	92.53
Natal	Newcastle	5,793	59.98	3,865	40.02	54	9,712	10,446	92.97
Natal	Pietermaritzburg District	1,890	17.84	8,705	82.16	84	10,679	11,496	92.89
Natal	Pietermaritzburg City	3,689	29.12	8,978	70.88	84	12,751	13,866	91.96
Natal	Pinetown	1,705	15.90	9,016	84.10	46	10,767	11,520	93.46
Natal	Umhlatuzana	3,887	29.05	9,495	70.95	50	13,432	14,473	92.81
Natal	Vryheid	5,613	63.87	3,175	36.13	55	8,843	9,554	92.56
Natal	Zululand	3,666	35.81	6,570	64.19	34	10,270	11,057	92.88
Orange Free State	Bethlehem	7,689	82.56	1,624	17.44	87	9,400	10,400	90.38
Orange Free State	Bloemfontein District	8,773	84.33	1,630	15.67	29	10,432	11,803	88.38
Orange Free State	Bloemfontein East	8,390	68.12	3,926	31.88	23	12,339	14,438	85.46
Orange Free State	Bloemfontein West	8,468	65.35	4,490	34.65	22	12,980	14,551	89.20
Orange Free State	Fauresmith—Boshof	7,174	82.08	1,566	17.92	45	8,785	9,333	94.13
Orange Free State	Harrismith	6,969	82.04	1,526	17.96	43	8,538	9,195	92.85
Orange Free State	Heilbron	8,328	78.42	2,292	21.58	85	10,705	11,751	91.10
Orange Free State	Kroonstad	7,913	79.11	2,090	20.89	54	10,057	11,057	90.96
Orange Free State	Ladybrand	6,315	76.25	1,967	23.75	146	8,428	9,154	92.07
Orange Free State	Odendaalsrus	8,517	75.11	2,823	24.89	44	11,384	13,277	85.74
Orange Free State	Smithfield	6,997	81.10	1,631	18.90	58	8,686	9,247	93.93
Orange Free State	Vredefort	7,343	81.08	1,713	18.92	45	9,101	10,158	89.59
Orange Free State	Welkom	9,437	67.01	4,647	32.99	50	14,134	16,147	87.53
Orange Free State	Winburg	7,858	83.85	1,513	16.15	67	9,438	10,332	91.35
South-West Africa	Etosha	3,692	70.82	1,521	29.18	55	5,268	6,004	87.74
South-West Africa	Karas	2,933	58.37	2,092	41.63	44	5,069	5,533	91.61
South-West Africa	Middelland	3,347	61.09	2,132	38.91	36	5,515	6,247	88.28
South-West Africa	Namib	2,911	59.35	1,994	40.65	51	4,956	5,600	88.50
South-West Africa	Omaruru	3,341	65.79	1,737	34.21	45	5,123	6,063	84.50
South-West Africa	Windhoek	3,714	59.38	2,541	40.62	49	6,304	7,688	82.00
Transvaal	Alberton	8,154	68.48	3,753	31.52	32	11,939	13,457	88.72
Transvaal	Benoni	4,400	40.38	6,497	59.62	36	10,933	12,266	89.13
Transvaal	Bethal-Middelburg	5,977	66.35	3,031	33.65	54	9,062	9,897	91.56
Transvaal	Bezuidenhout	2,279	21.44	8,352	78.56	35	10,666	12,031	88.65
Transvaal	Boksburg	6,871	54.22	5,801	45.78	63	12,735	13,798	92.30
Transvaal	Brakpan	6,796	61.72	4,215	38.28	22	11,033	12,496	88.29
Transvaal	Brits	7,038	77.67	2,023	22.33	81	9,142	10,018	91.26
Transvaal	Christiana	6,760	73.17	2,479	26.83	68	9,307	9,931	93.72
Transvaal	Edenvale	7,265	59.26	4,994	40.74	46	12,305	13,932	88.32
Transvaal	Ermelo	5,745	64.30	3,190	35.70	100	9,035	9,907	91.20
Transvaal	Florida	4,808	40.00	7,212	60.00	16	12,036	12,823	93.86
Transvaal	Geduld	7,640	64.07	4,284	35.93	40	11,964	13,520	88.49
Transvaal	Germiston	6,848	66.87	3,393	33.13	53	10,294	11,940	86.21
Transvaal	Germiston District	3,972	33.11	8,026	66.89	62	12,060	13,353	90.32
Transvaal	Groblersdal	7,129	79.98	1,784	20.02	56	8,969	9,811	91.42
Transvaal	Heidelberg	7,072	72.95	2,622	27.05	39	9,733	10,880	89.46
Transvaal	Hercules	9,502	84.92	1,687	15.08	30	11,219	13,095	85.67
Transvaal	Hillbrow	1,285	11.64	9,757	88.36	33	11,075	12,683	87.32
Transvaal	Hospital	2,162	23.78	6,929	76.22	30	9,121	11,012	82.83
Transvaal	Houghton	1,153	9.85	10,555	90.15	31	11,739	12,721	92.28
Transvaal	Innesdal	8,283	72.70	3,110	27.30	26	11,419	12,566	90.87
Transvaal	Jeppes	3,259	33.54	6,459	66.46	47	9,765	11,647	83.84
Transvaal	Johannesburg North	1,488	12.26	10,652	87.74	23	12,163	13,067	93.08
Transvaal	Kempton Park	8,577	66.97	4,231	33.03	68	12,876	14,276	90.19
Transvaal	Kensington	1,824	16.54	9,207	83.46	15	11,046	12,130	91.06
Transvaal	Klerksdorp	9,452	70.17	4,018	29.83	19	13,489	15,192	88.79
Transvaal	Krugersdorp	7,107	63.95	4,007	36.05	66	11,180	12,787	87.43
Transvaal	Langlaagte	6,853	61.76	4,244	38.24	50	11,147	12,340	90.33
Transvaal	Lichtenburg	7,333	79.55	1,885	20.45	31	9,249	10,094	91.63
Transvaal	Losberg	6,231	63.87	3,525	36.13	73	9,829	10,864	90.47
Transvaal	Lydenburg—Barberton	5,589	65.35	2,964	34.65	130	8,683	9,558	90.85
Transvaal	Maraisburg	7,412	70.81	3,055	29.19	41	10,508	12,332	85.21
Transvaal	Marico	5,756	68.56	2,640	31.44	39	8,435	9,073	92.97
Transvaal	Mayfair	6,278	65.49	3,308	34.51	74	9,660	11,256	85.82
Transvaal	Nelspruit	6,359	66.21	3,246	33.79	18	9,623	10,548	91.23
Transvaal	Nigel	6,883	64.74	3,749	35.26	29	10,661	11,660	91.43
Transvaal	North East Rand	2,875	24.29	8,959	75.71	32	11,866	12,805	92.67
Transvaal	North West Rand	6,700	57.42	4,969	42.58	37	11,706	12,711	92.09
Transvaal	Orange Grove	889	7.42	11,086	92.58	51	12,026	12,671	94.91
Transvaal	Parktown	1,038	8.89	10,640	91.11	29	11,707	12,491	93.72
Transvaal	Pietersburg	6,925	74.67	2,349	25.33	71	9,345	10,440	89.51
Transvaal	Potchefstroom	8,288	74.13	2,893	25.87	77	11,258	12,767	88.18
Transvaal	Pretoria District	7,086	65.28	3,768	34.72	33	10,887	11,845	91.91
Transvaal	Pretoria East	9,834	69.65	4,286	30.35	44	14,164	15,537	91.16
Transvaal	Pretoria—Rissik	5,664	44.89	6,954	55.11	26	12,644	13,848	91.31
Transvaal	Pretoria Central	6,958	71.46	2,779	28.54	14	9,751	11,607	84.01
Transvaal	Pretoria—Sunnyside	7,774	57.59	5,724	42.41	42	13,540	15,080	89.79
Transvaal	Pretoria West	8,453	75.12	2,799	24.88	54	11,306	13,324	84.85
Transvaal	Prinshof	7,709	67.28	3,749	32.72	35	11,493	13,540	84.88
Transvaal	Randfontein	6,918	64.37	3,830	35.63	77	10,825	11,911	90.88
Transvaal	Roodepoort	8,074	66.18	4,126	33.82	49	12,249	13,314	92.00
Transvaal	Rosettenville	2,631	22.95	8,833	77.05	46	11,510	12,834	89.68
Transvaal	Rustenburg	6,398	68.26	2,975	31.74	45	9,418	10,323	91.23
Transvaal	Soutpansberg	6,859	73.52	2,470	26.48	74	9,403	10,332	91.01
Transvaal	Springs	4,525	39.08	7,053	60.92	73	11,651	12,790	91.09
Transvaal	Standerton	6,003	64.00	3,376	36.00	66	9,445	10,286	91.82
Transvaal	Turffontein	3,974	35.06	7,360	64.94	70	11,404	12,772	89.29
Transvaal	Vanderbijl Park	9,497	74.63	3,229	25.37	35	12,761	13,877	91.96
Transvaal	Ventersdorp	6,695	67.64	3,203	32.36	91	9,989	11,026	90.59
Transvaal	Vereeniging	6,833	57.63	5,024	42.37	55	11,912	12,948	92.00
Transvaal	Von Brandis	2,319	24.54	7,131	75.46	50	9,500	11,210	84.75
Transvaal	Wakketstroom	6,443	73.22	2,357	26.78	63	8,863	9,545	92.85
Transvaal	Waterberg	7,576	85.97	1,236	14.03	38	8,850	9,652	91.69
Transvaal	Westdene	6,960	65.09	3,733	34.91	28	10,721	11,936	89.82
Transvaal	Witbank	6,439	68.07	3,020	31.93	34	9,493	10,683	88.86
Transvaal	Wolmaransstad	7,192	74.98	2,400	25.02	29	9,621	10,564	91.07
Transvaal	Wonderboom	8,368	82.74	1,746	17.26	70	10,184	11,667	87.29
Transvaal	Yeoville	1,195	10.58	10,100	89.42	43	11,338	12,749	88.93

== Aftermath ==
=== White reaction ===
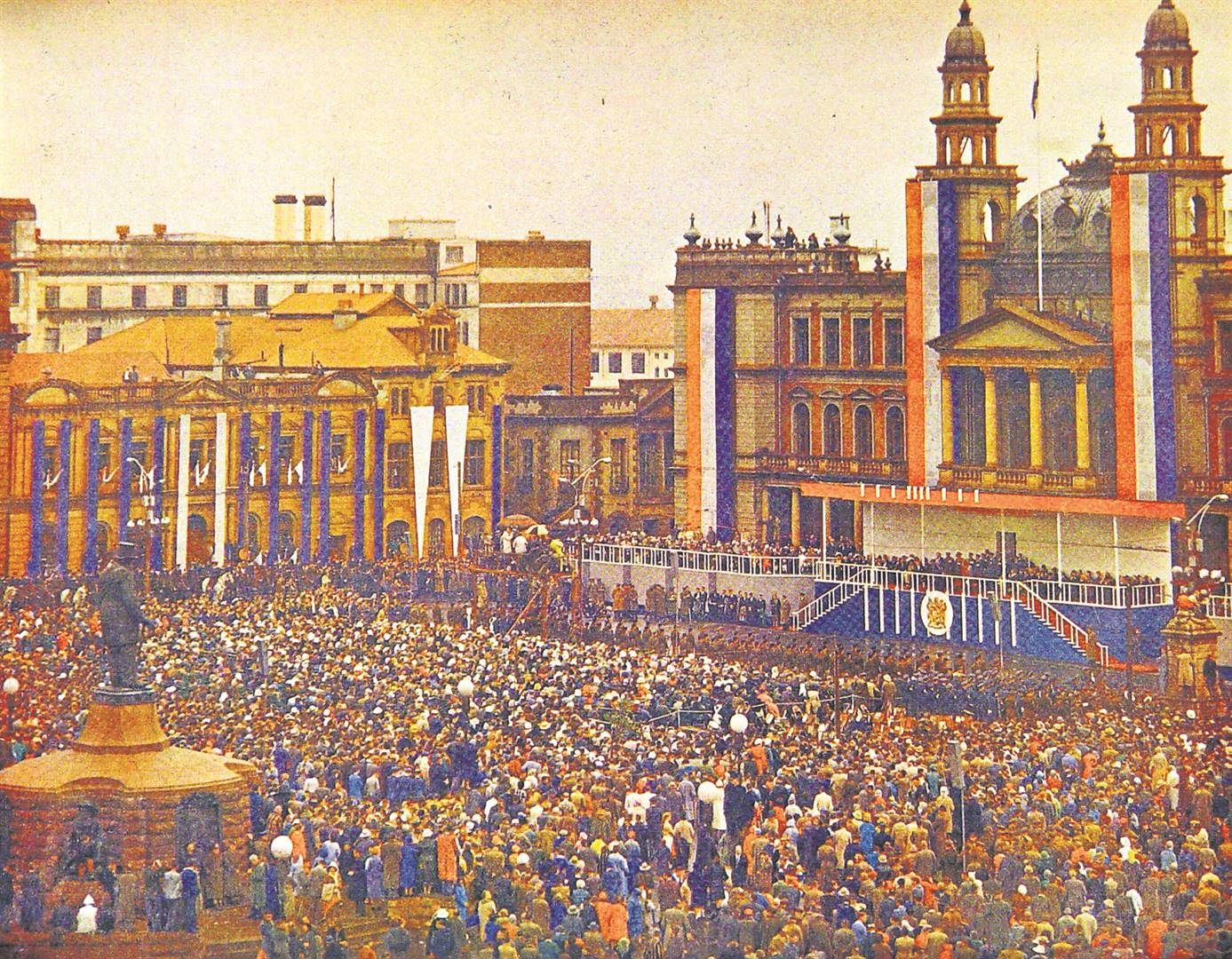
Celebrations in Pretoria, 31 May 1961.

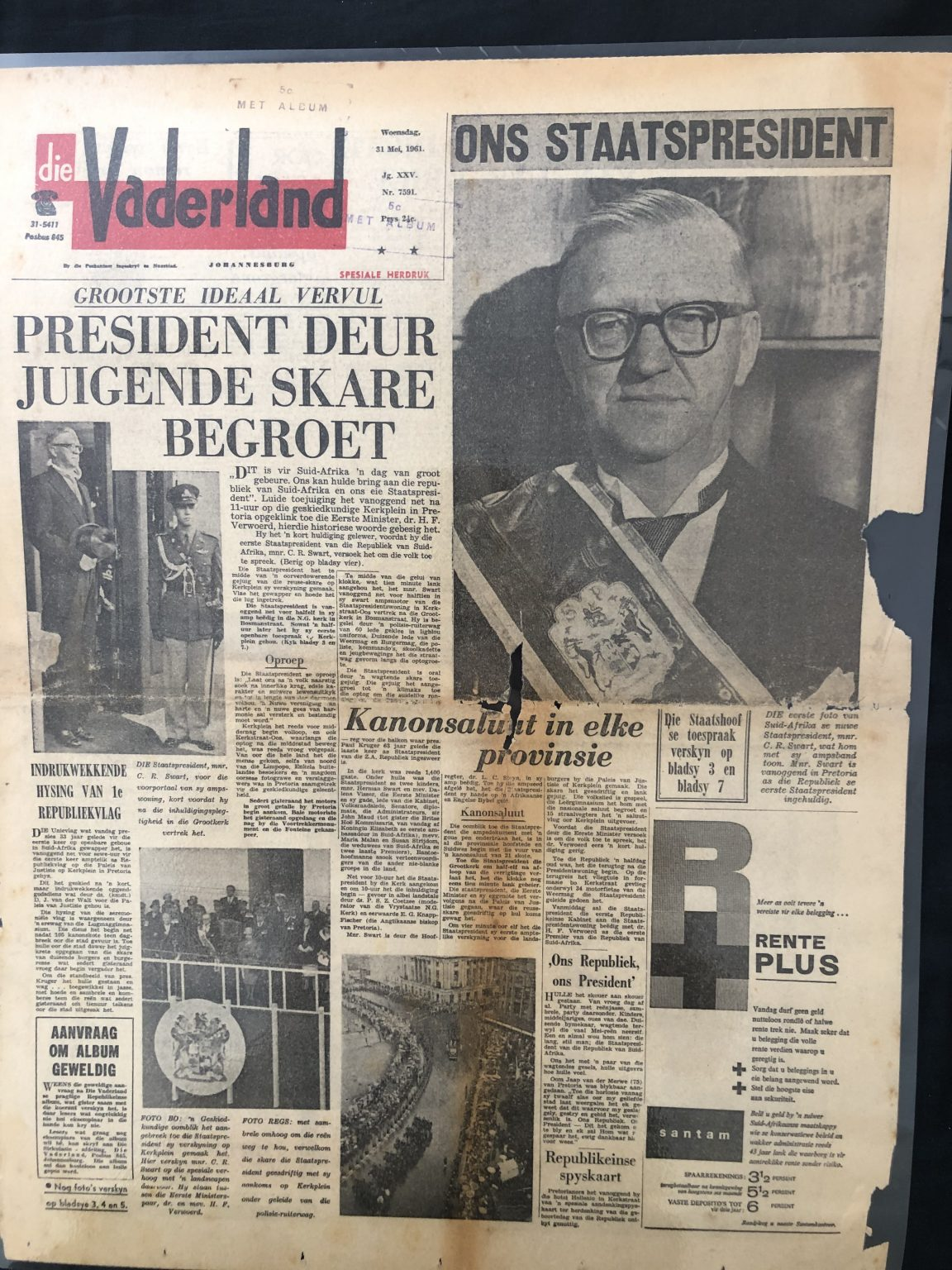
Die Vaderland special issue, 31 May 1961.

Whites in the former Boer republics of the Transvaal and Orange Free State voted decisively in favour, as did those in South West Africa. On the eve of the establishment of the republic, Die Transvaler proclaimed:

Our republic is the inevitable fulfilment of God's plan for our people... a plan formed in 1652 when Jan van Riebeeck arrived at the Cape... for which the defeat of our republics in 1902 was a necessary step.

In the Cape Province there was a smaller majority, despite the removal of the Cape Coloured franchise, while Natal voted overwhelmingly against; in the constituencies of Durban North, Pinetown and Durban Musgrave, the vote against a republic was 89.7, 83.7 and 92.7 per cent respectively. Following the referendum result, Douglas Mitchell, the leader of the United Party in Natal, declared:

We in Natal will have no part or parcel of this Republic. We must resist, resist, and resist it - and the Nationalist Government. I have contracted Natal out of a republic on the strongest possible moral grounds that I can enunciate.

Mitchell led a delegation from Natal seeking greater autonomy for the province, but without success. Other whites in Natal went as far as to call for secession from the Union, along with some parts of the eastern Cape Province. However, Mitchell rejected the idea of independence as "suicide", although he did not rule out asking for it in the future.

In a conciliatory gesture to English-speaking whites, and a recognition that some had supported him in the referendum, Verwoerd appointed two English-speaking members to his cabinet.

=== Black reaction ===
On 25 March 1961, in response to the referendum, the ANC held an All-In African Congress in Pietermaritzburg attended by 1398 delegates from all over the country. It passed a resolution declaring that "no Constitution or form of Government decided without the participation of the African people who form an absolute majority of the population can enjoy moral validity or merit support either within South Africa or beyond its borders".

It called for a National Convention, and the organising of mass demonstrations on the eve of what Nelson Mandela described as "the unwanted republic", if the government failed to call one. He wrote:

The adoption of this part of the resolution did not mean that conference preferred a monarchy to a republican form of government. Such considerations were unimportant and irrelevant. The point at issue, and which was emphasised over and over again by delegates, was that a minority Government had decided to proclaim a White Republic under which the living conditions of the African people would continue to deteriorate.

A three-day general strike was called in protest at the declaration of a republic, but Verwoerd responded by cancelling all police leaves, calling up 5,000 armed reservists of the Citizen Force, and ordering the arrest of thousands in black townships, although Mandela, by now head of the underground movement, managed to escape arrest.

=== Commonwealth reaction ===
Originally every independent country in the Commonwealth was a Dominion with the British monarch as head of state. The 1949 London Declaration prior to India becoming a republic allowed countries with a different head of state to join or remain in the Commonwealth, but only by unanimous consent of the other members. The governments of Pakistan (in 1956) and, later, Ghana (in 1960) availed themselves of this principle, and the National Party had not ruled out South Africa's continued membership of the Commonwealth were there a vote in favour of a republic.

However, the Commonwealth by 1960 included new Asian and African members, whose rulers saw the apartheid state's membership as an affront to the organisation's new democratic principles. Julius Nyerere, then Chief Minister of Tanganyika, indicated that his country, which was due to gain independence in 1961, would not join the Commonwealth were apartheid South Africa to remain a member. A Commonwealth Prime Ministers' Conference was convened in March 1961, a year ahead of schedule, to address the issue. In response, Verwoerd stirred up a confrontation, causing many members to threaten to withdraw if South Africa's renewal of membership application was accepted. As a result, South Africa's membership application was withdrawn, meaning that upon its becoming a republic on 31 May 1961, the country's Commonwealth membership simply lapsed.

Many Afrikaners welcomed this as a clean break with the colonial past, along with the recreation of the Boer republics on a larger scale. By contrast, Sir De Villiers Graaff remarked "how utterly alone and isolated our country has become", and called for another referendum on the republic issue, arguing that the end to Commonwealth membership had dramatically changed the situation. Commenting on the enthusiastic welcome Verwoerd received from his supporters on his return, Douglas Mitchell remarked "They are cheering because we have withdrawn from the world. Will they cheer when the world withdraws from us?"

In a speech made following the announcement, Verwoerd said:

I appeal to the English-speaking people of South Africa not to allow themselves to be hurt, though I can feel their sadness. A framework has fallen away, but what is of greater importance is friendship and getting together as one nation – as white people who have to defend their future together. Now there is a chance of standing together – one free country standing together on a basis which is the desire of friendship with Great Britain.

Following the end of apartheid, South Africa rejoined the Commonwealth, thirty-three years to the day that the republic was established.

== Establishment of Republic ==
=== Inauguration of State President ===
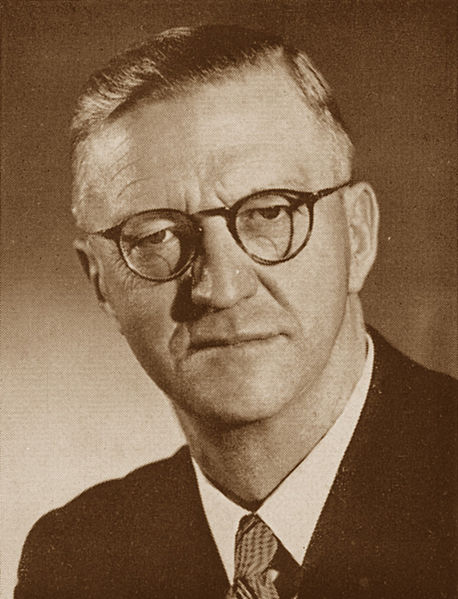
C.R. Swart, last Governor General and first State President

The Republic of South Africa was declared on 31 May 1961, Queen Elizabeth II ceased to be head of state, and the last Governor General of the Union, Charles R. Swart, took office as the first State President. Swart had been elected as State President by Parliament by 139 votes to 71, defeating H A Fagan, the former Chief Justice, favoured by the Opposition.

=== Legal and heraldic changes ===
Other symbolic changes also occurred:

- Legal references to "the Crown" were replaced by those to "the State".
- Oaths of allegiance were no longer to the Queen, but to the Republic of South Africa.
- Queen's Counsels became known as Senior Counsels.
- The "Royal" title was dropped from the names of some South African Army regiments, such as the Natal Carbineers. However, some institutions retained the "Royal" title, such as the Royal Natal National Park and the Royal Society of South Africa
- The mace in the House of Assembly, featuring the Crown at its head, was replaced by a new mace with the coats of arms of the four provinces, as well as sailing ships and ox wagons.

Despite the change to republican status, the coat of arms of Natal continued to display a crown, which had only been added to the arms in 1954, although this was neither the St Edward's Crown, with which the Queen had been crowned, nor the Tudor Crown, used by previous British monarchs, but a distinctive design.

Other references to the monarchy had been removed before the establishment of a republic:

- In 1952, the title of South African Navy vessels HMSAS (His Majesty's South African Ship) had been changed to SAS (South African Ship)
- In 1957, the Crown had been removed from the badges of the defence force and police, or replaced with the Union Lion from the crest of the country's coat of arms
- In 1958, the inscription '"O.H.M.S." (On Her Majesty's Service), used on official mail, was replaced with "On Government Service".

The new decimalised currency, the Rand, which did not feature the Queen's portrait on either notes or coinage, had been introduced on 14 February 1961, three months before the establishment of the Republic. Prior to its introduction, the government considered removing the Queen's head from the coinage of the South African pound.

=== Constitutional changes ===
The most notable difference between the Constitution of the Republic and that of the Union was that the State President was the ceremonial head of state, in place of the Queen and Governor-General. The title of "State President" (Staatspresident in Afrikaans) was previously used for the heads of state of both the South African Republic and the Orange Free State.

The National Party decided against having an executive presidency, instead adopting a minimalist approach, as a conciliatory gesture to whites who were opposed to a republic; the office did not become an executive post until 1984. Similarly, the Union Jack remained a feature of the country's flag until 1994, despite its unpopularity among many Afrikaners, and a proposal to adopt a new design on the tenth anniversary of the republic in 1971.

Under the new Constitution, Afrikaans and English remained official languages, but the status of Afrikaans in relation to Dutch was altered; whereas the South Africa Act had made Dutch an official language alongside English, with Dutch defined to include Afrikaans under the Official Languages of the Union Act in 1925, the 1961 Constitution reversed this by making Afrikaans an official language alongside English, defining Afrikaans to include Dutch.

=== Public holidays ===
The change in South Africa's constitutional status also resulted in changes to the country's public holidays, with the Queen's Birthday, commemorated on the second Monday in July, being replaced by Family Day, while Union Day, commemorating the establishment of the Union on 31 May, became Republic Day. Empire Day, which was commemorated on 24 May, but had come to be seen as an anachronism, had been abolished in 1952.
