= Oggendblad =

Afrikaans morning newspaper in Pretoria from 1972 to 1983

- Type: Morning newspaper
- Owner: Perskor
- Publisher: Perskor
- Founded: 1972
- Ceased publication: 1983
- Political alignment: Afrikaner nationalism
- Language: Afrikaans
- Headquarters: Pretoria

Oggendblad was an Afrikaans-language morning newspaper in Pretoria from 1 November 1972 to 19 February 1983.

== History ==
=== Pakendorf and du Plessis ===
First published by Oggendbladpers Bpk. and then by Perskor. Harald Pakendorf was the founding editor until 1979, after which he was editor of Die Vaderland until 1986. Thys Human took over as editor of Oggendblad in 1979 and was editor until the newspaper's closure in 1983.

The Afrikaans singer and songwriter Koos du Plessis was one of the first members of the editorial board.

=== Legal battle and demise ===
Oggendblad came to an end after a fierce press battle in the then Transvaal between Perskor's four dailies, but especially Die Transvaler, and Nasionale Pers' Beeld, which was established in 1974. The main reason why Perskor established Oggendblad was because the company knew about Naspers' plan with Beeld and therefore wanted to get a head start in the market by being the first to come up with an Afrikaans morning paper aimed at Pretoria.

Because the battle cost both companies millions of rand and Naspers filed a huge claim against Perskor over a tampering with sales figures by Marius Jooste, managing director of Perskor, they reached an agreement. From the second week in February 1983, Die Transvaler moved as an afternoon paper to Pretoria, where Oggendblad (which from July to December 1981 could only sell 5 828 newspapers on weekdays) and its afternoon paper, Hoofstad (which sold 13 628 newspapers on weekdays in the same period, compared to the English-language Pretoria News' 24 876 on weekdays), were incorporated into Die Transvaler.

=== Outcome ===
This left Beeld as the only Afrikaans morning newspaper in Johannesburg, although it was also distributed in Pretoria and elsewhere in the Transvaal, and Die Vaderland as Johannesburg's Afrikaans afternoon newspaper. After Die Transvaler and Die Vaderland were readmitted to the Circulation Bureau (ABC), their weekday sales figures for the period July to December 1981 were 44,109 and 40,998 respectively, compared to Beeld's 67,963. The Rand Daily Mail fell back to 106,759 during that period, 5,000 fewer than the two other Afrikaans morning newspapers, but it was not until 1988 that Beeld was able to maintain a circulation of more than 100,000 for a full year on its own.

On 10 February 1983 Die Vaderland wrote that the market division was inevitable. "It was a rational and logical step and it was done in the broad interest of Transvaal Afrikaners. Just over five years later, further rationalization came when Die Vaderland ceased to exist in October 1988 after 52 years and was merged with Die Transvaler. This newspaper also disappeared five years later. Although Beeld was able to maintain a circulation of more than 100 000 for a long time, the newspaper could never come anywhere close to the combined circulation of the then five Afrikaans dailies in the Transvaal of more than 170 000.
