= Paul Xiniwe =

South African entrepreneur, educator and political activist

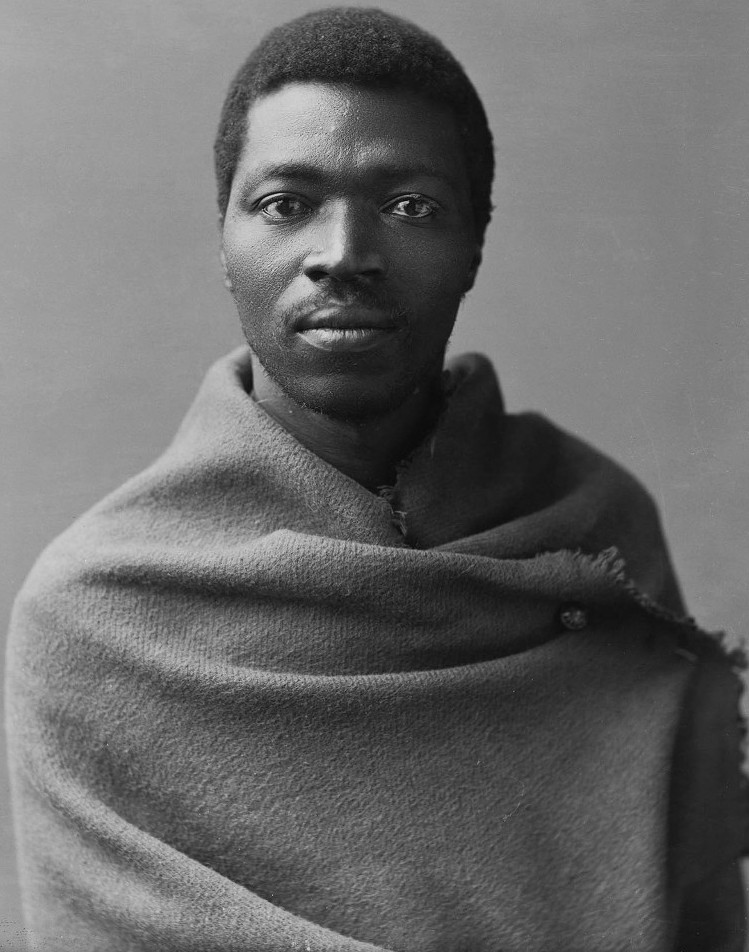
- Xiniwe in 1891
- Born: November 1857; Bedford, Cape Colony
- Died: 30 March 1902 (aged 44); Cape Colony
- Occupations: Entrepreneur, educator, political activist
- Known for: Founder of the Temperance Hotel; early Black political activism
- Spouse: Eleanor Ndwanya
- Children: 5

Paul Xiniwe (November 1857 – 30 March 1902) was a South African entrepreneur, educator, and political activist in the Cape Colony. He is best known as the founder of the Temperance Hotel in King William's Town (now Qonce), one of the earliest hotels established and operated by a Black South African, and for his involvement in early Black political organizations in the Eastern Cape.

== Personal life and education ==
Xiniwe was born in November 1857 to Christian parents Fityi and Boy Xiniwe in Bedford, a city in the Eastern Cape region of the Cape Colony. During his youth, he worked for an English family to help his mother pay for the cost of his education. At the age of 15, he left school and began working in the Telegraph Department of Graaff-Reinet as a lineworker and later worked as a railway timekeeper.

In January 1881, he enrolled at Lovedale Missionary Institute, a prominent mission institution that produced many African intellectuals and leaders. He completed his studies there and qualified as a teacher in 1883.

Xiniwe married Eleanor Ndwanya, a musician and businesswoman who played an active role in their commercial enterprises, on June 17, 1885. The couple had three sons and two daughters, including Bertram Buxton Xiniwe, who later became a member of the Natives Representative Council, Mercy Gladys Xiniwe, the wife of Benjamin Tyamzashe, and Frances Mabel Maud Xiniwe, the wife of TD Mweli Skota.

== Career ==
=== Teaching ===
After graduating from Lovedale, Xiniwe became a teacher at Edwards Memorial School in Port Elizabeth. His school gained a reputation for high educational standards during his tenure.

=== Business activities ===
Xiniwe later resigned from teaching to pursue business ventures. He invested in property and established several general merchant stores in East London, Port Elizabeth, and King William's Town. In 1894, he bought a building for 2,000 pounds, and opened the Temperance Hotel in King William's Town. The hotel became an important social and cultural center for Africans in the town, and was notable at a time when Black South Africans faced significant restrictions in commercial ownership. Xiniwe was regarded as a pioneer of Black entrepreneurship in the Cape Colony.

=== African Choir tour ===
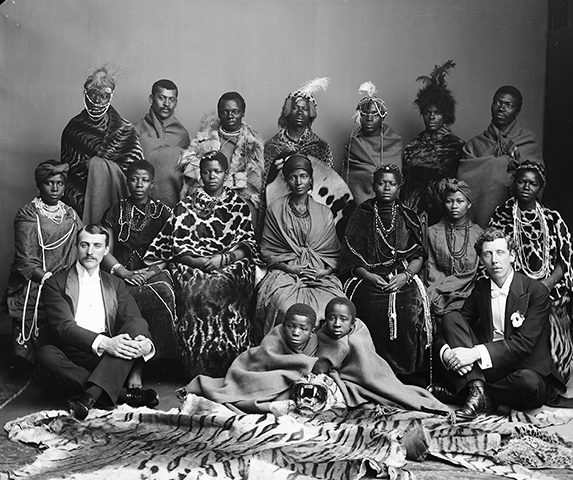
The African Choir in 1891

Paul Xiniwe and his wife Eleanor were members of the African Choir, a group of educated South Africans who toured Britain between 1891 and 1893. The choir sang both Christian hymns and traditional African music, and sought to raise awareness and financial support for a new technical college in the Cape Colony. In 1891, the Choir performed for Queen Victoria at Osborne House.

=== Political and social involvement ===
Xiniwe was actively involved in early Black political and civic organizations. In 1887, he served as an executive member of Imbumba Eliso Lomzi Yabantsundu (Union of Native Vigilance Associations), a pioneering political conference founded by fellow activist John Tengo Jabavu, who served as its general secretary. Imbuba brought together African organizations in King William's Town.

He also participated in educational and political forums advocating for African political representation and civil rights. In 1884, he presented a paper at the Native Educational Society addressing African participation in parliamentary processes. His work formed part of the broader foundation of organized African political consciousness in South Africa.

Xiniwe, alongside many other political activists, helped to found the Eagle Printing Company, responsible for printing Izwi Labantu, the newspaper of the political organization Ingqungqutela. Denver Webb noted that Ingqungqutela was a "rival association" to Imbuba and its associated newspaper Imvo Zabantsundu, and commented that Xiniwe's support of the former was representative of "a split in the relationship between Jabavu and Xiniwe". Following additional funding from Cecil John Rhodes, the newspaper would first be published in November 1897, and Xiniwe would become the first chairman of the Eagle Printing Company.

== Death and legacy ==
Paul Xiniwe died of tuberculosis on 30 March 1902 at the age of 44. After his death, his wife Eleanor took over managing the family's businesses, including the Temperance Hotel. His contributions to Black entrepreneurship, education, and early political organization have since been recognized as part of the broader history of African leadership in the Eastern Cape, and his Temperance Hotel and civic activities remain significant examples of African self-determination and enterprise in the late nineteenth century.
