= Koos du Plessis =

South African singer-songwriter (1945–1984)

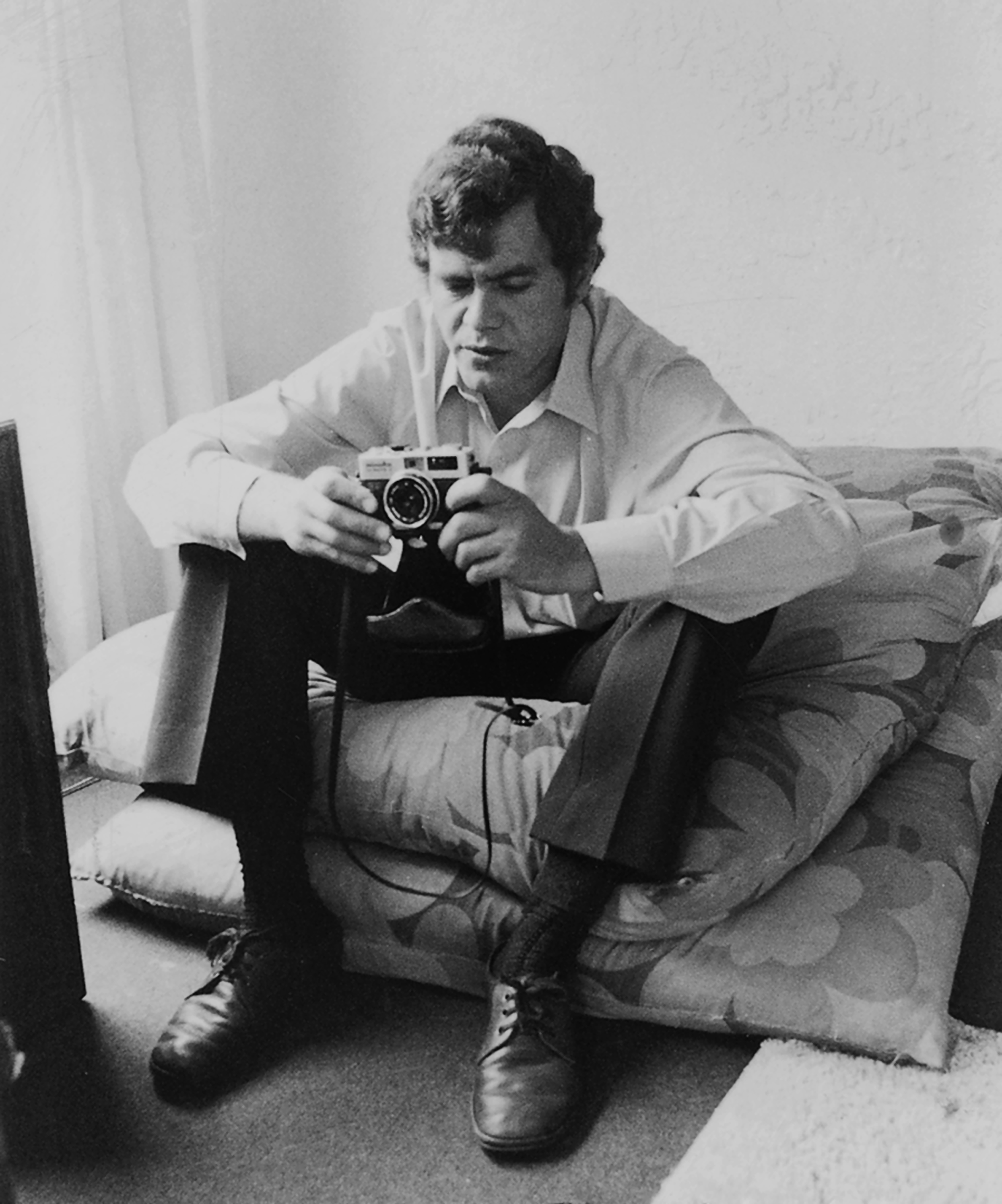
Koos du Plessis

Jacobus (Koos) Johannes du Plessis (10 May 1945 – 15 January 1984) was a prominent South African singer-songwriter and poet, colloquially known as Koos Doep. Although he received critical acclaim for much of his work, he became best known for the runaway success of a rendition of his song "Kinders van die Wind" ("Children of the Wind") by Laurika Rauch.

Koos du Plessis was born in Rustenburg. He was the oldest of 5 children, and grew up in the mining town of Springs. After school, he attended the University of Pretoria, and the University of the Witwatersrand, majoring in Afrikaans-Nederlands (Afrikaans-Dutch). At university he met his future wife, Mornay. The couple had three daughters, Irma, Karien and Karla. Koos would eventually write a song for each of these four women in his life.

Koos worked as journalist and editor for several Afrikaans publications (Oggendblad, Die Vaderland, Die Nataller and Die Transvaler). He died in a motorcar accident close to Krugersdorp during the early morning hours of 15 January 1984.

== Legacy in Afrikaans ==
In 2010, two Koos du Plessis tribute albums were released in The Netherlands posthumously. First was Ofschaaid Zunder Woorden, an album with songs of Du Plessis sung in Grunnegs by Wia Buze and Klaas Spekken. Karla du Plessis joined for a special duet on this album. Second was Die Land Van Blou Saffiere(The Land of Blue Sapphires), released in the Tussen Kontinente-series. This release was a hardcover book that included a biography, lyrics with footnotes and explanations and a CD with 20 of his songs. He wrote two religious songs: Gebed (Prayer: Let me never leave this ground, let me in thy shadow stay...) and a carol Somerkersfees (Summer Christmas). The latter was incorporated into the hymnals of several Afrikaans churches.

== Published works ==
- Erfdeel (2004) ISBN 1-919980-20-2
- Om jou verlaas te groet: nagelate verse (1985) ISBN 0-7981-1871-7
- Skink nog ʾn uur in my awe JD jy dink mos ek lieg : nagelate verse (1995) ISBN 1-874901-41-4

== Discography ==
- Ofschaaid Zunder Woorden (2010)
- Die Land van Blou Saffiere (2010) ISBN 978-90-815659-1-2
- "Die Vierde Horison" (2004) Trio Records INH CD 009
- "Skadu's Teen Die Muur..." (1979) Trio Records INHCD 005

== See also ==
- List of Afrikaans singers
- List of South African musicians
