= Dutch Reformed Church, Adelaide =

Church in Adelaide, South Africa

Dutch Reformed Church
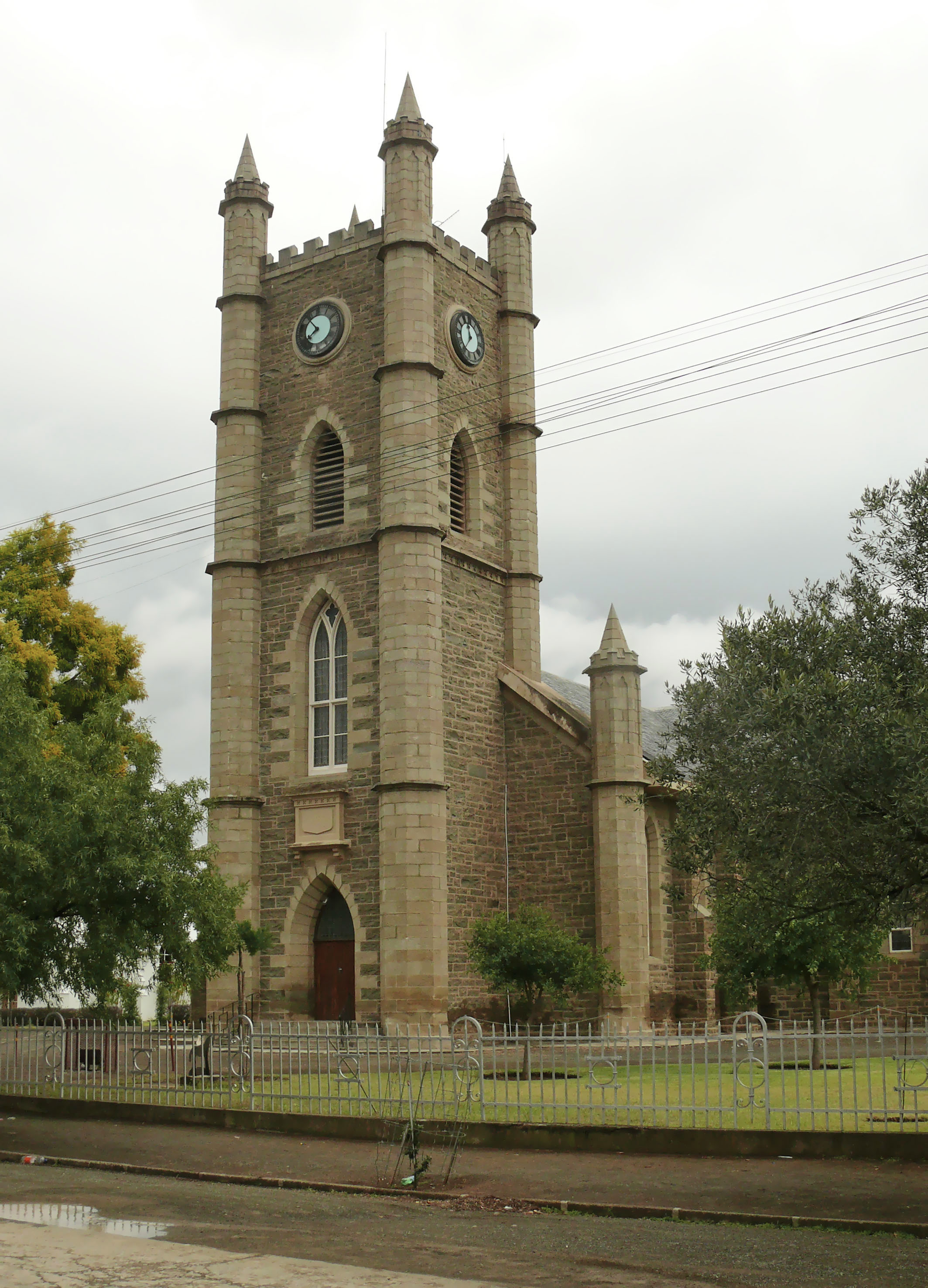
- Location: Adelaide
- Country: South Africa
- Denomination: Nederduits Gereformeerde Kerk

History
- Founded: 1890

Architecture
- Functional status: Church

The Dutch Reformed Church in Adelaide is a congregation of the Dutch Reformed Church in the Synod of the Eastern Cape.

== Background ==
Like its mother congregation, Glen Lynden, the history of the Adelaide congregation is probably the most complicated in the Dutch Reformed Church. Since a decade or two after the separation of Glen Lynden in 1827 from the Somerset East Reformed Church, there had always been difficulty with regard to the Church Farm, because the congregation consisted of three core points, namely the village of Bedford (which was only laid out around 1853), Glen Lynden (the original centre) and Adelaide. Rev. John Pears was confirmed as the first minister at Glen Lynden on 1 May 1829. However, he left the following year to accept a professorship in Cape Town. Discouraged by his gloomy report on Glen Lynden, where he found it impossible to build up a congregation with farmers who were not interested in the church, the government did not send Rev. Alexander Welsh as his successor until 1833.

Meanwhile, the deputy governor of the Eastern Province, Sir Andries Stockenström, also tried to help out of the trouble. On the orders of Governor Sir Lowry Cole, he proclaimed the farm Glen Lynden as church parish property in March 1830. The trouble with Glen Lynden was so serious that on 9 June 1830, Stockenström, as an authority in the Eastern Province, recommended that Glen Lynden be abandoned and the farm Koonapspos (later Adelaide) should be taken as the centre for the parish. After Rev. Piers' resignation, Stockenström lost all interest in the matter and left it there. When the parish of Glen Lynden learned with the vacancy that the governor disapproved of their existence on Glen Lynden, Elder Robert Hart and other interested parties came up with a new proposal. They recommended that Stockenström should give a piece of his farm Maasstroom (later the village of Bedford) for a parish centre. He hesitated at first, but later agreed. This plan also failed. In a letter that Thomas Pringle immediately wrote to him about the matter, he rebuked him and Robert Hart for wanting to undermine Glen Lynden in order to increase Maasstroom's value. An angry letter from Sir Andries, as only he could write it, was the answer. And with this the plan was also off the rails.

== Ministers ==
- Andries Francois Malan, 1890 - 1899 (first pastor)
- Joachim Hermanus van Wyk, 1899 - 1921 (emeritus; died on 16 September 1943)
- Andries Hendrik Naudé, 1922 - 1931
- Izak Jacob Viljoen, 1931 - 1940
- Johannes Gert Stefanus van Jaarsveld, 1940 - 1945
- Hendrik Lodewyk Pepler, 1945 - 1954
- Petrus Johannes Perold de Beer, 1964 - 1966
- Jacobus Johannes Badenhorst, 1966 - 1984 (emeritus; from 1978 also missionary congregation Adelaide-Bedford)
- Paul Coenraad Pieter Arnoldus Odendaal, 2014 - present
