= Adelaide, South Africa =

Adelaide
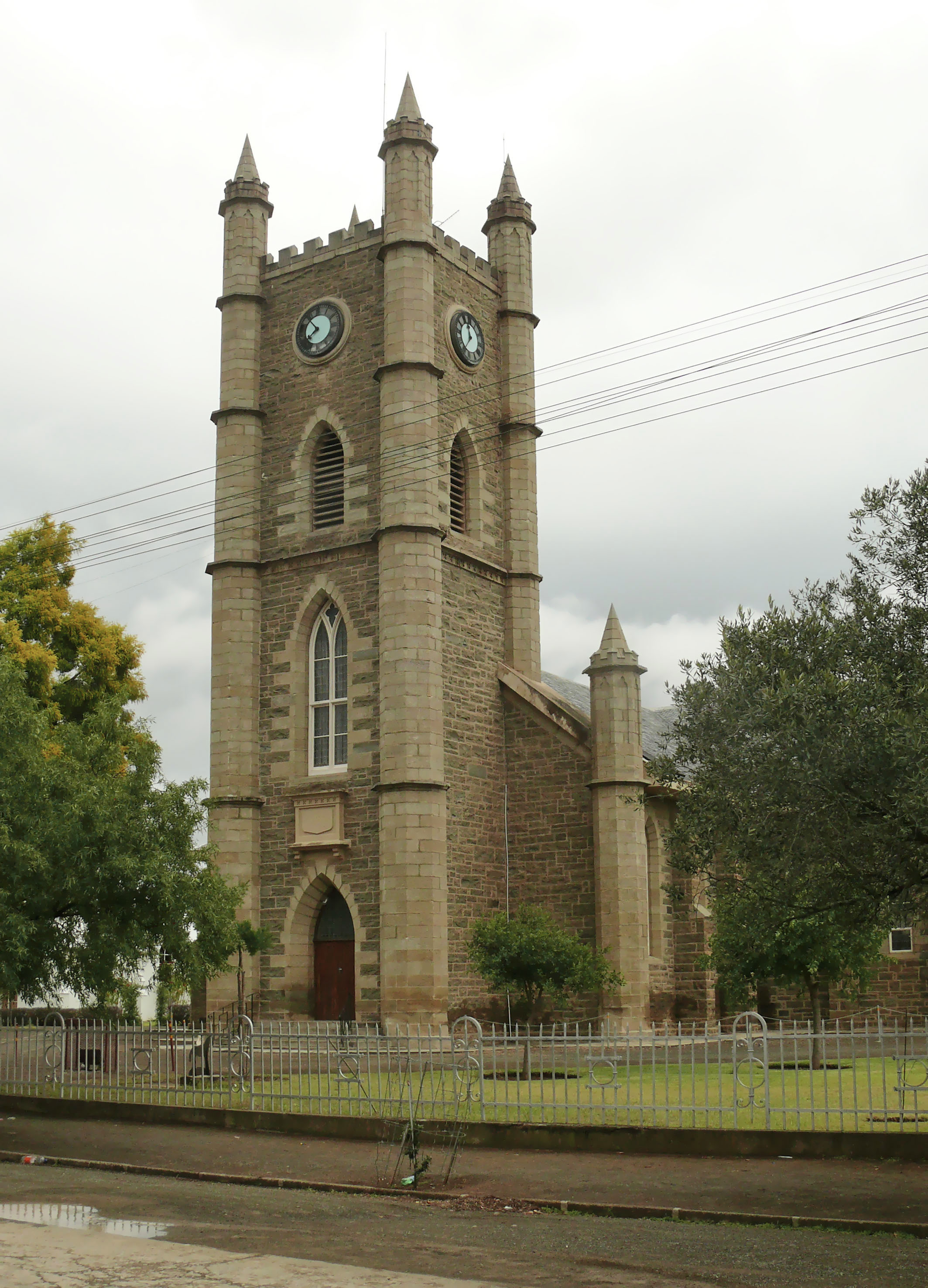
- Dutch Reformed Church in Adelaide

- Location within Eastern Cape Location within South Africa Location within Africa
- Coordinates: 32°42′28″S 26°17′44″E
- Country: South Africa
- Province: Eastern Cape
- District: Amathole
- Municipality: Raymond Mhlaba

Area
  - Total: 40.0 km^{2} (15.4 sq mi)
- Elevation: 600 m (2,000 ft)

Population (2011)
  - Total: 12,191
  - Density: 305/km^{2} (789/sq mi)

Racial makeup (2011)
  - Black African: 76.5%
  - Coloured: 18.8%
  - Indian/Asian: 0.5%
  - White: 3.5%
  - Other: 0.8%

First languages (2011)
  - Xhosa: 72.3%
  - Afrikaans: 22.6%
  - English: 3.0%
  - Other: 2.1%
- Time zone: UTC+2 (SAST)
- Postal code (street): 5760
- PO box: 5760
- Area code: 046

Adelaide is a town in the province of Eastern Cape, South Africa. Adelaide is situated at the foothills of the Great Winterberg mountain range, 22 kilometres (14 mi) east of Bedford and 37 kilometres (23 mi) west of Fort Beaufort on the R63 road.

== History ==
=== Before European arrival ===
The first recorded settlement of the modern day area of Adelaide was during the late 18th and 19th centuries, when white farmers (known as trekboers) settled here and started productive farming. Before that time there may have been some dispersed groups of Bushmen, however they left no written records.

=== Colonial Adelaide ===
Adelaide's origins date back to 1835 when a British officer named Captain Alexander Boswell Armstrong (1787–1862) established a military encampment which he named Fort Adelaide after Queen Adelaide. Despite the earlier English settlers, who were part of the 1820 Settlers, later on a large number of both Scottish and Afrikaans people soon immigrated here too. The Scottish were also the first to erect a church in the local area.

== Modern day Adelaide ==
Adelaide is an important centre for wool and sheep farming. Beef, mutton, venison, and citrus fruit are also important products. The specialised abattoir for venison (farm-hunted game meat) operating in the central town provides much needed employment to the local residents.

About 2,300 Coloureds reside in the Bezuidenhoutville township 3 kilometres (1.9 mi) from the central town, and represent 19% of Adelaide's inhabitants. Lingelethu is the largest Black African township in Adelaide, with a census exceeding 6,000 and a population share of 77% of the municipal area.

== Notable people ==
- Philip van der Walt, rugby union footballer
- RW Kember, rugby union footballer
- Ali Mgijima, rugby union player
- John Gomomo, unionist and activist
- Michael Court, cricketer
- Russell Bennett, rugby union player
- Errol Moorcroft, politician, farmer and author
- Chris Muller, commander
- Albert Troskie, composer and music historian
