= South African Society for Research in Music =

South African scholarly music organization

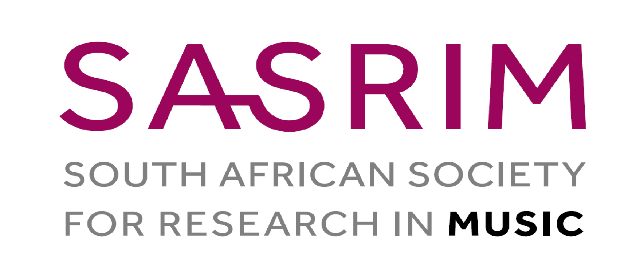

The South African Society for Research in Music (SASRIM) is a scholarly organization in Southern Africa fostering music research, including musicology, ethnomusicology, music theory, and music education.

SASRIM publishes the journal South African Music Studies (SAMUS), previously known as the South African Journal of Musicology, is an outlet for scholarly articles on African and South African music. Christine Lucia took over as editor in 2005. SASRIM hosts yearly conferences, where researchers and students meet to discuss their research. The 2024 conference was held at the University of Witwatersrand, co-hosted by the Black Opera Research Network (BORN), and had opera as its special interest topic.

== Objective ==
SASRIM supports and disseminates research across all musical traditions in Southern Africa. It prioritizes research engaging with South Africa's cultural and historical context, especially apartheid. It encourages disadvantaged South African researchers who are underrepresented in academia to participate.

== Merge ==
Prior to SASRIM, the Musicological Society of Southern Africa and the Ethnomusicology Symposium operated as separate entities, each catering to different branches of music scholarship. In the past, this divide manifested in both disciplinary and ideological tensions between the two forums. The push for music research culminated in a joint congress held at the University of Cape Town in 2005. Delegates voted for the formation of a single, inclusive society for music research. SASRIM was established in 2005 through the merger of the Musicological Society of Southern Africa and the Ethnomusicology Symposium.

== Leadership ==
An executive committee whom membership elects governs SASRIM. Leadership includes a president, vice-president, secretary, treasurer, and representatives of academic subfields. Musicologist Christine Lucia served as the founding editor of South African Music Studies under SASRIM's banner.

== South African Musicological Society ==
The idea of a musicological society had been discussed at Committee of Heads of University Music Departments (CHUM) meetings since the mid-1970s. However, initial attempts to finalize a constitution for the society were delayed several times due to disagreements and amendments proposed by CHUM members. In 1979, a group of individuals led by Marianne Becker, Bernard van der Linde, Albert Troskie, and others, drafted a constitution. This culminated in a meeting attended by 35 people, where the constitution was ratified. Following the efforts of CHUM to create a governing body for musicological activities, the South African Musicological Society was established on October 20, 1979. Its first executive committee included Douglas Reid as President, George King as Treasurer, Marianne Becker as Secretary, and Mary Rorich as an additional member.

In its early years, the Society held regular meetings and organized smaller scholarly events, such as lecture-recitals and academic talks. By the end of 1980, membership reached 80 members. One of the Society’s major achievements was the founding of SAMUS: South African Music Studies in 1980.

In 1989, the Society adopted a new constitution and was renamed the Musicological Society of Southern Africa.

== Ethnomusicology Symposium ==
The Symposium on Ethnomusicology was first held in 1980 at Rhodes University by Andrew Tracey, with support from Rupert Mayr of the Rhodes University Music Department (featuring Andrew Tracey and Johnny Clegg as speakers). The symposium's proceedings were published by the International Library of African Music (ILAM). The Ethnomusicology Symposium focuses on the musical traditions of South Africans. There were thus both disciplinary and ideological tensions between the two forums.
