= Bedford Provincial Hospital (Eastern Cape) =

- Eastern Cape Department of Health

Geography
- Location: Bedford, Eastern Cape, South Africa
- Coordinates: 32°40′35″S 26°04′58″E

Organisation
- Care system: Public
- Type: Community

Services
- Emergency department: Yes
- Beds: 35

Links
- Website: Eastern Cape Department of Health website - Amathole District Hospitals
- Other links: List of hospitals in South Africa

Bedford Provincial Hospital is a Provincial government funded hospital in the Raymond Mhlaba Local Municipality area of Bedford, Eastern Cape in South Africa.

The hospital departments include Emergency department, Paediatric ward, Maternity ward, Out Patients Department, Surgical Services, Medical Services, Operating Theatre & CSSD Services, Pharmacy, Anti-Retroviral (ARV) treatment for HIV/AIDS, PMTC & VCT, Post Trauma Counseling Services, Physiotherapy, X-ray Services, Laundry Services, Kitchen Services and Mortuary.
