= Michael Court =

South African cricketer (born 1941)

Personal information
- Born: 3 February 1941 (age 85); Adelaide, South Africa
- Source: Cricinfo, 17 December 2020

Michael Court (born 3 February 1941) is a South African cricketer. He played in seven first-class matches for Eastern Province from 1964/65 to 1966/67.

== See also ==
- List of Eastern Province representative cricketers
