= Die Vaderland =

Afrikaans afternoon newspaper in Johannesburg from 1936 to 1988

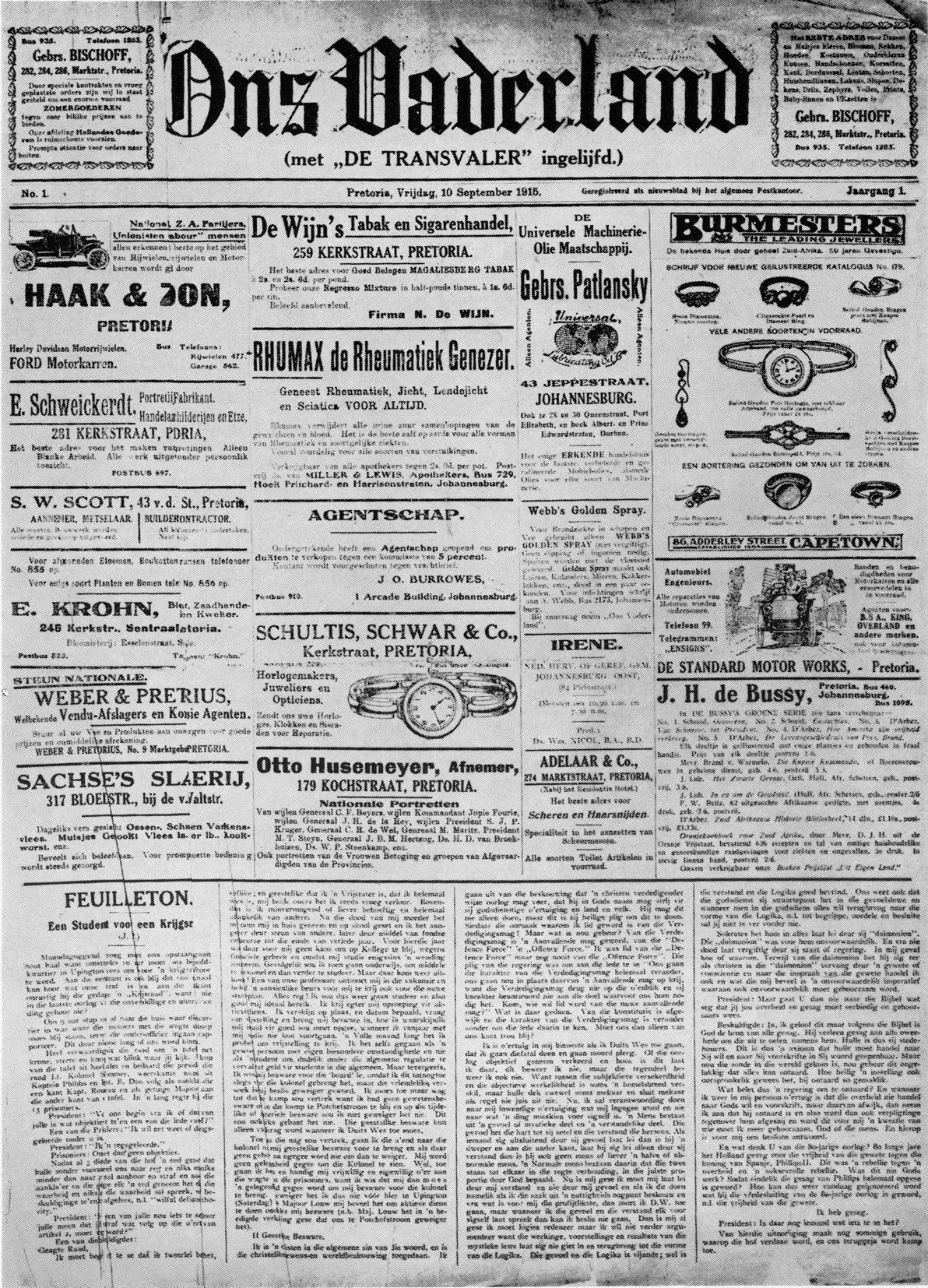
- Type: Afternoon newspaper
- Owner: Perskor
- Publisher: Perskor
- Founded: 1936
- Ceased publication: 1988
- Political alignment: Afrikaner nationalism
- Language: Afrikaans
- Headquarters: Johannesburg

Die Vaderland also known as Ons Vaderland was an Afrikaans afternoon newspaper in Johannesburg from 1936 to 1988.

It was the first Afrikaans daily in the city and during its entire existence a fervent supporter of the National Party, except from 1934 to 1939 when it supported the United Party because gen. J.B.M. Hertzog found himself in that party after the merger with the South African Party of gen. Jan Smuts. As a result, in 1937, Cape Nationalists set up Die Transvaler in Johannesburg as the mouthpiece of the Purified National Party. Until the appearance of Beeld in 1974, Die Transvaler was Johannesburg's only Afrikaans morning paper and Die Vaderland the only Afrikaans afternoon paper. The arrival of the National Pers' Image led in 1983 to the closure of Oggendblad and Hoofstad in Pretoria, in 1988 to the incorporation of Die Vaderland into Die Transvaler and finally, in 1993, also to the closure of Die Transvaler, Perskor's last Afrikaans daily, after which the company only published The Citizen and owned half of the Sunday newspaper Rapport.
