= Albert Troskie =

- Born: 7 October 1942 (age 83); Adelaide, South Africa
- Occupations: Organist, musicologist, arranger, composer
- Known for: Study and preservation of the pipe organ in South Africa and South African church music
- Notable work: Pyporrels in Suid-Afrika (1992), The Pipe Organ Heritage of South Africa (2010).

Albertus Jacobus Johannes Troskie (born 7 October 1942) is a South African organist, composer, and music historian, recognized for his significant contributions to church music in South Africa. He was the founding chairman of the Southern African Church and Concert Organists’ Society (SAKOV), an organization that has played a key role in church music across the region.

== Early life and education ==
Albert Troskie was born in Adelaide, the Union of South Africa and matriculated from Gill College. Louna Stofberg—whose MMus thesis discusses the life and work of Troskie—writes that upon the completion of his schooling, he read for the degree Bachelor of Music at the South African College of Music, University of Cape Town, where he studied under Cameron Taylor (piano) and Roelof Temmingh snr. (organ). He both graduated his bachelor's degree and was awarded a licentiate diploma in organ playing from the Royal Schools of Music in 1965.

== Career ==
Having worked at Vredelust Primary School in Bellville for a short while following his graduation, he was appointed a junior lecturer at the University of Port Elizabeth in 1967. Completing his Honours degree that year, he enrolled for a Master's shortly afterwards, graduating with the degree Master of Music in 1969 with a thesis entitled "The Musical Life of Port Elizabeth, 1875-1900". That same year, Troskie was awarded an overseas-study bursary by the University of South Africa which allowed him to study in Europe between 1969 and 1970. During this time, Troskie studied organ playing and improvisation with Cor Kee in the Netherlands, musicology and organ-building at the University of Amsterdam, and choral conducting under the German conductor Kurt Thomas.

Troskie was appointed lecturer at the University of South Africa in 1971, continuing to develop a career in church music and the study thereof. The degree Doctor of Music was conferred upon Troskie by the University of South Africa in 1975 on the merits of a thesis entitled "Die koorwerke van Max Reger (1873-1916)". Stofberg notes that this thesis was the culmination of research done in Bonn and Vienna while studying under Thomas. Troskie worked at the University of South Africa for eleven years, serving variously as lecturer (1971-1972), senior lecturer (1972-1976), and associate professor (1977-1982).

Returning to Gqeberha—formerly Port Elizabeth—in 1983, Troskie was made associate professor at the University of Port Elizabeth. Troskie was made the head of the University of Port Elizabeth music department in 1988, a position he held until 1999. Stofberg states that, from 1999 till his retirement in 2003, Troskie lectured both at the University of Port Elizabeth and the University of South Africa.

== Publications ==
Throughout his academic career, Troskie published articles in South African journals like Ars Nova and the South African Journal of Musicology, also publishing in the Journal of the British Institute of Organ Studies. Serving for eighteen years as the editor of Vir die Musiekleier/To the Director of Music, the official organ of the South African Church and Concert Organists' Society, Troskie published dozens of articles in that journal, frequently writing on new pipe organs around southern Africa and South African church music.

An important contributor to the study of the pipe organ in South Africa, Troskie's monograph Pyporrels in Suid Afrika (1992) is considered a key text in appraising the organ's history in South Africa. Likewise, his book The Pipe Organ Heritage of South Africa (2010) is an important text detailing historical organs in South Africa built between 1814 and 1914. While recognising the importance of Troskie's texts, Erik Dippenaar and Jonathan Hughes both note that the research relies heavily on secondary literature and is thus not always accurate. The texts are nonetheless valuable resources when investigating South Africa's pipe organ heritage.

== Church music ==
Albert Troskie is well known for his work as an arranger and composer of church music, designed for use in two of the three so-called "sister churches" of the Dutch Reformed Church in South Africa: the Nederduits Gereformeerde Kerk and the Nederduitsch Hervormde Kerk. As one of three final editors of the Liedboek van die Kerk (2001), and as a major contributor to that publication—providing reharmonisations for many hymns and metrical psalms—Troskie's influence on Dutch Reformed church music in South Africa is keenly felt. He is also a member of the commission for the Voortgesette Ontwikkeling van Nuwe Klassieke Kerkmusiek (VONKK) and has composed at least thirty tunes for the commission.

Troskie is also well known as an arranger and composer of introductions, reharmonisations, and service music for use in conjunction with the Liedboek van die Kerk. He has published three volumes of hymn arrangements for choir and organ, namely Liedboekverwerkings vir orrel en koor (2003), Liedboekverwerkings vir orrel en koor Vol. 2 (2006), and Hoor die blye tyding! Verwerkings vir Koor en Orrel Vol. 3 (2016). Troskie's work has also appeared in albums like the SAKOV Eerediensmusiek collections (three volumes—2010, 2011, and 2013—published by SAKOV) and Liturgiese Orrelmusiek (Volumes I-VI—1972, 1975, 1979, 1980, 1984, and 1989—published by the University of the Free State).

== Southern African Church and Concert Organists' Society ==
A pivotal figure in the founding and development of the Southern African Church and Concert Organists' Society (SAKOV) in 1980, Troskie has played a crucial role in promoting organ music and organists with Afrikaans churches in southern Africa. The society is aimed at supporting organists (mainly in the Dutch Reformed Church) around the country; Troskie has been very active in the society, serving as its chair for twenty years (1980-2000), editing its journal for eighteen (1980-1998), and consistently providing music for publication in its music collections.

== Organ consultant ==
Given his influence as a scholar of the pipe organ in South Africa, Troskie often designed specifications for new instruments, most notably serving as the consultant for the Feather Market Hall organ and the organ for the Dutch Reformed Church Summerstrand, both instruments in Gqeberha.

== Discography ==
As organist, Troskie has recorded two albums, listed below:

- Grand Organ (2000);
- Liedboekverwerkings vir orrel en koor (two CD set, 2006).

Erika Bothma (piano) and Troskie (organ), have recorded two albums together:

- Serenata (2020);
- Wonderful World (2022).

Troskie recorded the following with the Dutch Reformed Church Summerstrand Choir:

- Hosanna (2000);
- Halleluja! U is heilig (2004);
- Hoor die blye tyding! (2016).
