= Dutch Reformed Church, Glen Lynden =

Church in Bedford, South Africa

Dutch Reformed Church
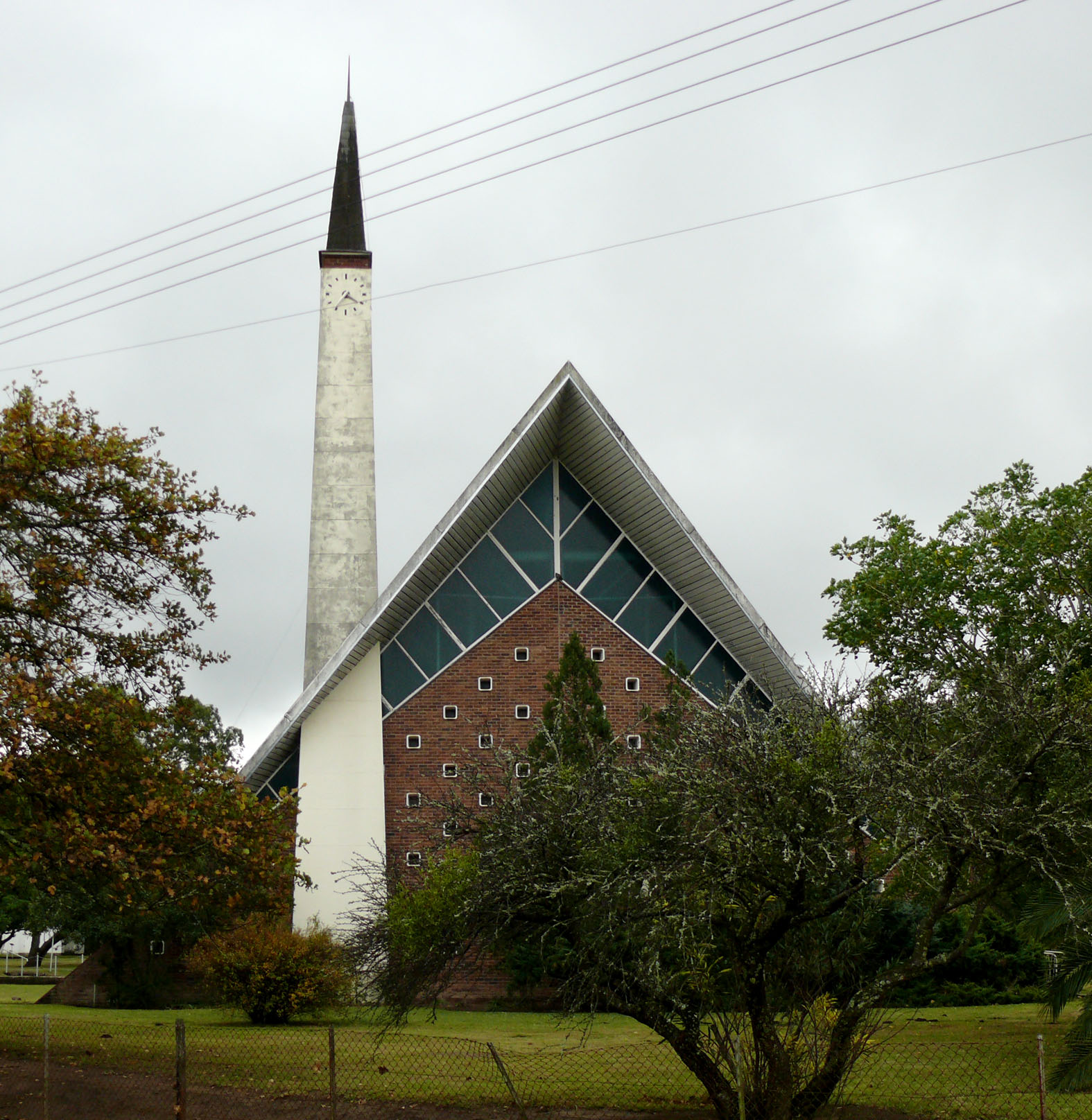
- Location: Bedford
- Country: South Africa
- Denomination: Nederduits Gereformeerde Kerk

History
- Founded: 1827

Architecture
- Functional status: Church

The Dutch Reformed Church in Glen Lynden (Bedford) is the 19th oldest congregation of the Dutch Reformed Church and the sixth oldest in the current Synod of the Eastern Cape. It was founded on 17 July 1829 in the Eastern Cape town of the same name, but the centre of gravity of the congregation shifted to the town of Bedford from 1891, with Glen Lynden today just a suburb. The congregation had 153 professing and 53 baptized members in 2009, compared to exactly 99 more of each in 1985.

== Background ==
Glen Lynden's history is said to be the most complicated of all the Dutch Reformed congregations. The same applies to its daughter congregation, Adelaide. In response to the government's offer of farms on the eastern border of the Cape Colony, Afrikaners and, in 1820, Scottish settlers settled along the Baviaans River. They called their temporary residence Glen Lynden.

Because both Afrikaans and English speakers strongly desired a congregation of their own, they petitioned the government in 1826 for a minister and church buildings. In response to the favourable response, a management committee was elected on 5 January 1827 – the founding date of the congregation – to appoint a minister and plan the buildings.

The church, which was transferred to the Dutch Reformed Church in Africa in 1964, was completed in 1828 and on 1 May 1829 the first minister, the Scottish Rev. John Pears, after whom Pearston was named, was welcomed. However, as early as 1830 he had exchanged the pulpit for a professorship in Cape Town. Discouraged by his scathing report on Glen Lynden, where he found it impossible to build up a congregation with farmers who were not interested in the church, the government did not send Rev. Alexander Welsh as his successor until 1833. He was also a minister from Scotland.

In 1855 Bedford was laid out as a town between Glen Lynden and Adelaide. And from then on there was a fierce rivalry between the three places for precedence as a church centre because Adelaide could not satisfy Bedford or Glen Lynden. However, Bedford had an unequal battle, because both Glen Lynden and Adelaide tried to prevent Bedford from being considered, because neither of them could exist as a congregation without Bedford.

Earlier, the deputy governor of the Eastern Province, Sir Andries Stockenström, had also tried to provide assistance. On the orders of Governor Sir Lowry Cole, he proclaimed the farm Glen Lynden as church parish property in March 1830. The difficulty with Glen Lynden was so serious that on 9 June 1830, Stockenström, as an authority in the Eastern Province, recommended that Glen Lynden be abandoned and the farm Koonapspos (later Adelaide) be taken as the centre for the parish. After the resignation of Rev. Pears, Stockenström lost all interest in the matter and left it there. When the parish of Glen Lynden learned of the vacancy and that the governor disapproved of their existence on Glen Lynden, Elder Robert Hart and other interested parties came up with a new proposal. They recommended that Stockenström should give a piece of his farm Maasstroom (later the town of Bedford) for a parish centre. He hesitated at first, but later agreed. This plan also failed. In a letter that Thomas Pringle immediately wrote to him about the matter, he rebuked him and Robert Hart for wanting to undermine Glen Lynden in order to increase the value of Maasstroom. An angry letter from Sir Andries, as only he could write it, was the answer. And with this the plan was also off the rails.

== Ministers ==
- John Pears, 1829 - 1830
- Alexander Welsh, 1833 - July 1856 (died in office)
- Georg Wilhelm Stegmann, 1859 - 1890 (emeritus; died on 14 October 1890)
- Daniel Jozua Pienaar, 1891 - 1896, 1898 - 1900
- Daniël Du Plessis Steyn, 1900 - 1906, 1908 - 1912
- M.L. de Villiers, 1912 - 1918
- Georg Wilhelm Stegmann Hofmeyr, 1920 - 1925
- Sydney Francis Feneysey, 1925 - 1933
- Ockert Almero Cloete, 1934 - 1941
- Johannes George Fourie van Rooyen, 1941 - 1946
- Gerhardus Igantius Moolman, 1947 - (?1952)
- Jacob Daniël Thom, 1953 - 1959
- Hendrik (Hennie) Belsazar Geyer, 1960 - 1966
- Luther Delport, 1966 - 1971
- Willem Johannes Jacobus Oosthuizen, 23 January 1971 - 31 March 1977
- Mornay du Plessis le Roux, 1978 - 1982
- Jerry Fourie, 1983 - 1989
- Alwyn Jacobus Burger, 1989 - 2003
- Lindsay Rudolf (Rudi) Swanepoel, 2004 - 2008
- Stefanus (Stefan) Thomas Malan, 2012 - present

== Sources ==
- Dreyer, eerw. A. 1935.Gedenkboek van die Nederduits-Gereformeerde Kerk Somerset Oos. Kaapstad: Cape Times Beperk.
- Armstrong, Elizabeth: Thomas Pringle - Brilliant Journalist of the South African Scene, 1820-1826. In: Lantern. Tydskrif vir Kennnis en Kultuur. Jaargang 9, nr. 2, Oktober 1959
- Feneysey, ds. S.F. 1930. Die Nederduits-Gereformeerde Gemeente Glen Lynden Gedurende 'n Honderd Jare 1829-1929. Kaapstad, Stellenbosch en Bloemfontein: Nasionale Pers, Beperk.
- Olivier, ds. P.L. (samesteller), Ons gemeentelike feesalbum. Kaapstad en Pretoria: N.G. Kerk-uitgewers, 1952.
- Symington, Johan (et al.), Jaarboek van die NG Kerke, Tydskriftemaatskappy, Kaapstad en Wellington, 1985, 2008.
- Lys van Oos-Kaapse gemeentes, 2010
