= Perskor =

Former South African media company

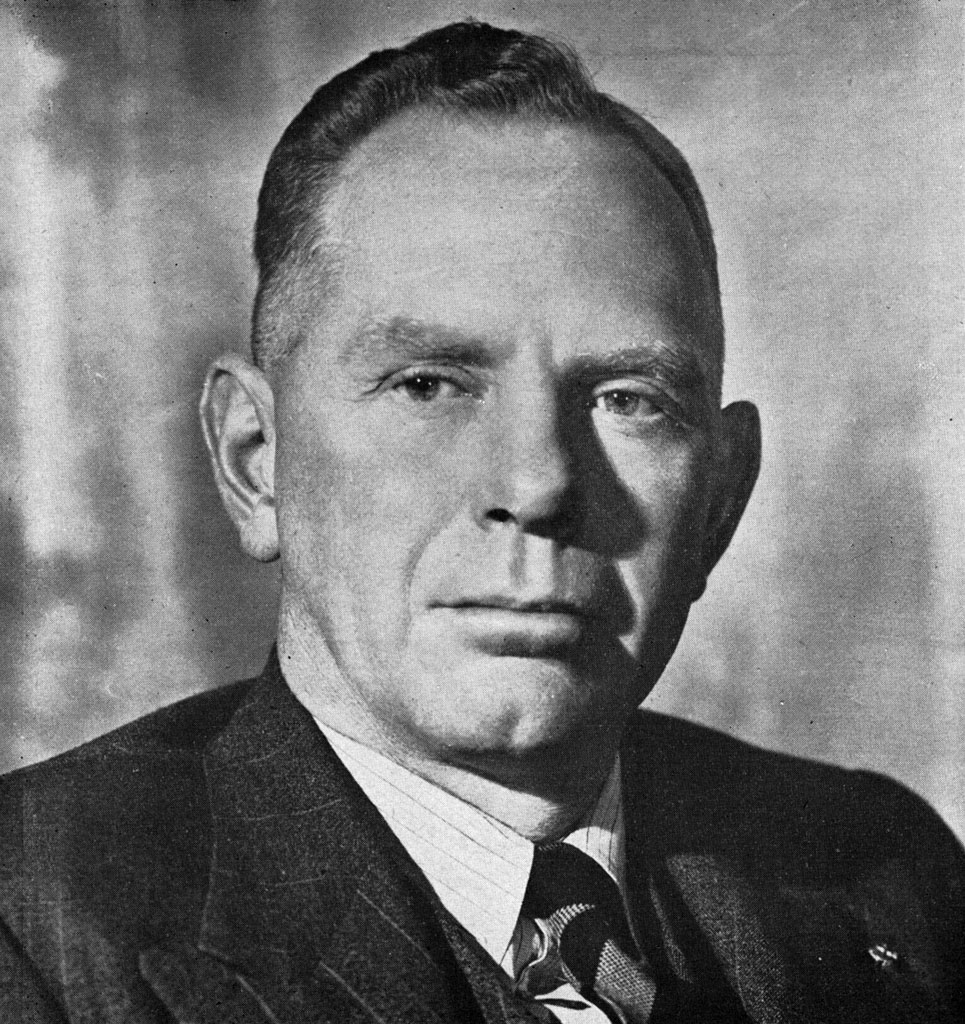
Min. Ben Schoeman, chairperson of the Dagbreektrust during the Press Struggle.

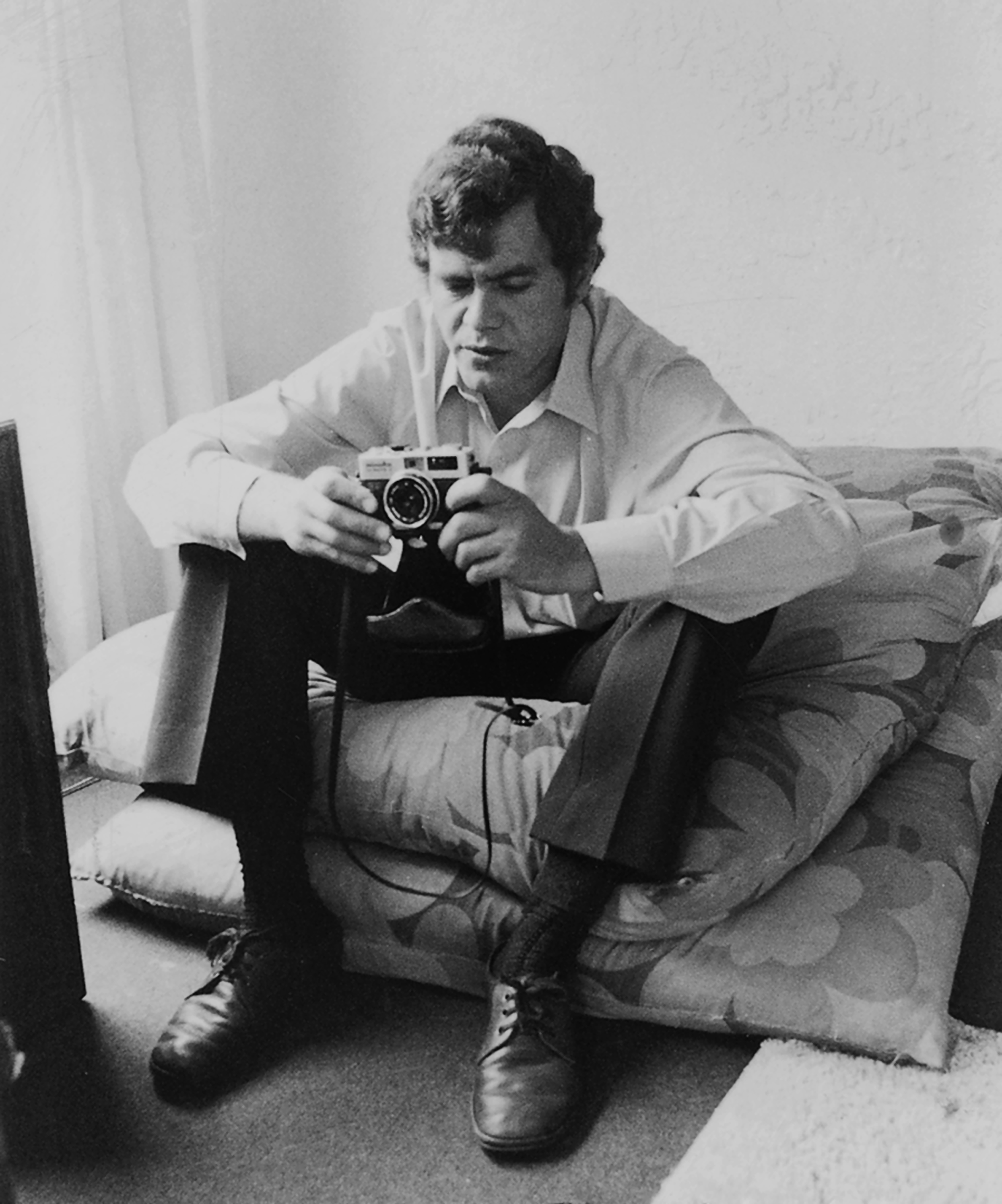
The Afrikaans lyricist Koos du Plessis began his journalistic career at Die Vaderland and worked later on at Oggendblad

Perskor (The Press Corporation of South Africa) was a South African press group. It was formed on 1 April 1971 when two existing Afrikaans publishing groups, Voortrekkerpers and the Afrikaans Pers (1962) Limited, merged. Both groups were based in the then Transvaal and competed with the Nasionale Pers of Cape Town. As a rule, but depending on the editor's disposition as far as the company's management allowed, they represented the northern, conservative views within the then National Party, as opposed to Naspers which represented the southern, enlightened views within the party. The history of the Afrikaans press has been a struggle for dominance and Boerebond led influence, that would eventually see the demise of Perskor.

== Newspapers merged ==
The competing Afrikaans Sunday newspapers, Die Beeld (owned by Naspers) and Dagbreek (owned by Perskor), merged as Rapport in 1970 to end the bitter press battle between the newspapers. The first edition of the united newspaper was published on 29 November 1970. The media groups each controlled half of the new newspaper, whose circulation at one stage was more than 500,000 and could hold its own against The Sunday Times.

Since the establishment in 1974 of Naspers' daily Beeld, which competes with Perskor's daily newspapers in Johannesburg and Pretoria, the original four dailies of Perskor have disappeared one after the other. The four were:

- Hoofstad, from 1968 to 1983 an afternoon paper in Pretoria with a circulation of about 20 000.
- Oggendblad, from 1971 to 1983 a morning paper in Pretoria with a circulation of about 10 000.
- Die Transvaler, initially a morning paper in Johannesburg founded in 1937 with a circulation of about 50 000. It was Perskor's last daily newspaper, published as an afternoon paper in Pretoria from February 1983 and which cost the company about R27 million in losses in its last year.
- Die Vaderland, an afternoon paper in Johannesburg founded in 1936 with a circulation of about 70 000 in 1974 before Beeld entered the northern market.

In 1960, Perskor acquired the Xhosa newspaper Imvo Zabantsundu, which had been founded in 1884. The newspaper ceased publication in 1998. The group also published the only English-language daily newspaper to support the then National Party during the apartheid era, The Citizen. It was founded in 1976 by Louis Luyt with secret government funding as a counterweight to what the National Party considered the "hostile" English-language press.

== Press struggle ==
On 16 September 1974, Naspers entered the Afrikaans newspaper market in the Transvaal with the first edition of Beeld. The editorial staff of the new entrant had hoped for sales of 100,000 per day, but by February 1975 this had fallen to 21,568, the lowest monthly figure in its existence. On 29 April 1975, 102,402 newspapers were sold thanks to news of the Fox Street siege,[1] but the average for the six months July to December 1975 (42,774) was still almost 20,000 less than its main competitor, Die Transvaler,'s 61,641.[2] Together, the two Afrikaans morning newspapers in Johannesburg achieved the once almost unthinkable by selling a combined circulation of 104,000, just 27,000 fewer than Johannesburg's English morning newspaper, the Rand Daily Mail.

The battle for readers between Beeld and Die Transvaler led Perskor's management to create fictitious figures for their three Johannesburg dailies, Die Vaderland, Die Transvaler and The Citizen. The manipulation began in 1976 when Beeld sold more than 50 000 newspapers over a six-month period for the first time. The peak of the fictitious figures was when Die Transvaler boasted on its front page on 1 August 1980 that it was then the largest Afrikaans daily in South Africa with a circulation figure for the six months from January to June that year of 75 287. Beeld's actual figure was then 64 901. Less than two months later, a Perskor official secretly came up with the fraud. The Audit Bureau of Circulation (ABC) investigated the matter and announced on 22 September 1980 that the latest six-month figure for Die Transvaler was 21,306 higher than the actual figure and Die Vaderland's was 9,367. The Citizen's was increased by 6,999. Further investigation revealed that the actual and fictitious sales figures differed even more:

- Die Transvaler: 49,525 (75,287), difference = 25,762;
- Die Vaderland: 48,594 (60,564), difference = 11,970;
- The Citizen: 45,000 (54,266), difference = 9,226.

The three newspapers' ABC membership was suspended and Beeld was able to immediately raise its advertising rate because it was then the largest Afrikaans newspaper in the Transvaal. P.J. Cillié, chairman of Naspers, requested an informal meeting with Ben Schoeman, chairman of Dagbreektrust, which controlled Perskor. This was held on 1 December 1980 in Pretoria. Cillié wanted compensation for Beeld's loss of advertising revenue, but Schoeman proposed a merger between the two press groups. Cillié was opposed to this, saying that the National Press was averse to such a monopoly.[1] Perskor did not want to give up on compensation. In January 1981, D.P. de Villiers of Naspers proposed a market division in the Transvaal with Naspers in the morning market and Perskor in the afternoon market because, according to him, the morning market had never paid anything for the latter, but the afternoon market had. Naspers later calculated that its loss due to the fictitious figures was R13.7 million. Because Perskor denied liability, Naspers decided to file a claim.

Marius Jooste opposed the idea of a market division until his death in October 1982, but was in favour of amalgamating the two press groups. In November 1982, the new chairman of Perskor, Willem van Heerden, and two members of the Dagbreektrust board held discussions with two senior Naspers officials. Cillié and De Villiers rejected a Perskor proposal for an umbrella company to take over the two morning papers in Johannesburg. Those present did not decide on a market division, but did decide that advisors on both sides should calculate the monetary value of Perskor's withdrawal from the morning market.

Ultimately, Perskor decided to have Die Transvaler withdrawn from the morning market if Naspers withdrew its claim for damages and paid R5 million for the evacuation of the morning market. Naspers was convinced that Beeld would eventually be able to completely overtake Die Transvaler, but the board feared "the eventual dismantling of Die Transvaler as a morning paper could (arouse) great bitterness among a significant part of the Transvaal reading public on which Beeld depended. This could also have adverse consequences in the political sphere",[1] as both newspapers were sympathetic to the National Party and relied on the party's supporters for readers.

== Market division ==
From the second week of February 1983, Die Transvaler moved as an afternoon paper to Pretoria, where Perskor's morning paper, Oggendblad (which sold only 5,828 copies on weekdays from July to December 1981), and its afternoon paper, Hoofstad (which sold 13,628 copies on weekdays in the same period, compared to the English-language Pretoria News' 24,876 copies on weekdays), were incorporated into Die Transvaler. This left Beeld as the only Afrikaans morning paper in Johannesburg, although it was also distributed in Pretoria and elsewhere in the Transvaal, and Die Vaderland as Johannesburg's Afrikaans afternoon paper. After Die Transvaler and Die Vaderland were readmitted to the ABC, their weekday sales figures for the period July to December 1981 were 44,109 and 40,998 respectively, compared to Beeld's 67,963.[1] The Rand Daily Mail fell to 106,759 during that period, 5,000 fewer than the then two Afrikaans morning newspapers, but Beeld would only be able to maintain a circulation of more than 100,000 on its own for a full year in 1988.

On 10 February 1983, Die Vaderland wrote that the market division was inevitable. "It was a rational and logical step and it was done in the broad interest of Transvaal Afrikaners." Just over five years later, further rationalization came when Die Vaderland ceased to exist in October 1988 after 52 years and was merged with Die Transvaler. This newspaper also disappeared five years later. Although Beeld was able to maintain a circulation of more than 100,000 for a long time, the newspaper could never come anywhere close to the combined circulation of the then five Afrikaans dailies in the Transvaal of more than 170,000.

== Magazines ==
Perskor was South Africa's largest magazine publisher long before Naspers became the market leader. Some of the magazines that Perskor controlled through the Republican Press, with its head office in Durban, included Farmers' Weekly, Personality, Scope, South African Garden and Home, Darling, Family Radio and TV, Rooi Rose, Your Family, Bona, Living and Loving, Radio and TV Dagboek and Keur.

== Caxton gains control ==
In 1995, Who Owns Who in the South African Print Media wrote that Perskor's owners are the Dagbreektrust, the tobacco and liquor giant Rembrandt and Nasionale Pers. "Publishes The Citizen (morning daily in Johannesburg); Transvaler (evening daily in Pretoria) and numerous weeklies and monthlies and magazines. Perskor is also involved in the publishing of books."

Fierce competition in a sluggish market deprived Perskor of its importance as a publisher of newspapers and books. Amid a fierce attack from Naspers' Beeld, Perskor's four Afrikaans dailies closed one after the other. Adversity in the stationery and textbook division led to a merger in 1996 with Kagiso Publishing. Two years later, Perskor ceded control of its regional newspapers to Caxton. Perskor was officially taken over by Caxton on 30 June 1998. In 1999, the new owner sold its 50% share in City Press and Rapport to Naspers.

== See also ==
- List of newspapers in South Africa

== Sources ==
- (af) Swart, dr. M.J. (voorsitter redaksiekomitee). 1980. Afrikaanse kultuuralmanak. Aucklandpark: Federasie van Afrikaanse Kultuurvereniginge.
- (en) Africa South of the Sahara 1983–84. Europa Publications Limited. London, 1983.
- (af) Ketupa.net
- (en) Freedom of Expression Institute
