= SAMUS: South African Music Studies =

- Discipline: Music studies
- Language: English
- Edited by: Matildie Wium and Jaco Meyer

Publication details
- Former name: South African Journal of Musicology
- History: 1981–current
- Publisher: South African Society for Research in Music (South Africa)
- Frequency: Annual

Standard abbreviations
- ISO 4: SAMUS

Indexing
- ISSN: 2223-635X
- LCCN: 2008257269
- OCLC no.: 863602032

Links
- Journal homepage

SAMUS: South African Music Studies is an annual peer-reviewed academic journal and the official journal of the South African Society for Research in Music (SASRIM). The journal is abstracted and indexed in RILM and The Music Index. Online access is provided by Sabinet Online, and African Journals OnLine. The journal is a successor of the South African Journal of Musicology which was published by the former Musicological Society of Southern Africa. SASRIM was established in 2006 as an amalgamation of the Musicological Society of Southern Africa and the Ethnomusicology Symposium. The journal covers research in musicology, ethnomusicology, music theory and analysis, popular music, composition, performance, music therapy, and music education. The journal is published once a year.

== Editors-in-Chief ==
- 1981-1982: Christoph Stroux
- 1983-1992: Robin Walton
- 1993-2003: Beverly Parker
- 2004-2008: Christine Lucia (guest editor: Stephanus Muller (2004))
- 2009: Jaco Kruger & Nishlynn Ramanna
- 2010-2011: Nishlynn Ramanna and Jeffrey Brukman
- 2012: Nishlynn Ramanna
- 2013: Jeffrey Brukman (guest editor: Ingrid Monson)
- 2015-2018: Willemien Froneman and Stephanus Muller
- 2019-2020: Stephanus Muller and Mia Pistorius
- 2021-2022: Lindelwa Dalamba, Jaco Meyer and Matildie Wium
- 2023-2024: Matildie Wium and Jaco Meyer

== Significant Editorial Initiatives ==
Over the years, several editors have implemented distinct strategies to transform the journal into a more inclusive and decolonial platform.

=== Christine Lucia (2004–2008) ===
Lucia introduced major changes to SAMUS during her tenure. In addition to appointing a new publisher and editorial board, she expanded the journal’s scope to move beyond its earlier focus on Western classical music. Lucia’s tenure also saw changes to the journal’s cover design, symbolizing SAMUS's new identity as an inclusive platform for Southern African music research.

Another significant development was Lucia’s introduction of expanded editorials that critically engaged with the journal's content. Unlike previous brief, descriptive editorials, Lucia focused on how "theory" was used in the articles and provided deeper contextualization of the links between the published work and the broader discipline of music studies, establishing a more reflective and critical editorial voice.

=== Willemien Froneman & Stephanus Muller (2015–2018) ===
During their tenure as editors, Willemien Froneman and Stephanus Muller implemented significant transformations. Faced with delayed publication schedules and low submission rates, they not only sought to update the journal but also to redesign its structure and focus, aligning it with the decolonial ideals highlighted by the 2015–2016 #FeesMustFall movement.

One of their key innovations was the introduction of "nodes", which organized content thematically rather than formally. This approach allowed the journal to include a broader range of material, from traditional academic articles to visual art and fiction, and sought to break down distinctions between peer-reviewed and non-peer-reviewed content. Froneman and Muller’s vision encouraged deeper engagement with complex topics by enabling contributors to explore connections across various disciplines.

A notable aspect of their editorship was the integration of visual art by artists like Willem Boshoff, Manfred Zylla, and William Kentridge, which enriched the journal’s aesthetic and highlighted the interdisciplinary connections between music and other art forms.

In response to the #FeesMustFall movement’s calls for decolonisation, Froneman and Muller aimed to make SAMUS a platform for addressing social justice and transformation, viewing this as a decolonial imperative. Their editorials critically reflected on the state of music studies, touching on themes like disciplinary crises, scholarship ethics, and the influence of student activism. Their efforts to democratize the journal and amplify local voices significantly enhanced SAMUS’s role in transforming South African music studies.

=== Stephanus Muller & Mia Pistorius (2019–2020) ===
Many of the strategies implemented by Froneman and Muller were retained and refined. This included the node-based format and the journal’s commitment to engaging with decoloniality.

== Abstracting and indexing ==
The journal is abstracted and indexed in:

- RILM Abstracts of Music Literature
- Music Index
- Academic Search Premier
