= Imvo Zabantsundu =

First black periodical in South Africa

Imvo Zabantsundu (views of the black people) was the first independent black newspaper in South Africa.

It was published by Thanda Press in King William's Town and served as a newspaper for black readers. The newspaper, which was first published in 1884, was first edited by John Tengo Jabavu. Articles were published in English and Xhosa. The newspaper was banned from 27 August 1901 to 8 October 1902 during the Second War of Independence. It later came into the possession of Perskor, but publication ceased in 1998, when Perskor and Caxton were merged.
