= Bedford, South Africa =

Bedford Nyarha
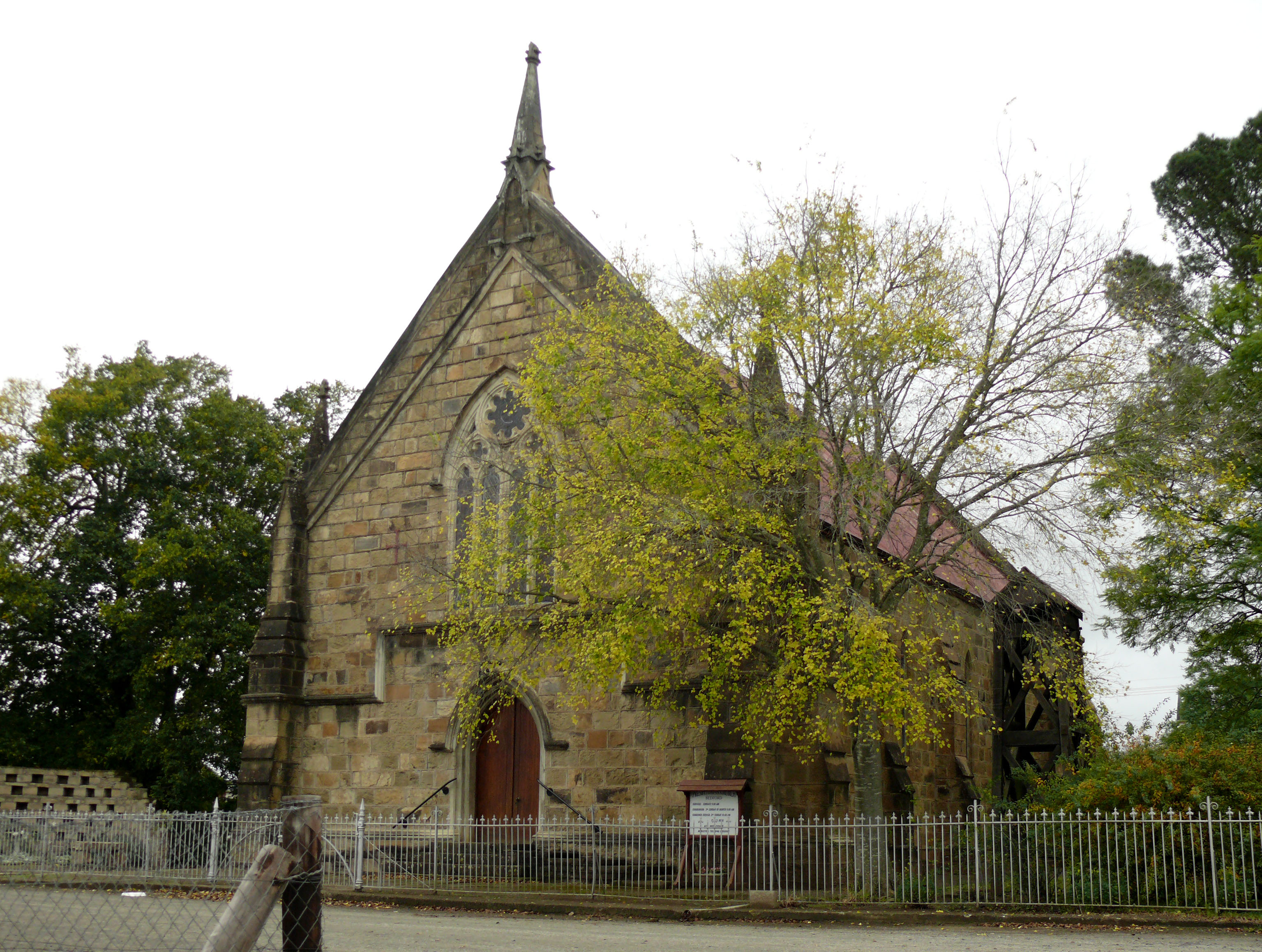
- Presbyterian Church in Bedford

- Location within Eastern Cape Location within South Africa
- Coordinates: 32°41′S 26°05′E
- Country: South Africa
- Province: Eastern Cape
- District: Amathole
- Municipality: Raymond Mhlaba
- Established: 1854

Area
  - Total: 14.6 km^{2} (5.6 sq mi)
- Elevation: 740 m (2,430 ft)

Population (2011)
  - Total: 8,770
  - Density: 601/km^{2} (1,560/sq mi)

Racial makeup (2011)
  - Black African: 68.9%
  - Coloured: 27.1%
  - Indian/Asian: 0.1%
  - White: 3.2%
  - Other: 0.7%

First languages (2011)
  - Xhosa: 63.5%
  - Afrikaans: 29.7%
  - English: 4.5%
  - Other: 2.2%
- Time zone: UTC+2 (SAST)
- Postal code (street): 5780
- PO box: 5780
- Area code: 046

Bedford or Nyarha is a town in the centre of the Eastern Cape province of South Africa. It was established in the mid-19th century when Sir Andries Stockenstroom sold portions of land from his farm Maastroom to raise funds for the restoration of his library, which had been burnt by British soldiers mistrustful of his attempts to broker peace in one of the Cape Frontier Wars. The farm is still there and open for visitors.

It is located on the southern edge of the Winterberg mountain range, in the Smaldeel (a narrow strip of grassland running laterally from Fort Beaufort to Somerset East, renowned for its sweet grass). The town suffered a major decline in fortunes in the latter half of the 20th century before reviving itself around the turn of the millennium. It is regarded today as an artist's haven and retirement village.

Bedford has the following locations or human settlements; Town, New Brighton, Coloured Valley, Nonzwakazi, Bhongweni, Ndlovini, Khayelitsha, Polar Park, New Rest and Goodwin Park

The lack of industry in the town, while a boon to those hoping to escape the rat race, means that the town has a large unemployment rate. The woes of the poor are exacerbated by a high HIV-AIDS infection rate.

Bedford is home to two high schools namely; Templeton High School, situated in the suburban part of the town and Lonwabo Senior Secondary School, situated in Circular Drive in the Polar Park Location. Other than that there is a Model C school, Bedford Country School situated just behind the Public Library in town . Nonyameko Junior Primary School is situated in the Nonzwakazi Location just as is Ntlama Higher Primary School. Bedford Primary School is situated in the Coloured Location of Bedford.

The Bedford Provincial Hospital is situated in Maitland Street, three blocks northwest of the town's centre. Other healthcare centres include the Town Clinic in the suburban part of the town and Mzamohle Clinic in the location part of the town.

Most tourists visit Bedford to experience true South African farm living. It is also known for the garden festival where people who live in the town and surrounding farms get to show case their gardens and other creative art work.

== History ==
The town goes back to 1854 when it was founded and named for the Duke of Bedford in England.Sir Andries Stockenstrom had to sell portions of his land to raise funds for restoration of his library burnt by the British soldiers mistrustful of his attempt to broker peace in the Cape Frontier Wars.The farm is still there and open to visitors. In 1820 a group of English and Scottish settlers arrived in what is now Bedford with the prospects of looking for wealth and prosperity.

== Points of interest ==
- Bedford Club, 1920
- Bedford Drapers, 1899
- Dutch Reformed Church, 1827
- Presbyterian Church, 1863
- St Andrews Anglican Church, 1878
- Pharmacy, 1903
- War Memorial, 1920

== Notable people ==
- Jessie Rose Innes, nurse and suffragist
- Athol Trollip, politician and Member of Parliament
- Paul Xiniwe, singer, educator, entrepreneur, and political activist
