= Die Transvaler =

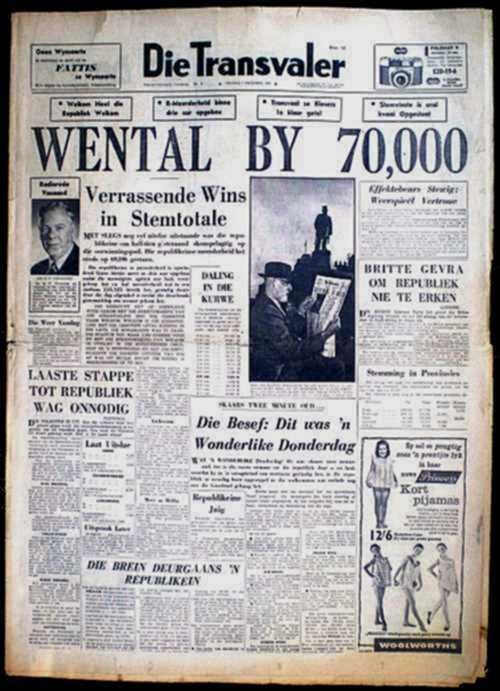
- Type: Daily newspaper
- Owner: Voortrekkerpers
- Publisher: Voortrekkerpers
- Editor: Hendrik Verwoerd
- Founded: 1937
- Ceased publication: 1987
- Political alignment: Afrikaner nationalism
- Language: Afrikaans
- Headquarters: Johannesburg

Die Transvaler (lit. 'The Transvaalian') was a South African newspaper founded in 1937 with the aim of promoting Afrikaner nationalism and supporting the Transvaal branch of the National Party. Hendrik Verwoerd was its first editor.

== History ==
On 1 October 1937, Nasionale Pers set up the company Voortrekkerpers in the Transvaal to support the National Party in Transvaal by publishing Die Transvaler. Initially the Cape National Party tried to control the extremism of the National Party in the Transvaal by appointing Hendrik Verwoerd as the papers first editor but he would side with Transvaal branch and Nationale Pers gave up editorial control in 1939.

=== Editors ===
- H.F. Verwoerd (1937-1948)
- J.J. Kruger (1948-1960)
- G.D. Sholtz (1960-1968)
- C.F. Nöffke (1969-1973)
- Willem Johannes de Klerk (1973-1987)

During World War II, Die Transvaler had triumphantly headlined every Nazi victory and constantly attacked "British Jewish liberalism." In 1943, Verwoerd sued the English-language newspaper The Star for libel after it accused him of being a Nazi propagandist. In his judgment dismissing the case, Justice Mallin stated that Verwoerd "did support Nazi propaganda; he did make his newspaper a tool of the Nazis in South Africa, and he knew it."
