= Presidency of Nelson Mandela =

South African presidential administration from 1994 to 1999

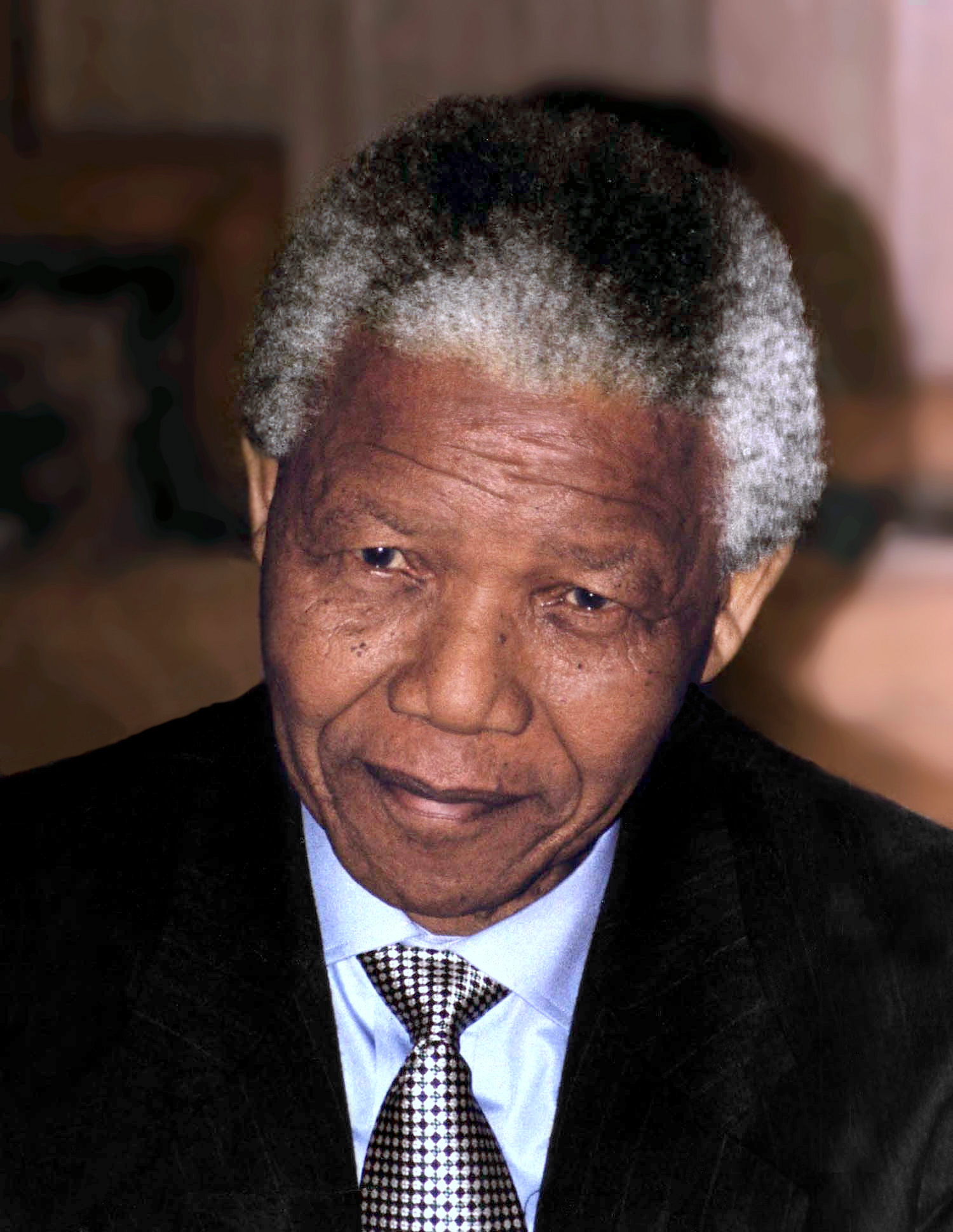
- Mandela in 1994
- Presidency of Nelson Mandela; 10 May 1994 – 14 June 1999
- President: Nelson Mandela
- Cabinet: Cabinet of Nelson Mandela
- Party: African National Congress
- Election: 1994
- Seat: Mahlamba Ndlopfu, Pretoria; Genadendal Residence, Cape Town
- Coat of arms of South Africa (1932–2000)

The presidency of Nelson Mandela began on 10 May 1994, when Nelson Mandela, an anti-apartheid activist, leader of uMkhonto we Sizwe, lawyer, and former political prisoner, was inaugurated as President of South Africa, and ended on 14 June 1999. He was the first non-White head of state in the history of South Africa, taking office at the age of 75. His age was taken into consideration as part of his decision to not seek re-election in 1999.

== Election ==
The 1994 general election, held on 27 April, was South Africa's first multi-racial election with full enfranchisement. The African National Congress won a 63 percent share of the vote at the election, and Mandela, as leader of the ANC, was inaugurated on 10 May 1994 as the country's first Black President, with the National Party's F. W. de Klerk as his first deputy and Thabo Mbeki as the second in the Government of National Unity.

== 1995 ==
State Arrival and dinner for President Nelson Mandela and President Bill Clinton in 1994

When Mandela began his term on 10 May 1994, he presided over the transition from minority rule and apartheid, winning international respect for his advocacy of national and international reconciliation.

Mandela encouraged the Black South Africans to get behind the previously hated Springboks (the South African national rugby team) as South Africa hosted the 1995 Rugby World Cup. (This is the theme of the 2009 film Invictus.) After the Springboks won an epic final over New Zealand, Mandela presented the trophy to captain Francois Pienaar, an Afrikaner, wearing a Springbok shirt with Pienaar's own number 6 on the back. This was widely seen as a major step in the reconciliation of White and Black South Africans.

== 1996 ==
In 1996, Mandela divorced his estranged wife, Winnie Madikizela-Mandela. Thabo Mbeki became the sole deputy president of South Africa in June as a result of F. W. de Klerk's resignation from joint office. In July that year, Mandela confirmed that he would not be seeking re-election to the presidency in 1999.

== 1997 ==
=== Lockerbie trial ===
President Mandela took a particular interest in helping to resolve the long-running dispute between Gaddafi's Libya, on one hand, and the United States and UK on the other, over bringing to trial the two Libyans who were indicted in November 1991, and accused of bombing Pan Am Flight 103, which subsequently broke apart and fell to and near Lockerbie, Scotland, UK on 21 December 1988, with the loss of 270 lives. As early as 1992, Mandela informally approached US President George H. W. Bush with a proposal to have the two indicted Libyans tried in a third country. Bush reacted favourably to the proposal, as did President François Mitterrand of France and King Juan Carlos I of Spain. In November 1994 – six months after his election as president – Mandela formally proposed that South Africa should be the venue for the Pan Am Flight 103 bombing trial.

However, UK Prime Minister John Major flatly rejected the idea, saying that the UK government did not have confidence in foreign courts. A further three years elapsed until Mandela's offer was repeated to Major's successor, Tony Blair, when Mandela visited London in July 1997. Later during the same year, at the 1997 Commonwealth Heads of Government Meeting (CHOGM) at Edinburgh in October 1997, Mandela warned:

"No one nation should be complainant, prosecutor and judge."

== 1998 ==
In South Africa's first post-apartheid military operation, acting president Mangosuthu Gatsha Buthelezi (who was South Africa's third in command after Nelson Mandela and Thabo Mbeki) ordered troops into Lesotho in September 1998 to protect the government of Prime Minister Pakalitha Mosisili. This came after a disputed election prompted fierce opposition threatening the unstable government.

On his 80th birthday in 1998, Mandela married Graça Machel, the widow of former Mozambican president Samora Machel. She remains the first and only woman in history to serve as First Lady of two countries.

== 1999 ==
A compromise solution was then agreed for a trial to be held at Camp Zeist in the Netherlands, governed by Scots law, and President Mandela began negotiations with Colonel Gaddafi for the handover of the two accused (Megrahi and Fhimah) in April 1999.

=== End of term ===
The 1996 constitution limited the president to two consecutive five-year terms. Mandela did not attempt to have the document amended to remove the two-term limit; indeed, he had only intended to serve one term, age being a strong factor in this decision. Mandela left office on 14 June 1999. He was succeeded by Mbeki, who was inaugurated to the presidency on 16 June. Mandela retired from active politics, and became, for several years afterward, engaged in several philanthropic activities.

== Legacy ==
=== AIDS/HIV policy ===
Commentators and critics including AIDS activists such as Edwin Cameron have criticised Mandela for his government's ineffectiveness in stemming the AIDS crisis. After his retirement, Mandela admitted that he may have failed his country by not paying more attention to the HIV/AIDS epidemic. After that Mandela spoke out on several occasions against the AIDS epidemic.

== See also ==
- Cabinet of Nelson Mandela
