= Abraham de Smidt =

South African surveyor and painter

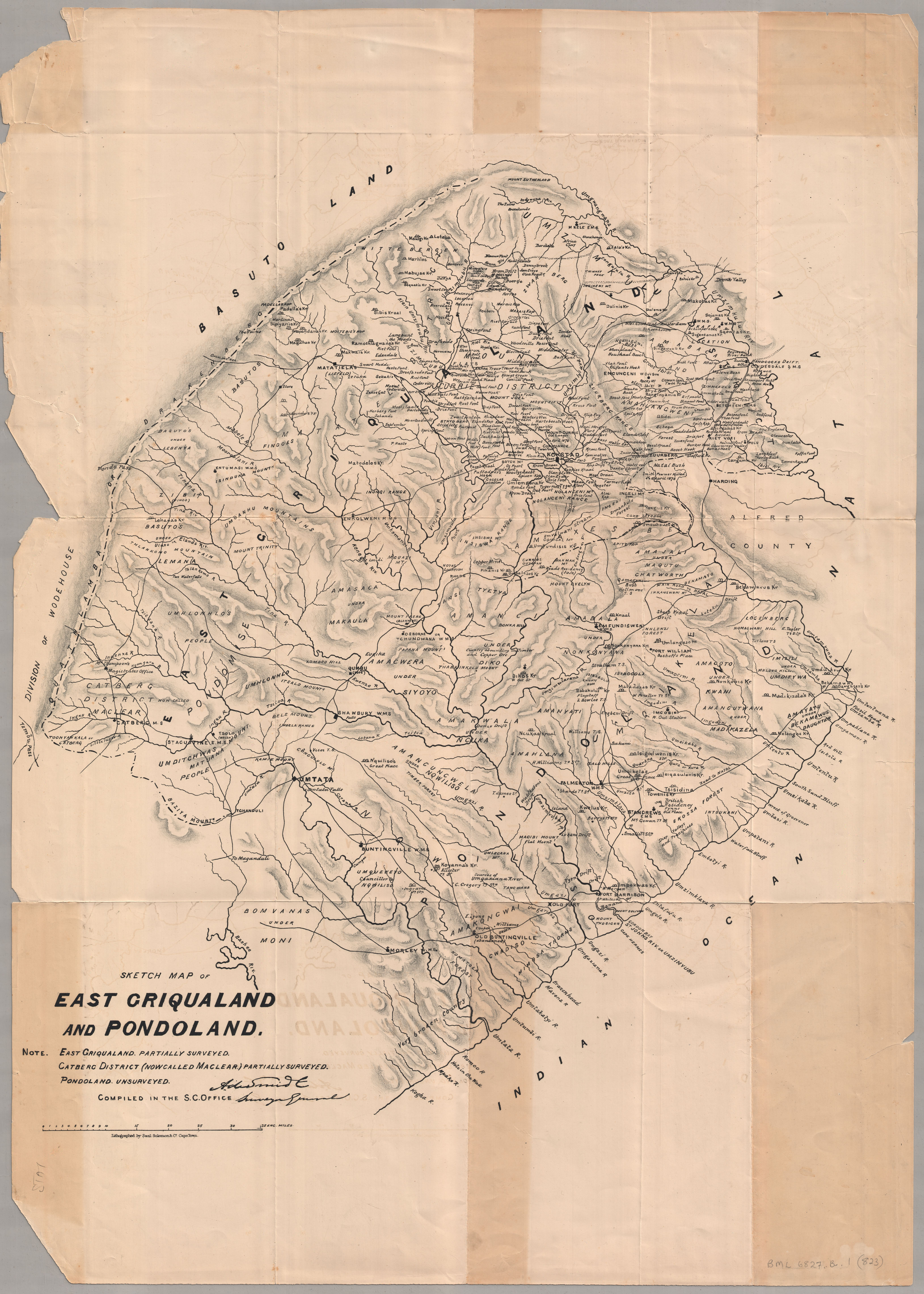
Sketch map of East Griqualand and Pondoland by Abraham de Smidt (1880)

Abraham de Smidt (30 May 1829—31 January 1908) was a South African surveyor and landscape painter. Between 1872 and 1889, he was the surveyor general of the Cape Colony.

Abraham de Smidt was born in Cape Town in 1829. He was a son of Willem Anne Janssens de Smidt and Susanna Margaretha Redelinghuys. His father was a clerk in the office of the surveyor general. De Smidt graduated from the South African College, in 1845, he never had a university education. Between 1846 and 1848, he was employed at the Commissariat office, and in 1848 de Smidt started in the office of office of the surveyor-general as the third clerk. In the same year, he was appointed a government surveyor. His professional activity originally took place in Eastern Cape and was related to Xhosa Wars. In 1855 de Smidt was promoted to full clerk, and in 1863 to assistant surveyor general. In 1870, he organized the surveying party at the summit of the Table Mountain, with the goal, in particular, to investigate possibly water sources which could be used in Cape Town. On 1 December 1872, de Smidt was appointed the surveyor general. At the time, reliable maps of the southern Africa were lacking, and de Smidt advocated for the government the need to perform topographical surveys. This resulted in a publication of a set of maps in 1879 which provided full coverage of the Orange Free State, Transvaal, Lesotho, and KwaZulu-Natal.

In the 1840s, de Smidt studied painting with Thomas William Bowler and started painting himself, first landscapes in water color. Since 1852, he regularly exhibited in Cape Town. De Smidt's early works show an influence of J. M. W. Turner and James Duffield Harding, and his style can generally be considered as romanticism. Between May 1857 and January 1858 he visited Europe, where he had a chance to study European art. Later, he was a trustee of the art collection by Thomas Butterworth Bailey which later became the South African National Gallery and is regarded as one of the founders of the gallery.

In June 1889 de Smidt retired, sold his property in South Africa and moved with his family to England. He kept painting until approximately 1900, when his eyesight became too poor. He died in 1908 in Brighton.

He married his cousin, Alida Cornelia Redelinghuys, and they had three sons and three daughters. His first wife died in 1873. De Smidt married then Hermina Gertruida Overbeek, with whom he had three sons and a daughter. He inherited Groote Schuur, an estate in Cape Town, from his uncle, also Abraham de Smidt. De Smidt lived there with his family and sold the property in 1879. In 1891, the estate was bought by Cecil Rhodes.
