= Bryntirion =

Bryntirion may refer to:

- Bryntirion, a locality within Bridgend, Wales
- Bryntirion (Brisbane), Australia, a heritage-listed house
- The Bryntirion Estate, Pretoria, South Africa
