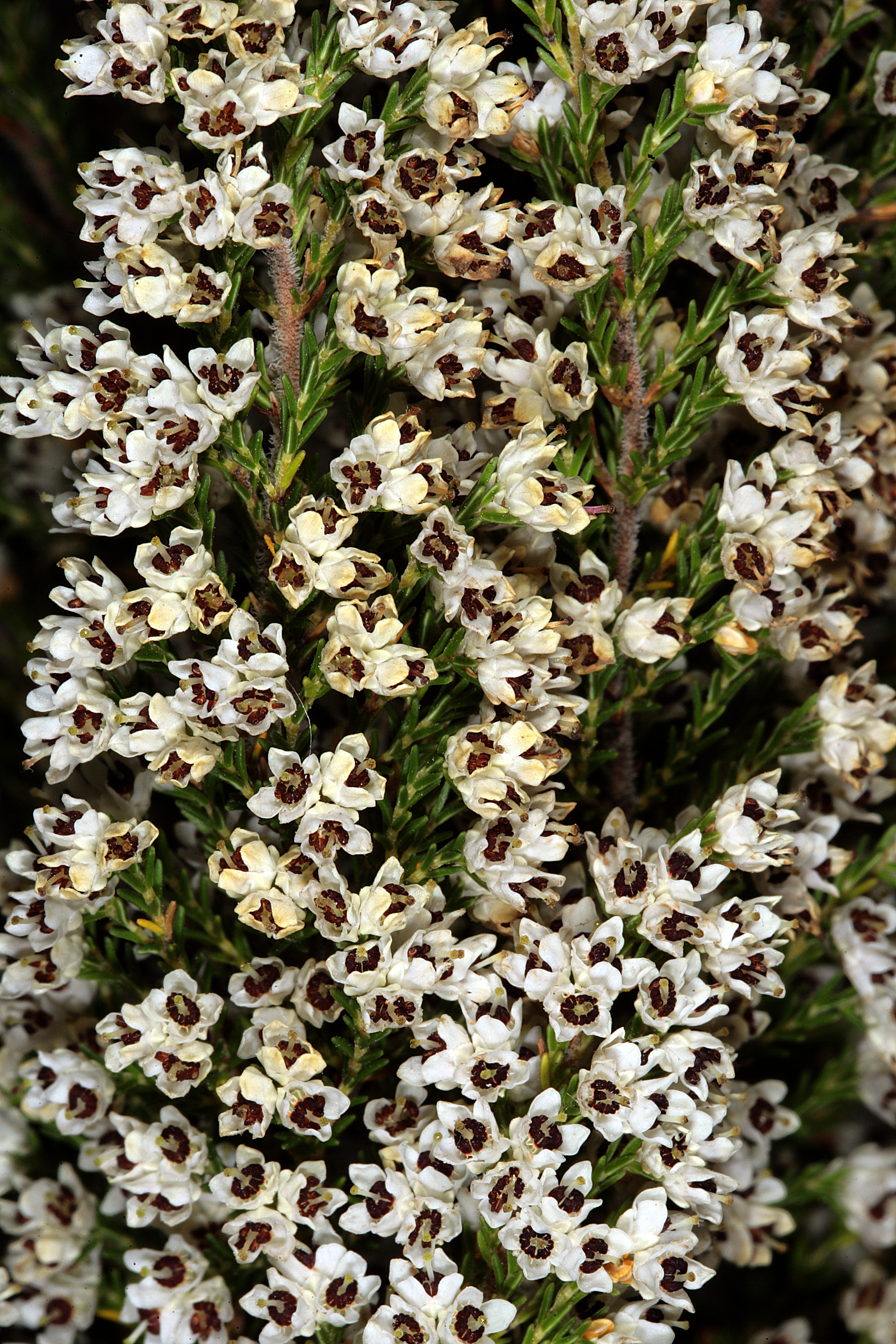

Scientific classification
- Kingdom: Plantae
- Clade: Tracheophytes
- Clade: Angiosperms
- Clade: Eudicots
- Clade: Asterids
- Order: Ericales
- Family: Ericaceae
- Genus: Erica
- Species: E. oakesiorum

Binomial name
- Erica oakesiorum E.G.H.Oliv., (1997)

= Erica oakesiorum =

Species of flowering plant

Erica oakesiorum is a plant belonging to the genus Erica and is part of the fynbos. The species is endemic to the Western Cape and occurs in the Riviersonderend Mountains from Genadendal to Pilaarkop. The range is 43 km² and there are six subpopulations. However, two may have been destroyed due to too many veld fires. Each subpopulation is small, approximately 250 plants; the total population is estimated to be less than 2 500 plants. Invasive plants such as pine trees and veld fires remain a threat to the plant.
