= Mahlamba Ndlopfu =

Official residence of the President of South Africa

- Former names: Libertas
- Alternative names: English: "The New Dawn"

General information
- Architectural style: Cape Dutch architecture
- Location: Bryntirion Estate, Pretoria, South Africa
- Coordinates: 25.7377612°S 28.2265393°E
- Current tenants: Cyril Ramaphosa, President of the Republic of South Africa
- Opened: 1940; 85 years ago

Design and construction
- Architect: Gerard Moerdijk

Website
- thepresidency.gov.za

Mahlamba Ndlopfu (formerly known as Libertas) is the chief official residence of the President of the Republic of South Africa. The head of government has made it their official home since 1940 and it is located in the Bryntirion Estate in Pretoria.

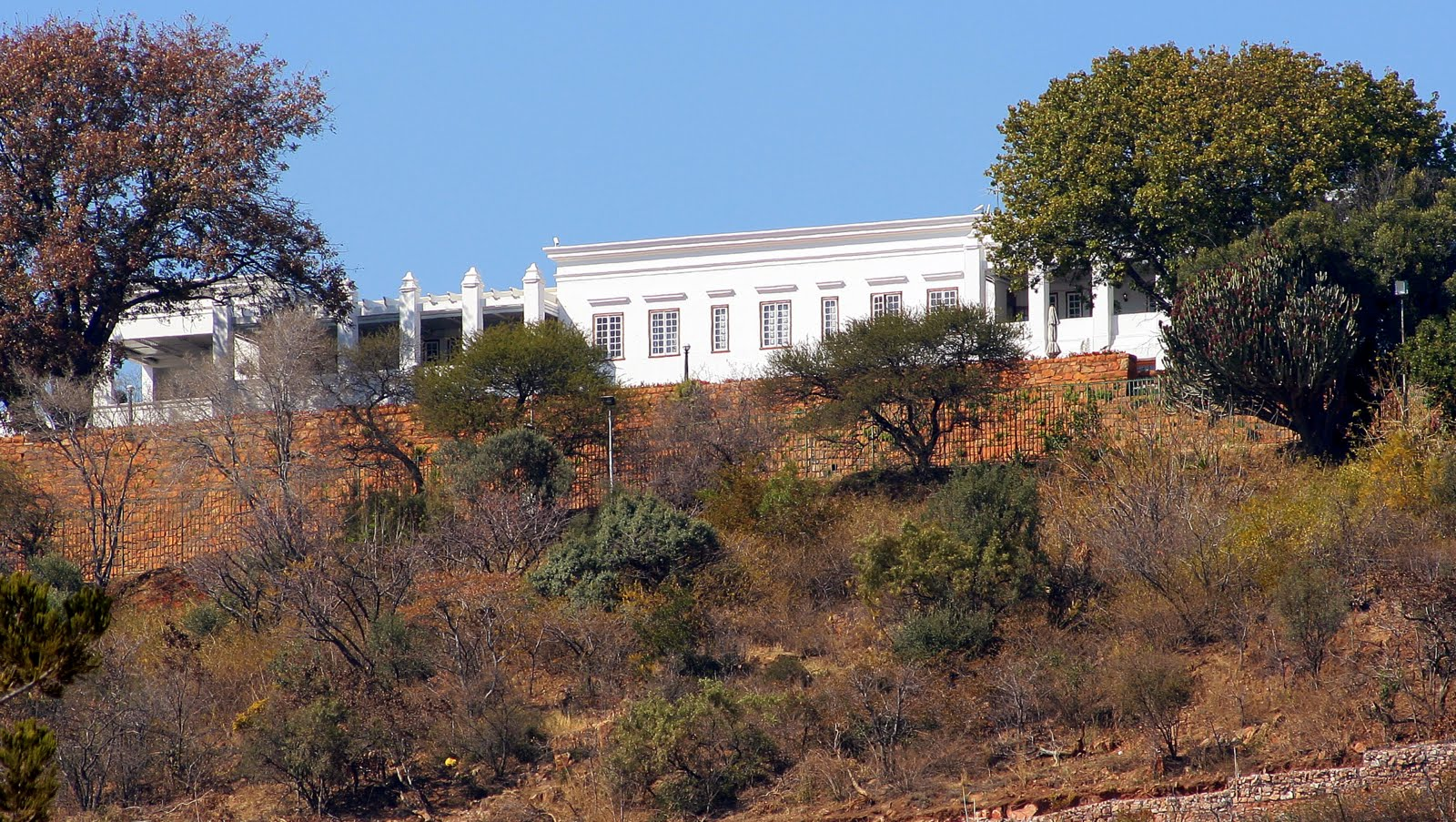

The building was built in 1940 and was designed by Gerard Moerdijk, a South African architect, to be the official residence in Pretoria of the Prime Minister of the time, General Jan Smuts. Since its creation, Mahlamba Ndlopfu has also hosted official visits from foreign heads of state, such as visits by François Mitterrand, the President of the French Republic, and Barack Obama, the President of the United States.

The current occupant of Mahlamba Ndlopfu is Cyril Ramaphosa, President of the Republic of South Africa since February 14, 2018.

== History ==
=== Origin and construction ===
In the late 1930s, Prime Minister Jan Smuts and his government organised a national competition to select the architect who would lead the construction of the new official residence in Pretoria of the South African head of government. Gerard Moerdijk, already known for designing the University of Pretoria and the Voortrekker Monument, convinced the jury appointed by the Department of Public Works.

Moerdijk decided to adopt the Cape Dutch style, a type of traditional house common among Boer and Afrikaans descendants in South Africa. However, he adapted this style to a more luxurious context so that the place could express the charm and power of the Union of South Africa. Jan Smuts was the first head of government to settle in this residence which was then called Libertas (freedom in Latin).

=== Historical evolution ===
From 1940 to 1961, Libertas was the chief official residence of the Prime Ministers of the Union of South Africa, which was a dominion under the Crown. The Prime Minister's other official residence was Groote Schuur, which is located in Cape Town. The Prime Minister was the head of government, while the Governor-General, who defended the interests of London, represented the British monarch, the monarch being the Sovereign and Head of State.

On 31 May 1961, the Union officially became the Republic of South Africa, following a referendum organised by Prime Minister Hendrik Verwoerd the previous year. The country was forced to leave the Commonwealth because of its apartheid laws, to which the other former British colonies and the United Kingdom were hostile. The Royal positions and titles disappeared, and the role of head of state was transferred to the newly elected State President of the Republic of South Africa.

In September 1983, Libertas experienced a great change with the adoption of the new South African constitution during the mandate of Prime Minister P.W. Botha. The new constitution officially came into force the following year, in September 1984. The position of Prime Minister was abolished, while the State President was now the head of government as well as being the head of state. After that, Libertas became one of the official residences of the State President, along with Tuynhuys and Westbrooke (since renamed Genadendal) on the Groote Schuur estate in Cape Town and King's House (since renamed Dr John Dube House) in Durban.

Upon the end of apartheid in May 1994, the office of State President was abolished. It was replaced with the office of President of the Republic of South Africa. Libertas, Tuynhuys, Genadendal and King's House continued to be official residences of the new office of President.

=== The house of Nelson Mandela ===
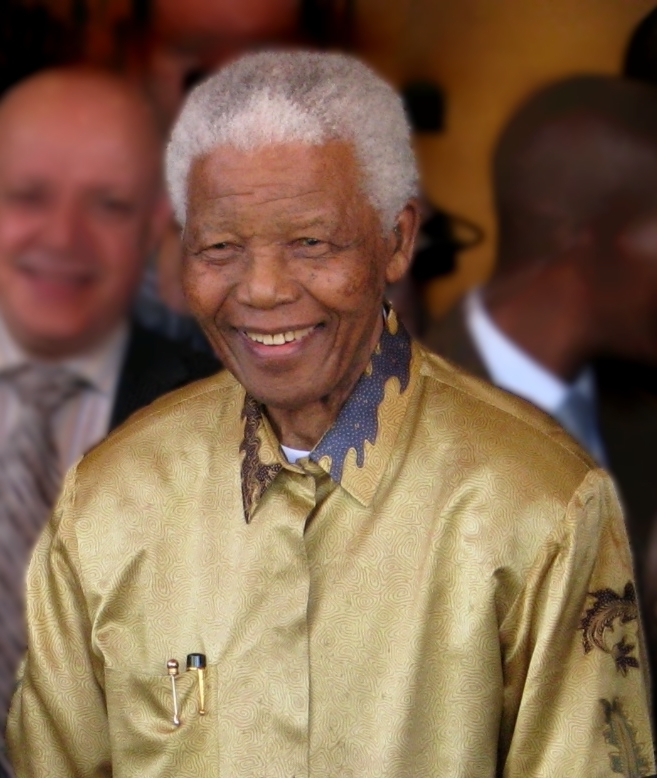

The first multiracial election was held in 1994 and Nelson Madiba Mandela was elected President of the Republic of South Africa (62.6% of the vote). He became the first black head of state in South Africa.

During his term of office, President Mandela attached great importance to the symbols of African culture. His election made it possible to re-Africanise a country hitherto dominated by the white minority. He thus decided to rename Libertas as Mahlamba Ndlopfu (the "New Dawn" in Tsonga language). According to his vision, this place was to become a symbol of the growing African heritage and influence in the country.

=== 21st century ===
Since May 1994, Mahlamba Ndlopfu has been a symbol of African empowerment in South Africa, and all the Presidents elected since Mandela have come from the black community. The site and its gardens are subject to daily maintenance and constant renovation in order to place the President and his government in the best possible conditions.

== Architecture ==
=== Gerard Moerdijk, the architect ===
The architect of Libertas was Gerard Moerdijk (1890–1958). He came from a family of Dutch immigrants and was even deported during the Second Boer War. He was passionate about architecture, especially the Renaissance, so, after his studies in Pretoria, he went to France (École des Beaux Arts) and Italy (British School of Archeology, Rome).

Upon his return in 1913, he specialised in the realisation of churches with a special touch, since he did not follow the traditional method. He received nearly 80 orders for churches in South Africa, but also in the Rhodesias and South-West Africa. Moerdjik was particularly interested in Greek theatres. His most famous masterpiece is the commemorative Voortrekker Monument, completed in 1949.

In order to realise Libertas, Gerard Moerdijk won a competition organised by the Public Works Department and Prime Minister Jan Smuts.

=== Cape-Dutch style ===
Libertas was built in the atypical style of Gerard Moerdijk, mixing classical European architecture with colonial and African influences. It was mainly inspired by the Cape Dutch style, an architecture specific to the settlers, especially farmers, established in South Africa. It was brought by the Dutch and re-used by the British in the Cape region.

The white colour of the walls of Mahlamba Ndlopfu is inspired from the 18th century Boer farms in the Cape area. The flourishing nature around is also part of the Cape Dutch environment, although Moerdijk wanted to keep a structured garden around the residence. The architect also insisted on modernising the techniques and limited the use of woods which was not resistant enough for such a construction.

=== The Bryntirion Estate ===
Mahlamba Ndlopfu was built on the Bryntirion Estate. Besides the Presidential residence, the official residence of the Deputy President, Oliver Tambo House, is also located on the Bryntirion Estate. Oliver Tambo House is currently occupied by Paul Mashatile, Ramaphosa’s Deputy President since 2023. The estate also incorporates a Presidential guest house and official residences for several Cabinet ministers. In total the zone contains 28 properties (called erfs), and they are all owned by the Republic of South Africa (except for erf 16).

The estate is 107 hectares (264 acres) and its infrastructures allow the government officials spare-time activities. There are 15 tennis courts, a 9-hole Presidential golf course and several private swimming pools in Bryntirion. A helipad was also built in order to facilitate governmental travelling.

Because of its political importance, the Bryntirion Estate is a highly protected place. The security system is made of 202 surveillance cameras, 4 massive gatehouses and 8.1km of anti-climb motion detection fences which were built in 2007. The fences eventually cost 90 million Rand (USD12.8 million), which makes each metre worth 11,000 Rand.

== Political influence ==
=== Place of power ===
As the chief official Presidential residence, Mahlamba Ndlopfu is not only useful as a house to live in. It is also the place where the President holds his meetings with the important government representatives, and where he sometimes invites his foreign equivalents.

In 1994, when Nelson Mandela became President of the Republic of South Africa, an important inauguration ceremony was organised at the Union Buildings in Pretoria. He decided to invite his political friends from all around the world such as Fidel Castro (Cuban leader) or Al Gore (US Vice-President). Mandela therefore received many of his powerful guests in Mahlamba Ndlopfu after the ceremony.

In July 1994, the French President, François Mitterrand, was the first foreign head of state to make an official state visit since 1947 and was eventually invited to Mahlamba Ndlopfu. Because of the apartheid system, international political leaders refused to go to South Africa until the election of Mandela. Many influential figures followed Mitterrand, such as Queen Elizabeth II of the United Kingdom (and formerly Queen of South Africa), the German Chancellor Helmut Kohl, and the U.S. President, Bill Clinton.

=== Symbolic place ===
Mahlamba Ndlopfu as an embodiment of South African Presidential power has had a great symbolic value over time.

First, the use of the architectural Cape Dutch style, which was used to build Libertas in 1940, was picked for its important symbolic value. It was chosen to prove that the place where the head of government lived was marked with colonial heritage. It was at the same time honouring the ancestors of the white minority of South Africa, and the typical style of the region. The name Libertas was chosen in order to highlight the value of freedom.

Moreover, this place became an important symbol of the African influence when it changed its name during President Mandela’s term. Indeed, Mandela gave a significant importance to the Africanisation of the country which had been dominated by colonial descendants for decades. Africanisation led to symbolic changes like the inclusion of African history on the education programme, the new South African flag, and the changing of the Libertas name to Mahlamba Ndlopfu.

== Occupants ==
- Prime Minister Jan C. Smuts (1870–1950) United Party. Occupant from 1940 to 1948.
- Prime Minister Daniel F. Malan (1874–1959) National Party. Occupant from 1948 to 1954
- Prime Minister Johannes G. Strijdom (1893–1958) National Party. Occupant from 1954 to 1958.
- Prime Minister Hendrik F. Verwoerd (1901–1966) National Party. Occupant from 1958 to 1966.
- Prime Minister Balthazar J. Vorster (1915–1983) National Party. Occupant from 1966 to 1978.
- Prime Minister and, later, State President (from 1984) Pieter W. Botha (1916–2006) National Party. Occupant from 1978 to 1989.

- State President Jan C. Heunis (1927–2006) National Party. Occupant from January to March 1989.
- State President Frederik Willem De Klerk (1936–2021) National Party. Occupant from 1989 to 1994.
- President Nelson Mandela (1918–2013) African National Congress. Occupant from 1994 to 1999.
- President Thabo Mbeki (born 1942) African National Congress. Occupant from 1999 to 2008.
- President Kgalema Motlanthe (born 1949) African National Congress. Occupant from 2008 to 2009.
- President Jacob Zuma (born 1942) African National Congress. Occupant from 2009 to 2018.
- President Cyril Ramaphosa (born 1952) African National Congress. Occupant since 2018.

== See also ==
- Government Houses of South Africa
- Government Houses of the British Empire
- Genadendal Residence
- List of Castles and Fortifications in South Africa
