= Highstead (Cape Town) =

Estate in Cape Town, South Africa

Highstead is an estate in Groote Schuur and is the official residence of the deputy president of South Africa in Cape Town, South Africa. The house was built in the mid-20th century and was originally a government minister's house. In the late 1990s, the house was renovated and expanded.
