= Gerard Moerdijk =

South African architect (1890–1958)

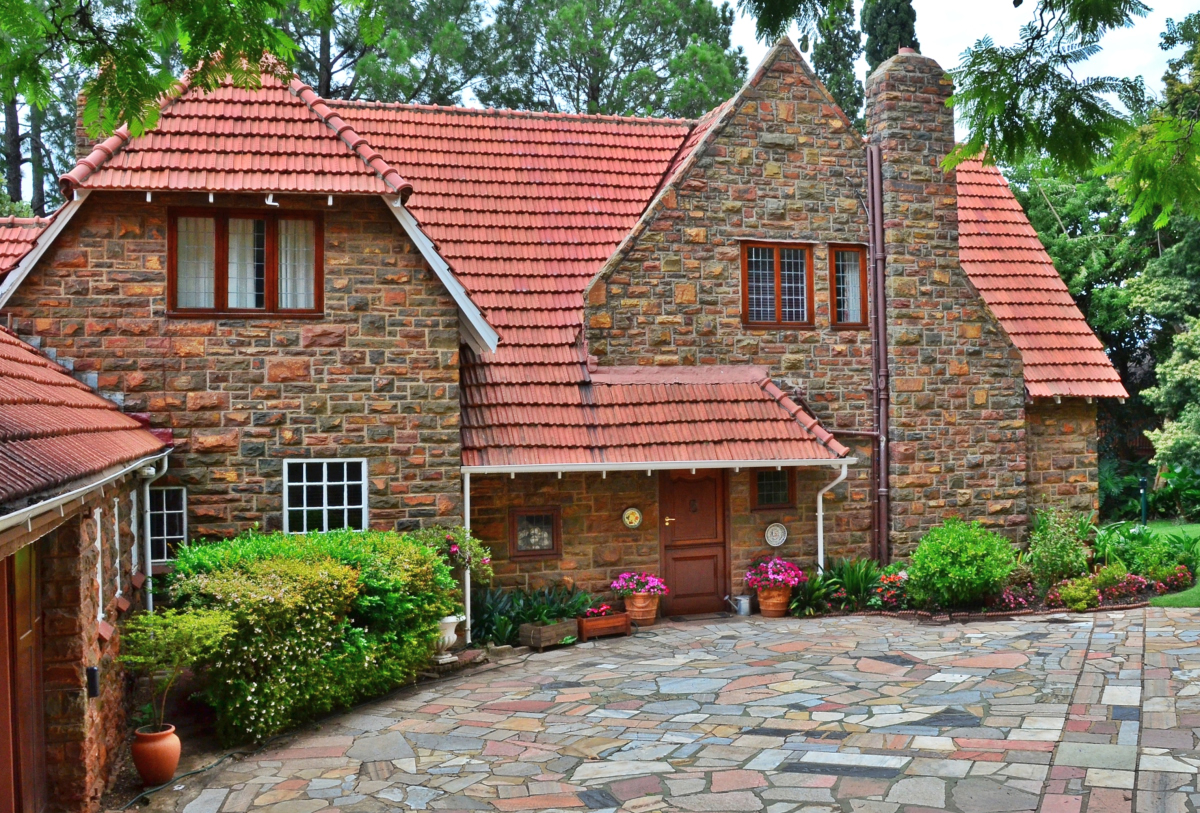
House Moerdyk, Pretoria

Gerard Leendert Pieter Moerdijk (4 March 1890 in Zwaershoek farm near Nylstroom, Transvaal – 29 March 1958 in Nylstroom), also known as Gerard Moerdyk, was a South African architect best known for designing the Voortrekker Monument in Pretoria.

== Early life, education and career ==
Both Moerdyk's parents were Dutch immigrants, who moved to South Africa in 1888.

During the Second Boer War (1899–1902) Gerard Moerdyk (then aged 10) was interned in the Standerton concentration camp with his mother, two brothers and two sisters. After the war, the family lived in Pretoria where Gerard went to the forerunner of Pretoria Boys High School. He matriculated with honours in 1909 and qualified as an architect at the Architectural Association in England. He also studied in France for a while and was exposed to classical Roman and Renaissance architecture in Italy.

Moerdyk was the first South African to be an Associate of the Royal Institute of British Architects.

Moerdyk returned to South Africa in 1913 and received first prize for the design of a church in Bothaville. He started his own practice and received more than eighty commissions to design churches. In his designs Moerdyk broke with the traditional crucifix plan, and replaced it with an octagonal formation, and incorporated domes, crescent-shaped windows and Cape Dutch gables. Another Church, the Nederduitse Hervormde Kerk, was designed in 1935. He was a member of the Afrikaner Broederbond

He also designed several bank buildings, hospitals, houses and city halls. Commissioned works for which he is famous is the Reserve Bank building in Bloemfontein, the Libertas building in Pretoria (now known as Mahlamba Ndlopfu) and the Merensky Library at the University of Pretoria. This last building, now known as the Old Merensky Library – since a new library has been built – houses the Edoardo Villa Museum with the leading collection of sculptures by the artist Eduardo Villa. . The foundation stone for this building was laid in 1937 by General Jan Smuts, then Prime Minister of South Africa. In 1991 it was declared a National Monument. It was later redesignated a provincial heritage site and in 2012 became a national heritage site.

=== Voortrekker Monument ===
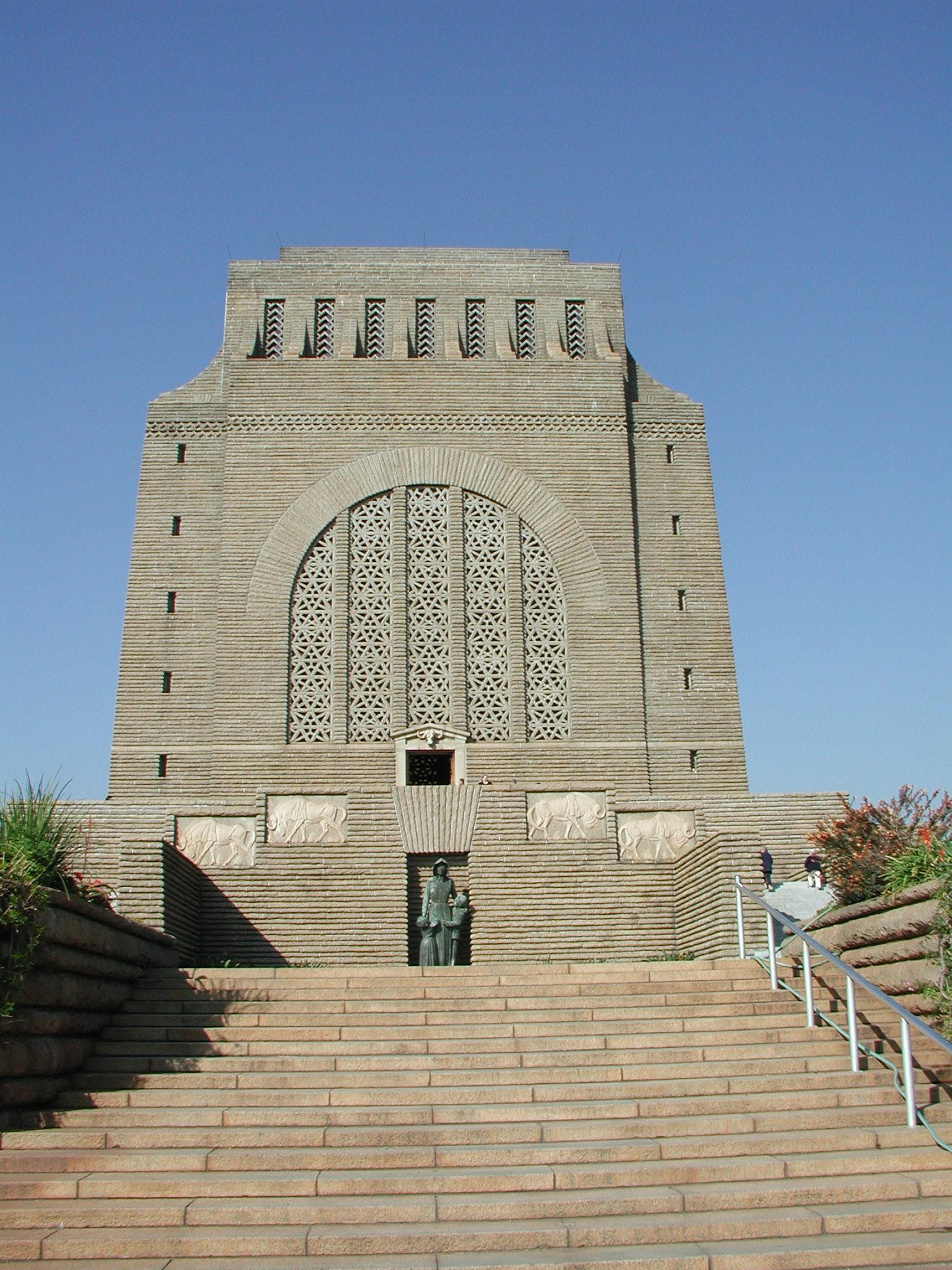
Voortrekker Monument in Pretoria

The Voortrekker Monument on Proclamation Hill at the southern outskirts of Pretoria is considered to be Moerdyk's masterpiece. He was a South African Freemason.

The Central "Volks" (People's) Monuments Committee started a "Structure Committee" which approached the public in 1936 for suggestions about the contents and form of a monument. Several sketches from sculptors, architects and other artists were submitted. Moerdyk's design was eventually chosen. E.C Pienaar and A.d. Bouman designed the sculptural laager, or ring of ox-wagons, around the monument.

The South African Academy for Arts and Science awarded Moerdyk an honorary membership in 1936 and in 1950 the University of South Africa awarded him an honorary doctorate.

== Legacy ==
The Dutch Reformed Church in Piet Retief was designed and built in 1921.

A well-known Colonial African restaurant in the Pretoria suburb Arcadia is named Gerard Moerdyk Restaurant, after him.

Pretoria also has an arts district on Gerard Moerdyk Street in the suburb of Sunnyside. It is known as The Overzicht Artists' Village and consists of old cottages, which were built around the 19th century. The village has theatres, craft shops, restaurants and an education museum.

Moerdijk's family home in Pretoria, Moerdijkhuis, was declared a national monument in 1986 and was turned into a guesthouse by Moerdijk's grandson and his wife, in order to enable access to the monument while ensuring economic sustainability of this national asset.

== See also ==
- Spatial Symbolism in the Voortrekker Monument
