= Bryntirion Estate =

Presidential estate in Pretoria, South Africa

- Interactive map of Bryntirion Estate
- Location: George Washington Boulevard, Bryntirion, Pretoria, Gauteng, South Africa
- Coordinates: 25°44′23″S 28°13′36″E
- Area: 107 ha (260 acres)

Bryntirion Estate is an estate in Pretoria, South Africa. It incorporates the Mahlamba Ndlopfu residence of the president of South Africa, the deputy president's residence (called the OR Tambo House), the presidential guest house, many homes of cabinet ministers, 15 tennis courts, and a 9 hole presidential golf course with a helipad.

The estate is 1.07 square kilometres (107 hectares or 264 acres). The perimeter security system includes 202 CCTV cameras, 4 gatehouses and 8.1 km of anti-climb motion detection fences. The perimeter fences cost R90 million (USD12.8 million) to build in 2007. R90 million for 8.1 km is approximately R11 million per kilometre or R11 000 per metre.

The Bryntirion Estate contains 28 erfs (properties). All the Bryntirion erven are owned by the Republic of South Africa.

| Erf Number | Street Number | Street Name | Erf Area (square metres) |
|---|---|---|---|
| 1 | 21 | George Washington Boulevard | 20603 |
| 2 | 20 | George Washington Boulevard | 9532 |
| 3 | 26 | George Washington Boulevard | 11330 |
| 4 | 17 | Wenlock Road | 10370 |
| 5 | 13 | Wenlock Road | 12344 |
| 6 | 156 | Dumbarton Road | 7255 |
| 7 | 15 | Colroyn Road | 11585 |
| 8 | 14 | Wenlock Road | 9632 |
| 9 | 11 | Colroyn Road | 5992 |
| 10 | 12 | Colroyn Road | 8601 |
| 11 | 16 | Colroyn Road | 9778 |
| 12 | 18 | Colroyn Road | 2920 |
| 13 | 13 | Nassau Road | 3154 |
| 14 | 9 | Rothsay Road | 2956 |
| 15 | 13 | Rothsay Road | 3070 |
| 16 | 166 | Dumbarton Road | 3399 |
| 17 | 176 | Dumbarton Road | 3017 |
| 18 | 182 | Dumbarton Road | 2868 |
| 19 | 186 | Dumbarton Road | 3014 |
| 20 | 914 | Church Street | 3272 |
| 21 | 932 | Church Street | 3171 |
| 22 | 950 | Church Street | 3455 |
| 23 | 18 | Nassau Road | 3589 |
| 24 | 14 | Nassau Road | 3870 |
| 25 | 970 | Church Street | 7976 |
| 26 | 23 | George Washington Boulevard | 17510 |
| 27 | 25 | George Washington Boulevard | 41889 |
| 28 | 27 | George Washington Boulevard | 74 |
| Total area: | | | 226 226m² or 22.6 Hectares |

== Erf 16 ==
Erf 16 was the only privately owned property that falls within the area which is referred to as the Bryntirion Estate. During 1993, Erf 16 was bought by a purchaser from the then government shortly before the first democratic elections. During 1997 another buyer, Rashid Aboobaker, purchased the property, which had been advertised for sale in the open market. At the time it was zoned for government use. The owner renovated and extended the house on the property. During 1999 the property was rezoned for use as a guest house. However, it has since then only been used as a family home. Government tried to expropriate erf 16 for security reasons. Aboobaker challenged the expropriation and claimed he lost R12.5 million because of the unilateral decision to include his land in the estate. In 2011 Aboobaker's appeal to the Supreme Court of Appeal was rejected.
