= Groote Schuur =

Historical estate in Cape Town, now a museum

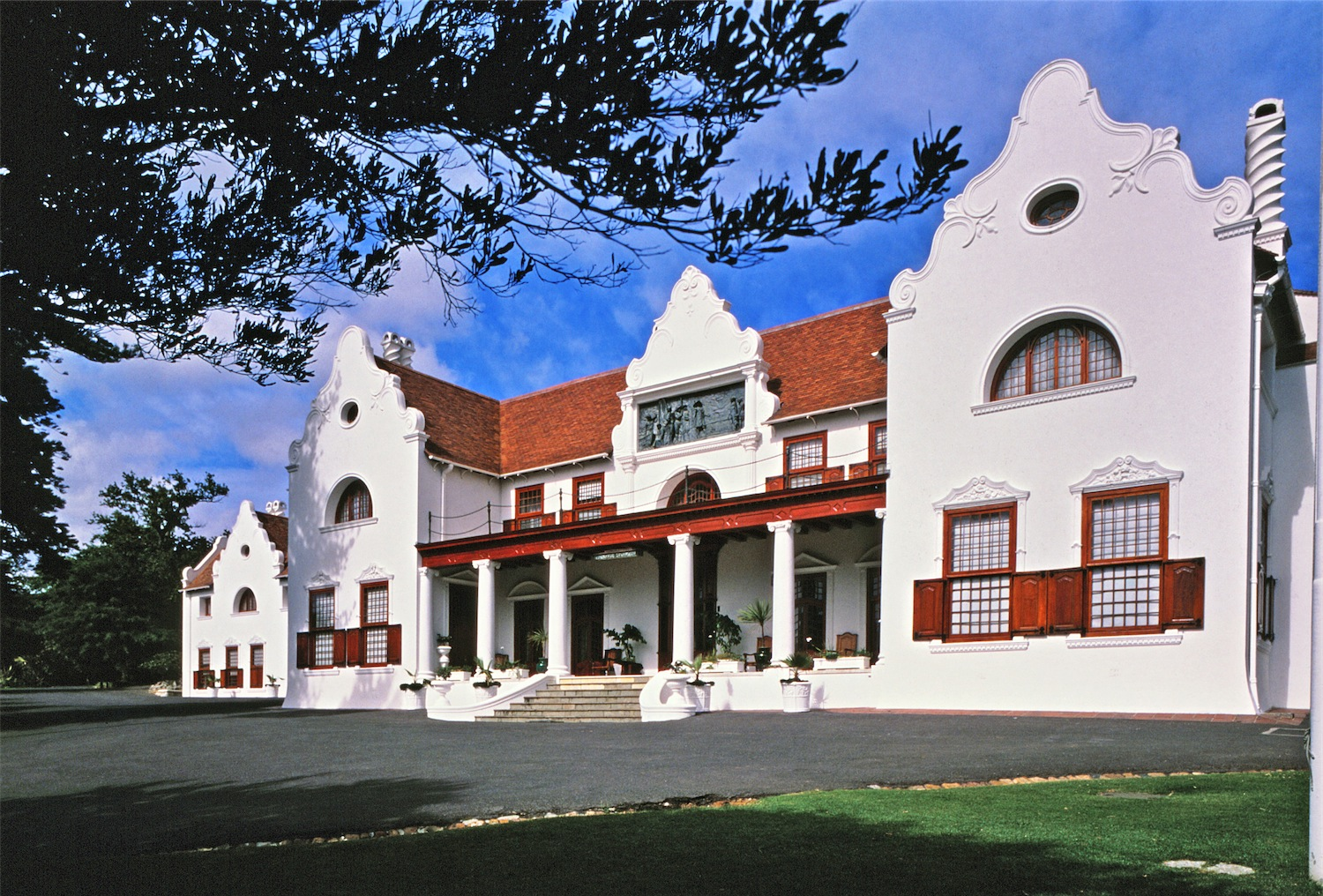

- Location within Cape Town
- 33°57′49.61″S 18°27′50.40″E
- Location: Rondebosch, Cape Town, South Africa.

History
- Built: 18th century

Site notes
- Architect: Sir Herbert Baker (19th century refurbishment)
- Architectural style: Cape Dutch

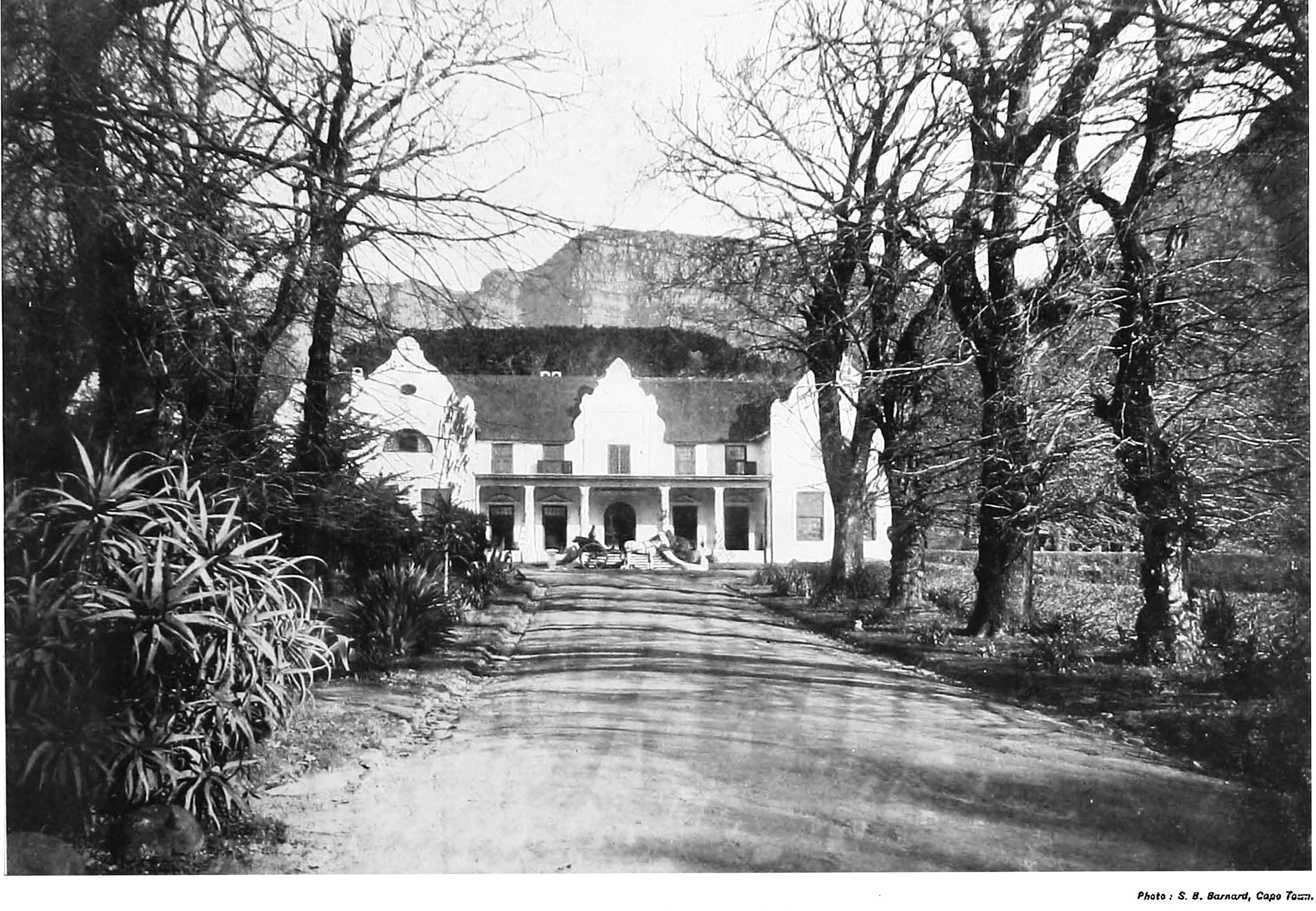
Groote Schuur in 1899.

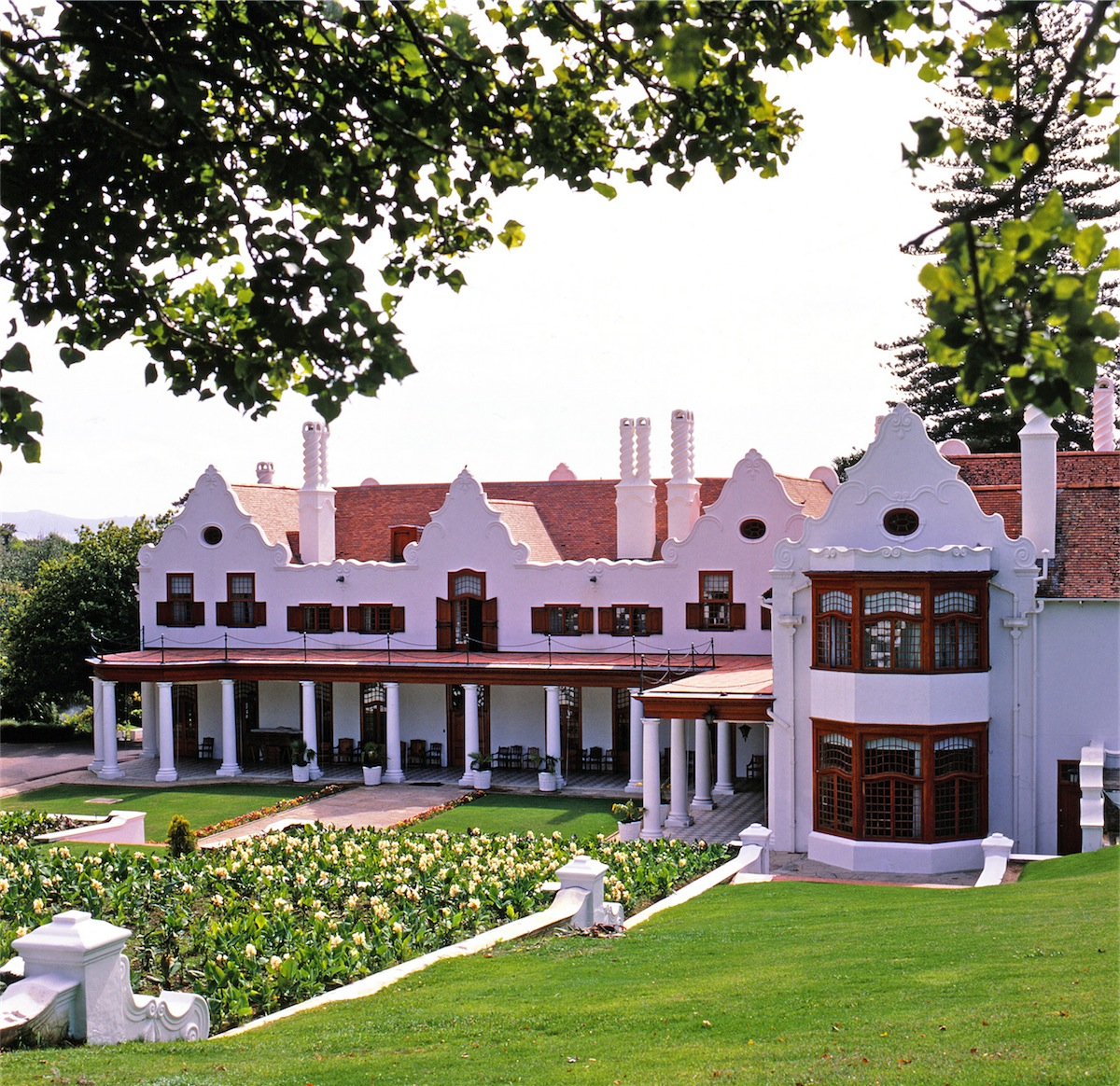
A view of Groote Schuur in 1988

Groote Schuur (pronounced [ˈɣroːtə ˈsxyːr]; Dutch for 'big shed') is an estate in Cape Town, South Africa. In 1657, the estate was owned by the Dutch East India Company which used it partly as a granary. Later, the farm and farmhouse was sold into private hands. Groote Schuur was later acquired by William De Smidt, and remained in the family's possession until it was sold by Abraham De Smidt, Surveyor General of the Cape Colony, in 1878, and was bought by Hester Anna van der Byl of the prominent Van Der Byl / Coetsee family. In 1891 Cecil Rhodes leased it from her. He later bought it from her in 1893 for £60,000, and had it converted and refurbished by the architect Sir Herbert Baker. The Cape Dutch building, located in Rondebosch, on the slopes of Devil's Peak, the outlying shoulder of Table Mountain, was originally part of the Dutch East India Company's granary constructed in the seventeenth century.

Little of the original house remained after a fire in 1896. The traditional thatched roof was replaced by sturdier Welsh slates. Rhodes gave no strict instructions as to what he wanted from Baker. Rhodes abhorred any mechanically made items (such as hinges for windows) in the house and set out to remove them and have them replaced with brass and bronze items that would be cast. Baker replaced the front of the house, added a long stoep in the back and constructed a new wing. The wing contained a billiard room and master bedroom above on the second floor that contained a large bay window overlooking Devil's Peak. He also added a grand hall with a massive fireplace. The house is home to 4 Flemish 17th century tapestries, depicting America, Africa, Europe and Victory.

Sir Herbert Baker also played a significant role in the furnishing of the house. After initially furnishing with modern furniture from London, Rhodes, influenced by Baker, began a shift from the modern to more traditional Cape furniture. This would mark the beginning of Cecil Rhodes’ collection of colonial furnishings. Baker was also commissioned to assist with Rhodes House, Oxford, in which he incorporated some of the features of Groote Schuur as a tribute to Rhodes.

Among his personal collection at the house, Rhodes had several artefacts the explorer Theodore Bent removed from the Great Zimbabwe ruins in 1891 during his excavations there (Rhodes having co-financed the project), including an iconic soapstone bird in the library.

The gardens of the house were as Rhodes demanded 'masses of colour'. Surrounding the house was a mass of roses, hydrangeas, cannas, bougainvilleas and fuchsias. Farther away from the house on the slopes of Devil's Peak, Rhodes kept antelopes, zebra, eland, wildebeest and ostriches.

Rhodes was always a generous host while at Groote Schuur. He used the residence as much as a business and political headquarters as a home. His life at the time was one of dinner parties and meetings on the stoep, where he would be joined by as many as fifty people.

== Notable residents and events ==
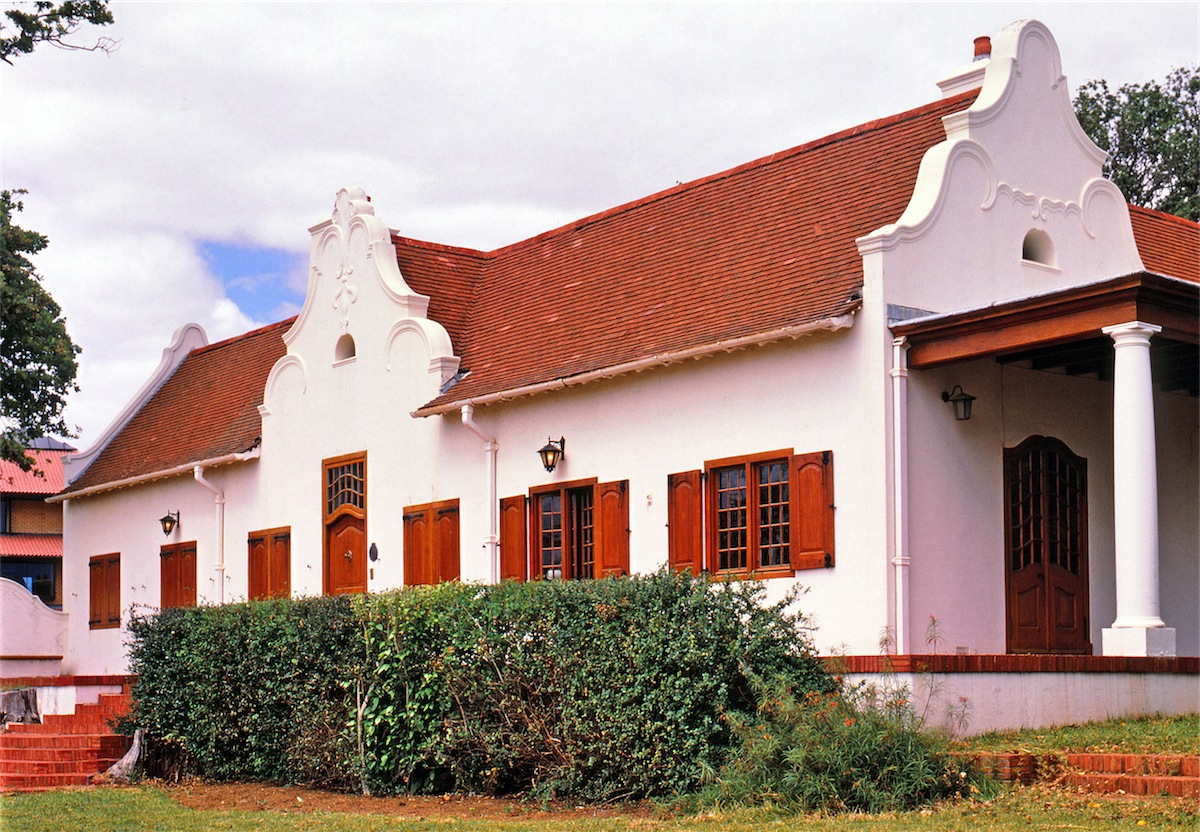
"The Woolsack," a house formerly located within the Groote Schuur estate where Rudyard Kipling used to stay when visiting Cape Town.

"The Woolsack" is a house that was previously part of the estate during Rhodes' lifetime. It was transferred to the University of Cape Town in 1980 where it is now used as student accommodation. Located within walking distance of Groote Schuur, The Woolsack was used as a guest house by Rhodes, most notably hosting the noted British poet and writer Rudyard Kipling when he used to visit Cape Town for his winter holidays between 1898 and 1908. By then known as the Poet of the Empire, Kipling would become a friend of Rhodes during this period and wrote poetry and newspaper articles in support of the British cause in the Boer War and the formation of the Union of South Africa.

From 1910 to 1984, it was the official Cape residence of the Prime Ministers of South Africa and continued as a presidential residence of P. W. Botha and F. W. De Klerk. However, P. W. Botha never resided there, opting rather to live in Westbrooke.

In May 1956, Time magazine reported, "a party was held at Groote Schuur for South Africa's Nationalist Prime Minister Johannes Strydom after he had won the parliamentary campaign to continue white supremacy in a land of 2.6 million whites and 10 million nonwhites. The party was given by some of the younger nationalists and their wives to honor him. They organized a caravan of 130 vehicles and slowly drove up to the Groote Schuur. After reaching the house, they began to sing old Boer war songs—the Volksliederen of the Transvaal and Orange Free State. A speech was given by Mrs. M. D. J. Koster, the only female member of the parliament, 'Every white woman and every white mother thanks you from the depth of her heart.' Strydom’s response to this was, 'We must never be swerved from our goals ... the struggle must continue.'"

The building was the site for the signing of the historic "Groote Schuur Minute" between Nelson Mandela, of the African National Congress (ANC), and F. W. De Klerk, the then State President of the Republic of South Africa, on 4 May 1990. The document was a commitment between the two parties towards the resolution of the existing climate of violence and intimidation as well as a commitment to stability and to a peaceful process of negotiations. A working party was established to investigate the granting of temporary immunity to ANC cadres, to advise on how to deal with the release of political prisoners and to make recommendations on the definition of political offences.

Under Nelson Mandela, as President of the Republic of South Africa, the Genadendal building (formerly called Westbrooke) became the Cape Town residence of the South African President. Groote Schuur is now a museum and open to the public only by appointment.

== See also ==
- Genadendal Residence
- List of Castles and Fortifications in South Africa
- Highstead, official residence of the Deputy President
