= Genadendal Residence =

Official Cape Town residence of the President of South Africa

- Interactive map of the Genadendal Residence area
- Former names: Onder Schuur, then Westbrooke in 1828

General information
- Architectural style: Victorian-Georgian
- Location: Groote Schuur Estate, Cape Town, South Africa
- Coordinates: 33.9643°S 18.4652°E
- Construction started: 18th century

Genadendal Residence [χəˈnɑːdəndal] is the official Cape Town residence of the president of South Africa, situated on the Groote Schuur estate in Rondebosch. It has been the official residence since 1994 when Nelson Mandela took up residence here rather than the main Groote Schuur manor house. The mixed Victorian-Georgian residence, formerly known as Westbrooke, is named after the town of Genadendal – itself an Afrikaans word meaning "Valley of Mercy", until it was changed to the current name in 1995.

The residence first came into existence in the early 18th century as a grain barn, and was converted into a residence in the mid-1800s.

== See also ==
- Mahlamba Ndlopfu
- List of Castles and Fortifications in South Africa
