= Thomas William Bowler =

English painter (1812–1869)

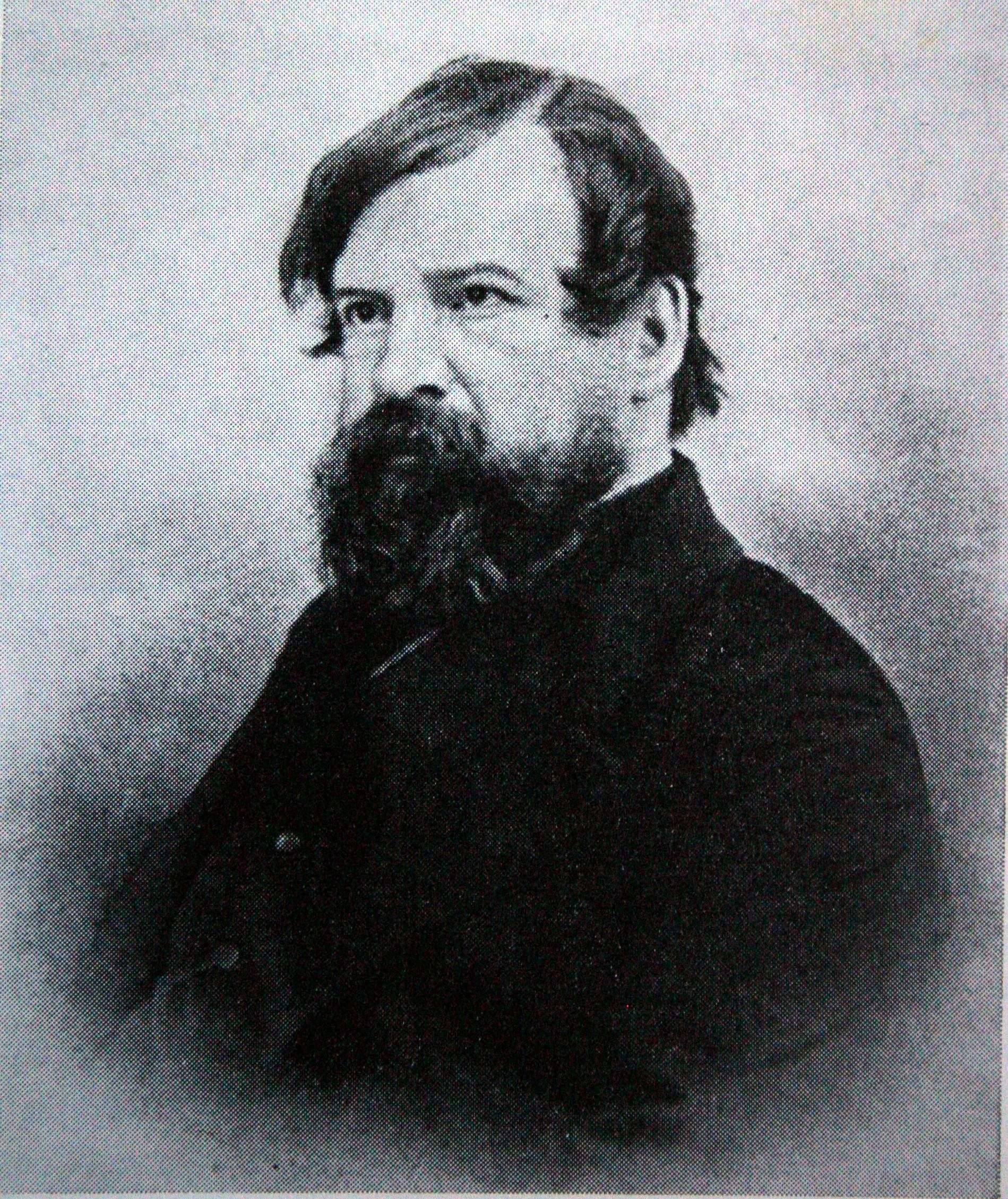
Thomas Bowler (1844)

Thomas William Bowler (9 December 1812 – 24 October 1869), was a self-taught British landscape painter who lived for some years at the Cape of Good Hope, and published a series of views of Cape Town and its neighbourhood. He is notable for having depicted some 35 years of the Cape's history in landscapes and seascapes.

== Life ==
Bowler was born in Tring, Hertfordshire, in 1812, the son of William Bowler and his wife Sarah Butterfield,

He landed at the Cape on 5 January 1834 as a servant to Thomas Maclear, the new Astronomer Royal, whose service he left in July 1835, taking employment with Capt. Richard Wolfe, Commandant of Robben Island, and remaining until the end of 1838.

Bowler then started offering his services in Cape Town as a "drawing master and landscape painter". He took up a position as drawing master at the Diocesan College, and from 1842 at the South African College. In the same year that he published his first lithograph, The Landing of Troops at Port Natal being covered by H.M.S. Southampton. This was followed by Four Views of Cape Town in 1844. He also planned an 1845 portfolio of prints Five Views of Natal, but failed to find sufficient subscribers. The originals were returned to South Africa in 1960 by Lord de Saumarez.

In 1850 he published The Anti-convict Agitation, a print of the large gathering held in Cape Town on 4 July 1849, objecting to the landing of convicts from the penal transportation ship Neptune.

In May 1854 he returned to England, where he received tuition from the artist James Duffield Harding, and was back in Cape Town in March 1855. He painted two historically important pictures of the start of the 1859 Cape Town to Wellington railway line, the first in South Africa; and another two of its opening in November 1863. Three of these paintings were published as engravings in the Illustrated London News.

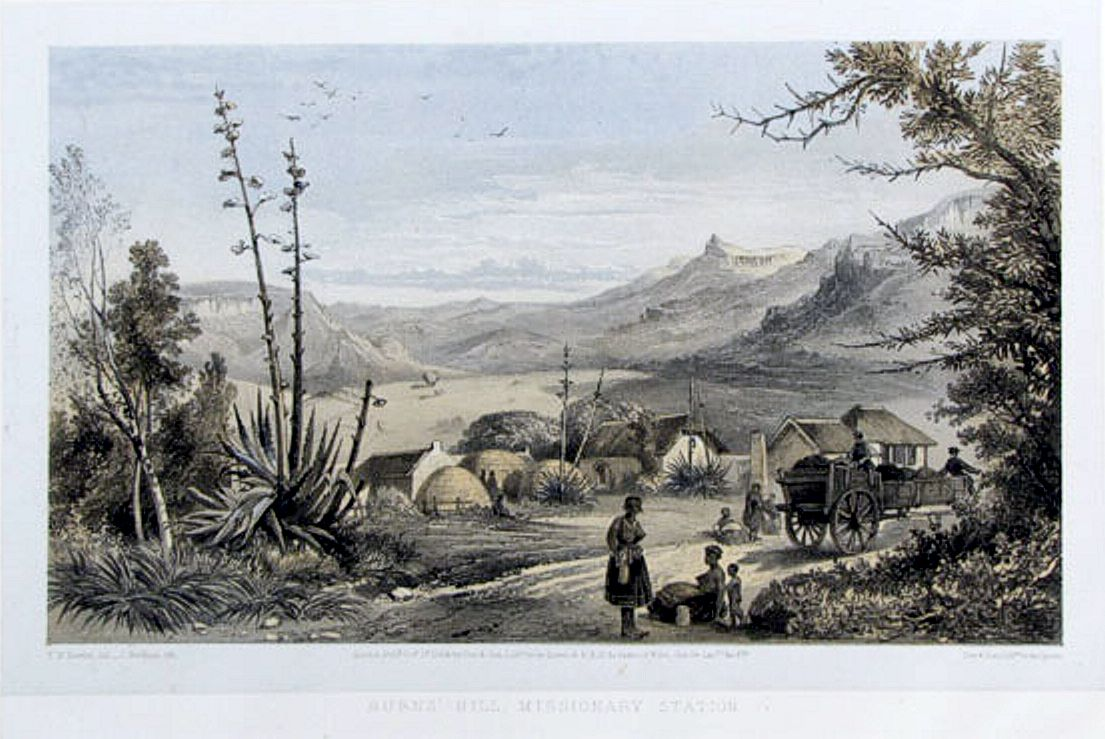
Burns' Hill Mission Station on the Keiskamma River

During his time in South Africa, Bowler travelled widely in the Cape Colony, and visited Knysna and Port Elizabeth along the Garden Route. His journeys produced a large number of paintings and sketches such as The Kaffir Wars and the British Settlers in South Africa (1865), and the Pictorial album of Cape Town, with views of Simonstown, Port Elizabeth and Grahamstown (1866).

Also in 1866 was Bowler's voyage to Mauritius. He planned to publish a portfolio of 20 lithographs of views on the island, but support was not forthcoming. Seven of the original watercolours are in South Africa, while at least three are in Mauritius.

Bowler played a leading role in the founding and legalising of Art Unions at the Cape. Being of a quarrelsome nature, his frequent disagreements were regularly aired in the local press.

In August 1868 he travelled to England via Mauritius and Egypt to arrange the production of his portfolio Twenty Views of Mauritius, but died soon after arrival. Bowler produced some 540 watercolours, oil paintings and sketches of which 64 were published as lithographs. Two of his works were published as engravings, not counting his illustrations for books and magazines. His works are held in the African Homes Trust Collection, the Cape Archives, and the Mendelssohn Collection in the Library of Parliament.

He was married twice, to Jane Hawthorne and Maria Jolly, the marriages producing ten children.

Bowler died in London in 1869.

== Bibliography ==
- F.R. Bradlow, Thomas Bowler, His Life and Work, Cape Town, 1967
- F.R. Bradlow, Thomas Bowler in Mauritius. A detail in the history of contacts between the Cape of Good Hope and Mauritius 1866-1868, Cape Town, 1970, A.A. Balkema Publ.
