= King's House (Durban) =

Official residence of the President of South Africa

Dr. John Dube house in Durban is the third official residence of the President of South Africa and the Deputy President of South Africa when they visit KwaZulu-Natal. It is built in an Edwardian style.

The design of the building was carried out by A.E. Dainton, Chief Architect of the Department of Public Works and an architectural firm, Stott and Kirby. The construction of the residence was announced in 1901 by Mayor John Nicol with £15,000 voted for the building which was later changed to £28,000. The residence was completed in 1904.

Its first resident was Sir Henry Bale, then Chief Justice of Natal, who moved into the house on June 29, 1904. The house was also used to accommodate the British royal family on their 1947 visit to South Africa.

In 2012, President Jacob Zuma renamed the property, King’s House to Dr John L. Dube House, to honour Dr John Langalibalele Dube who was an educationist, journalist and first President of the ruling African National Congress.

The building was as unfit for human habitation following flood damage as a result of storms in the area in 2016.

It has been suggested that the president gives up the property to the King of the Zulus, Misuzulu kaZwelithini to use as his official Durban residence.
