= President of South Africa =

Head of state and government

President of the Republic of South Africa
- 10 other official names: President van Suid-Afrika (Afrikaans); Umongameli waseNingizimu Afrika (Zulu); uMongameli waseMzantsi Afrika (Xhosa); Mopresidente wa Afrika Borwa (Northern Sotho); Moporesitente wa Aforika Borwa (Tswana); Moporesitente wa Aforika Borwa (Sotho); Puresidente wa Afrika-Dzonga (Tsonga); uMengameli weleNingizimu Afrika (Swazi); Muphuresidennde wa Afrika Tshipembe (Venda); uMongameli weSewula Afrika (Southern Ndebele)
- Presidential seal

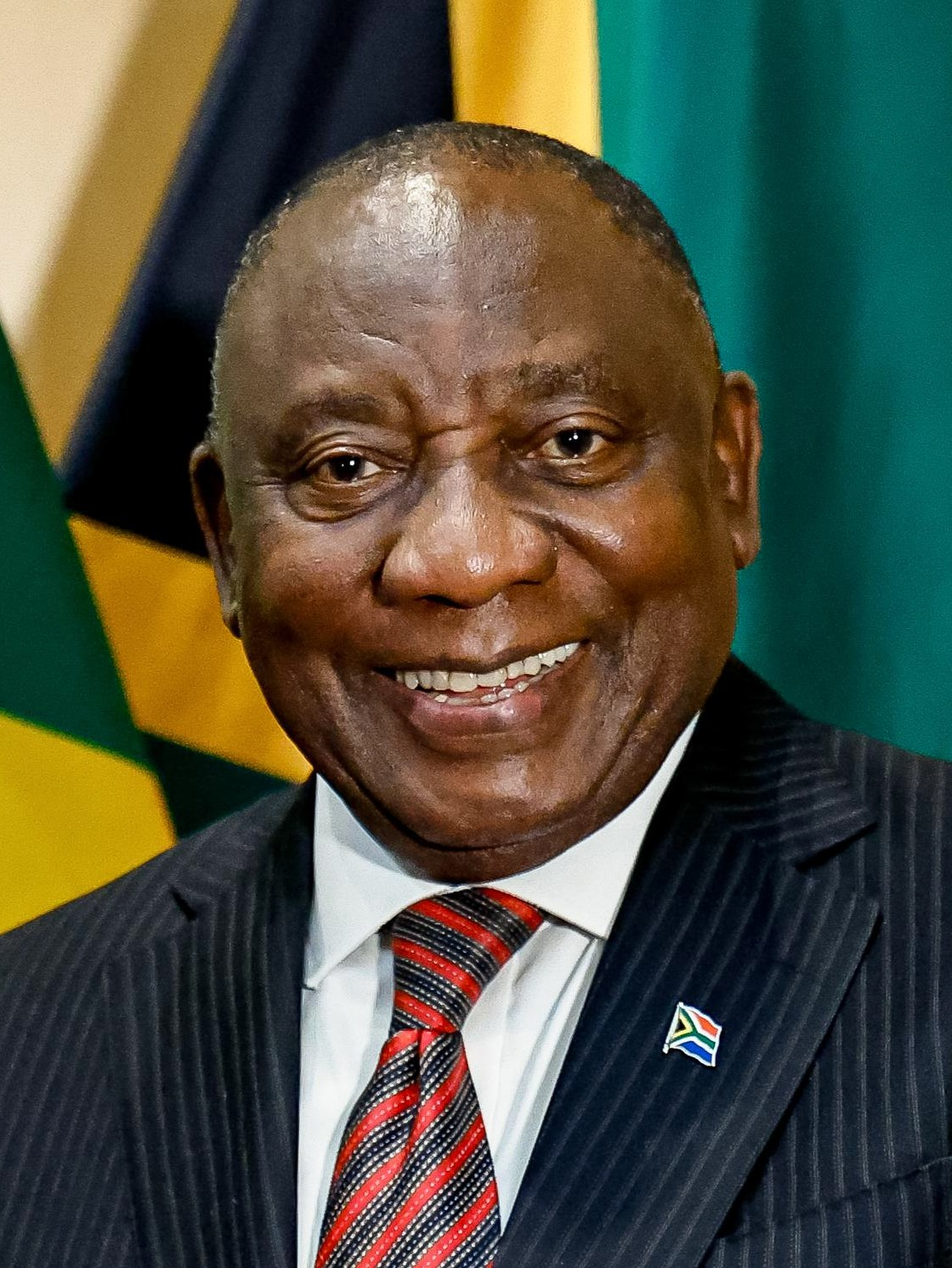
- Incumbent; Cyril Ramaphosa since 15 February 2018
- Government of South Africa
- Style: Mr. President (informal); His Excellency (formal, diplomatic)
- Type: Head of state; Head of government; Commander-in-chief
- Member of: Cabinet
- Residence: Mahlamba Ndlopfu (Pretoria) (official residence); Genadendal (Cape Town); Dr. John L. Dube House (Durban)
- Seat: Union Buildings
- Appointer: National Assembly of South Africa
- Term length: Five years; renewable once
- Constituting instrument: Constitution of South Africa (1996)
- Precursor: State President
- Formation: 10 May 1994; 32 years ago
- First holder: Nelson Mandela
- Deputy: Deputy President
- Salary: R3.34 million per annum
- Website: www.thepresidency.gov.za

The president of South Africa is the head of state and head of government of the Republic of South Africa. The president directs the executive branch of the government and is the commander-in-chief of the South African National Defence Force. Between 1961 and 1994, the office of head of state was the state presidency.

The president is elected by the National Assembly, the lower house of Parliament, and is usually the leader of the largest party, which has been the African National Congress since the first multiracial election was held on 27 April 1994. The Constitution limits the president's time in office to two five-year terms. The first president to be elected under the new constitution was Nelson Mandela. The incumbent is Cyril Ramaphosa, who was elected by the National Assembly on 15 February 2018 following the resignation of Jacob Zuma.

Under the interim constitution (valid from 1994 to 1996), there was a Government of National Unity, in which a member of Parliament (MP) from the largest opposition party was entitled to a position as deputy president. Along with Thabo Mbeki, the last apartheid president, F. W. de Klerk also served as deputy president, in his capacity as the leader of the National Party which was the second-largest party in the new Parliament. But De Klerk later resigned and went into opposition with his party. A voluntary coalition government continues to exist under the new constitution (adopted in 1996), although there have been no appointments of opposition politicians to the post of deputy president since.

The president is required to be a member of the National Assembly at the time of the election. Upon election, the president immediately resigns their seat for the duration of the presidential term. The president may be removed either by a motion of no-confidence or an impeachment trial.

== Origins ==
A number of manifestations of the office of president have existed. Aspects of these offices exist within the presidency today. The executive leadership of the British colonies of Natal and the Cape of Good Hope were vested in their governors. Likewise, it was invested in the presidents of the Boer republics of the Transvaal and the Orange Free State. Alternating sovereignty as a result of wars culminated in the Treaty of Vereeniging which concluded the South African War.

The Union of South Africa, a British Dominion, was established on 31 May 1910 with the British monarch as titular head of state, represented by a viceroy, the governor-general.

Following the 1960 referendum and subsequent declaration of the Republic of South Africa on 31 May 1961, the office of State President was created. It was originally a ceremonial post, but became an executive post in 1984 when a new constitution abolished the post of Prime Minister and transferred its powers to the state president. The country ended minority rule in 1994. The office of the president, and the roles that come with it, were established by chapter five of the Constitution of South Africa.

== Electoral system ==
South Africa has a distinctive system for the election of its president. Unlike other former British colonies and dominions who have adopted a parliamentary republican form of government and those that follow the Westminster system, South Africa's president is both head of state and head of government and commander-in-chief of the South African National Defence Force (SANDF). Contrary to presidential systems around the world, the president of South Africa is elected by the Parliament of South Africa rather than by the people directly. They are thus answerable to it in theory and able to influence legislation in practice as head of the majority party.

The president is elected at the first sitting of Parliament after an election, and whenever a vacancy arises. The president is elected by the National Assembly, the lower house of Parliament, from among its members. The chief justice must oversee the election. Once elected, a person is no longer a member of the National Assembly. They must then be sworn in as president within five days of the election. Should a vacancy arise, the date of a new election must be set by the chief justice, but not more than 30 days after the vacancy occurs.

The Constitution has thus prescribed a system combining both parliamentary and presidential systems in a unique manner. Only Botswana and a few other countries use a similar system. Between 1996 and 2003 Israel combined the two systems in an opposite way, with direct elections for the post of prime minister.

Although the presidency is the key institution, it is hedged about with numerous checks and balances that prevent its total dominance over the government, as was the case in many African countries. The presidential term is five years, with a limit of two terms. Thus the electoral system attempts (at least on paper) to prevent the accumulation of power in the president as occurred during Apartheid and as is the case currently in many other African countries.

== Succession ==
According to chapter five of the constitution, the president can only exercise the powers of the presidential office while within the Republic of South Africa. The president may appoint an acting president when travelling outside the country or unable to fulfill the duties of the office.

A presidential vacancy should be filled first by the deputy president, then a Cabinet minister selected by the president, thereafter a Cabinet minister selected by the Cabinet, and finally by the speaker of the National Assembly.

== Presidential powers ==
The president is the head of state, head of government and commander-in-chief of the South African National Defence Force. The rights, responsibilities and remuneration of the president are enumerated in Chapter V of the Constitution of South Africa and subsequent amendments and laws passed by the Parliament of South Africa.

The executive powers of the republic are vested in the president, who appoints various officials to positions listed in the Constitution, the most significant of which are the Cabinet ministers and justices of the Supreme Court of Appeal and the Constitutional Court. The president's Cabinet implements and enforces the Constitution and laws and carries out the president's political objectives. Judges are appointed on the advice of the Judicial Service Commission.

The president plays a role in the formation of legislation. The president can sign bills into laws or veto legislation (subject to an override), refer bills back to Parliament or to the Constitutional Court, or call for a referendum. The president summons parliament, and often delivers a State of the Nation Address at the beginning of each session.

The president is the commander-in-chief of the South African National Defence Force thereby possessing influence or control over foreign and security policy. The president is accorded the constitutional powers to declare war and make peace, negotiate and sign (although not ratify) treaties (and the alliances that may come with them), and receives and appoints diplomatic officials, confers honours and grants pardons.

== Presidents of South Africa since 1994 ==
Parties

African National Congress

No.	Portrait	Name (Birth–Death)	Elected	Term of office			Parliament	Political party	Government	Refs
No.	Portrait	Name (Birth–Death)	Elected	Took office	Left office	Time in office	Parliament	Political party	Government	Refs
1		Nelson Mandela (1918–2013)	1994	10 May 1994	14 June 1999	5 years, 35 days	22nd	ANC	Mandela (Reshuffle 1 · 2 · 3); ANC—NP—IFP	
1		Nelson Mandela (1918–2013)	1994	The first post-apartheid president of South Africa. The first black chief executive of South Africa, and the first elected in a fully representative democratic election. His government focused on dismantling the legacy of apartheid through tackling institutionalised racism, poverty and inequality, and fostering racial reconciliation. Politically an African nationalist and democratic socialist, he served as President of the African National Congress (ANC) party from 1991 to 1997.						
2		Thabo Mbeki (born 1942)	1999; 2004	14 June 1999	21 May 2004	9 years, 102 days	23rd	ANC	Mbeki I ANC—IFP	
2		Thabo Mbeki (born 1942)	1999; 2004	21 May 2004	24 September 2008	9 years, 102 days	24th	ANC	Mbeki II (Reshuffle 1 · 2)	
2		Thabo Mbeki (born 1942)	1999; 2004	The second post-apartheid president of South Africa. On 20 September 2008, with about nine months left in his second term, Mbeki announced his resignation after being recalled by the National Executive Committee of the ANC, following a conclusion by judge C. R. Nicholson of improper interference in the National Prosecuting Authority (NPA), including the prosecution of Jacob Zuma for corruption. On 12 January 2009, the Supreme Court of Appeal unanimously overturned judge Nicholson's judgment but the resignation stood.						
3		Kgalema Motlanthe (born 1949)	2008	25 September 2008	9 May 2009	228 days	24th	ANC	Motlanthe	
3		Kgalema Motlanthe (born 1949)	2008	The third post-apartheid president of South Africa. He was elected following the resignation of Thabo Mbeki and briefly served before being succeeded by Jacob Zuma, who later appointed Motlanthe deputy president.						
4		Jacob Zuma (born 1942)	2009; 2014	9 May 2009	24 May 2014	8 years, 281 days	25th	ANC	Zuma I (Reshuffle 1 · 2 · 3)	
4		Jacob Zuma (born 1942)	2009; 2014	24 May 2014	14 February 2018	8 years, 281 days	26th	ANC	Zuma II (Reshuffle 1 · 2 · 3)	
4		Jacob Zuma (born 1942)	2009; 2014	The fourth post-apartheid president of South Africa. Presided over the centennial celebration of the ANC in 2015 as well as the death and state funeral of Nelson Mandela in 2013. With over a year before his term was to expire, Zuma resigned on 14 February 2018 following the demands of the ANC that Zuma should resign, or risk facing a successful vote of no confidence by the National Assembly.						
5		Cyril Ramaphosa (born 1952)	2019; 2024	15 February 2018	22 May 2019	8 years, 269 days	26th	ANC	Ramaphosa I	
5		Cyril Ramaphosa (born 1952)	2019; 2024	22 May 2019	14 June 2024	8 years, 269 days	27th	ANC	Ramaphosa II	
5		Cyril Ramaphosa (born 1952)	2019; 2024	14 June 2024	Incumbent	8 years, 269 days	28th	ANC	Ramaphosa III; ANC—DA—IFP—PA	
5		Cyril Ramaphosa (born 1952)	2019; 2024	The fifth post-apartheid president of South Africa, elected following the resignation of Jacob Zuma.						

== See also ==
- List of heads of state of South Africa
- State President of South Africa
- Prime Minister of South Africa
- Governor-General of South Africa
- Deputy President of South Africa
- State President of the South African Republic (1857–1902)
- State President of the Orange Free State
- Freedom Day
- List of South African presidents by age
